= List of accolades received by Shiva Baby =

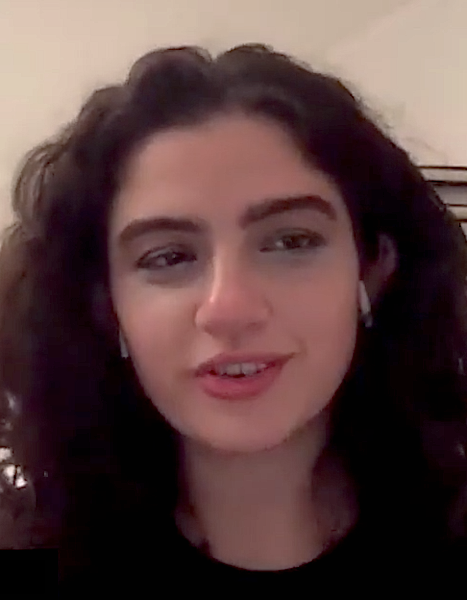
- Writer-director Emma Seligman during a video interview for the 2020 Boston Jewish Film Festival
Accolades
| Award | Wins | Nominations |
| Artios Awards | 1 | 0 |
| Austin Film Critics Association | 0 | 2 |
| Chicago Film Critics Association | 0 | 2 |
| Detroit Film Critics Society | 1 | 0 |
| Directors Guild of America Awards | 0 | 1 |
| Dorian Awards | 0 | 2 |
| Florida Film Critics Circle | 0 | 1 |
| GLAAD Media Awards | 0 | 1 |
| Gotham Awards | 0 | 2 |
| Hollywood Critics Association | 0 | 6 |
| Independent Spirit Awards | 2 | 0 |
| IndieWire Critics Poll | 1 | 0 |
| National Board of Review | 1 | 0 |
| Online Film Critics Society | 0 | 1 |
| Toronto Film Critics Association | 1 | 0 |

Totals (Note: Certain award groups do not simply award one winner. They acknowledge several different recipients, have runners-up, and have third place. Since this is a specific recognition and is different from losing an award, runner-up mentions are considered wins in this award tally. For simplification and to avoid errors, each award in this list has been presumed to have had a prior nomination.)
- Wins: 38
- Nominations: 71

Shiva Baby is a 2020 film, written and directed by Emma Seligman. It has received many awards and nominations, particularly for Seligman's writing and directing as her feature film debut, and lead actress Rachel Sennott. Seligman was nominated for a Directors Guild Award; casting director Kate Geller won a Casting Society of America award; and the film won the Independent Spirit John Cassavetes Award, in 2022. It also won a National Board of Review Award for 2021, and production designer Cheyenne Ford was selected to the 2021 BAFTA Breakthrough US cohort thanks to her work on the film. Between 2020 and 2022 it won a variety of critics', festival, and media titles; for 2021, and also 2020, it was included on many best-of lists.

As an awards contender, attention was particularly given to Seligman's adapted screenplay and Sennott's breakthrough performance in the lead role, with Seligman as a possible female director nominee also noted. In January 2022, The Guardian wrote that the ensemble cast in general, and Polly Draper and Dianna Agron as supporting actresses in particular, were among the performances that "ought to be in the mix [in the awards season], but haven't yet generated the buzz they deserve." Hungarian film website Hetedik Sor analyzed the whole season's awards performances and named Shiva Baby the "best of the rest". (Note: It was described as such for being the non-Oscar-nominated film with the most awards, excluding Razzies.)

Variety said that the film would be unlikely to impact the Academy Awards, but felt that it deserved to be considered; The Independent said it should get a Best Picture nomination but would miss out, while Fort Worth Weekly felt it was snubbed for a Best Original Score nomination for Ariel Marx, and Peter Bradshaw of The Guardian thought Sennott should have received a Best Actress nomination. Distributor Utopia initially considered releasing Shiva Baby in time for it to be eligible for the 93rd Academy Awards; they did not and the film was eligible for the 94th Academy Awards. It was one of the few potential nominees that were not made available in the Academy Screening Room.

Discussing the Independent Spirit Awards, Vulture theorized that "the stressful mental space" of the film may be a reason for it receiving fewer major nominations, and described the oversight as "kind of deeply insane". Shiva Baby was the expected winner of the John Cassavetes Award; the ceremony marked a return to fully in-person events following the COVID-19 pandemic and, when the film won, the cast and crew all accepted the award on stage. Interviewed there, Sennott said that "it means so much to [...] feel so supported by [...] the indie filmmaking community". In her acceptance speech, Seligman dedicated the award to members of the cast and crew who had died since it was made.

== Best-of lists ==
Shiva Baby placed on various best-of lists for both 2020, the year of its festival debut, and 2021, when it was released in movie theaters and on streaming. It has been included on overall lists as well as lists specifically for independent, debut, comedy, horror, Jewish, and LGBTQ+ movies.

Select 2021 year-end rankings of Shiva Baby
| Publication | List | Rank | Ref. |
|---|---|---|---|
| AnOther Magazine | The Best Independent and Arthouse Films of 2021 | 9 | |
| Austin American-Statesman | Best Movies of 2021 | 6 | |
| Autostraddle | The Best Lesbian Movies of 2021 | 8 | |
| The A.V. Club | The best films of 2021: Leila Latif | 11 | |
| BuzzFeed | The Best Movies We Watched In 2021 (Note: The BuzzFeed list is ordered alphabetically.) | – | |
| CBC | 21 best films of 2021 | 11 | |
| CBC | The 10 best queer movies of 2021 | 9 | |
| CinemaBlend | 10 Best Under-The-Radar 2021 Movies | 6 | |
| Collider | 10 Best Movies Not Nominated For an Oscar This Year | 2 | |
| La Crónica de Hoy | Javier Quintanar Polanco's Top Films of 2021 | 19 | |
| The Daily Beast | The 11 Best Movies of the Year | 11 | |
| Decider | Best Movies of 2021 | 16 | |
| Dread Central | Josh Korngut's Top 10 Horror Movies Of 2021 | 5 | |
| Empire | The Best Movies Of 2021 | 17 | |
| Esquire España | 21 films of 2021 that you should see | 12 | |
| Exclaim! | Exclaim!'s 17 Best Films of 2021 | 3 | |
| Forbes | The Best Movies Of 2021 (Note: The Forbes list is ordered alphabetically.) | – | |
| Fox TV (Note: The Fox lists are "in no particular order"; they give blurbs to eleven movies.) | The essential comedy movies of 2021 | – | |
| Fox TV | The essential horror movies of 2021 | – | |
| GAY TIMES | The 10 best LGBTQ+ films of 2021 | 1 | |
| Glamour | The 34 Best Movies of 2021 | 13 | |
| The Guardian | The 50 Best Films of 2021 in the US | 43 | |
| The Guardian | The 50 Best Films of 2021 in the UK | 44 | |
| i-D | 30 of the year's best movies and shows | 23 | |
| IndieWire | The 10 Best First Feature Films of 2021 (Note: The IndieWire list is ordered alphabetically.) | – | |
| The Irish Times | The 50 best films of 2021 | 14 | |
| The Jerusalem Post | The best movies of 2021 | 5 | |
| The Jewish Chronicle | The most Jewish films of the year | 4 | |
| Little White Lies | The 30 best films of 2021 | 29 | |
| Paste | The 20 Best Comedies of 2021 | 1 | |
| Paste | The 50 Best Movies of 2021 | 12 | |
| Polygon | The best movies of 2021 (Note: The Polygon list is ordered alphabetically.) | – | |
| Pop Culture Happy Hour | Aisha Harris's favorite moments of 2021 | 3 | |
| RogerEbert.com | Matt Fagerholm's Top Ten of 2021 (Note: Fagerholm did not rank his top ten, listing them alphabetically.) | – | |
| RogerEbert.com | Peter Sobczynski's Top Ten of 2021 | 10 | |
| RogerEbert.com | Monica Castillo's Top Ten of 2021 | 10 | |
| RogerEbert.com | Kristy Puchko's Top Ten of 2021 | 6 | |
| RogerEbert.com | Marya E. Gates's Top Ten of 2021 | 3 | |
| RogerEbert.com | Mary Beth McAndrews's Top Ten of 2021 | 9 | |
| Rolling Stone | The 20 Best Movies of 2021 | 7 | |
| RTÉ | 10 great movies you might have missed in 2021 (Note: The RTÉ list is unranked.) | – | |
| The Salt Lake Tribune | The top movies of 2021 | 18 | |
| Screen Rant | The Best Movies Of 2021 | 5 | |
| Sight & Sound | The 50 best films of 2021 | 42 | |
| The Skinny | The Skinny's Films of 2021 | 10 | |
| Slant Magazine | The 50 Best Films of 2021 | 30 | |
| Slant Magazine | Wes Greene's Top 10 Films of 2021 | 3 | |
| Talkhouse | The 2021 Talkies | 35 | |
| Talkhouse | Cheryl Dunn's Top 10 Movies of the Year | 10 | |
| Talkhouse | Michael Gallagher's Top 10 Movies of the Year | 4 | |
| Talkhouse | Chad Hartigan's Top 10 Movies of the Year | 8 | |
| Talkhouse | Jonathan Wysocki's Top 10 Movies of the Year | 10 | |
| The Arts Fuse | Best Movies of 2021: Nicole Veneto | 10 | |
| The Arts Fuse | Best Movies of 2021: Sarah Osman | 8 | |
| Total Film | The 25 best movies of 2021 | 21 | |
| Yardbarker | The 25 best films of 2021 | 23 | |

Select 2020 year-end rankings of Shiva Baby
| Publication | List | Rank | Ref. |
|---|---|---|---|
| Bay Area Reporter | Top Five LGBT Movies of 2020: Comedy | 1 | |
| Letterboxd | Best of the Fests 2020 | 6 | |
| Phoenix Film Festival | Jeff Mitchell's Top 20 of 2020 | 10 | |
| Screen Rant | The Biggest Movies Of 2020 That Audiences Won't Get To See Until Next Year | 10 | |
| them. | 5 Queer Films We Loved in 2020 (Note: The them. list is ordered alphabetically.) | – | |

- The climax of the film when "everything gets to be too much for Danielle" was listed as one of the Best Movie Moments of 2021 by Looper.
- Rachel Sennott was named on the RogerEbert.com list of 24 Great Performances of 2021, on The A.V. Club's favorite film performances of 2021 list, and The Daily Beast's 20 Funniest Performances of 2021.
- The trailer was listed by Screen Rant, The A.V. Club, and BuzzFeed as one of the best of the year.
- The poster, designed by High Council, was listed as one of the best posters of the year by IndieWire, Little White Lies, and The Film Stage.
- At the end of 2021, Shiva Baby was included on the TheJournal.ie list of "10 movie gems available to stream now", which featured films released in different years.
- In June 2021, Shiva Baby was included on Complex's list of the Best Movies of 2021 (So Far).

== Juried awards ==
Juried awards
| Association | Date of ceremony | Category | Recipients | Result | Ref(s). |
|---|---|---|---|---|---|
| Argentine Association of Directors of Photography (ADF) Presented at the Mar del Plata International Film Festival | November 29, 2020 | Best International Cinematography | Maria Rusche | Won | |
| Artios Awards | March 23, 2022 | Micro Budget – Comedy or Drama | Kate Geller | Won | |
| British Independent Film Awards | December 5, 2021 | Best International Independent Film | Shiva Baby | Longlisted | |
| Directors Guild of America Awards | March 12, 2022 | Outstanding Directing – First-Time Feature Film | Emma Seligman | Nominated | |
| Dorian Awards | March 17, 2022 | Best LGBTQ Film | Shiva Baby | Nominated | |
| Dorian Awards | March 17, 2022 | Best Unsung Film | Shiva Baby | Nominated | |
| GLAAD Media Award | April 2, 2022 | Outstanding Film – Limited Release | Shiva Baby | Nominated | |
| Gotham Independent Film Awards | November 29, 2021 | Bingham Ray Breakthrough Director Award | Emma Seligman | Nominated | |
| Gotham Independent Film Awards | November 29, 2021 | Breakthrough Actor | Rachel Sennott | Nominated | |
| Greater Western New York Film Critics Association | January 1, 2022 | Breakthrough Performance | Rachel Sennott | Won | |
| Independent Spirit Awards | March 6, 2022 | John Cassavetes Award | Shiva Baby; Emma Seligman, Kieran Altmann, Katie Schiller, Lizzie Shapiro | Won | |
| Independent Spirit Awards | March 6, 2022 | Producers Award | Lizzie Shapiro | Won | |
| National Board of Review | March 15, 2022 | Top Ten Independent Films | Shiva Baby | Listed | |

- Cheyenne Ford was selected to the 2021 British Academy of Film and Television Arts Breakthrough cohort (US) for production design on Shiva Baby.

== Critics' awards ==
Critics awards
| Association | Date of ceremony | Category | Recipients | Result | Ref(s). |
|---|---|---|---|---|---|
| Austin Film Critics Association | January 11, 2022 | Best First Film | Emma Seligman | Nominated | |
| Austin Film Critics Association | January 11, 2022 | The Robert R. "Bobby" McCurdy Memorial Breakthrough Artist Award | Rachel Sennott | Nominated | |
| Catalan Association of Film Criticism and Writing (ACCEC) Presented at the Americana Film Festival | March 8, 2021 | Best Feature Film | Shiva Baby | Won | |
| Chicago Film Critics Association | December 15, 2021 | Most Promising Performer | Rachel Sennott | Nominated | |
| Chicago Film Critics Association | December 15, 2021 | Milos Stehlik Breakthrough Filmmaker Award | Emma Seligman | Nominated | |
| Detroit Film Critics Society | December 6, 2021 | Breakthrough | Emma Seligman | Won (Note: Shared with Woody Norman for C'mon C'mon) | |
| Florida Film Critics Circle Awards | December 22, 2021 | Best First Film | Shiva Baby; Emma Seligman | Nominated | |
| Hollywood Critics Association Awards | February 28, 2022 | Best Independent Film | Shiva Baby | Nominated | |
| Hollywood Critics Association Midseason Awards | July 1, 2021 | Best Picture | Shiva Baby | Nominated | |
| Hollywood Critics Association Midseason Awards | July 1, 2021 | Best Actress | Rachel Sennott | Nominated | |
| Hollywood Critics Association Midseason Awards | July 1, 2021 | Best Filmmaker | Emma Seligman | Nominated | |
| Hollywood Critics Association Midseason Awards | July 1, 2021 | Best Screenplay | Shiva Baby | Nominated | |
| Hollywood Critics Association Midseason Awards | July 1, 2021 | Best Indie Film | Shiva Baby | Nominated | |
| IndieWire Critics Poll | December 13, 2021 | Best First Feature | Shiva Baby | Fourth | |
| Online Film Critics Society Awards | January 24, 2022 | Best Debut Feature | Shiva Baby; Emma Seligman | Nominated | |
| Toronto Film Critics Association | January 16, 2022 | Best First Feature | Shiva Baby; Emma Seligman, Photon Films | Runner-up (Note: Shared with Passing and Pig) | |

- In the critics poll of the 2020 TIFF line-up, Shiva Baby placed second for Best Screenplay (behind One Night in Miami).

== Film festival awards ==
Film festival awards
| Association | Date of ceremony | Category | Recipients | Result | Ref(s). |
|---|---|---|---|---|---|
| Adelaide Film Festival | October 30, 2020 | Audience Award for Feature Fiction | Shiva Baby | Won | |
| Calgary International Film Festival | October 4, 2020 | International Narrative | Shiva Baby | Nominated | |
| Deauville American Film Festival | September 12, 2020 | Grand Prize | Shiva Baby | Nominated | |
| Denver Film Festival | November 13, 2020 | American Independent Award | Shiva Baby | Special mention: New Comedic Voice | |
| Image+Nation | December 9, 2020 | Best Feature Film | Shiva Baby | Won | |
| IndieLisboa | September 6, 2021 | International Competition: Feature Film | Shiva Baby | Nominated | |
| Indie Memphis | October 28, 2020 | Best Narrative Feature | Shiva Baby | Won | |
| Indie Memphis | November 3, 2020 | Audience Award – Best Narrative Feature | Shiva Baby | Won | |
| Los Cabos International Film Festival | November 21, 2020 | International Competition | Shiva Baby | Nominated | |
| Mar del Plata International Film Festival | November 29, 2020 | International Competition | Shiva Baby | Nominated | |
| Miami International Film Festival | October 11, 2020 | Jordan Ressler First Feature Award | Emma Seligman | Nominated | |
| Outfest | July 26, 2020 | Best Screenwriting | Emma Seligman | Won | |
| Out on Film | October 8, 2020 | Best Narrative Feature | Shiva Baby | Runner-up | |
| Out on Film | October 8, 2020 | Best First Film | Shiva Baby; Emma Seligman | Runner-up | |
| Philadelphia Jewish Film Festival | November 21, 2020 | Rising Star | Rachel Sennott | Won | |
| South by Southwest | March 24, 2020 | Best Narrative Feature | Shiva Baby (Note: The short film from which it was adapted, also called Shiva Baby and written and directed by Seligman, was released in 2018 and nominated in the Best Narrative Short category at the 2018 South by Southwest film festival.) | Nominated | |
| Toronto International Film Festival | September 20, 2020 | Best Canadian Feature Film | Shiva Baby | Nominated | |
| Warsaw Jewish Film Festival | November 21, 2021 | Best Narrative Feature | Shiva Baby | Won | |

== Media awards ==
Media awards
| Award/Outlet | Date of ceremony | Category | Recipients | Result | Ref(s). |
|---|---|---|---|---|---|
| Apolo Awards | March 2, 2022 | Best Film | Shiva Baby; Filmin | Nominated | |
| Apolo Awards | March 2, 2022 | Best Comedy | Shiva Baby | Won | |
| Apolo Awards | March 2, 2022 | Best New Director | Emma Seligman | Nominated | |
| Apolo Awards | March 2, 2022 | Best Adapted Screenplay | Emma Seligman | Won | |
| Apolo Awards | March 2, 2022 | Best Editing | Hanna Park | Won | |
| Apolo Awards | March 2, 2022 | Best Original Music | Ariel Marx | Nominated | |
| Apolo Awards | March 2, 2022 | Best Ensemble Cast | Shiva Baby; Rachel Sennott, Dianna Agron, Polly Draper, Danny Deferrari, Fred Melamed, Molly Gordon | Won | |
| Apolo Awards | March 2, 2022 | Best New Actress | Rachel Sennott | Nominated | |
| The Braddies / The Guardian (Note: The Braddies do not have winners, and the nominees "are listed in no particular order".) | December 16, 2021 | Best Actress | Rachel Sennott | Listed | |
| The Braddies / The Guardian | December 16, 2021 | Best Debut | Shiva Baby; Emma Seligman | Listed | |
| Chlotrudis Society for Independent Films | March 22, 2022 | Best Original Screenplay | Emma Seligman | Nominated | |
| Chlotrudis Society for Independent Films | March 22, 2022 | Best Performance by an Ensemble Cast | Shiva Baby; Danny Deferrari, Dianna Agron, Fred Melamed, Jackie Hoffman, Molly Gordon, Polly Draper, Rachel Sennott | Won | |
| Filmmaker Magazine | October 28, 2020 | 25 New Faces of Indie Film | Emma Seligman | Listed | |
| Golden Brick Awards / Filmspotting | January 21, 2022 | Golden Brick Award (Best Overlooked or Underseen Film of the Year) | Shiva Baby | Nominated | |
| Golden Brick Awards / Filmspotting | January 21, 2022 | Golden Brick Award: Listeners' Choice | Shiva Baby | Won | |
| Golden Tomato Awards / Rotten Tomatoes | January 14, 2022 | Best Movie | Shiva Baby | Thirteenth | |
| Golden Tomato Awards / Rotten Tomatoes | January 14, 2022 | Best Limited Release Movie | Shiva Baby | Second | |
| Golden Tomato Awards / Rotten Tomatoes | January 14, 2022 | Best Comedy Movie | Shiva Baby | Won | |
| Hey Alma | September 13, 2021 | Best Jewish Film | Shiva Baby | Won | |
| The Jewish Week | July 12, 2021 | 36 Under 36 | Emma Seligman | Listed | |
| The New York Times | December 17, 2021 | Best Directing (Comedy) | Emma Seligman | Won | |
| The ReFrame Stamp | February 17, 2021 | Narrative Feature | Shiva Baby | Listed | |
| St. Louis Jewish Light | December 27, 2021 | Best Performance by an actress (in a Jewish movie) | Polly Draper | Won | |
| Variety Presented at the Mill Valley Film Festival | October 13, 2020 | 10 Screenwriters to Watch | Emma Seligman | Listed | |

- The film poster was nominated in the "Best Picture (Literal Picture)" category of comedy podcast Las Culturistas's culture awards.
