= Shiva Baby (soundtrack) =

Shiva Baby (Original Motion Picture Soundtrack)

Film score by Ariel Marx
- Released: April 2, 2021
- Recorded: 2020–2021
- Genre: Film score
- Length: 21:47
- Label: Lakeshore Records
- Producer: Ariel Marx

Shiva Baby (Original Motion Picture Soundtrack) is the film score composed by Ariel Marx to the 2020 comedy film Shiva Baby, directed by Emma Seligman. The score album featuring 10 tracks was released digitally on April 2, 2021 by Lakeshore Records, and on CD on April 30, 2021.

The film's source material — the original short film, also directed by Seligman — did not have an underscore, and Seligman wanted to take the same approach for its feature film. But in order to highlight the emotions expressed by the lead character, and the intensity of some sequences, she realized the necessity for a score, and approached her classmate and composer Marx to score the film. Seligman insisted on a "dissonant and abrasive score" without any "melodic moments", so Marx composed most of the film, using strings, in order to emulate the style of klezmer music.

The score was positively received by critics, who highlighted the score as "haunting" and builds a traumatic experience to the viewers; some also drew comparison with horror film scores. It has been featured in several publications as "one of the best film scores of 2021".

== Production ==
=== Background ===
Seligman was uncertain if she wanted to use a film score when going into production, as she was aiming for realism, and the source material — her 2018 short, where the film is adapted from — did not feature an original score. However, she decided to use a film score, as it may divert focus from background chatter and represent Danielle's (Rachel Sennott) emotions for few sequences. She approached his fellow New York University classmate and film composer Ariel Marx, to score for the film, through one of her colleagues.

Marx watched the original source material, before scoring the film. According to her, what struck about the short was "beyond it being so brilliant, brave, and so unique — was how well it worked without a score". She felt that "a lot of the success of the movie is letting people sit in their discomfort. A lot of that has to do with moments that may typically have a score but didn’t. I was most blown away by how strong the storytelling was without a score thus the score could just be an additional element that added so much more, but it wasn’t guiding or necessary".

=== Composition ===
Marx, a string player, sent a library of string assortments to Seligman, which she liked. The library consisted of different sounds and palettes which could be made "with a stringed instrument that aren't necessarily what you expect from a classical instrument; and they are not pleasant sounds." Seligman wanted a "more dissonant, and violent score", one mostly without melody, which would have been heavy-handed for the film. Hence the idea of klezmer music arose, and Marx used strings, without being overpowering, a "sweet spot" that Seligman had mentioned.

"I'm just using techniques that are abrasive and dissident. I did a lot of circular bowing, Bartok pizzicato, and lots of drought intense pressure on the bow and the strings so it would not elicit any warm, round, beautiful sound, but more so something under stress. The instruments are fine [laughs], but these are more dissonant techniques that are very abrasive and traditionally not pleasant to listen to but very effective in communicating stress and claustrophobia."

— Ariel Marx, on the dissonant score for the film

Marx suggested that Seligman wanted the score to "really punctuate the anxiety, but nothing else", which, according to her, was a fun task because "what we ended up with was all about torturing the instrument". She further suggested scoring some scenes that had not originally been intended, making them more stressful. In addition to composing, Marx performed strings, violin and cello, while Sam Mazur contributed percussion. Seligman referenced Trey Edward Shults' Krisha (2015) and Safdie brothers' Uncut Gems (2019), as both the films focused on the narrative more than sound, whereas Marx drew parallels between the textural quality of her score to those of the thriller films Under the Skin (2014), Hereditary (2018) and Midsommar, while its quirkiness was attributed to Jon Brion's score for Punch-Drunk Love (2002).

While shooting a scene where Danielle looks over at Kim and Max's baby for the first time, getting a good look at them and the baby is crying, Seligman felt that "the dialogue was background noise and the scene was about her really understanding what this baby meant in Max’s life", describing the need for music "which would be awesome to heighten this moment". Marx then layered an assortment of strings trembling over the baby's wails and added rough plucks (referred to Marx's statement on instrumental torture) to punctuate Danielle’s tense movements. She said that, "these are generally not sounds that you play and use for a beautifully soloistic violin passage". She experimented with circular bowing for musical cues gluing the others together, that utilises the "warm, less defined color" from bowing over the fingerboard as well as the "grating, distorted sound" from near the bridge. The sound resulted in a "hypnotic, off-kilter lull," which was "almost like the electricity flowing through Danielle’s veins".

== Track listing ==
All tracks are written by Ariel Marx.

Shiva Baby (Original Motion Picture Soundtrack)
No.	Title	Length
1.	"Danielle"	1:31
2.	"Shiva Baby"	4:53
3.	"Max"	1:02
4.	"Anxiety Attack"	3:46
5.	"Kim"	1:39
6.	"Dizzy"	1:49
7.	"Baby"	1:46
8.	"Trying To Escape"	2:19
9.	"The Truth Comes Out"	1:22
10.	"Who Died?"	1:40
Total length:		21:47

== Reception ==
=== Critical response ===
The score received positive reviews. Peter Bradshaw of The Guardian opined Marx's "nerve-jangling" score underlined the "inner anxiety of the intense, claustrophobic black comedy". Stephen Saito for Moveable Fest described the score as Marx's version of the Jaws theme. IndieWire's Jude Dry wrote that the "tense string score ratchets up the tension, though this technique loses its bite after a few too many uses", while Katie Rife of The A.V. Club praised it, likening it to the work of Harry Manfredini. Alex Godfrey of Empire wrote that Marx's "discordant, unsettling score — like [Krzysztof] Penderecki doing klezmer — ratchets up, strings picked and plucked and screeched like nails on a blackboard". The Hollywood Reporter-based Jon Frosch wrote that "Ariel Marx's anxiogenic score, with its nervous string plucking and piano plinking, both builds and punctuates the tension." Shreya Paul of Firstpost wrote that "Ariel Marx's menacing, staccato strings-centric score enhances the angst that each character experiences while also highlighting the sheer comedy behind their exposé." Praising the music and sound design, The Harvard Crimson's Megan Gamino wrote:

Ariel Marx artfully includes the chaotic noises of the shiva, making for particularly grounding and grating moments in the music. The use of intense “Jaws”-like string instruments puts viewers on edge, and clever sound mixing of a crying baby helps emphasize the film’s most harrowing moments [...] These types of sound interpolations help to bridge the gap between viewers and Danielle. The audience reacts to the shrill score at the same moment Danielle is dealing with the baby’s shrill crying after an increasingly tense day.

CineVue-based Christopher Machell wrote, "There is a symbolic cacophony to it all, made manifest by the plucked strings of Ariel Marx’s score and the brilliant, maddening sound design, layering Marx’s stabbing music and a growing diegetic clutter to breaking point." The Austin Chronicle's Richard Whittaker wrote that Marx's "scratchy string-and-timpani soundtrack" brings "a sensation of queasiness further unbalanced by the score". Andrew Parker for The GATE also touched on the score's horror-like qualities, saying it worked well for its contribution to the claustrophobic storytelling. Ty Burr of The Boston Globe noted Ariel Marx's score, "pulling plucks and squawks out of an abused violin" is "dinner music for an ulcer". Emily Moss of the student newspaper Varsity compared the score of the film to that of Get Out and Hereditary. Writing for the Jewish independent magazine The Forward, Mira Fox felt that Marx's "high-pitched and plunky soundtrack" felt akin to the shrieking violins in the score for Psycho (1960).

=== Best-of lists ===
Select 2021 year-end rankings of Shiva Baby in film scores and soundtracks list
Publication	Rank	Ref.
The Film Stage	13	
IndieWire	9	
Zanobard Reviews	5	
Flickering Myth	12	
Little White Lies	10	
Insider Inc.	6	
