= Stadium (disambiguation) =

A stadium is a large venue for hosting and viewing sports, concerts, and other events.

Stadium may also refer to:

== Art and entertainment ==
- Stadium (album), a 2018 album by Eli Keszler
- Stadium (film), a 1934 Italian film
- Stadium (rock opera), a 1985 composition by Alexander Gradsky
- "The Stadium" (Black Summer), a television episode
- Stadium (sports network), a streaming and broadcast service

== Mathematics and technology ==
- Stadium (geometry), a geometric shape
- Stadium (software), an engineering application for determining the service life of concrete

== Places ==
- The Stadium (cirque), on Elephant Island, South Shetland Islands, Antarctica
- Stadium MRT station, Singapore
- Stadium (UTA station), Salt Lake City, US
- Stadium High School, Tacoma, Washington, US
- Stadium Road or 107 Avenue, Edmonton, Canada

== See also ==
- Stadia (disambiguation)
- Stadion (disambiguation)
- Stadium Arena (disambiguation)
- Stadium station (disambiguation)
