= Ruby Cruz =

American actress (born 2000)

- Cruz in 2026
- Born: Ruby Jean Cruz; March 31, 2000 (age 26); Los Angeles, California, U.S.
- Occupation: Actress
- Years active: 2018–present
- Father: Brandon Cruz

Ruby Jean Cruz (born March 31, 2000) is an American actress. She has acted in various short films and television series including Mare of Easttown and Castle Rock, and most notably as Kit Tanthalos in Willow.

In 2023, she made her feature length movie debut as Hazel Callahan in Bottoms, directed by Emma Seligman.

== Career ==
Ruby Cruz was born to actor and musician Brandon Cruz and Liz Cruz, an entrepreneur. Cruz grew up in Los Angeles, California, and began auditioning for film and television roles in high school. She studied theater at DePaul University before dropping out to pursue her acting career.

In 2018, Cruz played the younger version of Lizzy Caplan's character, Annie Wilkes, in Castle Rock. Cruz received praise from TVLine for the way she captured Caplan's physicality. In 2020, Cruz appeared in season 10 of Blue Bloods.

In 2021, Cruz appeared as Jess Riley in the HBO drama series Mare of Easttown. Later that year, Cruz was cast as Kit Tanthalos, the first openly lesbian Disney princess, in the television series Willow. She took over the role from friend and Mare of Easttown costar Cailee Spaeny, who dropped out due to scheduling conflicts. The show, which premiered in November 2022, acts as a sequel to the 1988 film of the same title.

In 2023, she appeared alongside Rachel Sennott and Ayo Edebiri in Bottoms as Hazel Callahan, a co-founder of a high school fight club for girls. In 2024, she joined the cast for the third season of The Sex Lives of College Girls as Ash. In 2025, she starred in The Threesome, a romantic comedy film. In 2026, she joined the cast of the Elden Ring film, a live-action adaptation of the game of the same name. It is set for a March 2028 release.

== Personal life ==
Cruz is queer and of Mexican heritage. Her father is American former actor and punk musician Brandon Cruz. Her mother, Elizabeth "Liz" Cruz (née Finkelstein), is an entrepreneur, whom her father married in 1994 and later divorced. She has one older brother, Lincoln, born 1995.

== Filmography ==
=== Films ===
Year	Title	Role	Notes
2018	Aging Out	June	Short film
2018	The Jump	Luna	Short film
2018	Murder On The Green	Lucy	Short film
2019	Spin	The School Girl	Short film
2020	God Is a Lobster	Bea	Short film
2023	Bottoms	Hazel Callahan	
2024	What Would Jesus Do?	Thandi	Short film
2025	By Design	Shelia the Intern	
2025	Steak Dinner	Taylor	Short film
2025	The Threesome	Jenny	
2026	Magazine	Greer	
2028	Elden Ring	TBA	Post-production

=== Television ===
Year	Title	Role	Notes
2019	Castle Rock	Teen Annie Wilkes	2 episodes
2020	Blue Bloods	Amanda Webster	Episode: "Where the Truth Lies"
2021	Mare of Easttown	Jess Riley	6 episodes
2022	Willow	Princess Kit Tanthalos/Young Bavmorda (voice only)	8 episodes
2024–2025	The Sex Lives of College Girls	Ash	5 episodes
2026	For All Mankind	Lily Dale	Main role (season 5)

=== Music videos ===
Year	Title	Artist
2023	"Salad"	Blondshell
