= Ariel Marx =

American composer

Ariel Marx is an American multi-instrumentalist and composer of music for film and television. She is known for her scores of the 2020 film Shiva Baby, and National Geographic's miniseries A Small Light, which earned her an Emmy nomination in 2023.

== Early life and education ==
Ariel Marx had an interest in playing and writing music from a young age, but studied ethnomusicology and plant biology during her time as an undergraduate at Hampshire College. After graduating, she pursued a growing interest in music composition, spending several years enrolled in private lessons to prepare for graduate school applications in film scoring.

Marx was accepted into the NYU Music Theory and Composition program, from which she graduated in 2015. She eventually narrowed her focus to music composition for film and television after repeatedly collaborating with filmmakers from various schools throughout the city.

== Career ==
While enrolled at NYU, Marx was accepted to the Columbia/ASCAP Film Scoring Workshop, where she wrote the music for the short film Dear Mother, and received the Mancini Music Fellowship award for "Most Promising Composer." Dear Mother co-director Reka Posta introduced Marx to writer and director Jennifer Fox, who she worked with to compose the music for Fox's film, The Tale, starring Laura Dern. The Tale was screened at the 2018 Tribeca Festival alongside So You Like the Neighborhood and To Dust, both of which were also scored by Marx.

Marx's career reached a turning point in 2020 when she was selected to score Emma Seligman's debut feature film, Shiva Baby. The critically acclaimed indie film, starring Rachel Sennott, was widely praised for Marx's sparse, but textured and dissident score. Following this, Marx scored her first major television project, Ted Bundy: Falling for a Killer, a five-part true crime docuseries. Her work attracted the attention of writers Robin Veith, Nick Antosca, and Michael Uppendahl, who Marx then collaborated with to compose the score for Candy, which aired on Hulu.

Beginning in late 2022, Marx spent five months composing the score for National Geographic's A Small Light, after being selected for the project by director Susanna Fogel. To help tell the story of Miep Gies, the Dutch woman who hid Anne Frank, Marx assembled a team of four musicians to pair with her own instrumentations, which included percussion, violin, cello, guitar, and synth. Although the score was recorded remotely, Marx seamlessly weaved together a playful and experimental soundscape.

She wrote the score for the 2025 Australian family drama film, Kangaroo Island.

== Recognition and awards ==
Marx received the Mancini Music Fellowship award for "Most Promising Composer" for her score of the short film Dear Mother while attending the Columbia/ASCAP Film Scoring Workshop.

Her score for Candy, described as both bewitching and sweet, was named third best score of the year on IndieWire's Best TV Scores of 2022 list.

In 2023, for her work on A Small Light, Marx received an Emmy nomination in the category of "Outstanding Music Composition For A Limited Or Anthology Series, Movie Or Special", and again in 2025 for her scores for the Hulu miniseries Dying for Sex and the Netflix anthology series Black Mirror.

She was nominated for Best Score at the 2026 Film Critics Circle of Australia Awards for Kangaroo Island.

== Select television credits ==
- 2020: Ted Bundy: Falling for a Killer (5 episodes)
- 2021: What Happens in Hollywood (10 episodes)
- 2021: The Principles of Pleasure (3 episodes)
- 2022: Candy (5 episodes)
- 2021–2022: American Horror Stories (2 episodes)
- 2022: Children of the Underground (5 episodes)
- 2022: A Friend of the Family (9 episodes)
- 2023: A Small Light (8 episodes)
- 2023: Last Call: When a Serial Killer Stalked Queer New York (4 episodes)
- 2025: Dying for Sex (8 episodes)
- 2023–2025: Black Mirror (2 episodes)
- 2025: Happy Face (7 episodes)
- 2025: The Last Frontier (10 episodes)

== Selected film credits ==
- 2018: The Tale
- 2018: To Dust
- 2020: Shiva Baby
- 2022: Sanctuary
- 2022: June Zero
- 2023: Birth/Rebirth
- 2024: Lilly
- 2025: Kangaroo Island

== See also ==
- Shiva Baby (soundtrack)
