= Bottoms (film) =

2023 film by Emma Seligman

- Theatrical release poster
- Directed by: Emma Seligman
- Written by: Emma Seligman; Rachel Sennott
- Produced by: Elizabeth Banks; Max Handelman; Alison Small
- Starring: Rachel Sennott; Ayo Edebiri; Ruby Cruz; Havana Rose Liu; Kaia Gerber; Nicholas Galitzine; Miles Fowler; Dagmara Domińczyk; Marshawn Lynch
- Cinematography: Maria Rusche
- Edited by: Hanna Park
- Music by: Charli XCX; Leo Birenberg
- Production companies: Orion Pictures; Brownstone Productions
- Distributed by: Orion Pictures
- Release dates: March 11, 2023 (SXSW); August 25, 2023 (United States)
- Running time: 91 minutes
- Country: United States
- Language: English
- Budget: $11.3 million
- Box office: $12.9 million

Bottoms is a 2023 American satirical black comedy film directed by Emma Seligman, who co-wrote it with Rachel Sennott. The film stars Sennott, Ayo Edebiri, Ruby Cruz in her feature film debut, Havana Rose Liu, Kaia Gerber in her film debut, Nicholas Galitzine, Miles Fowler, Dagmara Domińczyk, and Marshawn Lynch. The plot follows two high school senior girls who start a fight club as a way to hook up with cheerleaders.

Bottoms premiered at South by Southwest on March 11, 2023, and was released in the United States on August 25, by Orion Pictures. The film received positive reviews from critics.

== Plot ==
Best friends PJ and Josie are unpopular lesbian virgins at football-obsessed Rockbridge Falls High School. At the back-to-school fair, they unsuccessfully flirt with their respective crushes, popular cheerleaders Brittany and Isabel. When they see Isabel arguing with her boyfriend Jeff, the school's star quarterback, PJ and Josie invite her into their car to escape. They gently bump into Jeff when he refuses to move, prompting him to feign injury in front of the entire football team.

At school, rumors spread that PJ and Josie spent the summer at juvenile detention. Threatened with expulsion for Jeff's "injury", Josie lies that they were practicing for a feminist "self-defense club" to avoid punishment. With the help of their friend Hazel, PJ and Josie actually start the club, with the ulterior motive of attracting girls. Despite his initial lack of interest, they persuade their history teacher Mr. G to serve as the club's required advisor by convincing him that the group promotes female solidarity.

PJ and Josie embrace their reputation as violent delinquents as the club attracts more members, including Brittany and Isabel, with "lessons" in self-defense that consist of the students beating each other up. The club bonds through their chaotic, bloody sessions, and PJ and Josie grow closer to Brittany and Isabel. Meanwhile, Jeff's overprotective best friend and teammate Tim confirms his suspicions that PJ and Josie never went to detention.

Hazel discovers that her recently divorced mother is sleeping with Jeff, and Josie informs Isabel, who breaks up with Jeff in front of the entire cafeteria. While the club vandalizes Jeff's house, Josie and Isabel almost kiss before a vengeful Hazel blows up Jeff's car with a homemade bomb. Tim warns Josie to end the club, but the members decide to disband before they can be punished for the explosion, and a frustrated PJ lashes out at Hazel. Josie and Isabel have sex, while PJ kisses Brittany, but is disappointed to learn she is straight.

At a pep rally for the school's upcoming football game against longtime rival Huntington High, Tim tricks Hazel into representing the club by fighting the school's top boxer. Despite showing off some of her newly acquired skills, Hazel is badly beaten, as Tim exposes PJ and Josie's lies and their original selfish reasons for founding the club. Isabel turns against Josie, who falls out with PJ, and they are told off by Mr. G, who renounces feminism. The feuding friends are further ostracized at school, while Jeff wins back Isabel.

Josie seeks advice from her and PJ's childhood babysitter Rhodes, who reveals that Huntington tradition involves killing a Rockbridge football player. Josie and PJ reconcile with each other and with Hazel, reuniting the club in an effort to stop Huntington's plans. At the game, they discover pineapple juice has been added to the football field's sprinkler system to kill Jeff, who is deathly allergic to pineapple.

Hazel attempts to distract the crowd with another bomb, which fails to detonate, leading her and PJ to divert attention by making out. Isabel and Brittany rejoin the club in a brutal brawl with the Huntington team, as Josie carries Jeff to safety before the sprinklers go off. With most of the Huntington players dead, Tim realizes the plot to kill Jeff and leads the crowd in celebrating the club for saving him. Josie and Isabel embrace with a kiss, while Hazel's bomb finally explodes.

== Cast ==
- Rachel Sennott as PJ
- Ayo Edebiri as Josie
- Ruby Cruz as Hazel Callahan
- Havana Rose Liu as Isabel
- Kaia Gerber as Brittany
- Nicholas Galitzine as Jeff
- Miles Fowler as Tim
- Marshawn Lynch as Mr. G
- Dagmara Domińczyk as Mrs. Callahan
- Punkie Johnson as Rhodes
- Zamani Wilder as Annie
- Summer Joy Campbell as Sylvie
- Virginia Tucker as Stella-Rebecca
- Wayne Péré as Principal Meyers

== Production ==
=== Development and filming ===
In April 2021, it was announced that Seligman and Sennott were working with Orion Pictures and Brownstone Productions, with Elizabeth Banks, Max Handelman, and Alison Small producing for Brownstone, and Alana Mayo producing for Orion. It is the third collaboration between Seligman and Sennott after the 2018 short film Shiva Baby and its 2020 feature-length adaptation. Whilst promoting that film, Seligman described her next project as a "campy queer high school comedy in the vein of Wet Hot American Summer but more for a Gen-Z queer audience".

Seligman faced significant difficulties during the processes of pitching, shooting and editing Bottoms, the bulk of which were due to the potentially alienating nature of the film's overtly sexual, lesbian premise. She and Sennott received a number of rejections while introducing the concept to various studios, and often were not even permitted to properly pitch their idea to executives. Additionally, several companies declined to feature their products in the film due to its supposedly "offensive" content. Once their project was accepted by Orion, they were nearly unable to find high school campuses in New Orleans that were willing to lend their space; Seligman had to resort to shooting mostly in an abandoned elementary school and a college gymnasium. The initial drafts of the script included scenes of PJ and Josie being sent to a "militaristic boot camp" for "horny girls", where Punkie Johnson's character would've been introduced as head of the camp; however, these scenes were removed due to poor reception at test screenings.

Eunice Jera Lee served as costume designer on the film. She took inspiration from Grease (1978), Ferris Bueller's Day Off (1986), Heathers (1988), Jawbreaker (1999), and Bring It On (2000).

On September 12, 2022, it was confirmed by The New York Times that filming had wrapped. Sennott described the film as, "Two girls in a classic American football town who start a fight club under the guise of female empowerment, but it's actually so they can have sex with cheerleaders."

=== Casting ===
In April 2022, it was announced that Ayo Edebiri, Marshawn Lynch, Ruby Cruz, Havana Rose Liu, Kaia Gerber, Nicholas Galitzine, Miles Fowler, Dagmara Domińczyk and Punkie Johnson were added to the cast. Filming was scheduled to take place in New Orleans between April 18 and May 27, 2022. Seligman has said that she cast Marshawn Lynch at the suggestion of Ayo, who pointed her to his appearance on the Netflix series Murderville, the majority of which he had improvised. Seligman also thought that having a "legendary football player" portraying an advisor to queer girls in the film is good representation for "that kind of straight, male character". She and Ayo were "not entirely expecting" Lynch to accept the role when he was sent the script, with Lynch later saying that he did it as "an opportunity to correct [his] wrongs", explaining that his sister had come out as a lesbian to him when he was sixteen and that he had not initially handled this well; he also spoke with his sister about the role before taking it.

=== Music ===
The original film score for Bottoms was composed by Charli XCX and Leo Birenberg. In addition, the film features songs such as "Complicated" by Avril Lavigne, "Pain" by King Princess, "Total Eclipse of the Heart" by Bonnie Tyler, and "Party 4 U" by Charli XCX.

== Release ==
Bottoms premiered at South by Southwest on March 11, 2023. The film was given a limited theatrical release in the United States by Metro-Goldwyn-Mayer on August 25, 2023, before expanding to additional screens on September 1, 2023. It was also released theatrically in Canada on the same day. The film was released in the US and Canada on Amazon Prime Video on September 22.

Warner Bros. Pictures released the film in 405 theaters in the United Kingdom and Ireland on November 3, 2023, and in Australia and New Zealand on November 30.

On March 31, 2024, Kino Lorber announced that they would be releasing the film on Blu-ray. It was then released on May 27, 2025.

== Reception ==
=== Box office ===
Bottoms opened in limited release at ten theaters in New York City, Los Angeles, San Francisco, and Austin, grossing $461,052 in its opening weekend, a per-venue average of $46,105. It was the highest per-screen average on ten or more screens since Everything Everywhere All at Once (April 2022). The film expanded to 715 theaters in its second weekend, making $3 million, and a total of $3.58 million over the four-day Labor Day frame. Expanding to 1,265 theaters in its third weekend, the film made $2 million, finishing in 10th.

=== Critical response ===
Upon release, Bottoms received largely positive reviews from film critics. On the review aggregator website Rotten Tomatoes, 91% of 225 critics' reviews are positive, with an average rating of 7.5/10. The website's consensus reads: "Propulsive and over-the-top, Bottoms is an instant high school comedy classic that feels both current and nostalgic." Metacritic, which uses a weighted average, assigned the film a score of 74 out of 100, based on 46 critics, indicating "generally favorable" reviews. Audiences polled by PostTrak gave the film a 93% positive score, with women under 25 giving it 98% score and 96% saying they would definitely recommend it.

Reviewing the film for Variety, following its premiere at South by Southwest, Owen Gleiberman commended the direction and screenplay (particularly its characters and humor), stating: "Bottoms is unlike any high-school comedy you've ever seen. It's a satire of victimization, a satire of violence, and a satire of itself. It walks a tightrope between sensitivity and insanity (with a knowing bit of inanity), and it's full of moments that are defiantly what we once used to call incorrect." Valerie Complex of Deadline Hollywood admired the lead performances and Seligman's direction, but found some faults with the screenplay, ultimately concluding: "Bottoms is fun, but with some slight tweaks this could have been an epic exploration of the gray areas of queerness and what it means to stand in the center of that as an adolescent." Referring to the film as the "horniest, bloodiest high school movie of the 21st century" in a highly enthusiastic review for Rolling Stone, David Fear lauded every aspect of the film, including its direction, screenplay and cast performances.

Filmmakers Karyn Kusama, David Lowery, Raine Allen-Miller, Laurel Parmet and Juel Taylor all cited Bottoms as among their favorite films of 2023.

=== Accolades ===
Awards and nominations for Bottoms
Award	Date of ceremony	Category	Recipient(s)	Result	Ref.
South by Southwest	March 19, 2023	Audience Award – Headliners	Bottoms	Nominated	
Sidewalk Film Festival	August 27, 2023	Programmers' Award – Feature Film Award	Bottoms	Won	
St. Louis Film Critics Association	December 17, 2023	Best Comedy Film	Bottoms	Nominated	
Indiana Film Journalists Association	December 17, 2023	Best Original Screenplay	Emma Seligman, Rachel Sennott	Nominated	
Indiana Film Journalists Association	December 17, 2023	Best Stunt/Movement Choreography	Deven MacNair	Nominated	
Indiana Film Journalists Association	December 17, 2023	Breakout of the Year	Marshawn Lynch	Nominated	
Astra Film and Creative Awards	January 6, 2024	Best Comedy Feature	Bottoms	Nominated	
Austin Film Critics Association	January 10, 2024	The Robert R. "Bobby" McCurdy Memorial Breakthrough Artist Award	Ayo Edebiri (also for Theater Camp and TMNT: Mutant Mayhem)	Nominated	
Denver Film Critics Society	January 12, 2024	Best Comedy	Bottoms	Nominated	
Critics' Choice Movie Awards	January 14, 2024	Best Comedy	Bottoms	Nominated	
Black Reel Awards	January 16, 2024	Outstanding Hairstyle and Make-Up	Shandrea Williams	Nominated	
Independent Spirit Awards	February 25, 2024	Best Screenplay	Emma Seligman, Rachel Sennott	Nominated	
Independent Spirit Awards	February 25, 2024	Best Breakthrough Performance	Marshawn Lynch	Nominated	
Artios Awards	March 7, 2024	Outstanding Achievement in Casting – Feature Studio or Independent (Comedy)	Laura Rosenthal, Maribeth Fox, Meagan Lewis, Kimberly Ostroy	Nominated	
GLAAD Media Awards	March 14, 2024	Outstanding Film – Wide Release	Bottoms	Won	
