= Stadion =

Stadion (Greek στάδιον, Latin stadium, nominative plural stadia in both Greek and Latin) may refer to:

== People ==
- Christoph von Stadion (1478–1543), Prince-Bishop of Augsburg
- Johann Philipp Stadion, Count von Warthausen (1763–1824), Austrian statesman
- Franz Stadion, Count von Warthausen (1806–1853), Austrian statesman, son of the previous
- Franz Konrad von Stadion und Thannhausen (1679–1757), Prince-Bishop of Bamberg
- Philipp von Stadion und Thannhausen (1799–1868), Austrian field marshal

== Stadiums ==
- Stadion Lohmühle, a multi-use stadium in Lübeck, Germany
- Stockholm Olympic Stadium, commonly referred to as "Stadion," a stadium in Stockholm, Sweden
- Eleda Stadion, the home ground of Malmö FF since 2010, is commonly referred to as "Stadion".

== Train stations ==
- Stadion metro station, a metro station in Stockholm, Sweden
- Stadion (Vienna U-Bahn), a metro station in Vienna, Austria

== Other ==
- Stadion (journal), a multilingual academic journal covering the history of sport
- Stadion (running race), an ancient Greek running event, part of the Olympic Games and other Panhellenic Games, and the name of the building in which it took place
- Stadion (state), a county of the Holy Roman Empire
- Stadion (unit), Latinized as stadium, an ancient unit of length, formerly anglicized as stade
- IF Stadion, Danish sports club

== See also ==
- Stadia (disambiguation)
- Stadium (disambiguation)
- Stade (disambiguation)
