= Megadoc =

- Film poster
- Directed by: Mike Figgis
- Produced by: James T. Mockoski; Tara Li-An Smith
- Starring: Francis Ford Coppola; Eleanor Coppola; Talia Shire
- Cinematography: Mike Figgis
- Edited by: Joe Beshenkovsky
- Music by: Mike Figgis
- Distributed by: Utopia
- Release date: August 28, 2025 (Venice)
- Running time: 107 minutes
- Country: United States
- Language: English

Megadoc is a 2025 American documentary film which follows the production of the film Megalopolis by Francis Ford Coppola. It was directed by Mike Figgis. It premiered at the 82nd Venice International Film Festival in August 2025.

== Production ==
=== Background ===
Filmmaker Mike Figgis met Francis Ford Coppola while making Leaving Las Vegas, through the film's star and Coppola's nephew, Nicolas Cage. Coppola later asked Figgis to be involved with an edition of his magazine All-Story and Figgis stayed in touch with the magazine's editor Michael Ray; when Coppola eventually began production on Megalopolis, Ray mentioned this to Figgis. Having not heard of Megalopolis at the time, Figgis looked it up and, due to its lengthy production history, sent Coppola a message of congratulations. He "added a cheeky PS" saying he was open to documenting the production if Coppola was interested.

In preparing to make the film, Figgis read Sam Wasson's The Path to Paradise: A Francis Ford Coppola Story and Notes on a Life by Eleanor Coppola, whom he also asked for advice due to her involvement in making Hearts of Darkness: A Filmmaker's Apocalypse, the behind-the-scenes documentary of Francis Ford Coppola's Apocalypse Now.

=== Filming ===
Coppola replied to Figgis three weeks before pre-production began on Megalopolis in Atlanta, offering Figgis complete access to the set, albeit in an informal and casual style. The documentary began filming there in November 2022. Besides himself, Figgis had one person, Tara Li-An Smith, acting as both his assistant and producer with him on set. Initially they used a relatively large camera but, and despite Coppola giving them free rein, soon realized that to minimize their impact on proceedings and be agile enough to capture the active environment, they needed a smaller set-up and changed to a Nikon Z8. The cast and crew of Megalopolis were also initially wary of him, besides Aubrey Plaza: in character as newscaster Wow Platinum, Plaza noticed Figgis filming their rehearsals on his first day and "just grabbed [him] and ordered [him] to follow her around" to be like Wow Platinum's cameraman. Figgis was grateful for this, as it made him more comfortable filming the rehearsals before the production got to know him.

He was ultimately given time by other actors like Jon Voight and Shia LaBeouf, though lead actor Adam Driver had requested to not be filmed, which Figgis said he completely understood: "You play differently when you're performing your part for the camera and when you're performing while a documentary camera also shoots you." Driver was interviewed for the documentary, as were others who appear less in candid footage, like Nathalie Emmanuel. Though conflicts and delays frustrated the production of Megalopolis, they provided ample material for Megadoc. Figgis filmed many of LaBeouf's arguments with Coppola and also interviewed Coppola during periods when the director had changed his mind and was waiting for the crew to reorganize for his new plans.

Figgis continued filming from rehearsals, throughout the shoot, and during post-production of Megalopolis.

=== Post-production ===
Editing on Megadoc had been completed by May 2024, down to a runtime of around two hours; Figgis said there was a possible alternative cut in the style of a six-part miniseries, and even more material. The documentary includes footage of a 2001 table read of Megalopolis with its then-prospective cast of Uma Thurman and Robert De Niro, and 2003 rehearsals with Ryan Gosling, from the extensive archive material Coppola offered for the documentary.

== Release ==
In May 2024, Figgis said that he aspired for the documentary to premiere at a festival later that year before having a theatrical release. It was reported around the time, however, that release of Megadoc would be contingent on that of Megalopolis, which did not have a distributor.

Li-An Smith handled sales. Utopia – which was founded by Coppola's nephew Robert Schwartzman – acquired North American distribution rights to Megadoc early on, with StudioCanal – which represents Coppola's filmography – taking global rights on August 28, 2025, before it premiered at the 82nd Venice International Film Festival on the same day. The film received a limited theatrical run in US cinemas from September 19, 2025, with Utopia in partnership with Lionsgate re-releasing Megalopolis in conjunction. Figgis is set to attend premiere screenings in New York and Los Angeles, and will also host screenings of his other films in promotion, including a 4K restoration of Leaving Las Vegas. A trailer was released on September 2, 2025, prominently featuring quotable lines from Coppola and Plaza.

== Reception ==
On the review aggregator website Rotten Tomatoes, 98% of 60 critics' reviews are positive, with an average rating of 7.6/10. The website's consensus reads: "While the jury is still out on Megalopolis' legacy, Mike Figgis' behind-the-scenes Megadoc arrives fully formed as a priceless look into the artistic process." Metacritic, which uses a weighted average, assigned the film a score of 73 out of 100, based on 20 critics, indicating "generally favorable" reviews.

Reviews tended to praise the documentary in comparison to its subject. Peter Bradshaw considered Megadoc avoiding allegations of Coppola's inappropriate behavior towards female extras to be a flaw, but found it an engaging and successful documentary, praising Figgis' ability to show the working relationships between Coppola and a mixed variety of actors.
