= Stade (disambiguation) =

Stade is a city in Germany.

Stade may also refer to:

== Places ==
- Stade (district), a district in Germany
- Stade (region), a region in Germany
- Stad (peninsula), a peninsula in Norway
- The Stade, a beach in Hastings Old Town, Hastings, East Sussex, England

== People ==
- Albert of Stade, 13th-century chronicler
- Bernhard Stade (1848—1906), German Protestant theologian and historian
- Frederica von Stade (born 1945) American mezzo-soprano
- George Stade (1933 - 2019) American literary scholar, critic and novelist

== Other uses ==
- Stade or stadion, unit of length

== See also ==
- Stadion (running race) or stade, an ancient footrace
- Stadium
- Stadium (disambiguation)
