= Susie Searches =

- Directed by: Sophie Kargman
- Written by: Sophie Kargman
- Story by: Sophie Kargman; William Day Frank
- Produced by: Adam Mirels; Robbie Mirels
- Starring: Kiersey Clemons; Alex Wolff; Jim Gaffigan
- Cinematography: Conor Murphy
- Edited by: Christine Park
- Music by: Jon Natchez
- Distributed by: Vertical
- Release dates: September 9, 2022 (Toronto); July 28, 2023
- Running time: 105 minutes
- Countries: United States; United Kingdom
- Language: English

Susie Searches is a 2022 British American mystery thriller comedy drama film written by William Day Frank and Sophie Kargman, directed by Kargman and starring Kiersey Clemons, Alex Wolff and Jim Gaffigan. It is Kargman's feature directorial debut and based on her 2020 short film of the same name.

== Plot ==
Since childhood, Susie has a unique talent — she instantly solves any mystery. Detective books are boring for her, because she knows in advance who the criminal is. Growing up, the girl launches her own podcast in which she talks about unsolved crimes. She doesn't have many listeners, but suddenly Susie still finds a way to prove herself: in their quiet town, the most popular college student disappears without a trace.

== Cast ==
- Kiersey Clemons as Susie
- Alex Wolff as Jesse
- Jim Gaffigan as Sheriff Loggins
- Rachel Sennott as Jillian
- Ken Marino as Edgar Cabot
- Alex Moffat as Hayden Powers
- David Walton as Deputy Graham
- Isaac Cole Powell as Ray Garcia
- Geoffrey Owens as President Andrews
- Jared Gilman as Jed

== Release ==
The film premiered at the Toronto International Film Festival on September 9, 2022. In February 2023, it was announced that Vertical acquired North American distribution rights to the film. The film was then released in theaters on July 28, 2023.

== Reception ==
The film has a 51% rating on Rotten Tomatoes based on 37 reviews. Monica Castillo of RogerEbert.com awarded the film one star out of four. Robert Daniels of IndieWire graded the film a C−. Mae Abdulbaki of Screen Rant awarded the film three and a half stars out of five.

J. Kim Murphy of Variety gave the film a negative review and wrote, "The lasting impression is a missed opportunity."
