= The Threesome =

2025 American romantic comedy drama film

- Theatrical release poster
- Directed by: Chad Hartigan
- Written by: Ethan Ogilby
- Produced by: Tim White; Trevor White; Vince Jolivette; Steven Shapiro
- Starring: Zoey Deutch; Jonah Hauer-King; Ruby Cruz; Jaboukie Young-White; Josh Segarra; Robert Longstreet; Arden Myrin; Kristin Slaysman; Allan McLeod; Julia Sweeney
- Cinematography: Sing Howe Yam
- Edited by: Autumn Dea
- Music by: Keegan DeWitt
- Production companies: Star Thrower Entertainment; Filmopoly; Jupiter Peak
- Distributed by: Vertical
- Release dates: March 7, 2025 (SXSW); September 5, 2025 (United States)
- Running time: 112 minutes
- Country: United States
- Language: English
- Box office: $1.1 million

The Threesome is a 2025 American romantic comedy drama film starring Zoey Deutch, Jonah Hauer-King, and Ruby Cruz. It is directed by Chad Hartigan and written by Ethan Ogilby. The film had its world premiere at the South by Southwest Film & TV Festival on March 7, 2025, and was released in the United States on September 5, 2025, by Vertical.

== Plot ==
Thirty-year-old sound engineer Connor has feelings for his sardonic friend Olivia, who is averse to feelings and commitment and is in a casual sexual relationship with a married man, Kevin. Their mutual friend, Greg, encourages Connor to approach a young woman who had been stood up for a date, who turns out to be Jenny, a graduate student still living with her parents. After Olivia jealously inserts herself into their flirtation, the three go drinking and dancing together, culminating in a threesome.

In the morning, Olivia panics over her emotional interest in Connor and leaves. Despite his feelings for Olivia, Connor has sex with Jenny. He then finds Olivia and convinces her to give their relationship a chance. Their first date goes well, and they share a blissful six weeks as a loving couple. Olivia soon discovers she is pregnant, and deduces that it must be Connor's, as Kevin has had a vasectomy. Despite her initial uncertainty, Connor's elation at the news leads the couple to assert their mutual love and begin happily planning their future together.

Jenny arrives and reveals that she is also pregnant by Connor, and intends to keep the baby. Olivia is devastated to learn that Jenny's pregnancy is the result of Connor's solo tryst with Jenny a mere hour before he asked Olivia out. Deciding that she cannot have a future with Connor as long as Jenny is involved, Olivia ends their relationship and resolves to get an abortion.

Despite mourning the future he envisioned with Olivia, Connor insists on supporting her by driving her to her out-of-state appointment. His compassionate behavior throughout the trip reignites Olivia's feelings for him, and she backs out of the procedure. On the drive back, Connor sees a text message from Kevin, with whom she had a one-night stand in the wake of her and Connor's breakup. Hurt that Olivia slept with someone else instead of trying to work things out with him, Connor breaks up with her.

Connor begins supporting Jenny more, causing conflict when he obliviously does insensitive things like taking her to Olivia's doctor instead of finding a new one. When Connor learns that Jenny has been dishonestly telling her parents that Connor is her boyfriend, he goes along with the charade. Though tempted by the prospect of a simple, uncomplicated life with a devoted, conventional wife like Jenny, Connor cannot get past his infatuation with Olivia.

During an argument, Olivia points out that the situation gives Connor bragging rights for getting two women pregnant, while making her look stupid and gullible for having his child. Despite her previous standards, Olivia confesses that she still loves Connor and has been fantasizing about getting back together. Connor is thrilled at the prospect.

Kevin visits Olivia. Shocked at her pregnancy, he confesses that he lied about having gotten a vasectomy, enraging Olivia. She orders a prenatal paternity test, but goes into labor before receiving the results.

Jenny goes into labor shortly thereafter and arrives at the same hospital with her parents, who are confused to see Connor already there with Olivia. Misunderstanding the situation and believing Connor has been unfaithful, Jenny's father violently confronts him until Jenny finally confesses the truth. Olivia then tearfully informs Connor that her baby is Kevin's. A devastated Connor leaves to attend the birth of his and Jenny's child.

Several weeks later, Connor and Jenny have been successfully co-parenting their daughter Fiona, and Jenny is moving into her own house. Olivia shows up on moving day with her own daughter, whom she named Alice, which was Connor's suggestion for a name. Olivia professes her love for Connor, and they kiss.

In a post-credits scene, Greg tells the story of how Connor, Olivia, and Jenny met during his toast at Connor and Olivia's wedding.

== Cast ==
- Zoey Deutch as Olivia Capitano
- Jonah Hauer-King as Connor Blake
- Ruby Cruz as Jenny Brooks
- Jaboukie Young-White as Greg Demopolis
- Josh Segarra as Kevin
- Robert Longstreet as Paul Brooks
- Arden Myrin as Evelyn Brooks
- Kristin Slaysman as Maya
- Allan McLeod as Roger
- Julia Sweeney as Suzanne

== Production ==
Directed by Chad Hartigan and written by Ethan Ogilby in his feature film writing debut having previously worked on long running television series The Simpsons. In 2022 the project had Logan Lerman and Phoebe Dynevor attached to lead roles. The film is produced by Tim White and Trevor White for Star Thrower Entertainment, Vince Jolivette for Filmopoly, and Steven Shapiro for Jupiter Peak.

Principal photography took place in Arkansas in early 2024 with the working title Three's a Crowd. Filming was completed in February 2024 with Zoey Deutch, Jonah Hauer-King and Ruby Cruz in the lead roles. On 21 February 2024, Arden Myrin was confirmed in the cast.

== Release ==
The Threesome premiered at the South by Southwest Film & TV Festival on March 7, 2025. In May 2025, Vertical acquired North American distribution rights to the film, and set it for a September 5, 2025, release.

== Reception ==
On the review aggregator website Rotten Tomatoes, 79% of 56 critics' reviews are positive, with an average rating of 6.7/10. The website's consensus reads: "A bittersweet rom-com that occasionally waffles as much as its characters in how mature it wants to be, The Threesome balances out into a sweetly shaggy film with standout performances from Zoey Deutch and Ruby Cruz." Metacritic, which uses a weighted average, assigned the film a score of 70 out of 100, based on 10 critics, indicating "generally favorable" reviews.
