= Bunnylovr =

American drama film

- Theatrical release poster
- Directed by: Katarina Zhu
- Screenplay by: Katarina Zhu
- Produced by: Tristan Scott-Behrends; Ani Schroeter; Rhianon Jones; Roger Mancusi; Rachel Sennott
- Starring: Katarina Zhu; Rachel Sennott; Austin Amelio; Perry Yung; Jack Kilmer
- Cinematography: Daisy Zhou
- Edited by: Stephania Dulowski
- Music by: Eli Keszler
- Production companies: Neon Heart Productions; Fair Oaks Entertainment; Radish; RNA Films; Phiphen Studios
- Distributed by: Utopia
- Release dates: January 25, 2025 (Sundance); April 10, 2026 (United States)
- Running time: 86 minutes
- Country: United States
- Language: English

Bunnylovr is a 2025 American drama film written, directed by, and starring Katarina Zhu. The film follows a Chinese-American cam girl who navigates a toxic client relationship while reconnecting with her dying father.

The film premiered at the Sundance Film Festival on January 25, 2025 and was theatrically released in the United States on April 10, 2026.

== Premise ==
A drifting Chinese American cam girl struggles to navigate an increasingly toxic relationship with one of her clients while rekindling her relationship with her dying estranged father.

== Cast ==
- Katarina Zhu as Rebecca
- Austin Amelio as John, Rebecca's client
- Perry Yung as William, Rebecca's terminally ill father
- Rachel Sennott as Bella, an artist and Rebecca's friend
- Jack Kilmer as Carter, Rebecca's ex-boyfriend
- Clara Wong as Dr. Karas

== Production ==
In October 2024, it was announced that filming had wrapped in New York City.

== Release ==
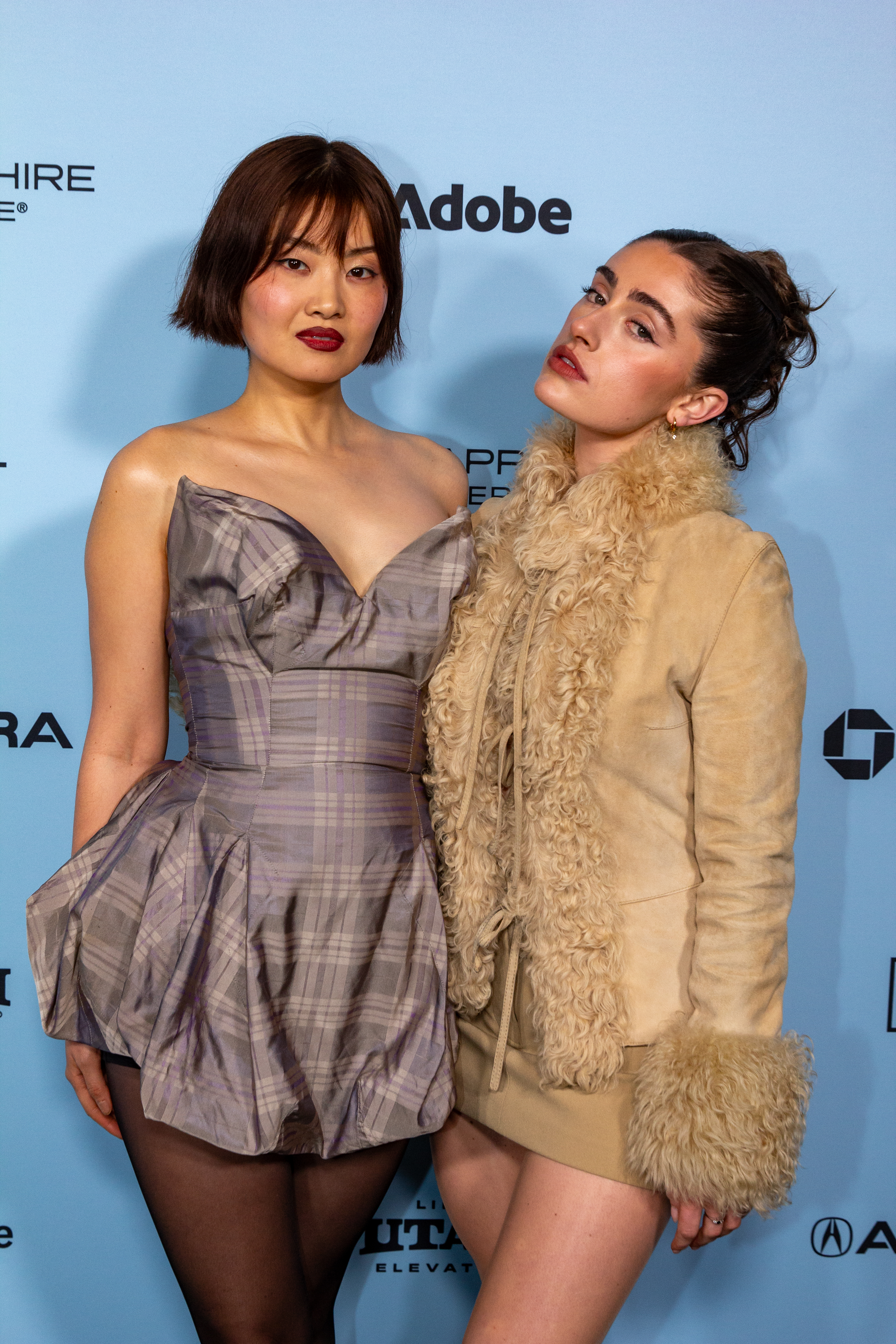
Katarina Zhu and Sennott at Sundance premiere of Bunnylovr in 2025

The film premiered on January 25, 2025, at the 2025 Sundance Film Festival as part of the U.S. Dramatic Competition. In February 2026, Utopia acquired North American theatrical-distribution rights to the film, released in the United States on April 10.

== Reception ==
On the review aggregator website Rotten Tomatoes, 63% of 35 critics' reviews are positive, with an average rating of 5.2/10. The website's consensus reads: "Bunnylovr is a daring debut by Katarina Zhu, but its lack of focus makes its meandering plot more frustrating than effective." Metacritic, which uses a weighted average, assigned the film a score of 55 out of 100, based on 10 critics, indicating "mixed or average" reviews.

Lovia Gyarkye of The Hollywood Reporter wrote, "Bunnylovr's strengths are in its engaging character study of a languid young woman who came of age online. It's not a novel portrait, but Zhu makes it wholly her own. We watch Becca, a Chinese-American woman, float from one interaction to the next, eliding the intimacy of being present." Katie Rife of IndieWire graded the film a B−.

Chase Hutchinson of TheWrap wrote, "It’s a flawed debut feature — there is a fundamental distance between us and the film's main character — but Zhu shows immense promise."
