= The Zombies: Hung Up on a Dream =

- Film poster
- Directed by: Robert Schwartzman
- Produced by: Russell Wayne Groves; Robert Schwartzman
- Cinematography: Michael Rizzi
- Edited by: Meryl Goodwin; Chris Donlon
- Music by: The Zombies; Robert Schwartzman; Benjamin Messelbeck
- Production companies: Utopia; Playtone
- Distributed by: Utopia
- Release dates: March 12, 2023 (South by Southwest); May 12, 2025 (United States)
- Running time: 99 minutes
- Country: United States
- Language: English
- Box office: $122,165

The Zombies: Hung Up on a Dream is a 2023 American documentary film directed and produced by Robert Schwartzman. The film follows British band The Zombies who reflect on 60 years of their path from teenage friends to legends in the Rock and Roll Hall of Fame.

The film had its world premiere at the South by Southwest on March 15, 2023, and was released in the United States on May 12, 2025.

== Synopsis ==
British Invasion icons The Zombies reflect on paving 60 years and counting of their musical path from teenage friends to legends in the Rock and Roll Hall of Fame.

== Production ==
The film was announced in July 2022, with Rooney frontman Robert Schwartzman serving as the director and Utopia and Playtone producing.

== Release ==
The Zombies: Hung Up on a Dream had its world premiere at the South by Southwest on March 12, 2023. Utopia released the film with special event screenings at Washington D.C., Boston, Austin, Pittsburgh, and Seattle on May 12, 2025, which was later followed by full theatrical engagements at New York and Los Angeles at the Quad Cinema and the Landmark NuArt Theatre respectively on May 16.

== Reception ==
Writing for Film Inquiry, Kristy Strouse stated "It’s the time and season of the resurgence of The Zombies. I thought this was a wonderfully illuminating look at the talented 60s rock band, that any fan or lover of music should visit." Peter Sobczynski of The Spool wrote "[L]eave[s] viewers with a newfound admiration for The Zombies’ legacy and tenacity and a hunger to seek out still more of their songs."
