= Stadia =

Stadia may refer to:

== Measurements ==
- Stadia mark, crosshairs on the reticle of a theodolite or other surveying instrument
- Stadiametric rangefinding (also stadia method), a technique of measuring distances with a telescopic instrument
- Stadion (unit) (plural: stadia), an ancient Greek unit of length

== Other uses ==
- Google Stadia, a defunct cloud gaming service
- Helsinki Polytechnic Stadia, a multidisciplinary institution of higher education
- Stadia (Caria), a town of ancient Caria
- Stadium (plural: stadiums or stadia), a place or venue for (mostly) outdoor sports, concerts or other events

== See also ==
- Stadion (disambiguation)
- Stadium (disambiguation)
