= Eli Keszler =

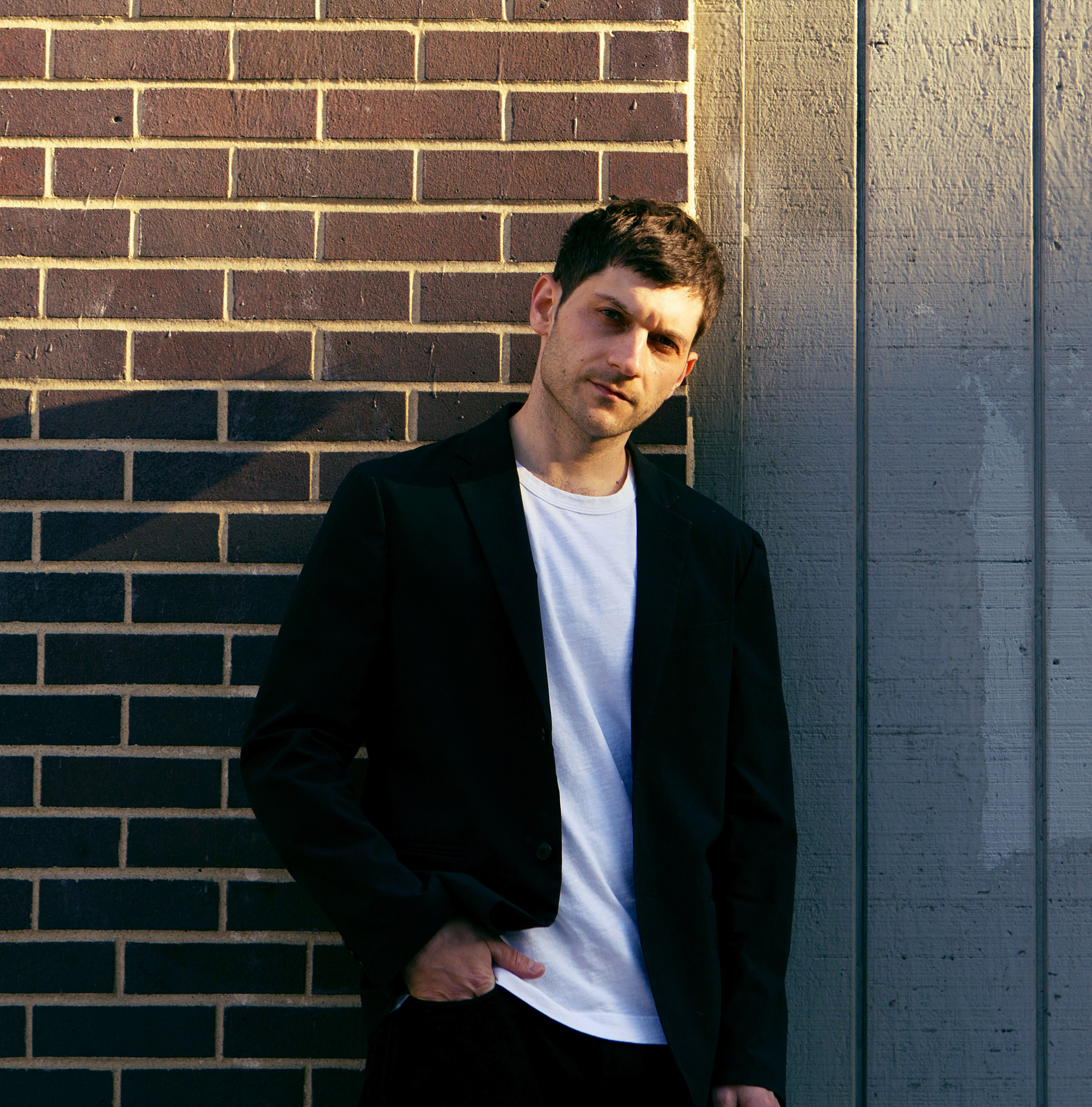
- Eli Keszler

Background information
- Born: Brookline, Massachusetts
- Genres: Experimental; avant-garde jazz; sound art; ambient
- Occupations: Composer, visual artist, multi-instrumentalist
- Instruments: Percussion, guitar, etc.
- Years active: early 2000s–present
- Labels: Pan Records, REL Records, NNA Tapes, Forced Exposure, ESP-Disk, Dancing Wayang, Rare Youth Records, Lucky Me
- Website: EliKeszler.com

Eli Keszler is an American percussionist, composer, and visual artist based in New York City. Known for his complex and intricate style of drumming, as well creating sound installations involving piano wire and other mechanisms to accompany his live performances, his shows have involved visual elements such as Keszler's drawings, diagrams, screen prints, and writings. In 2012, Pitchfork wrote that "Keszler deserves recent attention for his large-scale sound art installations, which not only force musical ideas to interact with an acoustic environment but, in turn, for flesh-and-bone musicians to interact with both of them."

Keszler has also toured or collaborated with artists such as Tony Conrad, Jandek, Loren Connors, the Iceland Symphony Orchestra and Oneohtrix Point Never, and has released several solo albums since 2008. He has also performed and released music as Pedagogy, with producer Nate Boyce. Alps in 2014, was a collaboration with guitarist Oren Ambarchi. In 2012 Keszler debuted a sound installation project where he mounted wires up to 800 feet long off the Manhattan Bridge.

He has had exhibitions of his visual work, installations and performances at museums and galleries such as the Victoria & Albert Museum, The Kitchen, South London Gallery, LUMA Foundation, Tectonics Festival in Reykjavík, Centraal Museum in Utrecht, and Boston Center for the Arts. He and David Grubbs recently debuted a piece at the MIT List Center.

== Early life and education ==
Eli Keszler was born in Brookline, Massachusetts. By the age of eight he was learning drums, and he began composing his own music at age twelve. He began playing in various rock and hardcore bands in his teenage years, and later graduated from the New England Conservatory of Music in Boston. Upon graduation he moved to Providence, Rhode Island and then to New York City. He is Jewish.

== Career ==
=== 2000s: Early installations and albums ===
Working as a drummer, guitarist, and composer in New York, Keszler soon became known for accompanying his music performances with live installations and visual elements, sometimes utilizing drawings, diagrams, screen prints, and writings. His sound installations and visual pieces "often use microprocessor-controlled motors to strike, scrape and vibrate various lengths of piano wire as well as other materials." He released his first album, Livingston, in 2008 on Rare Youth Records, which was followed by Oxtim in 2010 on ESP-Disk.

=== 2011-14: Cold Pin and collaborations ===
Keszler released his album Cold Pin in 2011, on Pan Records. In the summer of 2011, Wire Magazine hosted streams of Keszler's live music on their website. Wire described one track as "a recording of a quintet performing with Keszler's 14 string, 40 x 15 foot mechanical sound installation, Cold Pin. The installation consists of 'three to five 25 foot long strings with motors, wire, a curved wall, micro-controllers, pick-ups and phono cables'." His ensemble included Ashley Paul on saxophone, Geoff Mullen on guitar, and others. In 2012 another of his sound installations was featured in Pitchfork, who wrote that "Keszler deserves recent attention for his large-scale sound art installations, which not only force musical ideas to interact with an acoustic environment but, in turn, for flesh-and-bone musicians to interact with both of them."

External videos
- "Collecting Basin" installation in Shreveport, Louisiana in October 2011
- "L-Carrier" - solo performance on drums w/ installation in 2012

He has released a number of solo albums since then, and has toured or collaborated with other such as Ashley Paul, C. Spencer Yeh, Loren Connors, and the Iceland Symphony Orchestra. He has performed at number of national and international festivals, including Transmediale Festival in 2013, where he performed with the Iceland Symphony Orchestra. In 2013 some of his drawings were replicated in the art book Neum, in tandem with a 2013 exhibit of his work at the South London Gallery. He recently debuted a project where he mounted wires up to 800 feet long off the Manhattan Bridge which was commissioned by National Public Radio.

=== 2014: Alps, Stadium, and tour with Oneohtrix Point Never ===
In November 2014, Keszler released the collaborative album Alps, which he recorded with Oren Ambarchi, an experimental guitarist and composer. Alps was written as a two-part suite divided into two tracks. Music critic Fred Thomas of AllMusic gave Alps 4/5 stars, writing that "these duets merge Ambarchi's symphonic and sometimes storytelling feedback with nonstop blasts of scattershot drumming from Keszler for an attack of noisy improvisation. Keszler's fluid and anxiety-ridden percussion style is a perfect companion for Ambarchi's grizzly guitar stabs and horror movie drones."

2016 saw the release of Last Signs of Speed, Keszler's eighth studio album, through the German label Empty Editions.

In 2018, Keszler released his ninth studio album, Stadium, through Shelter Press to positive reviews. That same year, Keszler was a collaborator on American electronic musician Oneohtrix Point Never's Age Of. He also toured with him among other artists for the album's accompanying performance installation, MYRIAD. In 2019 Keszler released the Empire EP, his final release with Shelter Press.

=== 2021 ===
In July 2021, Keszler released his tenth studio album, Icons, on LuckyMe.

=== 2022 ===
Keszler provided the musical score for Alex Lee Moyer's film Alex's War and attended the premier in Austin, Texas.

=== 2023 ===
Keszler collaborated with American electronic producer Skrillex on his album Quest for Fire for the track "A Street I Know".

== Visual art and installation ==
In conjunction with his performances he has had exhibitions of his visual work installations at the Victoria & Albert Museum, The Kitchen, South London Gallery, LUMA Foundation, Harpa Hall at the Tectonics Festival in Reykjavík, Centraal Museum in Utrecht, Boston Center for the Arts, Barbican - St. Lukes amongst other places. In 2014, he presented a performance/installation with David Grubbs at the MIT List Center. An article on his work was featured in Modern Painters Magazine, focusing on his drawing, score writing and installation.

== Style and influences ==
"Mr. Keszler’s work presents several paradoxes. A percussionist with roots in punk rock and free improvisation, he fuses chaos and order in his drumming: a burble and clatter akin to what European drummers like Tony Oxley and Han Bennink invented in the late 1960s to distinguish their work from American free jazz...."
— The New York Times (2012)

Keszler is known for incorporating the sounds of diverse genres, including punk rock, free jazz, and free improvisation. About his tendencies as a composer, Keszler has stated "Oftentimes, musically I find myself attracted to things that are so slow they seem fast and so fast they seem slow—when you have so many hits that they eventually turn into a long tone." He explained to NPR's All Things Considered, "I like to work with raw material, simple sounds, primitive or very old sounds."

His live performances often are fused with sound installation and visual art, and various guest artists have contributed. The New York Times described Keszler's work as "using rigorously conceived scores to harness the inchoate energy of improvisation and its capacity for surprise."

== Discography ==
=== Albums ===
Selected albums by Eli Keszler
Year	Album title	Release details
2008	Livingston	Released: 2008; Label: Rare Youth Records
2010	Oxtirn	Released: Jun 7, 2011; Label: ESP-Disk
2011	Cold Pin	Released: 2011; Label: Pan Records
2012	Catching Net	Released: 2012; Label: Forced Exposure/Pan
2012	Split LP	Released: 2012; Label: NNA Tapes
2014	Alps (with Oren Ambarchi)	Released: Nov 11, 2014; Label: Dancing Wayang
2016	Last Signs of Speed	Released: Nov 25, 2016; Label: Empty Editions
2018	Stadium	Released: Oct 12, 2018; Label: Shelter Press
2021	Icons	Released: June 25, 2021; Label: LuckyMe
2025	Eli Keszler	Released: May 2, 2025; Label: LuckyMe

=== Soundtracks and scores ===
- The Scary of Sixty-First (2021)
- Harka (2022)
- Alex's War (2022)
- Pet Shop Days (2023)
- Bad Shabbos (2024)
- www.RachelOrmont.com (2024)
- Bunnylovr (2025)
- The Basics of Philosophy (2026)

== Personal life ==
Keszler has a son with Anna Khachiyan, born in 2021.

== See also ==
- Musical improvisation
