= Tahara (film) =

- Poster
- Directed by: Olivia Peace
- Written by: Jess Zeidman
- Produced by: Jess Zeidman; Dasha Gorin; Madison Ginsberg
- Starring: Madeline Grey DeFreece; Rachel Sennott
- Cinematography: Tehillah De Castro
- Edited by: Troy Lewis; Olivia Peace
- Distributed by: Film Movement
- Release dates: January 2020 (Slamdance); June 10, 2022 (United States)
- Running time: 77 minutes
- Country: United States
- Language: English

Tahara is a 2020 American drama film directed by Olivia Peace and written by Jess Zeidman. It premiered at the 2020 Slamdance Film Festival and was released to wide audiences on June 10, 2022. Tahara received awards from Outfest, Newfest, and the Denver International Film Festival.

== Plot ==
The movie stars Madeline Grey DeFreece and Rachel Sennott as high schoolers Carrie and Hannah who kiss at the funeral of a Hebrew School classmate who died by suicide. The girls' grieving process gives way to a journey of self-discovery and sexual coming-of-age awakening as Carrie starts to develop feelings for Hannah.

== Cast and characters ==
- Madeline Grey DeFreece as Carrie Lowstein
- Rachel Sennott as Hannah Rosen
- Daniel Taveras as Tristan Leibotwitz
- Bernadette Quigley as Moreh Klein
- Shlomit Azoulay as Elaina Cohen
- Juliano Mer-Khamis as Nagim

== Production ==
Tahara is the feature film debut for director Olivia Peace and screenwriter Jess Zeidman. The movie is shot primarily in a square aspect ratio of 1.2:1. At times claymation and animation are used to illustrate the lead characters' inner lives. The cinematographer was Tehillah De Castro.

== Release ==
The film was released at Slamdance 2020 in January and later screened at NewFest 2020, TIFF, and Outfest 2020. Tahara was released in theaters on June 10, 2022.

== Reception ==
Tahara holds a 97% on Rotten Tomatoes based on 31 critics' reviews. Teo Bugbee of the New York Times selected Tahara as a NYT Critic's Pick and stated in the review, "This is a canny, compact portrait of teenage insensitivity, all the more riveting for its biting dialogue and funny performances." In a similarly positive review, Film Inquiry's Kristy Strouse wrote, "Peace and Zeidman's collaboration proves to be a touching, (heartbreaking at times) story that takes one day and shows the momentous connotations of it." Autostraddle critic Drew Gregory praised the cast and writing: "It's a cast that lives up to the obviously hilarious and subtly complex script from Jess Zeidman. There are enough jokes and hijinks that its depth and emotion surprise and continue surprising after the film has ended." Alan Ng rated the film 8.5/10 for Film Threat and praised the comic aspects of the film: "I would also be remiss in not highlighting how funny Tahara is. The note-writing conversion during the memorial service is amazing, and the joke of it is present and never called out by the film. Then add the school counselor and her class handouts about how grief is handled in the Jewish tradition; it's all priceless."

== Accolades ==
- 2020 – Winner, Best Directorial Feature Debut of a Black LGBTQ+ Filmmaker, NewFest
- 2020 – Winner, Special Mention, LA Outfest
- 2020 – Nominee, Best Narrative Feature, Slamdance Film Festival
- 2021 – Winner, Best Feature Film, Denver International Film Festival

== See also ==
- Shiva Baby
