= Stadium Arena =

Stadium Arena may refer to:

- Stadium Arena (Denver), Colorado, United States, a Denver Landmark
- DeltaPlex Arena in Walker, United States
- Stadium Arena (Norrköping) in Norrköping, Sweden
