= Utopia (company) =

Film production company in the US

- Industry: Film industry
- Founder: Robert Schwartzman; Cole Harper
- Headquarters: Los Angeles, California, U.S.
- Area served: Worldwide
- Divisions: Utopia Originals; Altavod
- Website: utopiadistribution.com

Utopia is an American film production, distribution and sales agency founded in 2018 by Robert Schwartzman and Cole Harper. The company is best known for releasing films Mickey and the Bear (2019), Bloody Nose, Empty Pockets (2020), Shiva Baby, Vortex (2021), We're All Going to the World's Fair, and Sharp Stick (2022).

== History ==
In February 2019, it was announced Robert Schwartzman and Cole Harper had launched Utopia, a film production, distribution, and sales company. The company's first releases were Fiddlin directed by Julie Simone, American Dharma directed by Errol Morris, and Mickey and the Bear directed by Annabelle Attanasio, in November 2019. The company also handled international sales on Sword of Trust directed by Lynn Shelton.

In September 2020, the company launched its Altavod division to provide distributors and filmmakers with full control of distribution of their film projects, with 91% of sales going directly to the filmmakers.

In November 2020, Utopia launched Utopia Originals which would additionally handle the sales of television projects.

== Filmography ==
=== 2010s ===
List of Utopia films in 2010s
Release date	Title	Notes
August 27, 2019	Fiddlin	
November 1, 2019	American Dharma	
November 15, 2019	Mickey and the Bear	

=== 2020s ===
List of Utopia films in 2020s
Release date	Title	Notes
July 1, 2020	Suzy Q	
July 10, 2020	Bloody Nose, Empty Pockets	
September 15, 2020	House of Cardin	
September 21, 2020	Turning Point	
December 4, 2020	Minor Premise	
December 22, 2020	The Emoji Story	
February 12, 2021	Crestone	
March 16, 2021	Martha: A Picture Story	
April 2, 2021	Shiva Baby	
April 30, 2021	Golden Arm	
April 30, 2021	Dope is Death	
August 10, 2021	Materna	
September 24, 2021	El Planeta	
October 6, 2021	Show Me the Picture: The Story of Jim Marshall	
October 19, 2021	Red Heaven	
November 9, 2021	The Dilemma of Desire	
December 24, 2021	The Scary of Sixty-First	
January 18, 2022	Saul at Night	
March 8, 2022	Adventures in Success	
March 18, 2022	Jane by Charlotte	
April 22, 2022	We're All Going to the World's Fair	
April 29, 2022	Vortex	
May 3, 2022	Inbetween Girl	
July 29, 2022	Sharp Stick	
October 28, 2022	Holy Spider	
April 12, 2023	Sick of Myself	
October 13, 2023	Divinity	
October 20, 2023	Another Body	co-distribution with Willa
December 1, 2023	The Sweet East	
February 9, 2024	Drift	
February 23, 2024	Drugstore June	
March 22, 2024	Femme	
June 7, 2024	I Used to Be Funny	
June 21, 2024	Chestnut	
July 23, 2024	The Good Half	
September 6, 2024	Red Rooms	
September 13, 2024	Trilogy: New Wave	
September 27, 2024	Megalopolis	co-distribution with Lionsgate
October 18, 2024	The Line	
December 13, 2024	The Last Showgirl	Produced by and U.S. sales representative only; distributed by Roadside Attractions
January 24, 2025	Not An Artist	
February 7, 2025	I Love You Forever	
February 28, 2025	The Accidental Getaway Driver	
March 15, 2025	Pet Shop Days	
March 20, 2025	A Rad Documentary	
May 2, 2025	Pavements	
May 12, 2025	The Zombies: Hung Up on a Dream	
July 9, 2025	Hot Spring Shark Attack!	
August 28, 2025	Megadoc	
September 5, 2025	Pools	
September 19, 2025	In Whose Name?	Sales rights representative with Goodfellas
October 3, 2025	Are We Good?	
October 24, 2025	In Our Blood	
February 27, 2026	Idiotka	
March 20, 2026	I Live Here Now	
April 8, 2026	Mermaid	
April 10, 2026	Bunnylovr	
May 15, 2026	Forge	
May 22, 2026	Situations	
June 10, 2026	Honeyjoon	
July 23, 2026	Summer Tour	
August 4, 2026	Rhythm Is a Dancer	

=== Undated films ===
Upcoming Utopia films without release dates
Release date	Title	Notes
2026	Lost and Found	
2026	The Projectionist	
