= Stadium (album) =

Studio album by Eli Keszler
- Released: October 12, 2018
- Genre: Avant-garde jazz; experimental
- Length: 51:24
- Label: Shelter Press
- Producer: Eli Keszler

Eli Keszler chronology
Last Signs of Speed (2016)	Stadium (2018)

Professional ratings
Aggregate scores
Source	Rating
Metacritic	82/100
Review scores
Source	Rating
Exclaim!	7/10
Pitchfork	8/10
PopMatters	8/10

Stadium is the ninth studio album by American percussionist Eli Keszler. It was released in October 2018 under Shelter Press.

== Track listing ==
No.	Title	Length
1.	"Measurement Doesn't Change The System At All"	4:19
2.	"Lotus Awnings"	4:55
3.	"We Live In Pathetic Temporal Urgency"	7:26
4.	"Flying Floor For U.S. Airways"	3:53
5.	"Simple Act Of Inverting The Episode"	3:50
6.	"Which Swarms Around It"	2:44
7.	"Fifty Four To Madrid"	3:18
8.	"French Lick"	4:11
9.	"Was The Singing Bellowing"	3:34
10.	"The Driver Stops"	3:35
11.	"Fashion Of Echo"	4:44
12.	"Bell Underpinnings"	4:50

== Accolades ==
Publication	Accolade	Rank	Ref.
Fact	Top 50 Albums of 2018	44	
Tiny Mix Tapes	Top 50 Albums of 2018	11	
The Wire	Top 50 Albums of 2018	13	
