= Stadium (software) =

STADIUM (Software for Transport and Degradation In Unsaturated Materials) is a service life prediction method which uses finite element software in conjunction with certified lab testing to determine the service life of exposed reinforced concrete.

== Development ==
=== SUMMA ===
STADIUM was originally developed in the late 1990s for in-house use by SIMCO Technologies, then an engineering firm specialised in the aging of concrete structures. STADIUM uses time-step finite element analysis to simulate the progress of harmful ions (including chloride, sulphate, and hydroxide) through concrete, by considering the chemical and physical properties of the concrete being analysed.

As the US Navy needed a tool to accurately predict the degradation of waterfront concrete structures, SIMCO Technologies and its U.S. partner, the RJLee Group, were awarded Small Business Innovative Research (SBIR) funds from the US Navy for a Phase I feasibility study in 2002. In 2003, Phase II funds were awarded to the team to fully integrate chloride ingress and corrosion initiation prediction in STADIUM. Several industrial partners also joined this effort: Lafarge, Holcim, Euclid, BASF, Sika, MMFX, and Grace Chemicals. The consortium was called SUMMA.

The main outcomes of this research phase were:

- Integration of ionic exchange in the chemical module to model chloride binding.
- Determination of the chloride corrosion threshold based on the modified G109 test procedure (some of these tests are still ongoing).
- Integration of temperature effects in the model.
- Determination of transport properties for more than 20 concrete mixtures.
- Development of a Graphical User Interface for STADIUM.

=== SUMMA2 ===
STADIUM development continued with the second phase of the SUMMA research program (SUMMA2), leading to the commercialisation of STADIUM 2.9 to coincide with the specification of STADIUM service life modelling for new waterfront constructions for the US Navy.

=== STADIUM 2.99 ===
STADIUM 2.99 is currently the most recent build of the STADIUM client. Being a web-based program, a user's files are accessible from any other computer with the STADIUM 2.99 client installed, and requires a secure username and password to access.

=== STADIUM Lab ===
As the STADIUM model relies on laboratory testing, STADIUM Lab is the software component required by concrete laboratories in order to characterize concrete for use in STADIUM, as well as service life quality control. Only labs accredited by SIMCO Technologies are qualified to perform STADIUM Lab testing.

== Applications ==
STADIUM has been used as quality control for US Navy projects such as the Kilo Wharf extension project in Guam, the Modular Hybrid Pier, and evaluations of the Pearl Harbor Dry Docks.

State Departments of Transport have also begun using STADIUM, such as the NJDOT's use of STADIUM for analysis of the Route 21 Southbound Viaduct in Newark, New Jersey.
