= Shiva Baby =

2020 film by Emma Seligman

- Release poster
- Directed by: Emma Seligman
- Screenplay by: Emma Seligman
- Based on: Shiva Baby by Emma Seligman
- Produced by: Kieran Altmann; Katie Schiller; Lizzie Shapiro
- Starring: Rachel Sennott; Molly Gordon; Polly Draper; Danny Deferrari; Fred Melamed; Dianna Agron
- Cinematography: Maria Rusche
- Edited by: Hanna A. Park
- Music by: Ariel Marx
- Production companies: Dimbo Pictures; It Doesn't Suck Productions; Bad Mensch Productions; Thick Media; Neon Heart Productions; 7 Sennotts; Irving Harvey
- Distributed by: Utopia
- Release dates: March 15, 2020 (SXSW); April 2, 2021 (United States)
- Running time: 78 minutes
- Country: United States
- Language: English
- Budget: $200,000
- Box office: $359,247

Shiva Baby is a 2020 American comedy film written and directed by Emma Seligman, in her feature directorial debut. The film stars Rachel Sennott as Danielle, a directionless young bisexual Jewish woman who attends a shiva with her parents, Joel (Fred Melamed) and Debbie (Polly Draper). Other attendees include her successful ex-girlfriend Maya (Molly Gordon) and her sugar daddy Max (Danny Deferrari), his wife Kim (Dianna Agron), and their screaming baby. It also features Jackie Hoffman, Deborah Offner, Rita Gardner, and Sondra James in supporting roles.

Adapted from Seligman's own 2018 short film of the same name, Shiva Baby premiered online at the 2020 South by Southwest film festival, while its first public screenings were at the 2020 Toronto International Film Festival, due to the COVID-19 pandemic. It was released in theaters and on video on demand in the United States on April 2, 2021, by Utopia. The events of the film take place almost entirely in real time and at one location as Danielle explores her romantic and career prospects under the intense watch of her family, friends, and judgmental neighbors.

Shiva Baby received positive reviews from critics, who praised Seligman's screenplay and direction, cast performances, musical score, representation of bisexuality and Jewish culture, and for effectively conveying anxiety-inducing claustrophobia. The film would go on to win several awards.

== Plot ==
College senior Danielle and her sugar daddy Max have sex before she hurries to a shiva observance with her parents, Joel and Debbie. Before the shiva, at her aunt Sheila's house, Danielle is schooled by her mother on how to respond to questions about her disorganized life and reveals that Danielle's ex-girlfriend Maya will be there. Within the house, members of the local extended Jewish community compare her to Maya, who is adored by the neighbors and heading to law school. She has trouble eating the food there and goes from piling it on her plate to scraping it off.

Max, who is a former colleague of Joel's, arrives, and Debbie insists on introducing him to Danielle in the hopes that one of Max's relatives will hire her. After the conversation, Debbie warns Dani that he's off limits because Max is married to a non-Jewish woman named Kim. Because of their baby-sitter's last minute cancellation, Kim arrives late to the gathering with their baby Rose.

Dani accidentally hurts her leg and retreats to the bathroom to clean the wound, where she impulsively takes a topless photo and sends it to Max. However downstairs, she is unable to look away from Max and his family, and offers to clean vomit from an adjacent room in order to escape. Maya comes to help and begins flirting with Dani, who rebukes her advances. Debbie pulls her away and reprimands her for flirting with Maya.

Debbie drags Dani to meet Kim and asks her for a job on Dani's behalf. During the conversation, it is revealed that Dani has been getting deposits once a month and telling her parents it is from baby-sitting. It is also revealed that Kim is the breadwinner of the family and therefore unknowingly funding Max's arrangement with Danielle. Kim grows suspicious when she notices Danielle wearing the same expensive bracelet that Max had given to her. Max suddenly receives all the photos that Dani sent, and ends up dropping his phone, then spilling coffee on Danielle. Her mom takes her to wash off and calm her nerves.

Maya later finds her at the food table, but Max interrupts the two; annoyed, Maya loudly reveals details of her and Danielle's past relationship, including when two went to prom together and were intimate together afterwards. Maya gets called away, and Max asks for reassurance that everything is "good" and Dani says yes. Later in the day, Max separates from his wife to go to the bathroom upstairs. Dani follows him into the bathroom and positions herself to fellate him, but she hesitates and Max leaves.

Upset, Danielle goes outside, finding Maya smoking by the side of the house. The two admit that they miss each other and passionately kiss. Dani finally can eat again, and goes to join Max and Kim, having a measured conversation in which she asks probing questions about Kim and Max's relationship and hints that Max uses the couple's vacant SoHo apartment as a bachelor pad. Elsewhere, Maya finds Danielle's phone in the bathroom and reads notifications from the sugar baby app. Dani realizes her phone is missing, and runs to Maya for help finding it, who is back downstairs by the food table. Angry, Maya taunts Danielle about her lifestyle and tells her that her phone is unlocked somewhere in the house, sending her into a panic so all she can focus on are people shoving food into their mouths.

The guests then gather to say Kaddish, with Rose screaming until Kim takes her away. Max follows Danielle into the kitchen afterwards, where she replies that ending the relationship is good so that Kim won't lose all her money. Kim then appears and tells Max they should go home.

Kim approaches Dani to return her phone, and forces her to hold Rose, insisting she must be able to as a baby-sitter. Max arrives and tries to take the baby from Dani against Kim's demands, which knocks her back and causes a vase and sacred books to the floor. Danielle attempts to clean up the mess but has a breakdown on the floor in front of the guests and is comforted by her mother and Maya. Debbie suggests they use helping an elderly attendee to her car as an excuse to leave, and Maya and Danielle reconnect as they carry food outside. Kim, Max, Maya, and Maya's mom are persuaded to ride home in Joel's now overpacked van, with Rose shrieking as Joel struggles to find his keys. Maya and Danielle affectionately hold hands in the back and smile at each other.

== Cast ==
- Rachel Sennott as Danielle
- Molly Gordon as Maya
- Danny Deferrari as Max
- Polly Draper as Debbie
- Fred Melamed as Joel
- Dianna Agron as Kim Beckett
- Jackie Hoffman as Susan
- Cilda Shaur as Sheila
- Glynis Bell as Katherine
- Sondra James as Maureen
- Rita Gardner as Mrs. Bronstein
- Deborah Offner as Ellie
- Vivien Landau as Roz
- Ariel Eliaz as Rabbi

== Production ==
=== Development and funding ===
Shiva Baby is an expansion of writer-director Emma Seligman's 2018 short film of the same title, which she had made as her thesis project while studying film at New York University Tisch School of the Arts (NYU). The title refers both to Danielle and to the baby brought to the shiva, Rose. Seligman said that she felt there was room to expand on the short from early on, but needed motivation from lead actress Rachel Sennott to start working on a feature; the feature film entered production just before the short premiered at the 2018 South by Southwest (SXSW) film festival. Despite the short being accepted to SXSW, giving Seligman confidence, nobody there was interested in making a low-budget feature. Seligman then approached Katie Schiller, who she said was "the best producer in [their graduating class]", at Sennott's encouragement. While developing the feature, Seligman re-watched Gia Coppola's film Palo Alto, saying that she had "never seen a film so accurately portray the suffocating and debilitating nature of young female insecurities" like it. Seligman was also inspired by Trey Edward Shults's Krisha and how its location was used for storytelling, which led to Seligman viewing Shiva Baby through a similar psychological thriller lens. Other inspiration came from the Coen brothers, Joey Soloway's Transparent, John Cassavetes, and Mike Nichols. The costume design of the film was based on outfits worn at shivas Seligman's family had attended.

Seligman said that financing Shiva Baby was "probably the hardest thing" she and the producers would do; she sought funding for the feature for a year and received some offers from organizations that requested more creative control over the film in return, which she was unwilling to give. The production also faced setback when Seligman had to return to Canada after finishing the short when her visa expired. Filmmaker Amanda Kramer, a friend of Seligman, put her in contact with Rhianon Jones of Neon Heart Productions, who became an executive producer; more investors became interested with Jones attached. Most of the financing came from outside funding and independent funding from people the production team knew. Seligman told Women and Hollywood that using primarily one location was also a financial decision. Shiva Baby's budget was around $200,000. Producer Kieran Altmann managed to secure some funding from his parents, Fiona and Martin Altmann, who are credited as executive producers. He said that the competitive filmmaking market in New York helped them work with a small budget, as they could negotiate large discounts on gear rental. The crew were also friends of the producers, and most took a cut in their usual rate, while editor Hanna Park was Seligman's roommate.

=== Themes ===
I feel like it's pretty universal – a lot of young women, young people, not having self-worth beyond sexual validation. I think it's something that hindered my self-acceptance in college, since it's something I focused a lot of energy on.

— Emma Seligman

The short film had been based on a fictional scenario combining Seligman's "uncomfortable and funny" experience of shivas, and the community of women she knew who were sugar babies at NYU. When it came to expanding the story to a feature, she chose to also draw on her own bisexuality; the desire to showcase more of the character of Danielle and her sexuality is a reason Seligman chose to make the feature. Seligman said that "if no one watches this movie except for some young bisexual women who feel seen, then I feel like I've done my job". The character of Danielle is described as relatable; she is the film's "way in" and the other characters are all seen through her eyes. Seligman was also interested in exploring Max and Kim's relationship, and Debbie and Danielle's mother–daughter relationship further, and in expanding on the central theme of Danielle finding her self-worth through sexual autonomy but "realizing that's not as powerful as she thinks it is". Variety noted that themes of empowered young women were present in several screenplays in the same season; features editor Malina Saval wrote that Shiva Baby shows through Danielle how a "pressure to be perfect manifests itself in women long before marriage and kids come into focus" and explores how the power of sex is only limited.

Karina Solórzano for the Los Cabos International Film Festival wrote that Shiva Baby has "the same elements as some of Woody Allen's most popular films – including the Jewish family and multiple lovers – but Seligman has her own vision and offers something different", and that it "follows the contrarian path promoted by [...] Disobedience, [but] this is not the central point of the plot; Seligman does not treat the [queer] protagonists as exceptional or disobedient". Solórzano also compared the themes of youth to those of Booksmart, and the tension to that of Uncut Gems, and discussed the relevance of other themes in Shiva Baby, including Danielle's insecurities; the cultural and religious conflicts surrounding Danielle's sexuality; complex female relationships; and the honesty that comes with family gatherings.

=== Casting ===
Writer-director Seligman became aware of lead actress Sennott at NYU when Sennott was acting in other students' thesis films and making comedy sketches. Thinking that she looked "like someone [Seligman] would run into at a family event", Seligman cast Sennott in their own thesis film, the Shiva Baby short. Sennott was kept on as Danielle when Seligman began expanding Shiva Baby into a feature-length film; they had formed a collaborative bond and Seligman "never even thought about casting someone else", though, unlike her character, Sennott is neither queer nor Jewish. When media began criticizing Jewface, Sennott as Danielle was frequently mentioned. She worked with Seligman to develop the character over the two years of production from the beginning of the short film to the feature, and read all of Seligman's screenplay drafts. Some of the film's potential financiers asked the producers to consider replacing Sennott with a bigger name star. Besides Sennott, the first actor to be cast was Molly Gordon, who was cast as Danielle's love interest, Maya, without a chemistry read with Sennott; they only met the day before filming began. Seligman says she experienced impostor syndrome working with the cast, especially after holding a rehearsal for a scene between Danielle and Maya but not being able to make it work. After Gordon, Dianna Agron was cast as Kim. Agron was in Israel when she was sent the script, and met with Seligman in New York shortly after returning. Seligman said that, as a Jewish actress, Agron was excited to "finally" be in a Jewish film, despite playing the only character who is not Jewish. Through conversation with Agron, lines were added alluding to her character having Jewish heritage. Producer Lizzie Shapiro told Ynet that Agron "brought to the role a different dynamic of what it means to be a Jew who looks like [she does]". Commenters have said that Agron's casting is an example of intertextuality and "a bit of an inside joke". Danny Deferrari was the last actor to be cast, accepting the role of Max a few days before shooting began.

Casting had been challenging; the film focuses on both queer and Jewish culture, so Seligman and the producers wanted to find actors who would "feel authentic to the material". Seligman felt it was important to cast Jewish actors but was open to other people if they seemed perfect for the role. They also discussed authentic queer representation with The Hindu, calling it a "trickier issue"; having spoken with actors who are not out, Seligman said that "for everyone on screen playing a queer character to be out and proud and talking about their sexuality [...] is a lot to ask of someone." Casting director Kate Geller went to the Jewish theatre community in New York for most of the cast. Due to the low budget, they looked to only cast actors based in New York City, with the exception of Fred Melamed, whom the production flew out from Los Angeles. Melamed had accepted the role of Joel based on reading the script alone. Unbeknownst to Seligman, several cast members already knew each other, such as Melamed and Polly Draper (who plays his wife Debbie), who were friends from the Yale School of Drama; they used this as an advantage on set, though Draper had originally been sought to play a different role in the film. The production had been looking for a Jewish actress to play Debbie, but Seligman said that Draper "put a spell on [them] and [they] had to say yes." Seligman's own mother also wanted Draper to play the mother character in the film. Draper improvised on-set for her character a lot, as well as adding a mother's perspective, though the production did not have time for full improvisation.

=== Filming ===
Shiva Baby was filmed over 16 days in August 2019 at an Airbnb in Flatbush, Brooklyn. Seligman chose the house on Argyle Road because of its dark wood interior and stained-glass windows providing a Yentl-like glow. The shoot was initially planned for summer 2018, which was postponed to 2019; Seligman then wanted to push it again, to 2020, to have more time to raise money, but Sennott "set a timebomb". The film mostly takes place in one location during one day. After scouting the house, Seligman built a model of the first floor out of Lego and used this to plan shots. They said that some of the main struggles related to continuity, particularly working with actors who were not always available at the same time. The production had only "two days when [they] had the entire [principal] six-person cast together at the same time". Another struggle was the baby playing Rose, who would not stop crying; Seligman said this was a "learning experience" that caused them to rework some scenes to fit in a crying baby. The opening scene, set before the shiva at Max's apartment, was filmed on the last day. Seligman, with a largely female cast and crew, felt prepared for this and other scenes involving intimacy, but discovered during filming that the scenes were more vulnerable and required more sensitivity.

An example of character Danielle's (center) anxiety shown visually through Maria Rusche's cinematography. Four characters are visible, with the three who are not Danielle distorted as she becomes more anxious.

Director of photography Maria Rusche used an Arri Alexa XT camera to shoot in fullscreen 2K resolution and Apple ProRes 4444 format, with Kowa anamorphic lenses as well as a 10:1 Cooke Cinetal zoom lens. About half of the film was shot handheld. Seligman and Rusche initially considered shooting Shiva Baby like a romantic comedy, but "the anxiety hook was what [they] found to set the tone for most of the process". Rusche discussed her equipment choices with IndieWire's Chris O'Falt, explaining that to capture the claustrophobia and anxiety in the film in the way they wanted, they needed to have Danielle surrounded by people but still allow the principal cast to play off each other. To achieve this, Rusche decided to use an anamorphic lens so that multiple characters can remain in shot together, through the wider field of view, while still being distinguished from background characters thanks to the lens's depth. They also wanted to utilize natural image distortion to emphasize Danielle's anxiety; Rusche said the effect of the Kowa lenses "helped make it feel like the walls could literally cave in on her" and had "a good balance of edge distortion without falling apart or losing too much sharpness at the edges".

=== Music ===
Seligman was uncertain if they wanted to use a score for the film when going into production, as they were aiming for realism, but chose to do so to divert focus from background chatter and represent Danielle's emotions. Seligman wanted it to have strings to reflect Klezmer music, without being overpowering, a "sweet spot" that they said composer Ariel Marx achieved. Marx also suggested adding the score to some scenes it had not originally been intended, making them more stressful. As well as composing, Marx performed strings, while Sam Mazur contributed percussion.

The score received positive reviews. Stephen Saito for Moveable Fest described the score as Marx's version of the Jaws theme. IndieWire's Jude Dry wrote that the "tense string score ratchets up the tension, though this technique loses its bite after a few too many uses", while Katie Rife of The A.V. Club praised it, likening it to the work of Harry Manfredini. Andrew Parker for The GATE also touched on the score's horror-like qualities, saying it worked well for its contribution to the claustrophobic storytelling. The Film Stage listed it as one of the best scores or soundtracks of 2021.

== Release and marketing ==
A video interview with director Emma Seligman for the Boston Jewish Film Festival

Shiva Baby was slated to premiere at the 2020 South by Southwest (SXSW); following the festival's cancellation in light of the COVID-19 pandemic, it was instead screened digitally in April 2020. The producers submitted the film to the Sundance Film Festival, and though they were given an extension on submission to work on post-production, it was not accepted. Altmann said that while it was disappointing to be rejected from a festival like Sundance, the team had been aiming for SXSW, as it was where the short premiered. It was also screened digitally at a variety of festivals in August and September 2020, and had its first physical screening at the TIFF Bell Lightbox for the 2020 Toronto International Film Festival (TIFF). In place of live events, it received cast and director Q&A sessions via video links.

In September 2020, just before its TIFF run, Utopia acquired distribution rights to Shiva Baby. It was released in select theaters and on video on demand in Canada on March 26, 2021, by Pacific Northwest Pictures, and in the United States on April 2, 2021, after movie theaters re-opened. The soundtrack was released on the same day. Utopia shopped the film to various streaming platforms: it was made available in Spain on Filmin, and in several countries on Mubi from June 11, 2021, for Pride Month. Shiva Baby also had a limited theatrical release for one night only in the United Kingdom on June 9, 2021, before it began streaming on Mubi on June 11. The film was given a wide release in Australian theaters on July 29, 2021. It has been picked up for theatrical distribution in Israel by TLVFest. It began streaming on HBO Max in July 2021, with HBO and Seligman developing a television pilot based on the premise of the film.

The first theatrical poster and trailer were released on February 18, 2021. The poster was designed by High Council, with Nylon noting that it captures the film's style; "Sennott dressed to the nines in Jewish deli couture is nothing short of pure camp." A second, red band, trailer was released on March 29, 2021, and a UK trailer followed on May 27. According to Seligman, Utopia targeted their marketing at the young queer female audience by producing content like the red band trailer. Additionally, pandemic lockdowns gave Seligman the time to engage with audiences at many film festivals, creating "if not a grassroots campaign, than a ground-up campaign", in their words. They added: "This is how we were able to find the right audience for the film, we responded to their excitement and included them in our outreach."

== Reception ==
=== Audience ===
Shiva Baby was the most-watched film on Mubi in 2021 by the start of August, and ended the year still in the top spot. It had a record-breaking sixteen-week continuous run (April 2–July 22, 2021) at the Quad Cinema in New York.

=== Critical response ===
On the review aggregator website Rotten Tomatoes, 97% of 147 critics' reviews are positive, with an average rating of 7.9/10. The website's critics consensus reads: "A ruefully funny calling card for debuting director Emma Seligman, Shiva Baby transcends its sitcom setup with strong performances and satisfying insights." Metacritic assigned the film a weighted average score of 79 out of 100, based on 24 critics, indicating "generally favorable reviews".

Brian Bromberger of The Bay Area Reporter said it "may be one of the best bisexual films ever made", and Alex de Vore of the Santa Fe Reporter said that the ending is "one of the most meaningful moments of hope ever captured on film". Madeline Ducharme of Slate's Outward called Shiva Baby and character Danielle "a step forward for bi representation on screen", and diversity-focused Incluvie's Aspen Nelson said that it "will be remembered as a crucial film of youthful Jewish representation in cinema." Sennott's performance was noted as one of the best breakouts of 2020.

Shiva Baby was praised both as and despite being a feature debut. Jon Frosch of The Hollywood Reporter said the film is worthy of comparison to films made by others later in their career, specifically saying it may be a "softer" version of the Coen brothers' A Serious Man. Other critics noted Seligman's youth in these terms; in Script magazine, Tom Stempel compared them to Orson Welles "when he made you know what", and, in Vanity Fair, Jordan Hoffman compared them to Steven Spielberg making Duel.

It also received positive reviews for its handling of modern topics. Nelson wrote that it "takes a fresh perspective on the [messy millennial] trope that mirrors experience and compels emotion". Several critics were impressed that Shiva Baby does not present Danielle's sex work negatively, and Allyson Johnson of The Young Folks felt that while the film is ostensibly coming-of-age, "what makes [it] so instantly transcendent of some of its contemporaries is how much it acknowledges that, despite Danielle's initial presentation, she's still just a brat sometimes". Others noted that while Shiva Baby is rooted in its Jewish identity, it is relatable and its awkward comedy universal. Frosch felt that the film could have explored some of its themes more deeply, and there were different views on the film's runtime: Kate Taylor of The Globe and Mail felt that it gets stretched long, while Jason Gorber of /Film wrote that the "brisk 77 minute running time means the film never overstays its welcome".

Various critics praise the characters and ensemble cast at the film's center. Juan Antonio Barquin of the Miami New Times wrote that the cast embody the specificity and complex relationships of their characters. For The Film Stage, Zhuo-Ning Su compared the ensemble to that of Ma Rainey's Black Bottom, calling them a "group of comedic genius". Frosch commented that Seligman's script may lean too much into stereotypes, but this is mitigated by the talented cast. In the lead role, Sennott was highlighted in several reviews, with Parker saying that she gave "a wonderful, star making performance". Other critics looked at the chemistry of Sennott and Gordon's characters, and highlighted other actors.

=== Accolades ===
Shiva Baby has received many awards and nominations, particularly for Seligman's writing and directing as their feature film debut, and lead actress Sennott. (Note: See the List of accolades received by Shiva Baby.) Seligman was nominated for a Directors Guild Award; casting director Kate Geller won a Casting Society of America award; and the film won the Independent Spirit John Cassavetes Award, in 2022. It also won a National Board of Review Award for 2021, and production designer Cheyenne Ford was selected to the 2021 BAFTA Breakthrough US cohort thanks to her work on the film. Between 2020 and 2022 it won a variety of critics', festival, and media titles; for 2020 and, especially, 2021, it was included on many best-of lists.

== See also ==
- Tahara (film)
