= Rachel Sennott =

American actress and comedian (born 1995)

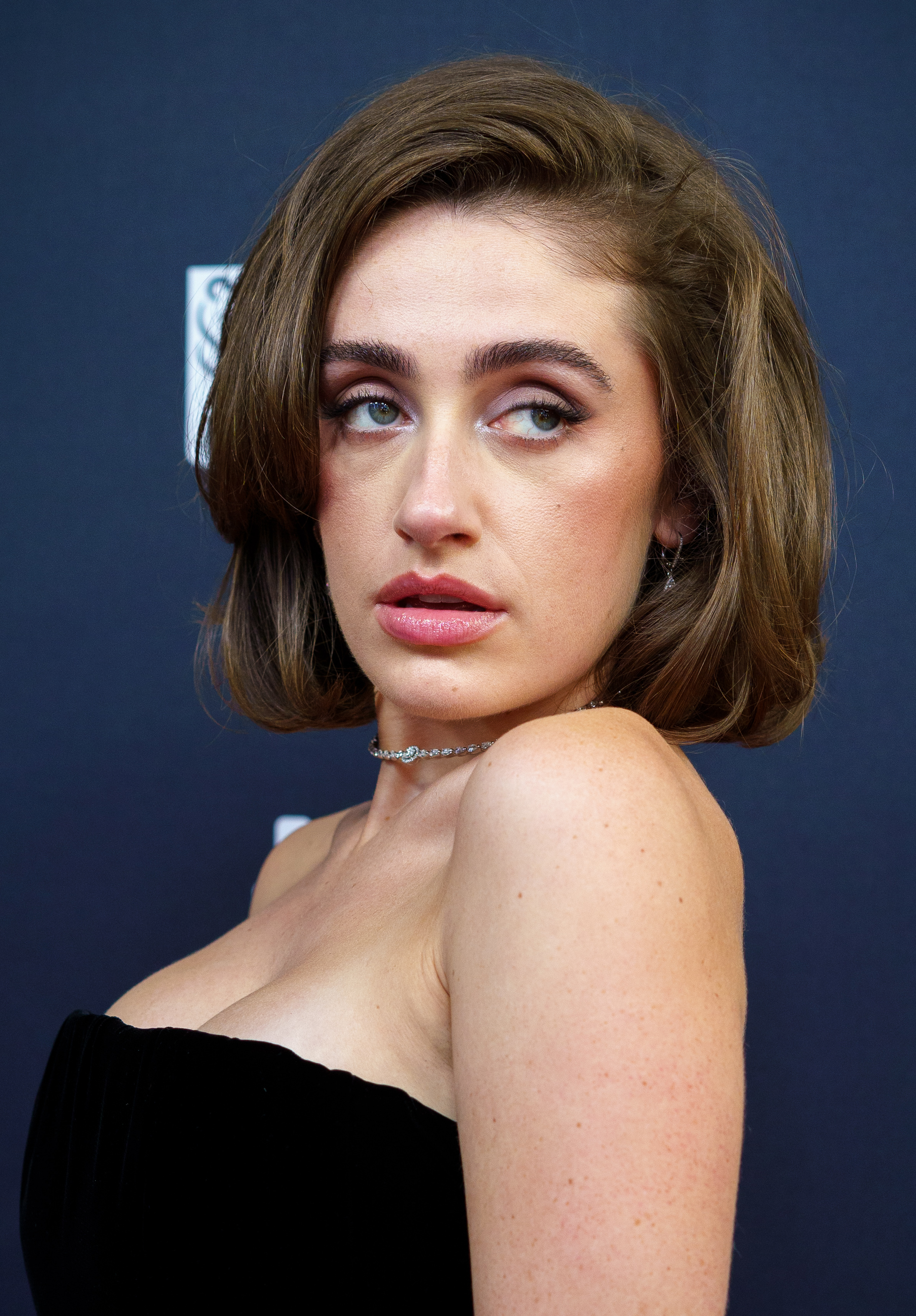
- Sennott in 2024
- Born: Rachel Anne Sennott; September 19, 1995 (age 31); Connecticut, U.S.
- Education: New York University (BFA)
- Occupations: Actress; comedian
- Years active: 2016–present

Rachel Anne Sennott (/ˈsɛnɪt/ SE-nit; born September 19, 1995) is an American actress, screenwriter and comedian. After training at the New York University Tisch School of the Arts and the Stella Adler Studio of Acting, she began her career on the New York City open mic scene and co-developed two Comedy Central shows with Ayo Edebiri.

Sennott gained critical attention for her breakout role in Shiva Baby (2020), which earned her a Gotham Award nomination for Breakthrough Actor. She followed this with film roles in the comedy Bodies Bodies Bodies (2022) and the drama I Used to Be Funny (2023). She co-wrote and starred in the satirical teen comedy Bottoms (2023). For the film, Sennott and director Emma Seligman earned a nomination for the Independent Spirit Award for Best Screenplay. In 2024, she portrayed Rosie Shuster in the biographical comedy Saturday Night.

On television, she had a supporting role in the HBO drama series The Idol (2023) and leads the HBO comedy series I Love LA (2025–present), the latter of which she also wrote and produced. She also co-created the Netflix crime comedy series Big Mistakes (2026) with Dan Levy.

== Early life and education ==
Rachel Anne Sennott was born on September 19, 1995 in Connecticut, the daughter of Donna and Jack Sennott, and has four siblings. She is of Irish and Italian descent, and was raised Catholic. She graduated from Simsbury High School in 2014.

== Career ==
=== 2016–2020: Early work in comedy ===
Sennott became interested in comedy as a freshman in college, when she went to an open mic night on a date. She studied acting at NYU Tisch and Stella Adler Studio of Acting, graduating in 2017. During college she continued to perform comedy at open mic nights, as well as acting in student films, including the lead role of Danielle in the 2017 short film version of Emma Seligman's Shiva Baby; she reprised this role in the 2020 feature film adaptation.

In 2018, feeling out of control of her fledgling career, Sennott turned to Twitter comedy; she wrote and tweeted multiple short jokes per day. In a 2020 interview for Nylon, she said she did not enjoy the Manhattan open mic scene because she felt that people were laughing at her rather than with her, and moved into the alt scene with a regular gig on It's A Guy Thing. She developed two shows in 2018: Puke Fest and Ur Gonna Slp Rlly Well Tonight. Puke Fest combines stand-up sets with a drinking game and moved to Instagram Live during the COVID-19 pandemic. Sennott's distinct comedic voice, a "messy" persona often complaining about dating and the economy, became popular in the alt scene. In 2019, she was named one of the six best comedians of the alt scene on lists from both Time Out New York and Pop Dust, which cited her unique satirical takes on aspects of millennial life and culture.

She satirizes other elements of culture, with some of her most popular bits including videos about the Los Angeles movie culture and baby-obsessed young women. A sound clip from her video, "Come on, it's LA", is sampled at the beginning of the song "Bump This" by Michael Medrano, Jake Germain, and Michete. On television, Sennott appeared in HBO's High Maintenance, and played Jackie Raines on Call Your Mother. Sennott and Ayo Edebiri co-developed two series for Comedy Central, Ayo and Rachel Are Single and Taking the Stage, which began airing on the network in 2020. Sennott also appears with Edebiri and other comedians on the web comedy-documentary series Speak Up, which seeks to amplify female voices about working in comedy.

=== 2021–2024: Transition to feature films ===
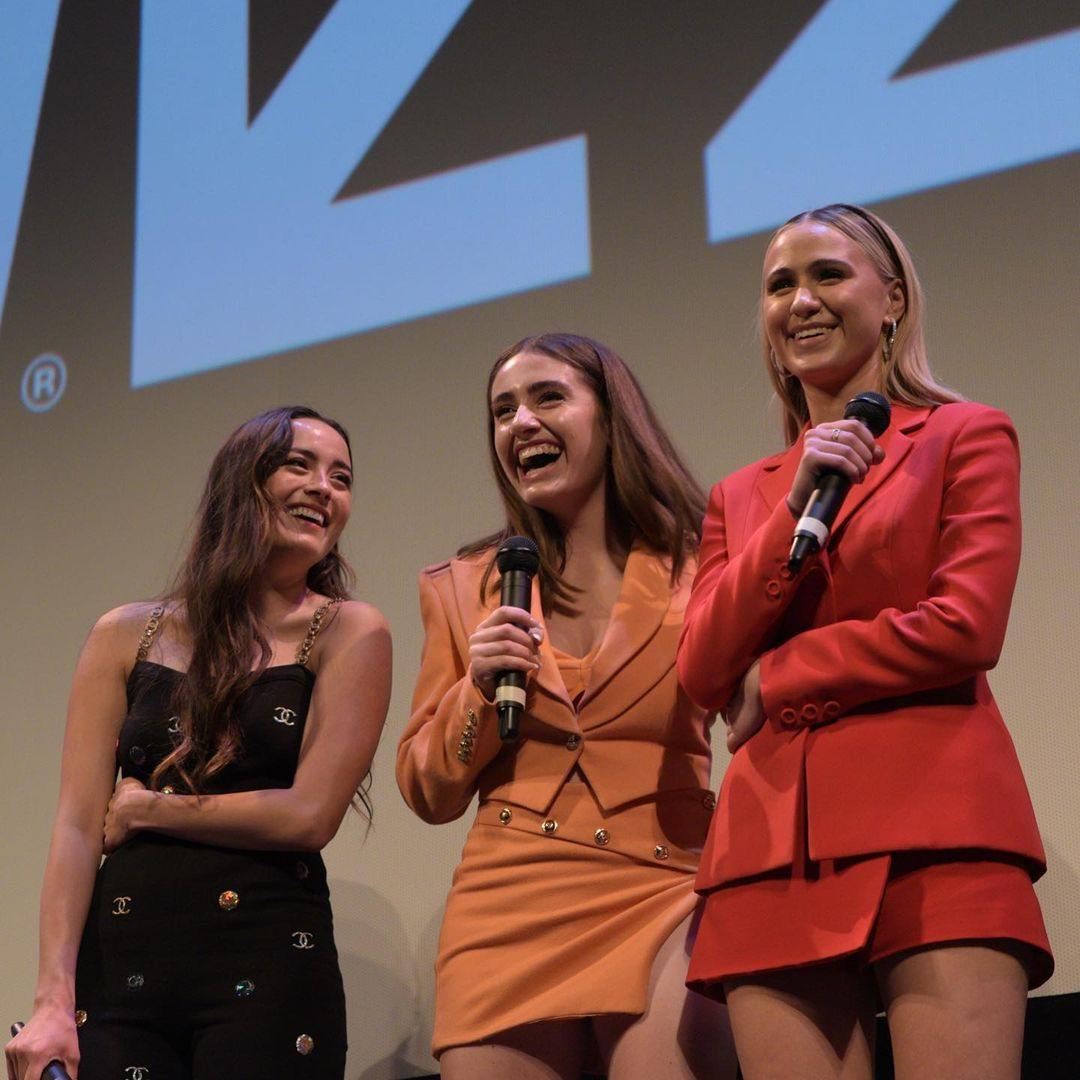
Chase Sui Wonders, Sennott and Maria Bakalova promoting Bodies, Bodies, Bodies (2021)

Sennott starred in the 2020 feature films Tahara as Hannah Rosen, and Shiva Baby as Danielle. Both films are queer Jewish coming-of-age narratives set at funeral services. In the lead role of Danielle in Shiva Baby, which premiered at SXSW and TIFF in 2020, Sennott's performance was highlighted in several reviews, with Andrew Parker of The GATE saying that she gave "a wonderful, star making performance" and Alex de Vore of the Santa Fe Reporter writing that "after her performance in [the film], she should probably just be allowed to do whatever she wants – she's a natural." Sennott won the Rising Star award at the Philadelphia Jewish Film Festival.

In 2022, she played Alice in Bodies Bodies Bodies, an A24 comedy horror film. She was consistently named the standout performance of the film. (Note: Attributed to multiple references:) Megan Conway of The New York Times Style Magazine summarized the consensus surrounding her performance: "Sennott's ability to inject an astonishing range of meaning into Alice's various cries and yowls—as well as her litany of expletives and 'oh my Gods'—steals the show." Sennott next appeared in a supporting role the comedy film Susie Searches (2022) which received mixed reviews.

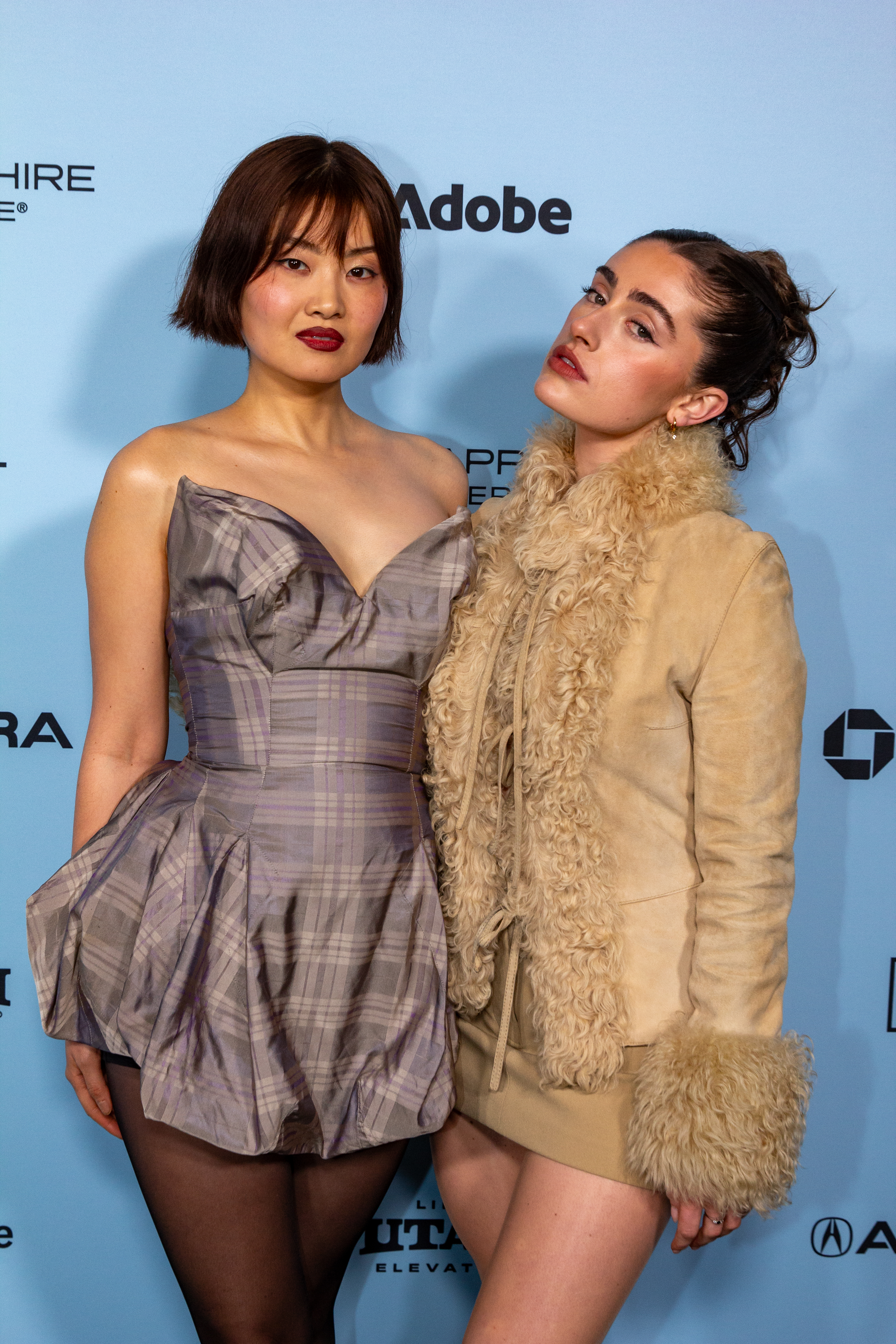
Katarina Zhu and Sennott at Sundance premiere of Bunnylovr in 2025

In 2023, Sennott reunited with Shiva Baby writer-director Emma Seligman to write the teen sex comedy film Bottoms. Sennott stars in the film alongside Ayo Edebiri. The film premiered at SXSW on March 11, 2023, to critical acclaim. She took a starring role in the tragicomedy I Used to Be Funny which was also screened at SXSW. Writing on Sennott's performance in her review for The Austin Chronicle, Jenny Nulf said it "is heartbreaking, a tight rope walk between funny and sad that's done gracefully." Sennott appeared in Saverio Costanzo's period drama Finally Dawn (2023).

Sennott also began starring in a supporting role as a pop star's assistant in the HBO drama series The Idol starring Lily-Rose Depp in June 2023. It premiered at the 76th Cannes Film Festival where it was met with highly unfavorable critical reception, though Alex Barasch of The New Yorker commended Sennott as one of its "strong performances." Sennott appeared in the music video for Charli XCX's single "360", released May 10, 2024.

=== 2025–present: Career expansion ===
On March 18, 2024, Deadline reported that Sennott had sold a half-hour comedy pilot to HBO, in which she is set to write, star, and executive produce. In September of that year, Deadline reported that the project had been ordered to series. On August 26, 2025, Variety reported that the series was titled I Love LA and premiered on HBO on November 2, with episodes airing weekly until the December 21 finale. The series starred Sennott, Odessa A'zion and Josh Hutcherson. The show follows a codependent friend group as they reunite after time spent apart.

In 2025, she co-starred in the Katarina Zhu drama film Bunnylovr, which premiered at the 2025 Sundance Film Festival. In August 2025, Deadline reported that Sennott is set to co-write a biographical film about "Hollywood madam" Heidi Fleiss, in which Aubrey Plaza is attached to star. Sennott appeared alongside Charli XCX in a Super Bowl commercial directed by Aidan Zamiri for soft-beverage brand Poppi during Super Bowl LX in February 2026. The following year she appeared in the mockumentary film The Moment (2026) starring Charli XCX. That same year she co-created the Netflix crime comedy series Big Mistakes starring Levy, Taylor Ortega and Laurie Metcalf. The series received critical acclaim and was renewed for a second season.

== Personal life ==
Sennott splits her time between Los Angeles and New York City.

== Filmography ==
Key
†	Denotes productions that have not yet been released

=== Film ===
Year	Title	Role	Notes	Ref.
2018	Shiva Baby	Danielle	Short film	
2020	Tahara	Hannah Rosen		
2020	Shiva Baby	Danielle	Also executive producer	
2021	Appendage	Ella	Short film	
2022	Bodies Bodies Bodies	Alice		
2022	Susie Searches	Jillian		
2023	Bottoms	PJ	Also screenwriter and executive producer	
2023	I Used to Be Funny	Sam Cowell		
2023	Finally Dawn	Nan Roth		
2024	Saturday Night	Rosie Shuster		
2025	Bunnylovr	Bella	Also producer	
2025	Holland	Candy Deboer	Cameo	
2026	The Moment	Herself		
TBA	Kockroach †	TBA	Post-production	

=== Television ===
Year	Title	Role	Notes	Ref.
2018	High Maintenance	Performer	Episode: "Namaste"	
2020	Ayo and Rachel Are Single	Rachel	3 episodes	
2020	Speak Up	Herself	Episode: "Rachel Sennott and Ayo Edebiri"	
2021	Call Your Mother	Jackie Raines	Main role	
2023	The Idol	Leia	Recurring role	
2023	Teenage Euthanasia	Various voices	2 episodes	
2025–present	I Love LA	Maia	Main cast; also creator, writer, director and executive producer	
2026	Big Mistakes	—N/a	Co-creator alongside Dan Levy, writer	

=== Music videos ===
Year	Title	Artist	Director	Role	Ref.
2024	"360"	Charli XCX	Aidan Zamiri	Herself	

== Awards and nominations ==
Year	Award	Category	Work	Result	Ref.
2020	Philadelphia Jewish Film Festival	Rising Star	Shiva Baby	Won	
2021	Gotham Independent Film Awards	Breakthrough Actor	Shiva Baby	Nominated	
2021	Hollywood Critics Association Midseason Awards	Best Actress	Shiva Baby	Nominated	
2021	The ReFrame Stamp	Narrative Feature	Shiva Baby	Won	
2023	MTV Movie & TV Awards	Best Breakthrough Performance	Bodies Bodies Bodies	Nominated	
2023	MTV Movie & TV Awards	Most Frightened Performance	Bodies Bodies Bodies	Nominated	
2023	Fangoria Chainsaw Awards	Best Supporting Performance	Bodies Bodies Bodies	Nominated	
2024	Independent Spirit Awards	Best Screenplay	Bottoms	Nominated	
2024	Vancouver Film Critics Circle Award	Best Actress in a Canadian Film	I Used to Be Funny	Nominated	
2025	Critics' Choice Movie Awards	Best Acting Ensemble	Saturday Night	Nominated	
2026	Astra TV Awards	Best Actress in a Comedy Series	I Love LA	Nominated	
2026	Astra TV Awards	Best Cable Comedy Ensemble	I Love LA	Nominated	
2026	Gotham TV Awards	Outstanding Lead Performance in a Comedy Series	I Love LA	Nominated	
2026	Gotham TV Awards	Breakthrough Comedy Series	I Love LA	Won	
2026	Gotham TV Awards	Breakthrough Comedy Series	Big Mistakes	Nominated	
