= Emma Seligman =

Canadian film director and screenwriter

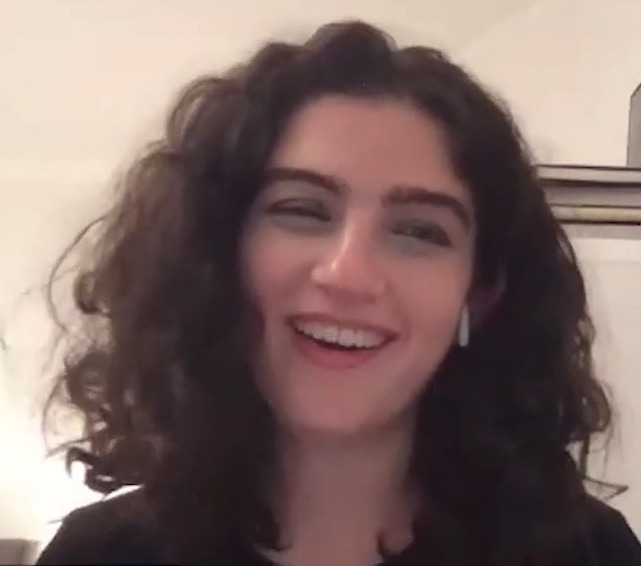
- Seligman in 2020
- Born: May 3, 1995 (age 31); Toronto, Ontario, Canada
- Education: New York University
- Occupations: Screenwriter, Director

Emma Seligman (born May 3, 1995) is a Canadian film director and screenwriter. She (Note: Seligman uses both "she/her" and "they/them" pronouns. This article uses "she/her" pronouns for consistency.) is best known for the films Shiva Baby (2020) and Bottoms (2023).

== Early life and education ==
Seligman was born on May 3, 1995, in Toronto, Ontario, to a Jewish family. She and her sister were the youngest of their generation with a large extended family, so she went to lots of Jewish family functions growing up. She was raised in a Reform Ashkenazi community in Toronto and attended Northern Secondary School there. Her bat mitzvah ceremony was held on Masada in Israel; the party that followed, held in 2008, was filmmaker-themed.

She grew up watching At the Movies with Ebert & Roeper wanting to "be Roger Ebert." As a teenager, Seligman ran a now-defunct blog called Confessions of a Teenage Film Buff and contributed film reviews to The Huffington Post, including a review for Spring Breakers, which she wrote at seventeen years old. During high-school she was a part of TIFF Next Wave, a group of 12 Toronto kids who host a mini film festival each year. In her senior year she directed a one-act play, which helped her realize she wanted to be a director.

She studied film at New York University Tisch School of the Arts, graduating in May 2017. She greatly values the friendships she made while studying there, saying that, "My connections with my peers ended up being so much more vital to my career progressing than connections to any bosses. I had a million internships, and none of them wanted to make my first movie." During her time at NYU Seligman briefly tried out being a sugar baby, going on one date before deciding it wasn't for her. This experience would later inspire her first feature film Shiva Baby. Seligman remained in New York after graduating and interned with the production company Animal Kingdom. She moved to Los Angeles in early 2021.

== Career ==
While at NYU, she made short films including Lonewoods, Void, and her senior thesis film, Shiva Baby. During this time, Seligman also interned at a variety of production studios. She also served on the Toronto International Film Festival's select youth committee, where she helped program films for the festival.

=== Shiva Baby ===
Her thesis short film, Shiva Baby, was selected for 2018 South by Southwest film festival. The film follows Danielle as she attends a Shiva with both her ex-girlfriend and sugar daddy in attendance. During her time at NYU Seligman tried sugaring briefly, and has said of the experience that, "You have this sort of awakening of like, oh my God, I don't have any power in this world, but I do have my sexual power. And I think sugaring has allowed young women and young people to take hold of that to a higher degree."

At the encouragement of the short film's star, Rachel Sennott, whom she befriended during the audition process, Seligman began developing it into a feature, where Sennott would reprise her lead role. It was Sennott's unique style of comedy and knack for uncomfortable humor that transformed Shiva Baby into more of a comedy than the original short film's intense dramedy approach. Seligman also cited inspiration from the horror and thriller genres that helped to form the film's "claustrophobic look." The feature-length version of Shiva Baby was set to premiere at 2020 South by Southwest, but the premiere was cancelled due to the COVID-19 pandemic. Seligman says she finished the feature around half an hour before the festival was cancelled. The film eventually premiered at the 2020 Toronto International Film Festival.

Shiva Baby was met with critical acclaim. Kristy Puchko of The Playlist wrote, "It's astounding this is Seligman's first film, [considering] how masterfully she orchestrates the tension and comedy," and Dana Piccoli for Queer Media Matters praised that "while Seligman is still a relative newcomer to the film world, she handles Shiva Baby like an experienced pro."

In 2022, the film won the John Cassavetes Award from Film Independent, at the time designated for productions with budgets of $500,000 or less. (Note: The criteria for the John Cassavetes Award have since expanded to include films budgeted at $1 million or less.) In an interview with The Upcoming in 2021 after the film's release, Seligman expressed her desire to continue to create complicated female characters and narratives, beyond the confines of being viewed as "messy," just as there are a plethora of complicated male characters on screen who are not given this designation.

=== Bottoms ===
Seligman reunited with Rachel Sennott for her second feature film, Bottoms, a teen sex comedy in which two high school lesbians start a fight club in order to attract their cheerleader crushes. Seligman had the idea for the film while still at NYU, and began working on it with Sennott there. She says she was inspired by her love for teen romantic comedies and sex comedies, while wanting to combine those elements with those of a superhero film or buddy comedy. Bottoms was scored by English singer-songwriter Charli XCX. To promote Bottoms, Seligman appeared on the cover of New York Magazine with the films' stars Rachel Sennott and Ayo Edebiri. The film headlined the SXSW film festival on March 11, 2023.

Aisha Harris of NPR praised the film writing, "Sennott and Seligman strike both a sweet and an abrasive tone that's tricky to pull off, though they do so quite handily." Seligman drew inspiration for the film from a plethora of different movies. From '90s-2000s high-school comedies such as Bring It On, Mean Girls, and But I'm a Cheerleader to '60s and '70s Americana classics like Grease and American Graffiti. Seligman says the setting took inspiration from Ferris Bueller's Day Off, meanwhile the tone and raunchy comedy style came from movies like Superbad and American Pie. The fight club element was inspired by movies like Kick-Ass and Scott Pilgrim vs the World, where the protagonists go on a hero's journey to get the girl.

While working on Bottoms, Seligman found mentorship in Jason Reitman and Elizabeth Banks. They helped her work through the stress of directing such a large production as only her second feature film and at such a young age. Seligman shared that "It was helpful to hear that from people who has so much experience but also hard that all the feelings I was feeling, I could expect to feel forever"

== Styles and themes ==
Shiva Baby explores themes of identity, family pressures, and male validation. Seligman has said that the search for male validation is something she was going through in college when she was in a relationship with a 'fuckboy', the experience giving her material when writing Shiva Baby.

Seligman's work often focuses on sexual themes, particularly women's relationship to sex. Regarding this choice, she has stated:

Women decode sexual messaging from a young age, from eight years old to twenty-two years old. They have to process what sex means, what it can do for them, what it should do for them, what they're supposed to do for it. Technology, for example with porn or dating sites, has made the sexual messaging more confusing, and I'm interested in how women figure it out.

Seligman also focuses on queer themes in her films. Queerness plays a huge part in Bottoms, as both the main characters are lesbians who take on roles typically held by men. She says she feels like queer teens in TV and film are often not allowed to have sexual thoughts the way that straight teen movies talk about sex constantly. Seligman wanted to see more raunchy queer characters on screen, ones who are allowed to be flawed, selfish, and horny.

In Shiva Baby these queer themes are seen through Danielle's ex-girlfriend, Maya. When asked about this queer arc Seligman stated:

"There were certainly friendships I had in high school that could have developed into the kind of relationship that Maya and Danielle had. And by the time I was writing the short I'd come out as queer, and I was thinking about having an ex to play off, who can give the audience a bit of intel about who Danielle is and what she's like on an internal level, and then it was my professor's idea to have the character also be a foil for all the things Danielle isn't in this community, because I also wanted to show the amount of angst that she had about succeeding and being a good kid her parents weren't disappointed in"

She has stated that her filmmaking process as a very collaborative experience, and enjoys being able to discuss her work with her actors.

As Seligman's career continues, she stated that she wants to continue making "weird" queer and Jewish stories on an increasingly larger scale.

== Personal life ==
Seligman uses both "she/her" and "they/them" pronouns, and considers herself to be somewhere on the gender spectrum rather than identifying as trans or nonbinary. She formerly identified as bisexual, but as of 2023 considers herself "just gay". Seligman briefly moved to Los Angeles in 2021, but resides in Bushwick as of 2023.

Despite having a Zionist upbringing, Seligman identifies with anti-zionism and is a member of Jewish Voice for Peace. She has expressed support for Palestinians as well as dismay at the rise of antisemitic violence.

Being Ashkenazi, she is very invested in her Jewish faith and has said if she ever did switch careers she would likely become a rabbi. Her favorite Jewish movies are Yentl, Keeping the Faith, Fiddler on the Roof, Kissing Jessica Stein, Crossing Delancey and A Serious Man. Reflecting on these influences, she has stated, "Looking back, I don't know how my Jewish film journey, how Shiva Baby, would have come about without those movies, or what it would have been like without them laying the groundwork."

== Filmography ==
Film work by Emma Seligman
Year	Title	Notes
2018	Void	Short film
2018	Shiva Baby	Short film
2020	Shiva Baby	Feature adaptation of 2018 short
2023	Bottoms	Feature film

== Awards and nominations ==
(Note: With Rachel Sennott for Bottoms.) (Note: With Rachel Sennott for Bottoms.)

Year	Association	Category	Work	Result	Ref(s).
2018	South by Southwest	Best Narrative Short	Shiva Baby	Nominated	
2020	Denver Film Festival	American Independent Award	Shiva Baby	Special mention: New Comedic Voice	
2020	Filmmaker Magazine	25 New Faces of Indie Film 2020	Shiva Baby	Listed	
2020	Miami International Film Festival	Jordan Ressler First Feature Award	Shiva Baby	Nominated	
2020	Outfest	Best Screenwriting	Shiva Baby	Won	
2020	Out on Film	Best First Film	Shiva Baby	Runner-up	
2020	TIFF Critics Poll	Best Screenplay	Shiva Baby	Runner-up	
2020	Variety; Presented at the Mill Valley Film Festival	10 Screenwriters to Watch	Shiva Baby	Listed	
2021	The Braddies	Best Debut	Shiva Baby	Listed	
2021	Chicago Film Critics Association	Milos Stehlik Breakthrough Filmmaker Award	Shiva Baby	Nominated	
2021	Detroit Film Critics Society	Breakthrough	Shiva Baby	Won (Note: Shared with Woody Norman for C'mon C'mon.)	
2021	Florida Film Critics Circle Awards	Best First Film	Shiva Baby	Nominated	
2021	Gotham Independent Film Awards	Bingham Ray Breakthrough Director Award	Shiva Baby	Nominated	
2021	Hollywood Critics Association Midseason Awards	Best Filmmaker	Shiva Baby	Nominated	
2021	Hollywood Critics Association Midseason Awards	Best Screenplay	Shiva Baby	Nominated	
2021	IndieWire Critics Poll	Best First Feature	Shiva Baby	Fourth	
2021	The Jewish Week	36 Under 36	Shiva Baby	Listed	
2021	The New York Times	Best Directing (Comedy)	Shiva Baby	Won	
2021	The ReFrame Stamp	Narrative Feature	Shiva Baby	Listed	
2022	Apolo Awards	Best New Director	Shiva Baby	Nominated	
2022	Apolo Awards	Best Adapted Screenplay	Shiva Baby	Won	
2022	Austin Film Critics Association	Best First Film	Shiva Baby	Nominated	
2022	Chlotrudis Society for Independent Films	Best Original Screenplay	Shiva Baby	Nominated	
2022	Directors Guild of America Awards	Outstanding Directing – First-Time Feature Film	Shiva Baby	Nominated	
2022	DiscussingFilm Critics Awards	Best Debut Feature	Shiva Baby	Nominated	
2022	Independent Spirit Awards	John Cassavetes Award	Shiva Baby	Won (Note: With Kieran Altmann, Katie Schiller and Lizzie Shapiro for Shiva Baby.)	
2022	Online Film Critics Society Awards	Best Debut Feature	Shiva Baby	Nominated	
2022	Toronto Film Critics Association	Best First Feature	Shiva Baby	Runner-up (Note: Shared with Passing and Pig.)	
2023	Indiana Film Journalists Association	Best Original Screenplay	Bottoms	Nominated (Note: With Rachel Sennott for Bottoms.)	
2023	Sidewalk Film Festival	Sidewalk Programmer's Feature Film Award	Bottoms	Won	
2023	SXSW	Headliners	Bottoms	Nominated	
2024	Independent Spirit Awards	Best Screenplay	Bottoms	Nominated (Note: With Rachel Sennott for Bottoms.)	
2024	Dorian Film Awards	Campy Flick of the Year	Bottoms	Nominated	
2024	Dorian Film Awards	LGBT Screenplay of the Year	Bottoms	Nominated	
2024	Critics Choice Awards	Best Comedy	Bottoms	Nominated	
2024	GLAAD Media Awards	Outstanding Film - Wide Theatrical Release	Bottoms	Won	

== See also ==
- List of female film and television directors
- List of LGBT-related films directed by women

== Works cited ==
- Jacobs, Matthew (April 6, 2021). "Meet the Young Queer Director Behind Shiva Baby". The Cut.
- Rizov, Vadim (October 19, 2020). "Emma Seligman | Filmmaker Magazine". Filmmaker Magazine | Publication with a focus on independent film, offering articles, links, and resources.
- Raup, Jordan (April 12, 2022). "Shiva Baby Director Emma Seligman Sets Cast for Bottoms". The Film Stage.
- Wilner, Norman (October 20, 2020). "Emma Seligman delivers Shiva Baby to the Toronto Jewish Film Festival". NOW Magazine. Archived from the original on October 23, 2020.
- Mitchell, Elvis (July 26, 2024). "'Bottoms' director Emma Seligman on nailing the queer high school comedy's tone". KCRW. Retrieved November 23, 2025.
