= The Chair Company =

American television series

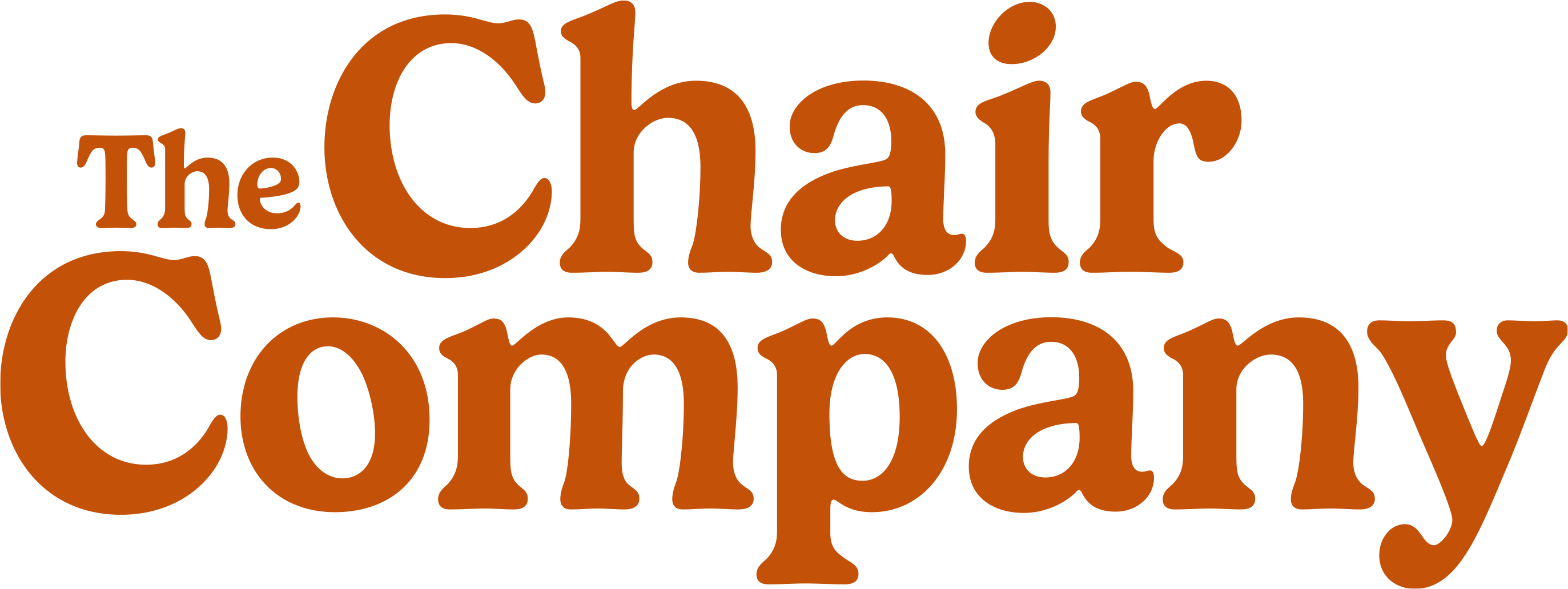
- Genre: Cringe comedy; Thriller; Mystery
- Created by: Tim Robinson; Zach Kanin
- Directed by: Andrew DeYoung; Aaron Schimberg
- Starring: Tim Robinson; Lake Bell; Sophia Lillis; Will Price; Joseph Tudisco
- Music by: Keegan DeWitt
- Country of origin: United States
- Original language: English
- No. of seasons: 1
- No. of episodes: 8

Production
- Executive producers: Tim Robinson; Zach Kanin; Andrew DeYoung; Adam McKay; Todd Schulman; Igor Srubshchik
- Production location: New York City
- Running time: 26–36 minutes
- Production companies: Hyperobject Industries; Zanin Corp; HBO Entertainment

Original release
- Network: HBO
- Release: October 12, 2025 – present

The Chair Company is an American cringe comedy mystery television series created by Tim Robinson and Zach Kanin for HBO. The first season premiered on October 12, 2025, and aired weekly through November 30, 2025. The series has been renewed for a second season.

The Chair Company follows Ron Trosper, a man who has an embarrassing workplace incident involving a faulty chair; this incident leads him to investigate a far-reaching conspiracy involving the chair company, while also creating tension within his workplace. The cast includes Tim Robinson, Lake Bell, Sophia Lillis, Will Price and Joseph Tudisco. The series is a collaboration between Robinson and Kanin, who previously met as writers on Saturday Night Live before co-creating the comedy series Detroiters and I Think You Should Leave with Tim Robinson. Among the executive producers for The Chair Company are Adam McKay and Andrew DeYoung, the latter of whom directed several episodes including the premiere, and also previously directed Robinson in the dark comedy film Friendship (2024).

The Chair Company received widespread acclaim from critics, with some calling it one of the best shows of the year. Reviewers praised its inventive blend of cringe comedy and surreal mystery, singling out Robinson's performance and the show's offbeat tone, a style some noted may not appeal to all audiences. The series premiered to 1.4 million viewers across HBO platforms, the network's biggest comedy debut in over five years and one of the top three HBO Max comedy launches in the platform's history.

== Premise ==
The Chair Company tells the story of William Ronald Trosper, who investigates a vast and elaborate conspiracy after an embarrassing workplace incident.

== Cast ==
=== Main ===
- Tim Robinson as William Ronald "Ron" Trosper, a recently promoted project manager at the property development firm Fisher Robay, who becomes obsessed with uncovering an apparent conspiracy involving a chair manufacturing company
- Lake Bell as Barb Trosper, Ron's wife
- Sophia Lillis as Natalie Trosper, Ron's engaged daughter
- Will Price as Seth Trosper, Ron's teenage son
- Joseph Tudisco as Mike Santini, a restaurant security guard who teams up with Ron to investigate the chair company

=== Recurring ===
- Lou Diamond Phillips as Jeff Levjman, the CEO of Fisher Robay
- James Downey as Douglas, Ron's eccentric coworker
- Gary Richardson as Alon, Ron's coworker
- Zuleyma Guevara as Brenda, Ron's boss
- Glo Tavarez as Jamie, Ron's assistant
- Grace Reiter as Tara, Natalie's fiancée
- Zach Kanin as Victor, one of Ron's coworkers
- Amelia Campbell as Amanda, one of Ron's coworkers
- Bardia Salimi as Steven Droyco
- Conner O'Malley and Andrew Fitzgerald as the voices of Pepperoni and Lice, two hosts of a vulgar podcast
- Joseph Lymous as George, Barb's business partner
- Jared Lindner as Tamblay Store Owner

=== Guest ===
- Alberto Isaac as Oliver Probblo, an actor connected to the conspiracy
- Ted Arcidi as Building Super, an unstable man Ron encounters
- Ken Jacowitz as Tamblay Customer
- Victor E. Chan as Video Customer
- Peter Reznikoff as Stacy Crystals

== Episodes ==
No.	Title	Directed by	Written by	Original release date	U.S. viewers (millions)
1	"Life goes by too f**king fast, it really does."	Andrew DeYoung	Tim Robinson & Zach Kanin	October 12, 2025	0.124
Ron Trosper works for Fisher Robay, a property development firm, and is promoted to lead their latest shopping mall project. After giving a company-wide presentation, he sits down but his chair promptly collapses on stage. He calls the chair manufacturer, Tecca, but finds that its phone line is handled by a call center that is unable to help. After locating the company's address nearby, he breaks in and finds an empty warehouse containing only a photocopier with copies of pornographic material (which he snaps pictures of with his phone) and also a large red ball. He escapes after realizing he is not alone in the building. His obsession over the faulty chair leads to several mistakes and embarrassing incidents at work. Leaving his office at night, he is assaulted by a man who warns him to forget about the chair company. Ron chases the man and is left holding his shirt.
2	"New blood. There's 5 Rons now."	Andrew DeYoung	Tim Robinson & Zach Kanin	October 19, 2025	N/A
Ron's daughter Natalie asks him for help convincing her fiancée's family to agree to change their wedding venue. On the way to a site visit for the mall, he decides to detour to Tamblay's, the store selling his attacker's brand of shirt, causing the co-worker following him to almost have an accident. Ron joins the Tamblay's members club in hopes of tracking down the shirt owner. The store clerk points out some dirt on the shirt, which leads Ron to deduce his attacker's hiding spot in the company parking lot. A discarded food container leads him to a cafe where his attacker works as a security guard. After a brief tussle, the guard, Mike Santini, proposes that Ron hire him to help find the man that originally hired him to attack Ron. Later that night on the way to the man's location, Mike tries to give Ron a handgun. Ron backs out of the arrangement to get home in time for a game night with Natalie's fiancée's parents. During the game night, he is sent a text from an unknown number, revealing a picture of him taken at that exact moment, apparently from a nearby closet with a door ajar.
3	"@BrownDerbyHistoricVids Little bit of Hollywood? Okayyy."	Andrew DeYoung	Gary Richardson	October 26, 2025	N/A
Ron opens the closet door to find a little person, whom he chases outside. Mike arrives at the scene and says the man works for him, and reveals he found out that the man who hired him to scare Ron had been paid $50,000 for the job by someone else. Ron visits the county office to look up the deed of the abandoned Tecca warehouse and finds out who the owner is, as well as the last person to ask about the deed. Looking at the company's website, he sees pictures of the board members in front of the red ball in the warehouse; however, the board members don't seem to exist in real life. Ron and Mike track down Steven Droyco, the man who inquired about the deed; upon questioning him, he becomes agitated and drives off. They break into his house to search for evidence, discovering his elderly and senile mother, and escape with piles of papers. Later, Droyco shows up at Ron's office, demanding his papers back. Alerted by his security system, Ron sees an office chair outside his house, upon which a person wearing a Jason Voorhees mask sits down and stares at the camera.
4	"Bahld Harmon birthplace (disputed)"	Aaron Schimberg	Sarah Schneider	November 2, 2025	N/A
In a flashback, Ron and his wife Barb talk about quitting their jobs to follow their own dreams. In the present, Ron finds out someone has been using his identity to sell items online (causing the buyers to show up at his house), apply for modeling agencies, and donate his backyard grill to the police department. Mike sends a friend to pose as an exterminator as an excuse for Ron to move his family out of the house and stay with his daughter Natalie and her fiancée. After his boss Jeff confronts him about an email supposedly from him asking for a raise, Ron receives an emailed customer survey from Tecca, the last question being "Are we done, Ron?" Mike steals a chair from the office so Ron can take it apart and investigate. Ron tells Natalie about the conspiracy and his suspicion that Tecca is using chairs to smuggle drugs into the country, hiding them where a missing part should be. She appears supportive, telling him she loves and trusts him. In another flashback from years earlier, Barb and Natalie secretly observe Ron struggling with his failing Jeep tour business. Barb tells Natalie that he will come out of it, and that all they can do is to tell him that they love and trust him.
5	"I won. Zoom in."	Aaron Schimberg	John Solomon	November 9, 2025	0.144
Ron and Mike meet up with Steven Droyco, who claims to have seen the CFO from Tecca's website, Ken Tucker. This seems to be a dead end when it turns out the man pictured as the CFO is merely the same actor used for a video game. Mike finds out the actor's name, Oliver Probblo, from the game credits, and they meet him in a bar to question him. He claims the Red Ball Market Global (RBMG) photoshoot was pitched as an acting exercise where they were instructed to play the parts of business executives. All three men get into conflicts with bar patrons, and they escape to Oliver's house where he has the photoshoot director's emails on his iPad. The bar patrons track down Oliver's address from the ID he left behind, show up at his apartment and begin to violently attack everyone. Ron is knocked out and is later given a ride home from the hospital by Mike, who stops on the way to unsuccessfully attempt to talk to his daughter, Lynette. Mike declares that he and Ron are family, and he will help Ron without needing further payments.
6	"Happy Birthday, a friend."	Andrew DeYoung	Marika Sawyer	November 16, 2025	N/A
Ron visits the acting class where Oliver's photo shoot took place. When Ron questions one of the class members, he quickly runs outside, where Ron tries to take pictures of him. Jeff comes back from a retreat in Sedona, and decides the entire mall project must be redesigned. Mike has Ron meet with his exterminator, who says he found bugs in Ron's house that originated from Hungary, and were also found at one other job location, the Delaware City government building. Ron discovers that the same four-color pattern tattooed on the arm of the man from the acting class was used on Delaware City's website, as well as the RBMG website. The next day, Ron kicks Mike out from entering a birthday party for his son, Seth. Seth, having been told off by an agitated Ron, drinks copious amounts of alcohol, causing him to puke in front of the guests. Barb expresses disappointment towards Ron, who previously told her he’d handle Seth’s secret drinking problem. On Sunday, Jeff takes everyone from the office to the mall site to get inspiration on redesigning it, where they discover trespassers operating a track for miniature remote controlled Jeeps. During an argument with the trespassers, Ron accidentally shoves Jeff. He leaves to go investigate the Delaware City building which is open that day, without staff, due to a nearby fair. A police officer catches him inside, chasing him through the building, where he discovers a large room filled wall to wall with Tecca chairs.
7	"I said to my dog, "How do you like my hippie shirt?""	Andrew DeYoung	John Solomon	November 23, 2025	N/A
Ron, suspended from work for pushing Jeff, brings home a new dog and tries to reach the Delaware City purchasing director, Teresa Bonaventura, who has long been absent. After learning from his exterminator's partner where similar bugs have appeared, Ron stakes out a site, sees workers loading chairs into a truck, and follows it to the Tecca warehouse. Ron spots a complaint in the Tamblay membership group chat about a blemished shirt that was resold with decorative patches, leading him to theorize that Tecca refurbishes old chairs and sells them as new. He shares this with Natalie, who has found Teresa's address; Ron visits her and discovers she is sick and hasn't worked in years. That night, at a party hosted by Alice Quintana, a major investor in Barb's company, Ron finds a photo of Alice with Teresa. Oliver Probblo then calls with the name of the woman who took Ron's photos: Alice. Ron is attacked by the acting-class man before Alice intervenes, revealing the attacker is her nephew and that she is funding Barb's company using money she embezzled through Tecca. Ron threatens to expose her, but learns from Barb's friend that Barb knows about his investigation and is proud. Ron dances with Barb, sees his reflection, and fights back tears.
8	"Minnie Mouse coming back wasn't on my bingo card."	Aaron Schimberg	Tim Robinson & Zach Kanin	November 30, 2025	N/A
A young boy fatally shoots Hollywood producer Stacy Crystals with a 3D-printed gun, accusing him of ruining his father's life. While Ron is suspended from work, he reconnects with his family. In an HR meeting, Jeff feels humiliated by discussion of Ron overpowering him and invites Ron for drinks to smooth things over. Mike visits Ron and becomes angry when Ron says the investigation is over. Ron tries to help Mike reconnect with his daughter, Lynette, but is turned away. While chasing the family's new dog, Ron discovers she has returned to her former owner's house. At a karaoke bar with Jeff, Ron hears one of Jeff's original songs and recognizes the melody and voice from RBMG's hold music. He rushes to Jeff's office and finds a hidden compartment containing paperwork identifying Jeff and Stacy Crystals as the real owners of RBMG. Back home, Lynette explains that her biological father died and donated his heart to Mike, and that Mike's obsessive behavior after being invited to walk her down the aisle led to a restraining order. Ron then receives another call directing him to his high school gym, where the masked man from his security footage reveals that all recent events stem from a humiliating high-school incident involving Ron's colleague Amanda and claims she caused Ron's chair collapse using telekinesis. The man says he is Amanda's boyfriend and attacks Ron.

== Production ==
=== Development ===
"With an imprint only Tim and Zach can have on a character, William Ronald Trosper follows in the strong tradition of HBO comedy leads. I couldn't be happier to announce the pickup of this wildly enjoyable show."

— Amy Gravitt, Executive Vice President, HBO & Max Comedy Programming

The series was created by Tim Robinson and Zach Kanin, who also serve as writers and executive producers. Robinson and Kanin are long-time collaborators, having met as writers on the sketch comedy series Saturday Night Live before co-creating together the comedy shows Detroiters (2017–2018) and I Think You Should Leave with Tim Robinson (2019–2023). Robinson claimed the creative process behind The Chair Company was unstructured, saying they were not trying to design it to follow a particular format or consciously mirror their past work: "None of this is thought out. It's not planned. It's not on purpose."

Adam McKay and Todd Schulman are also executive producers through their company Hyperobject Industries, with Andrew DeYoung and Igor Srubshchik executive producing as well. DeYoung, who directed the Robinson-starring dark comedy film Friendship (2024), also directed several episodes of The Chair Company, including the pilot.

Deadline Hollywood first announced on April 2, 2024, that HBO green-lit a pilot for The Chair Company. The publication described it as part of a trend by HBO to develop more creator-actor comedy series following the conclusion of two of its signature shows, Barry and Curb Your Enthusiasm.

On November 20, 2025, HBO renewed the series for a second season.

=== Casting ===
Robinson plays the lead role of Ron Trosper. After the show's official trailer was released, some commentators compared the character to Craig Waterman, whom Robinson had played in the film Friendship. Robinson acknowledged the similarity, but said Ron could be less off-putting to those averse to cringe comedy: "I actually don't think Ron is as tough of a hang as Craig Waterman is. I think Ron is a prideful man, and like a lot of characters that Zach and I have worked on, doesn't like to be embarrassed ... This time, maybe he found something he can actually do." On July 22, 2024, Variety reported that The Chair Company had added main cast members Lake Bell, Sophia Lillis, Will Price, and Joseph Tudisco, along with recurring guest star Lou Diamond Phillips.

Robinson and Kanin specifically sought out Jim Downey, the longest tenured writer in Saturday Night Live history, for the supporting role of Douglas. Robinson previously worked with Downey on SNL, where Downey wrote the first sketch that featured Robinson. Later, Downey watched I Think You Should Leave with Tim Robinson at his son's suggestion, and Downey thought it was "just genius." Robinson and Kanin emailed Downey to offer him the role of Douglas, which he immediately accepted, without realizing it was a recurring part beyond the pilot episode. Downey filmed his scenes for the pilot shortly after having completed his acting role in the Paul Thomas Anderson film One Battle After Another (2025).

Beyond the main cast, many supporting roles were filled by relatively unknown actors, an intentional choice to add an element of realism to the series. DeYoung said of this, "There's an excitement when you don't have the baggage of somebody that you know." The supporting cast members who portrayed the Fisher Robay office staff created a group chat after filming the pilot, staying in touch from July 2024 into the following year while awaiting word on the show's renewal and their potential return. Pangborn said when production resumed, "it was like coming back to college and seeing your friends again."

The Chair Company features several former collaborators from Robinson's and Kanin's I Think You Should Leave with Tim Robinson, including Alberto Isaac.

=== Costume design ===
Nicky Smith, costume designer for The Chair Company, worked closely with Robinson and Kanin to develop Ron Trosper's look. Smith originally pitched the concept as "middle-management hodgepodge," and the team tested several options, including a modern tech-industry aesthetic featuring items such as fleece vests and minimalist sneakers, which they ultimately discarded as too contemporary for a character like Ron. The final design emphasized Ron as a traditionalist corporate professional whose wardrobe reflects a style rooted in the early 2000s.

To convey a sense of corporate monotony and disarray, Robinson was dressed in intentionally ill-fitting garments such as oversized jackets, drooping ties, and pleated khakis. Smith said the goal was to make Ron appear slightly overwhelmed by his own clothing. Other characters' wardrobes were similarly designed to reflect everyday realism. Barb Trosper's wardrobe reflected understated suburban practicality and a dated sense of taste, featuring patterned silk blouses with retro floral prints, long cardigans, and well-worn slip-on shoes. Mike Santini's appearance was conceived to contrast with the polished archetype of organized crime figures, with plain leather jackets, square-toe sneakers, and dated casualwear rather than tailored suits or luxury accessories.

To achieve the show's overall aesthetic, Smith and her team purchased wardrobe pieces from secondhand stores such as Goodwill and The Salvation Army, as well as from a wardrobe sale for the television series Blue Bloods. They purchased shoes and vintage blazers from brands including Penguin, Brooks Brothers, Hickey Freeman, and Bloomingdale's in-house label.

Joshua R. Pangborn, who plays office worker Cal, spoke highly of the production's fat-positive wardrobe department. Describing himself as one of two "performers of size" among the show's recurring cast, Pangborn said the wardrobe department accommodated his requests for more comfortable attire and emphasized that there was "nothing to apologize for" regarding his body. He credited the wardrobe team and HBO's overall set culture with helping him feel "safe, supported, and seen."

=== Filming ===
Cinematographer Ashley Connor served as Director of Photography for The Chair Company. Although set in Ohio, none of the series was filmed there. It was largely shot in New York City, with the pilot episode being filmed around May 2024, and the remaining episodes being shot between May and July 2025. Some interior scenes, including those set in the Trosper household and the Fisher Robay office, were filmed at Broadway Stages in Brooklyn, primarily at Soundstage 23, a 17,000-square-foot facility designed for large-scale set construction and soundproof dialogue recording. The stage also included adjacent office and wardrobe areas, along with on-site lighting and equipment rentals provided by Luna Lighting, Inc. Exterior shots were filmed in various locations in Manhattan, among other places.

Scenes from the second and seventh episode set at the Tamblay's clothing store were filmed at Suit Man, a family-owned men's formal-wear shop located at 17 Gramatan Avenue in Mount Vernon, New York. The store is co-owned by Jared Lindner, who also played the Tamblay Store Owner. Upon meeting him during a location scout, Tim Robinson was so impressed by Lindner and his distinctive manner of speaking that he offered him the role. Episode director Andrew DeYoung supported the casting immediately, and HBO approved it after Lindner participated in a script reading. Despite having no acting experience, Lindner said the team made him feel entirely at ease during production, adding, "It's unbelievable how good they are."

The writing process for The Chair Company was described as highly fluid, with Robinson and Kanin frequently rewriting scenes and encouraging multiple variations during filming, influenced by their past work together on Saturday Night Live. As a result, actors often performed the same scene in many different ways without knowing how it would ultimately be cut, creating what was characterized as both a challenging and rewarding experience. Lou Diamond Phillips said while the approach differed from what he was accustomed to, he found it "incredibly gratifying", adding: "You just have to be so fluid. You just have to roll with it. And that's a wonderful tight rope to walk." The Guardian's Jack Seale compared DeYoung's direction to that of 1970s paranoid thriller films.

=== Music ===
The original score for The Chair Company was composed by Keegan DeWitt, a film and television composer best known as the co-founder and lead vocalist of the indie pop band Wild Cub. It marked his second collaboration with Tim Robinson and Andrew DeYoung, following his work on their film Friendship. Vulture's Ben Rosenstock described DeWitt's music for The Chair Company as a "cool, slightly eerie score," with a "bass-y drum machine" sound. Erik Adams of The A.V. Club described the score as "paranoid electronic burbles" that contrasts sharply with some of the easygoing 1970s rock songs featured in the series. In addition to DeWitt's compositions, the series featured a number of licensed songs. One particularly notable example is Jim Croce's "I Got a Name", which plays as Ron tearfully looks through photos of his children in the series premiere.

== Release ==
HBO and Warner Bros. Discovery formally announced the series order in a press release on September 12, 2024. Footage from The Chair Company was featured in a two-minute teaser HBO released on November 10, 2024, highlighting its upcoming programming for 2025. On September 8, it was announced the show would debut on October 12, 2025, with a total of eight episodes released weekly until the season finale on November 30. New still photos from the series were also released. The official two-minute trailer was released on September 18, 2025. The A.V. Club writer Mary Kate Carr called it "quintessential Tim Robinson — that is to say, funny but also kind of unsettling, straddling the line between silly and serious". Hershal Pandya of Vulture said called it "a display of perfect Robinson facial expressions and line deliveries." Ahead of the show's release, Andy Murray of Tom's Guide wrote: "the buzz is high in U.S. circles, which is impressive given The Chair Company's indie nature and offbeat stylings. It's definitely one to watch out for."

Robinson and Kanin said they deliberately tried to release as little as possible about the series. Kanin said: "When I watch a show or a movie, I don't want to know anything about it. I would want to just be surprised by everything." The first seven episodes of The Chair Company were provided to reviewers in advance of the show's debut, but the season finale was withheld, and critics were asked not report specific details about Ron Trosper's workplace accident in the series premiere. Slate's Sam Adams said the request came "not just once, but numerous times, in bold and underlined type." Writers were also asked not to reveal anything about Joseph Tudisco's character Mike Santini. IndieWire's Ben Travers wrote of this: "Usually when a network claims a show's premise is also a spoiler, it's an annoying overreaction. But in this case it makes sense. They're protecting a damn good joke." Adams wrote that it "seems like an absurd request" because the workplace incident itself is fairly innocuous, but that it feels appropriate because "while the chair incident might not seem like much to anyone else, it's a very, very big deal to Ron Trosper."

The series premiere, "Life goes by too f**king fast, it really does.", debuted on October 12, 2025, airing on HBO and streaming on Max in the United States, with a simultaneous release in Canada on Crave. The episode became available the following day in the United Kingdom on Sky Comedy and in Australia on HBO Max Australia.

In November 2025 the show was renewed for a second season at HBO.

== Reception ==
=== Critical response ===
The Chair Company received acclaim from critics upon release. On the review aggregator Rotten Tomatoes, 100% of 53 critic reviews are positive. The website's critical consensus reads, "Tim Robinson's volcanic comedic ethos finds an ideal outlet in The Chair Company, a descent into paranoia that finds huge laughs in deeply uncomfortable places." Metacritic assigned a weighted average score of 82 out of 100 based on 26 reviews, indicating "universal acclaim". Tyler Doster of AwardsWatch called it "one of the best shows of the year," while TV Guide writer Allison Picurro described it as "by far the funniest show of the year," and JoBlo's Alex Maidy said it "could be the weirdest series to air on HBO in a very long time." Sahiba Tahleel of Soap Central wrote that The Chair Company "has been recognized as the most daring and harmonious of all Robinson's creations."

Several critics remarked that the series successfully translates Tim Robinson's signature cringe-comedy style into a serialized format. Many noted similarities between The Chair Company and I Think You Should Leave with Tim Robinson, particularly in how characters attempt to rationalize an embarrassing situation, only to make it worse. Although Ron Trosper shares many traits with other characters Robinson has played, many critics described Ron as more grounded and relatable, making viewers root for him to succeed.

Reviewers praised the show's blend of cringe comedy with elements of other genres like mystery, thriller, and horror, noting that Robinson's and DeYoung's film Friendship struck a similar balance between absurdity and unease. Sarah Moran of Screen Rant called the series a "delightful combination" of conspiratorial thriller and cringe comedy, noting that she was surprised to also find it heartwarming and a compelling mystery. IGN writer Alex Zalben described it as "laugh-out-loud funny," while also adding that "scenes of weird scares manage to eke out both the tension inherent in your favorite scary movie as well as copious laughs."

Josh Rosenberg of Esquire said "there is nothing else like The Chair Company on TV today", calling it "a bold and unprecedented feat of cringe comedy" that balances eccentricity and restraint better than Robinson's earlier film Friendship. Decider's Meghan O'Keefe called the series "a strange, sensitive work of art that once again establishes co-creators and long-time collaborators Tim Robinson and Zach Kanin as the evil comic geniuses of their generation." The Daily Beast critic Nick Schager called it "one of the year's most bonkers comedies," adding: "rarely has a series generated so many laughs from situations that, at first glance, aren't explicitly funny." TV Insider writer Matt Roush described it as an "aggressively weird farce," writing: "If it hurts when you cringe, this bizarre dark comedy might just be the most painful comedy you'll watch all year."

Critics noted that Ron's unraveling reflects broader anxieties of digital culture, with his obsessive investigation and growing mistrust echoing the isolating feedback loops of online life and the misinformation age. Several reviewers compared the show's surreal, otherworldly tone to the work of filmmaker David Lynch. Variety's Alison Herman said The Chair Company has a Lynchian ability to "coax out the sinister undertones of everyday settings," while IndieWire's Ben Travers compared its "dreamlike quality" to Lynch's television series Twin Peaks. Slate's Sam Adams called it "less Office Space, more Mulholland Drive." Nicholas Quah of Vulture wrote that, "like Lynch, Robinson's onscreen world hums with quiet dread, a sense that something sinister lurks just beneath the veil of the everyday banal."

Many reviewers described The Chair Company as one of the year's strangest and most original comedies. TheWrap writer Chase Hutchinson called it Robinson's "most bonkers, brilliant work yet," successfully combining comedic chaos with emotional depth. Quah described it as an ambitious, surreal expansion of Robinson's comedic world that succeeds as a darkly funny exploration of obsessive male anxiety. Ross Bonaime of Collider called it "one of the most offbeat and outlandish shows you'll see this year" praising its ability to sustain Robinson's "uncomfortable, absurd, and downright weird comedy" across a full season, though he noted that the joke density is lower than in I Think You Should Leave or Detroiters. Brian Tallerico of RogerEbert.com described it as "captivatingly strange piece of work, a show that feels like it reaches for commentary in a way that these guys haven't really done before."

Tim Robinson received widespread acclaim for his performance as Ron Trosper, with several critics calling it his best work to date. Hutchinson praised Robinson's expressive physicality, comparing it to the work of Jim Carrey, while Moran called his performance the key element that makes The Chair Company so convincing. Calling the performance "top form," Doster highlighted Robinson's ability to transition from manic comedy to tender family moments, particularly in scenes with co-star Sophia Lillis. In a less complimentary assessment of Robinson's performance, Erik Adams of The A.V. Club wrote, "There's not a ton he's showing us in the premiere that he hasn't shown us elsewhere; it's the packaging and the storytelling real estate that's different."

Joseph Tudisco also earned particular praise for his portrayal of Mike Santini. /Film's Chris Evangelista called it a "breakout role," while Moran said his character "may actually be the heart and soul of the whole show," adding that "the pathos Tudisco brings is heartbreaking." Bonaime described Tudisco as a "fantastic standout" who plays off Robinson well, and Zalben called him "the likely break-out star of the season," noting his "stilted delivery and oddball character quirks" give way to a "sweet soul." Rosenberg described the part "the role of a lifetime," describing Tudisco's character as "a runaway train every time he's onscreen."

Several critics also described Downey's performance as Douglas as a "standout" in The Chair Company cast.

While the series was widely praised, some critics acknowledged that Robinson's and Kanin's unique brand of humor may not appeal to all audiences, noting that The Chair Company was unlikely to win new converts but would strongly resonate with existing fans. Quah wrote that the show's rhythms "are tuned to a very specific frequency of discomfort that not everyone will find funny or even watchable," but that for "card-carrying sloppy-steak aficionados, it's a rich text." Zalben similarly observed that "even Robinson's admirers would likely agree his humor isn't for everyone," while Evangelista wrote that viewers who dislike Robinson's style "won't find anything new in The Chair Company to grab hold of," but that it will send existing fans "into near-hysterics." The Hollywood Reporter writer Angie Han said the show's "cringing mortifications and unsettling unreality" make it a "tough sit," but said the same qualities that make it challenging also make it "irresistible" to fans. Roush wrote: "Whether you're tickled may depend on your appreciation for the gonzo sensibility of Tim Robinson, a manic maestro of slapstick apoplexy."

A few critics offered more mixed appraisals. The Boston Globe writer Chris Vognar described The Chair Company as a chaotic series lacking narrative cohesion or lasting storytelling power, and felt it was too fringe to be massively popular, though he added, "I'm glad there's a high-profile place for it in the TV ecosystem." Time's Judy Berman praised the show's humor and Robinson's character, but felt the mystery subplot failed to generate suspense and suggested Robinson's style "may not be best suited to longform narrative." The New York Times television critic James Poniewozik wrote that the show doesn't entirely deliver on its approach and often feels like a series of extended I Think You Should Leave sketches, but added: "Still, I was drawn in, wondering what strange, sleazy alley this shaggy dog would lead me down next." Los Angeles Times television reviewer Robert Lloyd complimented Robinson's performance, but cautioned that "it takes a certain sort of stamina, or a love for, this particular brand of chaos to put up with him," calling his antics so extreme that "it can be off-putting, and drowns out the human inside."

=== Accolades ===
Year	Award	Category	Recipient(s)	Result	Ref.
2026	ACE Eddie Awards	Best Edited Single-Camera Comedy Series	Stacy Moon (for "Life goes by too f**king fast, it really does.")	Nominated	
2026	Astra TV Awards	Best Cable Comedy Ensemble	The Chair Company	Nominated	
2026	Dorian TV Awards	Best TV Performance – Comedy	Tim Robinson	Nominated	
2026	Gotham TV Awards	Breakthrough Comedy Series	Zach Kanin, Tim Robinson, Adam McKay, Todd Schulman, Igor Srubshchik, and Andrew DeYoung	Nominated	
2026	Gotham TV Awards	Outstanding Lead Performance in a Comedy Series	Tim Robinson	Won	
2026	Primetime Emmy Awards	Outstanding Directing for a Comedy Series	Andrew DeYoung (for "Life goes by too f**king fast, it really does.")	Nominated	
2026	Primetime Emmy Awards	Outstanding Writing for a Comedy Series	Tim Robinson and Zach Kanin (for "Life goes by too f**king fast, it really does.")	Nominated	
2026	TCA Awards	Individual Achievement in Comedy	Tim Robinson	Nominated	
2026	Writers Guild of America Awards	Comedy Series	Zach Kanin, Gary Richardson, Tim Robinson, Marika Sawyer, Sarah Schneider, and John Solomon	Nominated	
2026	Writers Guild of America Awards	New Series	Zach Kanin, Gary Richardson, Tim Robinson, Marika Sawyer, Sarah Schneider, and John Solomon	Nominated	

=== Ratings ===
A total of 1.4 million viewers watched the premiere of The Chair Company over its first three days on HBO and its streaming service HBO Max, marking the network's biggest comedy debut in more than five years, since Avenue 5 in January 2020. It ranked among the top three comedy series premieres in HBO Max history, alongside And Just Like That... in 2021 and Our Flag Means Death in 2022. Most of its audience came from streaming, with about 124,000 viewers watching it during its linear HBO broadcast on premiere night, accounting for about 9% of the three-day total. The figures were about five times higher than those of Robinson and Kanin's earlier series Detroiters.

The second episode drew 1.5 million viewers across its first three days, a slight increase from the series premiere. After more than a week of availability, the premiere had reached 2.7 million total U.S. viewers, and the series as a whole averaged 2.1 million viewers per episode at the time of the second episode's release, more than double the average audience of previous HBO comedies such as Somebody Somewhere and The Rehearsal, though still below The Righteous Gemstones's 2.3 million average.
