= Andrew DeYoung (director) =

American director

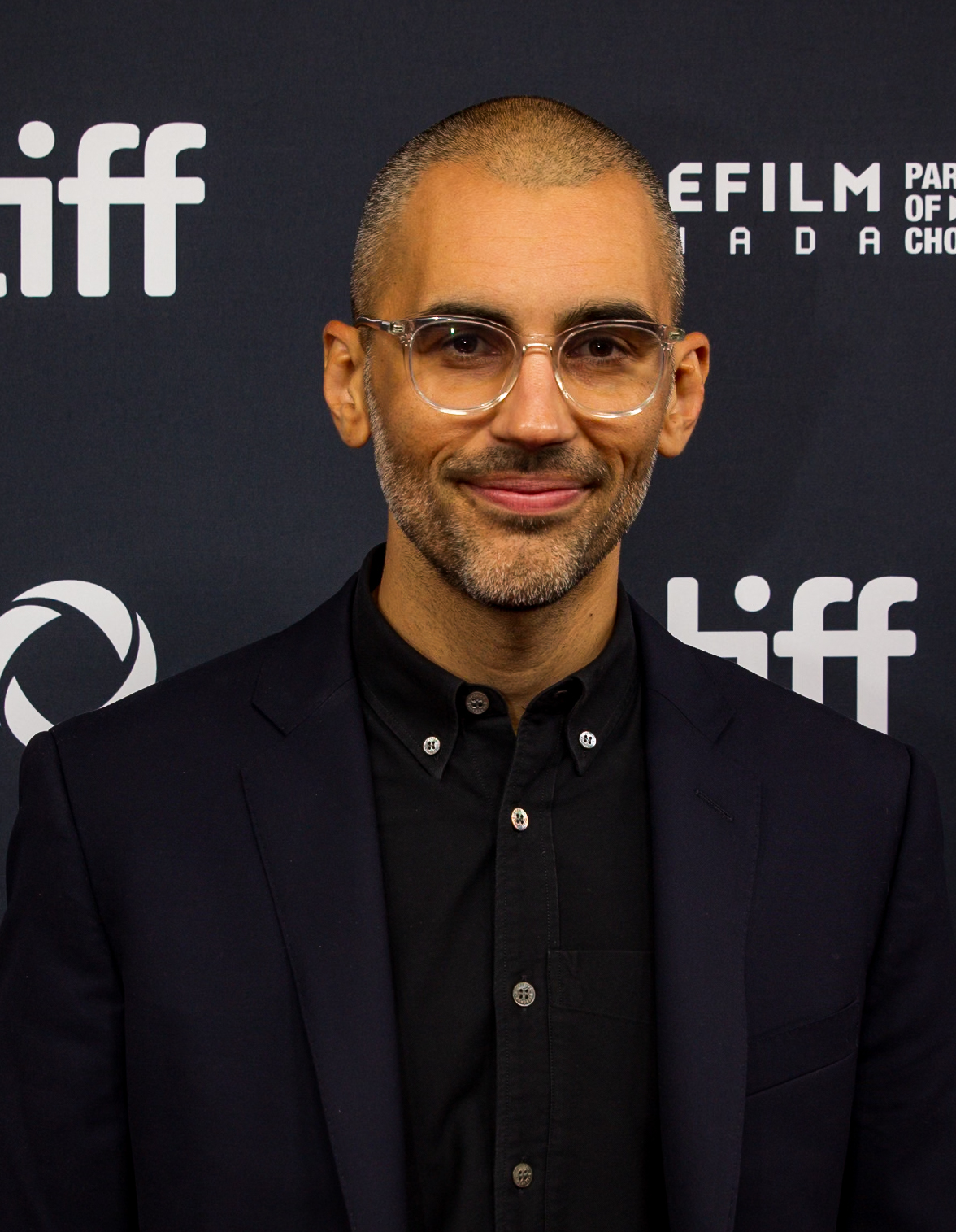
- DeYoung in 2024
- Born: 1981–1982
- Education: California State University, Northridge
- Occupations: Director, screenwriter, producer
- Years active: 2009–present

Andrew DeYoung is an American director, screenwriter, and producer. His television directorial credits include episodes of series such as Shrill (2019–2021), Pen15 (2019–2021), Our Flag Means Death (2022–2023), and The Chair Company (2025–present). DeYoung co-wrote and directed the variety special Would It Kill You to Laugh?, for which he was nominated for a Primetime Emmy Award. His frequent collaborators include Kate Berlant, John Early, and Tim Robinson.

In 2024, DeYoung wrote and directed his feature film debut, Friendship, which was nominated for a Critics' Choice Award and an Independent Spirit Award.

== Early life and education ==
DeYoung was born in 1981 or 1982, and raised in Fresno, California. He studied screenwriting at California State University, Northridge and graduated in 2005.

DeYoung is inspired by filmmaker Terrence Malick, who wrote a heartwarming letter to DeYoung before Friendship's SXSW premiere.

== Career ==
DeYoung began his directing career after college, and met comedians John Early and Kate Berlant in improv classes. He directed Early and Berlant in the short film Santa Monica and the Emmy-nominated special Would It Kill You to Laugh?. DeYoung continued directing episodes of various comedic television series.

DeYoung thought of the idea for Friendship after a negative experience with a colleague. DeYoung decided on casting his friend Tim Robinson while writing the film's screenplay, whom he had first met at the wedding of Conner O'Malley and Aidy Bryant, the former of which also appears in Friendship. The film was shot in Yonkers, New York, with actors Kate Mara and Paul Rudd joining the main cast. The film premiered at Toronto International Film Festival in September 2024 and was the second runner up for the People's Choice Award: Midnight Madness. A24 acquired U.S. distribution rights to the film, and the film was theatrically released on May 9, 2025. It was positively reviewed and went on to be nominated for the Critics' Choice Movie Award for Best Comedy and the Independent Spirit Award for Best First Screenplay.

In 2025, DeYoung continuted his collaboration with Robinson by directing multiple episodes and serving as an executive producer on The Chair Company, starring and co-written by Robinson, with DeYoung's direction being positively reviewed by critics.

== Filmography ==
=== Film ===
Year	Title	Notes
2024	Friendship	Also writer

=== Television ===
Year	Title	Notes
2016	John Glaser Loves Gear	10 episodes
2017	555	5 episodes
2017	Man Seeking Woman	2 episodes
2018-2019	A.P. Bio	3 episodes
2019	The Other Two	3 episodes
2020	Dave	3 episodes
2019-2021	Shrill	6 episodes
2019-2021	Pen15	6 episodes
2021	Miracle Workers	3 episodes
2022	I Love That for You	2 episodes
2022	Would It Kill You to Laugh? Starring Kate Berlant & John Early	Television special
2022-2023	Our Flag Means Death	4 episodes
2024	The Decameron	2 episodes
2025	The Chair Company	5 episodes, also executive producer
2026	Widow's Bay	2 episodes

== Awards and nominations ==
Year	Award	Category	Title	Result
2026	Film Independent Spirit Awards	Best First Screenplay	Friendship	Nominated
2017	Gotham Awards	Breakthrough Series – Short Form	555	Nominated
2026	Gotham Awards	Breakthrough Comedy Series	The Chair Company	Nominated
2023	Primetime Emmy Awards	Outstanding Writing for a Variety Special	Would It Kill You to Laugh? Starring Kate Berlant & John Early	Nominated
2026	Primetime Emmy Awards	Outstanding Directing for a Comedy Series	The Chair Company (for "Life Goes by Too F**king Fast, It Really Does.")	Nominated
