= Tim Robinson =

American comedian (born 1981)

- Born: May 23, 1981 (age 45); Detroit, Michigan, U.S.
- Occupations: Comedian; actor; screenwriter
- Years active: 2011–present
- Spouse: Heather Robinson (m. 2006)
- Children: 2

Tim Robinson (born May 23, 1981) is an American comedian, actor, and screenwriter. He first became known as a writer and performer on Saturday Night Live (2012–2016) before gaining wider recognition as the co-creator, co-writer, and star of the comedy series Detroiters (2017–2018), I Think You Should Leave with Tim Robinson (2019–2023), and The Chair Company (2025). He also starred in the A24 comedy film Friendship (2024).

== Early life ==
Robinson was born in Detroit, Michigan, on May 23, 1981, the son of a mother who worked for Chrysler and a father who worked in construction. He is of Italian, English and Polish descent. He grew up in suburban Waterford Township, graduating from Clarkston High School in 2000. His parents divorced when he was a child. Robinson has said that he "kind of grew up with two dads" in reference to his stepfather, who was Jewish and celebrated Hanukkah with him. He saw a live Second City comedy performance in Chicago as a teenager, and soon began taking weekend improv classes at its Detroit branch. While pursuing a comedy career, he supported himself by working in a toy store and teaching improv classes.

== Career ==
Robinson toured with Second City Detroit's touring company, then joined Second City Chicago. He has also performed at the iO Theater and Just for Laughs. He filmed a 2011 television pilot for Comedy Central called My Mans, but the show was not picked up by the network. In 2012, he was cast as a series regular in the unaired CBS sitcom Friend Me. In September 2012, he made his debut as a featured performer on Saturday Night Live. A year later, it was announced that he would work on the writing staff rather than continue being a performer, making him the second SNL cast member (after Brian Doyle-Murray) to go from performer to staff writer and the first SNL performer to become a writer after originally being cast solely as a performer. His celebrity impressions on the show included Ben Bailey and Bill Cowher, and he also portrayed the recurring character Carl, an elderly retail worker who would always get insulted by Niff (Bobby Moynihan) and Dana (Cecily Strong).

Robinson has appeared twice on late-night NBC talk show Late Night with Seth Meyers as Dale, who acts as host Seth Meyers' "emergency sidekick." His first appearance was during the "Next Week's News" sketch on February 28, 2014, and his second appearance was during the "Celebrity Drunk Texts" sketch on April 8, 2014. In 2016, he wrote and appeared in his own episode of the sketch comedy show Netflix Presents: The Characters. He is also the co-creator and co-star of Detroiters, along with fellow Detroit native and best friend Sam Richardson. The show premiered on Comedy Central in February 2017. In April 2017, he guest starred on Fox's Making History as Al Capone.

In 2018, Netflix commissioned I Think You Should Leave with Tim Robinson, a sketch comedy series created by and starring Robinson and produced by the members of The Lonely Island. It premiered in April 2019 and received critical acclaim, as did its second season, which premiered in July 2021. The series was renewed for a third season in May 2022, which premiered on May 30, 2023. In 2022 and 2023, Robinson won the Primetime Emmy Award for Outstanding Actor in a Short Form Comedy or Drama Series for his work on I Think You Should Leave.

One of the sketches on I Think You Should Leave, featuring Robinson costumed in a hot dog suit, became a popular meme in 2020. It has been frequently used to satirize public figures who attempt to dodge their own responsibility for controversial actions by promising to start an investigation. In the sketch, after a wiener-shaped car crashes into a clothing store, Robinson, in a hot dog costume, joins the crowd in the store, proclaiming, "We're all trying to find the guy who did this!"

Robinson voiced Creature, the player character's grenade launcher, in the first-person shooter video game High on Life (2022).

In 2024, Robinson starred in Friendship, a dark comedy directed by Andrew DeYoung in his feature debut. The film premiered at the 2024 Toronto International Film Festival and was acquired by A24 for U.S. distribution. It had a limited theatrical release on May 9, 2025, followed by a wider release on May 23. On October 12, 2025, HBO premiered The Chair Company. Robinson and Zach Kanin are credited as creators and producers, with Robinson starring in the comedy thriller.

== Personal life ==
Robinson married Heather, an electrical engineer for Chrysler, in September 2006. They were schoolmates and began dating as teenagers. They live in Los Angeles with their son and daughter.

Robinson has been an avid skateboarder since high school. He is a vegetarian and suffers from claustrophobia. He believes in the existence of aliens but not ghosts. His favorite film is Alfred Hitchcock's Strangers on a Train (1951). He is a fan of his hometown Detroit Lions and Detroit Pistons, and a lifelong fan of professional wrestling, which is occasionally featured or referenced in his work. Wrestlers who have done cameo roles in his shows include Brody King, Kevin Nash, Ryan Nemeth, Erick Rowan, and Aron Stevens.

== Filmography ==
Key
†	Denotes films that have not yet been released

=== Film ===
Year	Title	Role	Notes	Ref.
2016	Brother Nature	Ben Franklin		
2020	An American Pickle	Prosecuting Attorney		
2022	Chip 'n Dale: Rescue Rangers	Ugly Sonic	Voice	
2022	Aqua Teen Forever: Plantasm	Fraptaculan Tim	Voice	
2023	Scream VI	Paul 2.0 / Quinn's Hookup	Voice, uncredited	
2024	Friendship	Craig Waterman		
2026	The Angry Birds Movie 3 †	Porkchop	Voice	

=== Television ===
Year	Title	Role	Notes
2012	Friend Me	Sully	Unaired pilot
2012–2016	Saturday Night Live	Various characters	Featured player; 21 episodes Writer
2013–2014	The Awesomes	Various characters	2 episodes
2014	Comedy Bang! Bang!	Al Sorbinstein	Episode: "Craig Robinson Wears a Bordeaux Button Down & Dark Jeans"
2014	Late Night with Seth Meyers	Dale / Timmy the Late Night Superfan	3 episodes Uncredited
2015–2019	Documentary Now!	Young Barnabas Scott / Rick Kenmore	2 episodes
2016	Netflix Presents: The Characters	Various characters	Episode: "Tim Robinson"
2017	Man Seeking Woman	Paranormal Investigator	Episode: "Popcorn"
2017	Michael Bolton's Big, Sexy Valentine's Day Special	Chef Roy	Variety special
2017	Making History	Al Capone	2 episodes
2017–2018	Detroiters	Tim Cramblin	20 episodes Co-creator, co-writer, executive producer
2019	Your Pretty Face Is Going to Hell	Lip Licker	Episode: "Five-Card Duds"
2019–2020	Our Cartoon President	Brett Kavanaugh (voice)	8 episodes
2019–2023	I Think You Should Leave with Tim Robinson	Various characters	18 episodes Co-creator, co-writer, executive producer
2020	Star Trek: Lower Decks	Ensign Fletcher (voice)	Episode: "Terminal Provocations"
2020–2025	Big City Greens	Gregly (voice)	10 episodes
2021	Solar Opposites	Peter (voice)	Episode: "The Apple Pencil Pro"
2021–2023	Teenage Euthanasia	Uncle Pete (voice)	Main role
2021–2023	Ten Year Old Tom	Plumber (voice)	4 episodes
2022	Human Resources	Doug Fredrick (voice)	3 episodes
2022	Middlemost Post	Gum (voice)	Episode: "Inside Angus"
2023	The Simpsons	Mercer (voice)	Episode: "Homer's Adventures Through the Windshield Glass"
2023	Krapopolis	Cyclops (voice)	Episode: "Prometheus"
2023–present	Digman!	Swooper (voice)	Main role
2024	Invincible	Filip Schaff (voice)	Season 2
2024	Hailey's On It!	Mr. Hardmeier (voice)	Episode: "The Saw-Shank Redemption/No More Mr. Rice Guy"
2025	Hamster & Gretel	Ziggy (voice)	Episode: "Gretel Keeps It Reel"
2025	The Chair Company	William Ronald Trosper	Co-creator, co-writer, executive producer

=== Video games ===
Year	Title	Role	Notes	Ref(s).
2022	High on Life	Creature	Voice	
2026	High on Life 2	Creature	Voice	

== Awards and nominations ==
Year	Award	Category	Title	Result
2026	Gotham Awards	Breakthrough Comedy Series	The Chair Company	Nominated
2026	Gotham Awards	Outstanding Performance in a Comedy Series	The Chair Company	Won
2016	Primetime Emmy Awards	Outstanding Writing for a Variety Series	Saturday Night Live	Nominated
2022	Primetime Emmy Awards	Outstanding Short Form Comedy, Drama or Variety Series	I Think You Should Leave with Tim Robinson	Nominated
2022	Primetime Emmy Awards	Outstanding Actor in a Short Form Comedy or Drama Series	I Think You Should Leave with Tim Robinson	Won
2023	Primetime Emmy Awards	Outstanding Short Form Comedy, Drama or Variety Series	I Think You Should Leave with Tim Robinson	Won
2023	Primetime Emmy Awards	Outstanding Actor in a Short Form Comedy or Drama Series	I Think You Should Leave with Tim Robinson	Won
2026	Primetime Emmy Awards	Outstanding Writing for a Comedy Series	The Chair Company (for "Life Goes by Too F**king Fast, It Really Does.")	Nominated
2016	Writers Guild of America Awards	Best Comedy/Variety – Sketch Series	Saturday Night Live	Nominated
2017	Writers Guild of America Awards	Best Comedy/Variety – Sketch Series	Saturday Night Live	Won
2018	Writers Guild of America Awards	Best Comedy/Variety – Sketch Series	Saturday Night Live	Won
2018	Writers Guild of America Awards	Best Comedy/Variety – Specials	Michael Bolton's Big, Sexy Valentine's Day Special	Nominated
2020	Writers Guild of America Awards	Best Comedy/Variety – Sketch Series	I Think You Should Leave with Tim Robinson	Won
2022	Writers Guild of America Awards	Best Comedy/Variety – Sketch Series	I Think You Should Leave with Tim Robinson	Won
2024	Writers Guild of America Awards	Best Comedy/Variety – Sketch Series	I Think You Should Leave with Tim Robinson	Won
2026	Writers Guild of America Awards	Comedy Series	The Chair Company	Nominated
2026	Writers Guild of America Awards	New Series	The Chair Company	Nominated
