= Would It Kill You to Laugh? =

- Directed by: Andrew DeYoung
- Written by: Kate Berlant; Andrew DeYoung; John Early
- Produced by: Natalie Teter
- Starring: Kate Berlant; John Early
- Cinematography: Arlene Muller
- Edited by: Sophie Corra; Jonathan Kramer
- Production company: A24
- Distributed by: Peacock
- Release date: June 24, 2022
- Running time: 52 minutes
- Country: United States
- Language: English

Would It Kill You to Laugh? is a one-hour sketch comedy special directed by Andrew DeYoung starring Kate Berlant and John Early released on Peacock on June 24, 2022. Written by Berlant, DeYoung and Early, the special centres around an acerbic reunion of former stars of fictional sitcom He's Gay, She's Half-Jewish, interwoven with one-off shorter sketches. The special was critically well-received, and was nominated for Best Comedy Special at the 28th Critics' Choice Awards and Primetime Emmy Award for Outstanding Writing for a Variety Special.

== Premise ==
Berlant and Early, who play fictionalized versions of themselves in the future who had starred on the sitcom He's Gay, She's Half-Jewish and are reunited by Meredith Vieira after a bitter falling out. The framing device of the reunion is used to provide a throughline structure between short skits with absurdist characters.

== Writing and development ==
Would It Kill You to Laugh? was backed by both Peacock and A24. The special was directed by Andrew DeYoung, who co-wrote it with Berlant and Early.

=== Background ===
The sketches in the special developed out of inside jokes of Berlant and Early, who had met and become close friends and collaborators ten years prior on the New York comedy scene. Across film, television, podcasts and social media, the pair had developed a reputation for repulsive, narcissistic characters that had won them cult appeal among extremely online young millennials. The contrast between this image and the creators desire for earnestness was a source of inspiration for the material, with Early commenting "I think Kate and I have always been labeled as niche or rarefied in some way, whereas we’ve always seen ourselves leading the U.S.O. tours and performing for the troops".

Some of the sketches and characters had been created years before the special secured the budget that allowed them to be filmed; the reunion interview and sitcom set sketch had been intended for a sitcom pilot that had been set to film before the first COVID-19 lockdown in 2020. They were drawn to the format of the comedy special, of which Early commented "there's something very beautiful about these one-off things that can have their perfect little arcs".

=== Reunion sketch ===
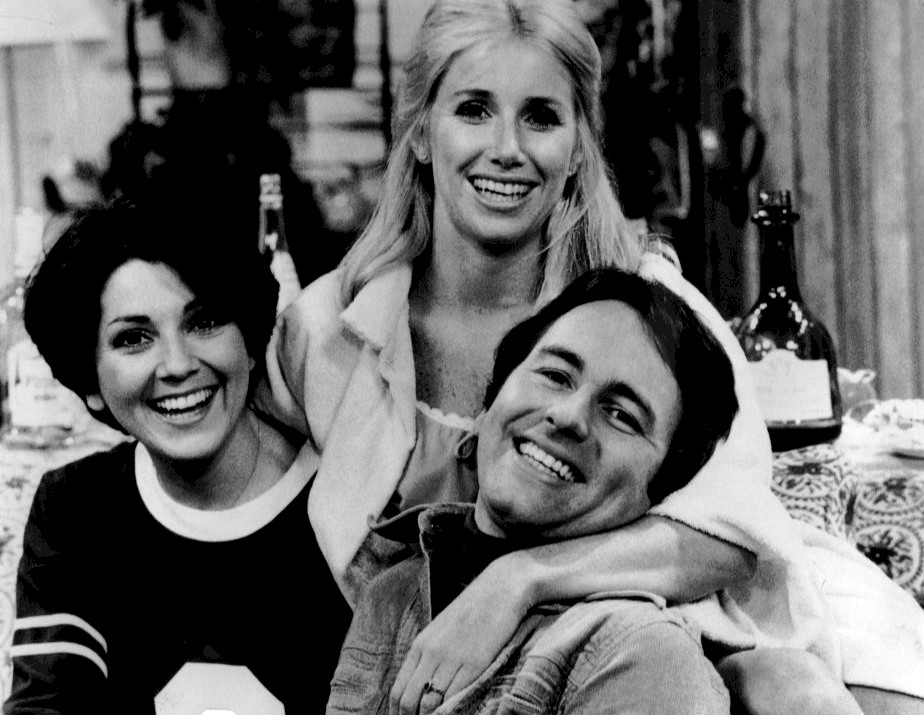
The reunion sketch was inspired by a 2012 interview between Three's Company stars Suzanne Somers and Joyce DeWitt. DeWitt (left) and Suzanne Somers (centre) pictured here with co-star John Ritter in the promotional photo of the series premiere of Three's Company, 1977

The framing sketch of the reunion of estranged former sitcom stars built on material Berlant and Early had developed showcasing mutual contempt, including 2019 sketch “How Have You Been” wherein ex-friends serendipitously meet at a homeware store. It also plays on the public perception of Berlant and Early's personal relationship, of which the latter commented "I think we’ve been very public, perhaps cloyingly so, about the mythology of our friendship [...] We are very romantic and religious about it, so I think there’s something funny about creating a counter-narrative where there’s been a bitter feud, and we’re smiling at each other, but with this rushing river of hostility underneath it."

The reunion sketch in Would It Kill You to Laugh was specifically inspired by a real-life interview that Suzanne Somers did with Three's Company co-star Joyce DeWitt on the former's online talk show Suzanne Somers Breaking Through in 2012. Berlant considered the Somers-DeWitt interview to be "competition to come across the most open and empathetic", while Early, who introduced Berlant to it early in their friendship, described it as "incredibly layered" and compared it to the work of Ingmar Bergman.

The tone of the reunion was influenced by Barbara Walters' interview of Monica Lewinsky, and Katie Couric's with Sarah Palin, which Berlant cited as "[t]hose kinds of interviews where it's all about getting to the truth, getting to the raw nerve, to the bone, and of course, hyper-choreographed". The creators offered the role of the reunion anchor to Meredith Vieira, like Walters a long-time host of The View, to lend gravitas to the scene, and were surprised when she accepted.

=== Influences ===
The creators drew on the long, interconnected, conversational sketch comedy of French and Saunders (1987–1993), the emotion-laden absurdism of British TV series The Office (2001–2003), celebrity house tours by Architectural Digest, and the everyday mundanity featured in the 2022 murder docuseries The Staircase. They also cited cult classic sitcom Strangers With Candy (1999) as an influence, with Early saying: "It pushes back against schmaltziness in general, I feel a real kinship with that. It's irreverent and it's handled so well that it feels very personal." The creators were conscious of the way social media had influenced the development of short form comedy and wanted theirs to be more timeless:

Yes, the special's an hour, technically 52 minutes, but the sketches themselves take their time. They're emotional, there's silence, they're conversational, there's something I think very soothing about a lot of the sketches. They can get very quiet and I would say some of them are very tender. I think there's an assumption on the part of these tech companies that when people are moving away from a video after three seconds, it's because they don't like the video. I don't know if that's the case. I think people might be just deeply bored and depressed by the state of culture. No one's taking care of anyone. I think it's really foolish to assume that human beings prefer their comedy and content in these tiny little bites.

— Early in an interview with Thrillist, June 2022

== Reception and recognition ==
Paste positively compared Would It Kill You to Laugh? to Bo Burnham's acclaimed 2021 special Inside for the way that both use identity in comedy to cause audience reflection, and praised its "no-holds-barred surrealism". Vulture praised the work as a "thoughtful and striking about partnerships and, in particular, about male–female relationships" and considered it "darker and more alarming" than Berlant and Early's previous collaborations. Decider recommended that audiences view it for the pair's ability to mine the "rich comedic tradition for overconfident characters who find themselves in way over their heads but cannot seem to get themselves out of the situation without making things worse".

The special was nominated for Best Comedy Special at the 28th Critics' Choice Awards and Outstanding Writing for a Variety Special at the 75th Primetime Creative Arts Emmy Awards. Melissa DeLizia's casting work on the special was nominated in the Live Television Performance, Variety, or Sketch – Comedy, Drama, or Musical category at the 39th Artios Awards.
