= 28th Critics' Choice Awards =

2023 US film and television awards

- Official poster
- Date: January 15, 2023
- Site: Fairmont Century Plaza Hotel, Los Angeles, California, United States
- Hosted by: Chelsea Handler

Highlights
- Most wins: Film: Everything Everywhere All at Once (5); Television: Better Call Saul (3)
- Most nominations: Film: Everything Everywhere All at Once (14); Television: Abbott Elementary (6)
- Best Picture: Everything Everywhere All at Once
- Best Comedy Series: Abbott Elementary
- Best Drama Series: Better Call Saul
- Best Limited Series: The Dropout
- Best Movie Made for Television: Weird: The Al Yankovic Story
- Website: www.criticschoice.com

Television/radio coverage
- Network: The CW

The 28th Critics' Choice Awards were presented on January 15, 2023, at the Fairmont Century Plaza Hotel in Los Angeles, California, honoring the finest achievements of filmmaking and television programming in 2022. The ceremony was broadcast on The CW and hosted by Chelsea Handler, taking over the reins from Taye Diggs who had hosted the show consecutively in the previous four years.

Like in the previous two years, film and television nominations were announced separately. The television nominations were announced on December 6, 2022. The film nominations were announced on December 14, 2022.

Everything Everywhere All at Once led the film nominations with 14—a then-record shared with The Shape of Water (2017), The Favourite (2018), and The Irishman (2019)—followed by The Fabelmans with 11. ABC's first-year mockumentary comedy Abbott Elementary led the television nominations with six, followed by Better Call Saul's sixth and final season with five. Overall, Netflix received a total of 28 nominations, 13 for film and 15 for television, the most for any studio or network (for the sixth year in a row).

== Winners and nominees ==
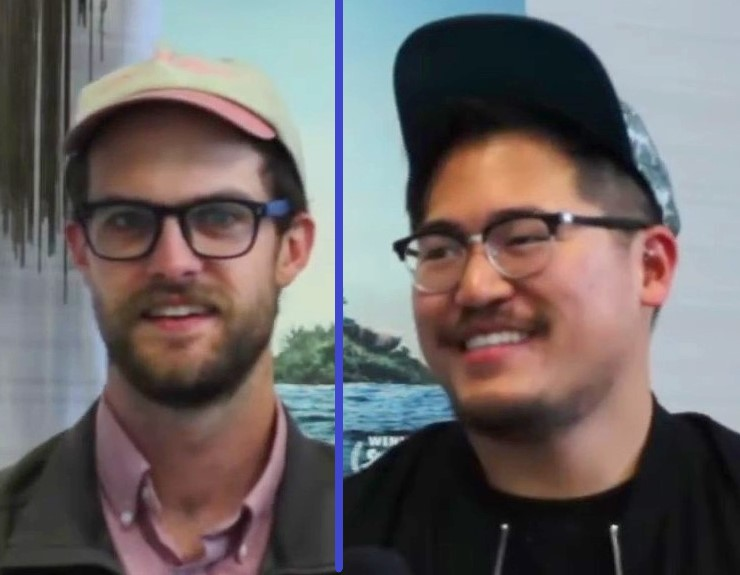
Daniel Kwan and Daniel Scheinert, Best Director and Best Original Screenplay winners

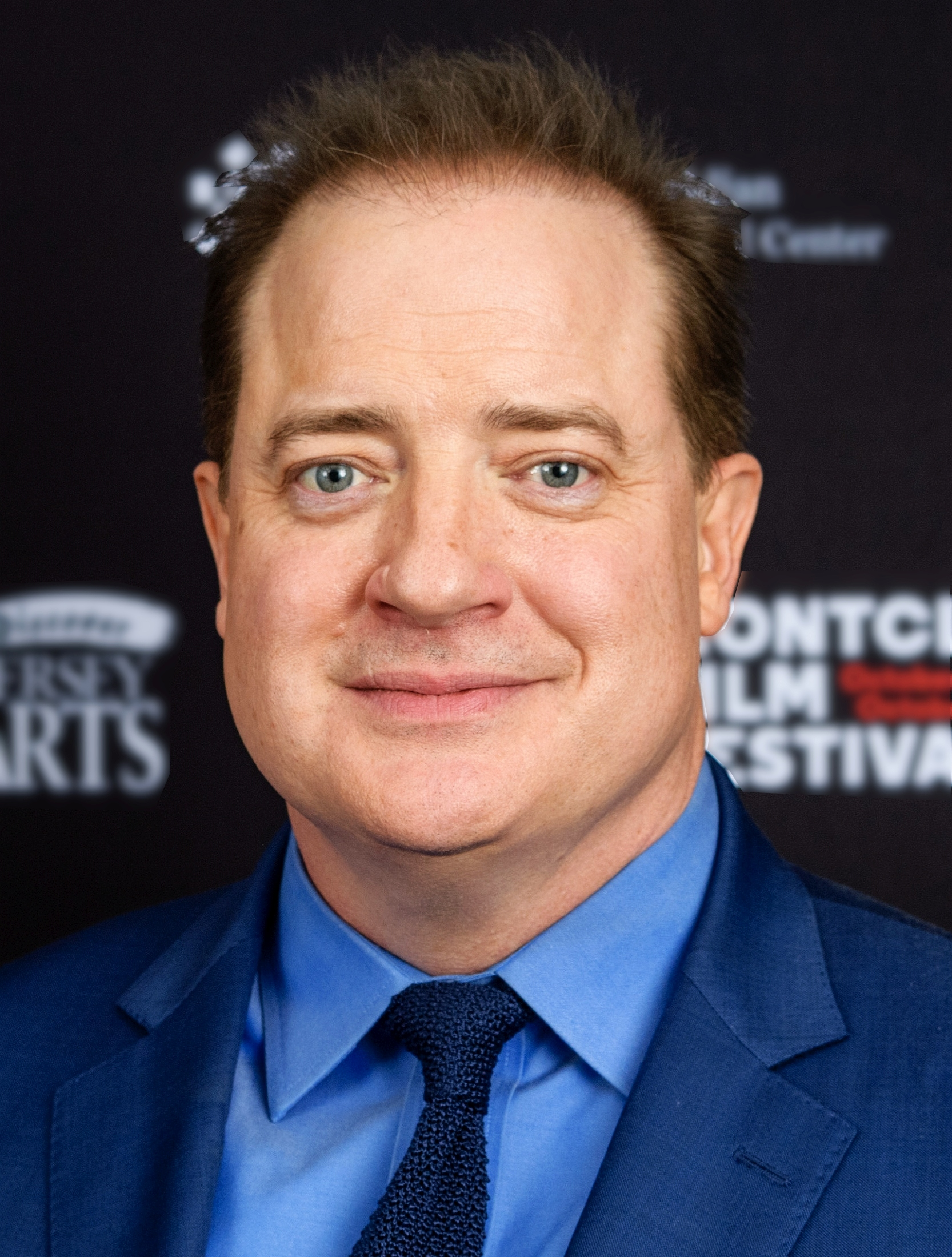
Brendan Fraser, Best Actor winner

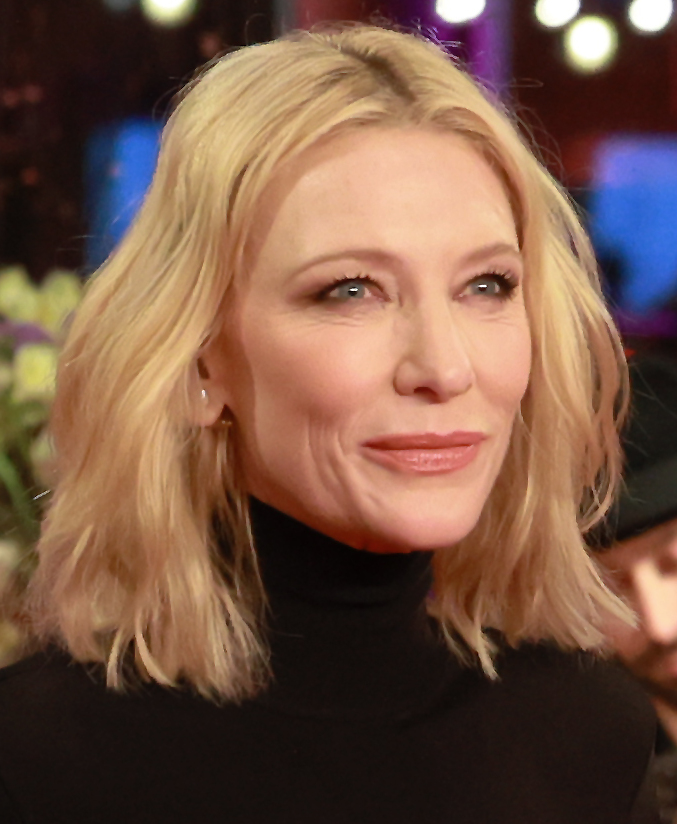
Cate Blanchett, Best Actress winner

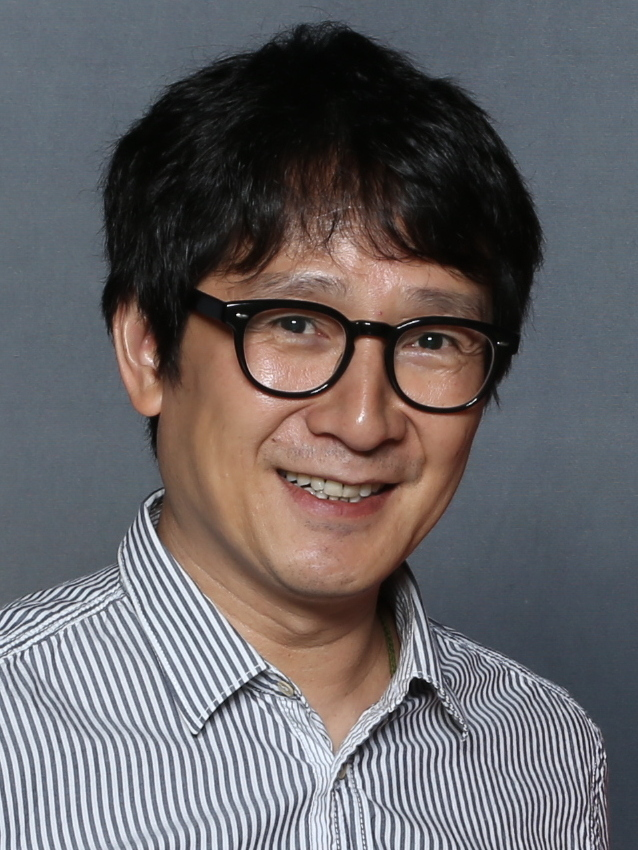
Ke Huy Quan, Best Supporting Actor winner

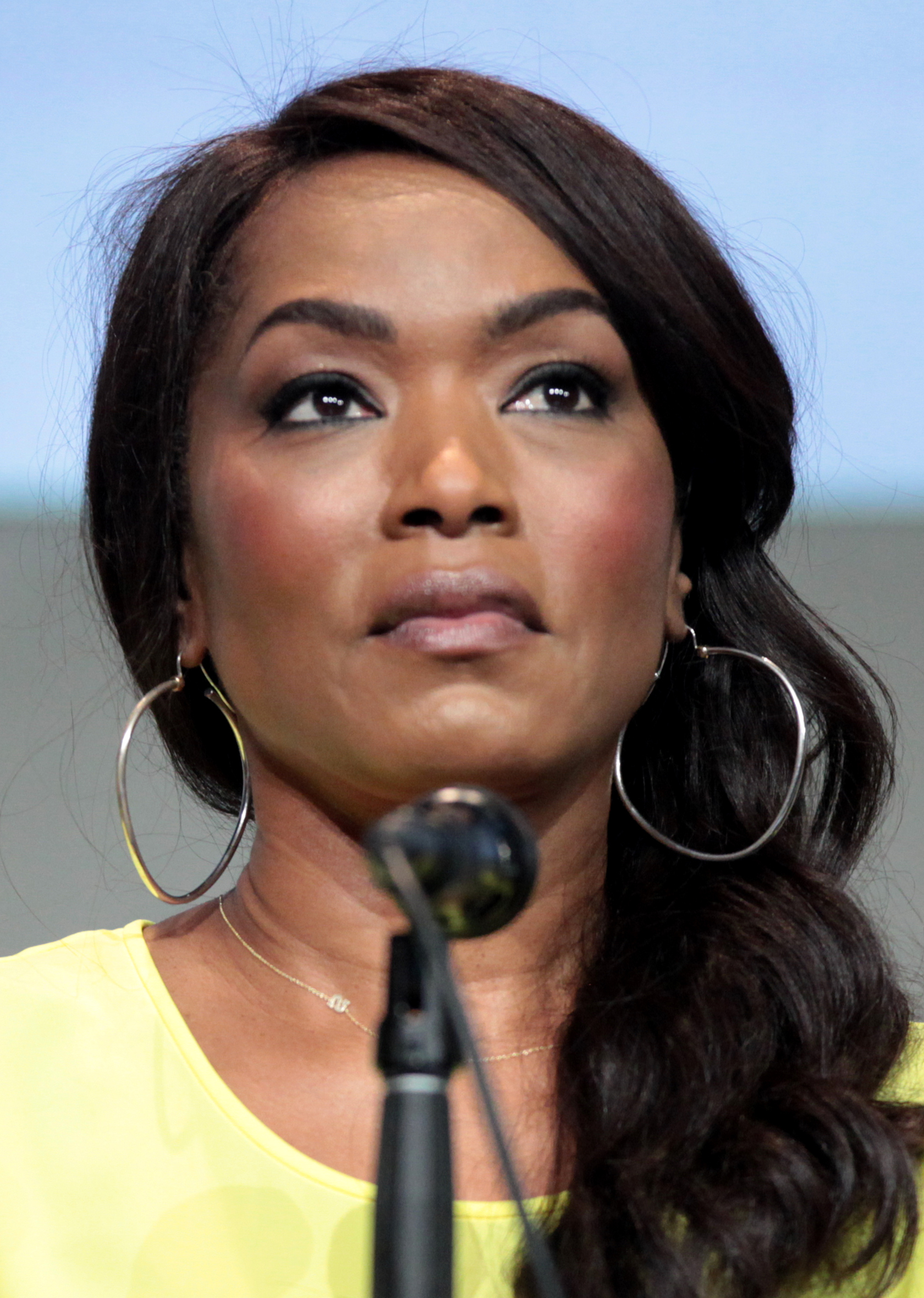
Angela Bassett, Best Supporting Actress winner

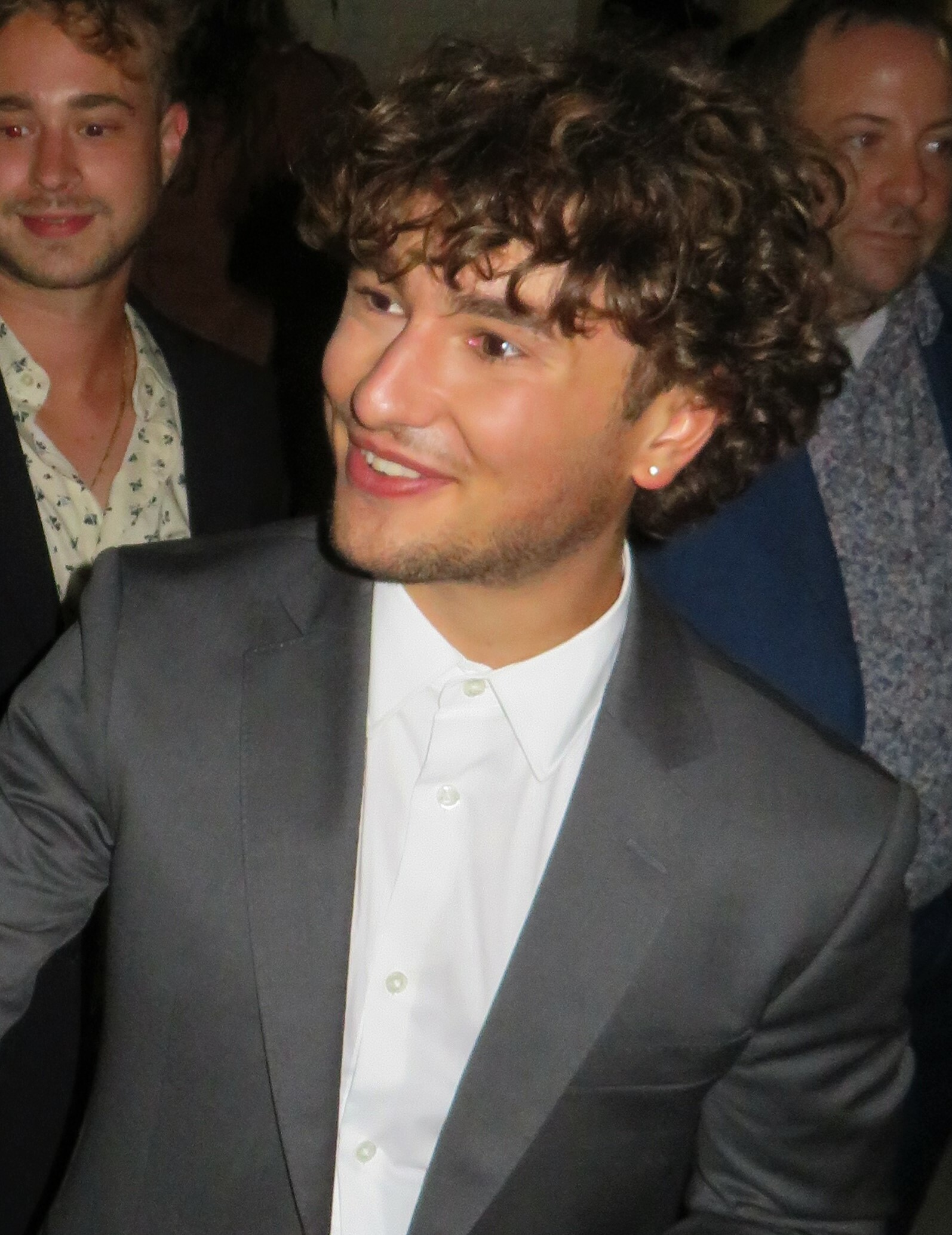
Gabriel LaBelle, Best Young Actor/Actress winner

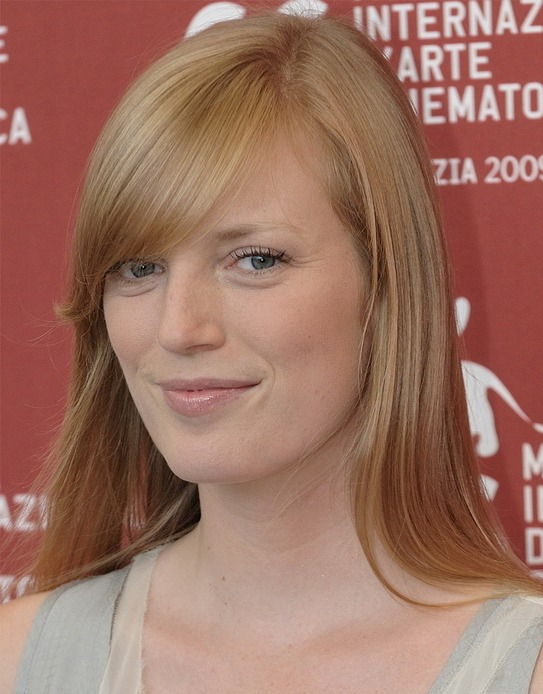
Sarah Polley, Best Adapted Screenplay winner

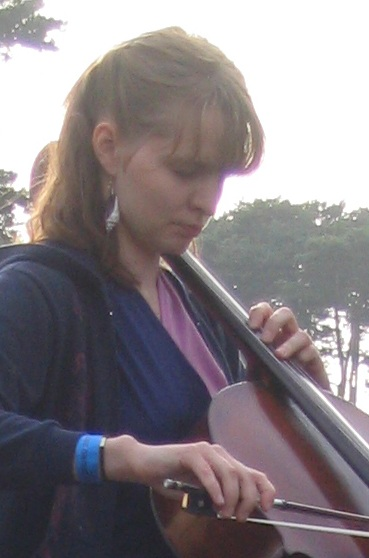
Hildur Guðnadóttir, Best Score winner

=== Film ===
Best Picture: Everything Everywhere All at Once (Note: Won for Best Science Fiction/Fantasy Movie at the 3rd Critics' Choice Super Awards); Avatar: The Way of Water (Note: Nominated for Best Science Fiction/Fantasy Movie at the 3rd Critics' Choice Super Awards); Babylon; The Banshees of Inisherin; Elvis; The Fabelmans; Glass Onion: A Knives Out Mystery; RRR (Note: Nominated for Best Action Movie at the 3rd Critics' Choice Super Awards); Tár; Top Gun: Maverick (Note: Won for Best Action Movie at the 3rd Critics' Choice Super Awards); Women Talking	Best Director: Daniel Kwan and Daniel Scheinert – Everything Everywhere All at Once; James Cameron – Avatar: The Way of Water; Damien Chazelle – Babylon; Todd Field – Tár; Baz Luhrmann – Elvis; Martin McDonagh – The Banshees of Inisherin; Sarah Polley – Women Talking; Gina Prince-Bythewood – The Woman King; S. S. Rajamouli – RRR; Steven Spielberg – The Fabelmans
Best Actor: Brendan Fraser – The Whale as Charlie; Austin Butler – Elvis as Elvis Presley; Tom Cruise – Top Gun: Maverick as Captain Pete "Maverick" Mitchell (Note: Won for Best Actor in an Action Movie at the 3rd Critics' Choice Super Awards); Colin Farrell – The Banshees of Inisherin as Pádraic Súilleabháin; Paul Mescal – Aftersun as Calum Paterson; Bill Nighy – Living as Mr. Williams	Best Actress: Cate Blanchett – Tár as Lydia Tár; Viola Davis – The Woman King as General Nanisca (Note: Won for Best Actress in an Action Movie at the 3rd Critics' Choice Super Awards); Danielle Deadwyler – Till as Mamie Till-Mobley; Margot Robbie – Babylon as Nellie LaRoy; Michelle Williams – The Fabelmans as Mitzi Fabelman; Michelle Yeoh – Everything Everywhere All at Once as Evelyn Quan Wang (Note: Won for Best Actress in a Science Fiction/Fantasy Movie at the 3rd Critics' Choice Super Awards)
Best Supporting Actor: Ke Huy Quan – Everything Everywhere All at Once as Waymond Wang (Note: Won for Best Actor in a Science Fiction/Fantasy Movie at the 3rd Critics' Choice Super Awards); Paul Dano – The Fabelmans as Burt Fabelman; Brendan Gleeson – The Banshees of Inisherin as Colm Doherty; Brian Tyree Henry – Causeway as James; Judd Hirsch – The Fabelmans as Uncle Boris; Barry Keoghan – The Banshees of Inisherin as Dominic Kearney	Best Supporting Actress: Angela Bassett – Black Panther: Wakanda Forever as Queen Ramonda (Note: Won for Best Actress in a Superhero Movie at the 3rd Critics' Choice Super Awards); Jessie Buckley – Women Talking as Mariche; Kerry Condon – The Banshees of Inisherin as Siobhán Súilleabháin; Jamie Lee Curtis – Everything Everywhere All at Once as Deirdre Beaubeirdre; Stephanie Hsu – Everything Everywhere All at Once as Joy Wang / Jobu Tupaki (Note: Nominated for Best Actress in a Science Fiction/Fantasy Movie at the 3rd Critics' Choice Super Awards); Janelle Monáe – Glass Onion: A Knives Out Mystery as Helen Brand / Cassandra "Andi" Brand
Best Young Actor/Actress: Gabriel LaBelle – The Fabelmans as Sammy Fabelman; Frankie Corio – Aftersun as Sophie Paterson; Jalyn Hall – Till as Emmett Till; Bella Ramsey – Catherine Called Birdy as Lady Catherine / Birdy; Banks Repeta – Armageddon Time as Paul Graff; Sadie Sink – The Whale as Ellie	Best Acting Ensemble: Glass Onion: A Knives Out Mystery; The Banshees of Inisherin; Everything Everywhere All at Once; The Fabelmans; The Woman King; Women Talking
Best Original Screenplay: Daniel Kwan and Daniel Scheinert – Everything Everywhere All at Once; Todd Field – Tár; Tony Kushner and Steven Spielberg – The Fabelmans; Martin McDonagh – The Banshees of Inisherin; Charlotte Wells – Aftersun	Best Adapted Screenplay: Sarah Polley – Women Talking; Samuel D. Hunter – The Whale; Kazuo Ishiguro – Living; Rian Johnson – Glass Onion: A Knives Out Mystery; Rebecca Lenkiewicz – She Said
Best Cinematography: Claudio Miranda – Top Gun: Maverick; Russell Carpenter – Avatar: The Way of Water; Roger Deakins – Empire of Light; Florian Hoffmeister – Tár; Janusz Kamiński – The Fabelmans; Linus Sandgren – Babylon	Best Editing: Paul Rogers – Everything Everywhere All at Once; Tom Cross – Babylon; Eddie Hamilton – Top Gun: Maverick; Stephen Rivkin, David Brenner, John Refoua, and James Cameron – Avatar: The Way of Water; Matt Villa and Jonathan Redmond – Elvis; Monika Willi – Tár
Best Costume Design: Ruth E. Carter – Black Panther: Wakanda Forever; Jenny Eagan – Glass Onion: A Knives Out Mystery; Shirley Kurata – Everything Everywhere All at Once; Catherine Martin – Elvis; Gersha Phillips – The Woman King; Mary Zophres – Babylon	Best Production Design: Florencia Martin and Anthony Carlino – Babylon; Hannah Beachler and Lisa K. Sessions – Black Panther: Wakanda Forever; Rick Carter and Karen O'Hara – The Fabelmans; Dylan Cole, Ben Procter, and Vanessa Cole – Avatar: The Way of Water; Jason Kisvarday and Kelsi Ephraim – Everything Everywhere All at Once; Catherine Martin, Karen Murphy, and Bev Dunn – Elvis
Best Score: Hildur Guðnadóttir – Tár; Alexandre Desplat – Guillermo del Toro's Pinocchio; Michael Giacchino – The Batman; Hildur Guðnadóttir – Women Talking; Justin Hurwitz – Babylon; John Williams – The Fabelmans	Best Song: "Naatu Naatu" – RRR; "Carolina" – Where the Crawdads Sing; "Ciao Papa" – Guillermo del Toro's Pinocchio; "Hold My Hand" – Top Gun: Maverick; "Lift Me Up" – Black Panther: Wakanda Forever; "New Body Rhumba" – White Noise
Best Hair and Makeup: Elvis; Babylon; The Batman; Black Panther: Wakanda Forever; Everything Everywhere All at Once; The Whale	Best Visual Effects: Avatar: The Way of Water; The Batman; Black Panther: Wakanda Forever; Everything Everywhere All at Once; RRR; Top Gun: Maverick
Best Animated Feature: Guillermo del Toro's Pinocchio; Marcel the Shell with Shoes On; Puss in Boots: The Last Wish; Turning Red; Wendell & Wild	Best Comedy: Glass Onion: A Knives Out Mystery; The Banshees of Inisherin; Bros; Everything Everywhere All at Once; Triangle of Sadness; The Unbearable Weight of Massive Talent
Best Foreign Language Film: RRR • India; All Quiet on the Western Front • Germany; Argentina, 1985 • Argentina; Bardo, False Chronicle of a Handful of Truths • Mexico; Close • Belgium; Decision to Leave • South Korea

==== #SeeHer Award ====
- Janelle Monáe

==== Lifetime Achievement Award ====
- Jeff Bridges

=== Television ===
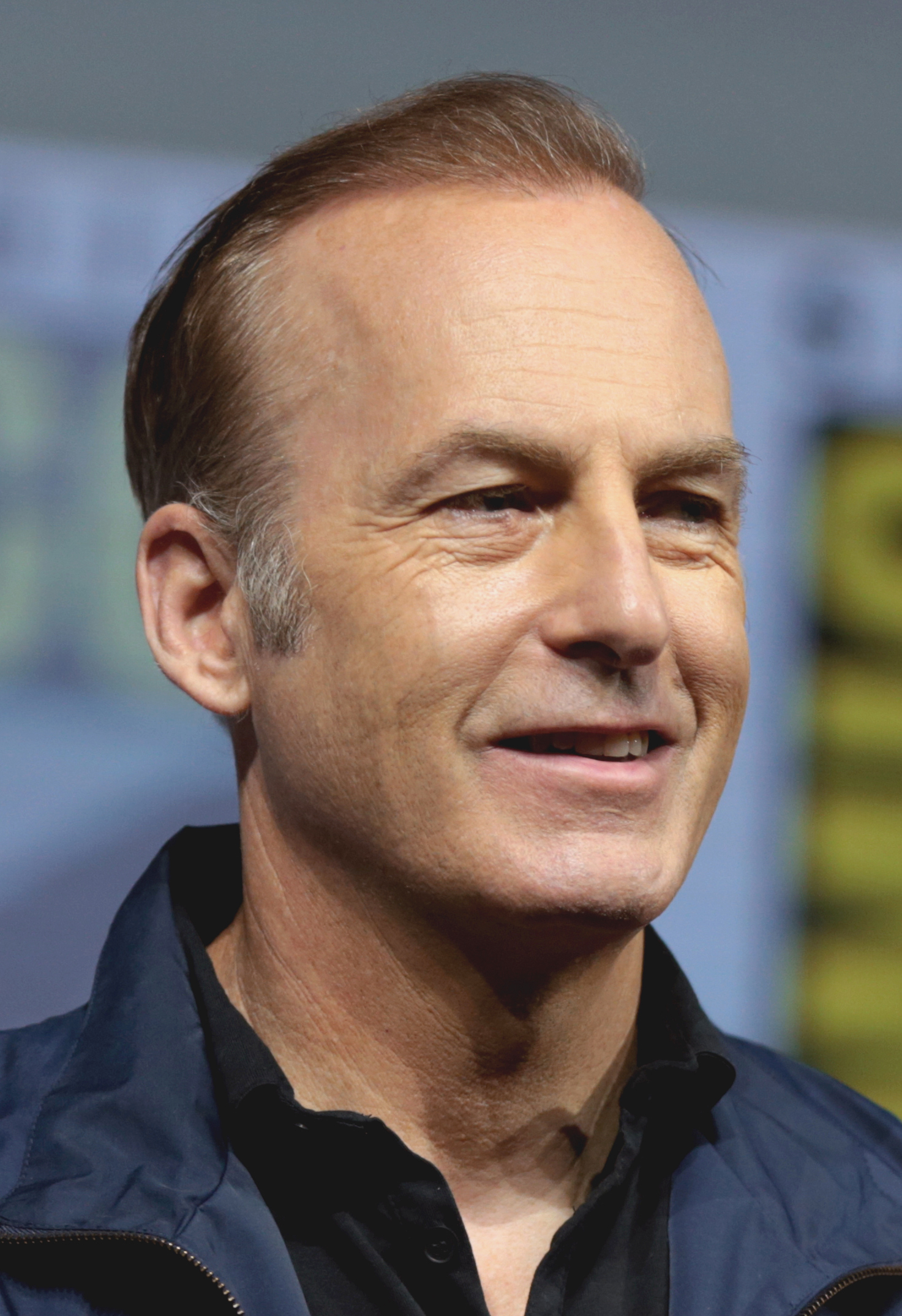
Bob Odenkirk, Best Actor in a Drama Series winner

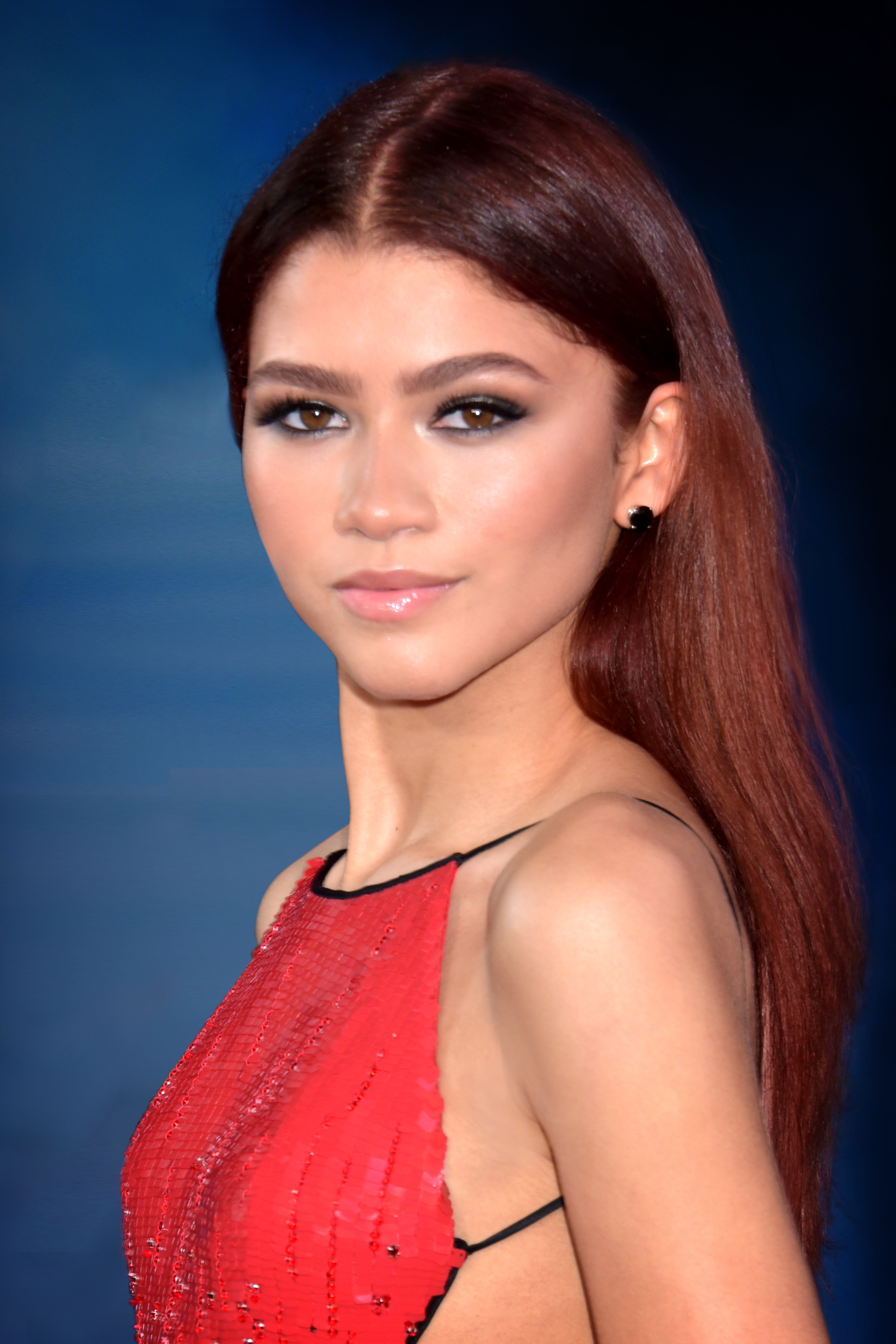
Zendaya, Best Actress in a Drama Series winner

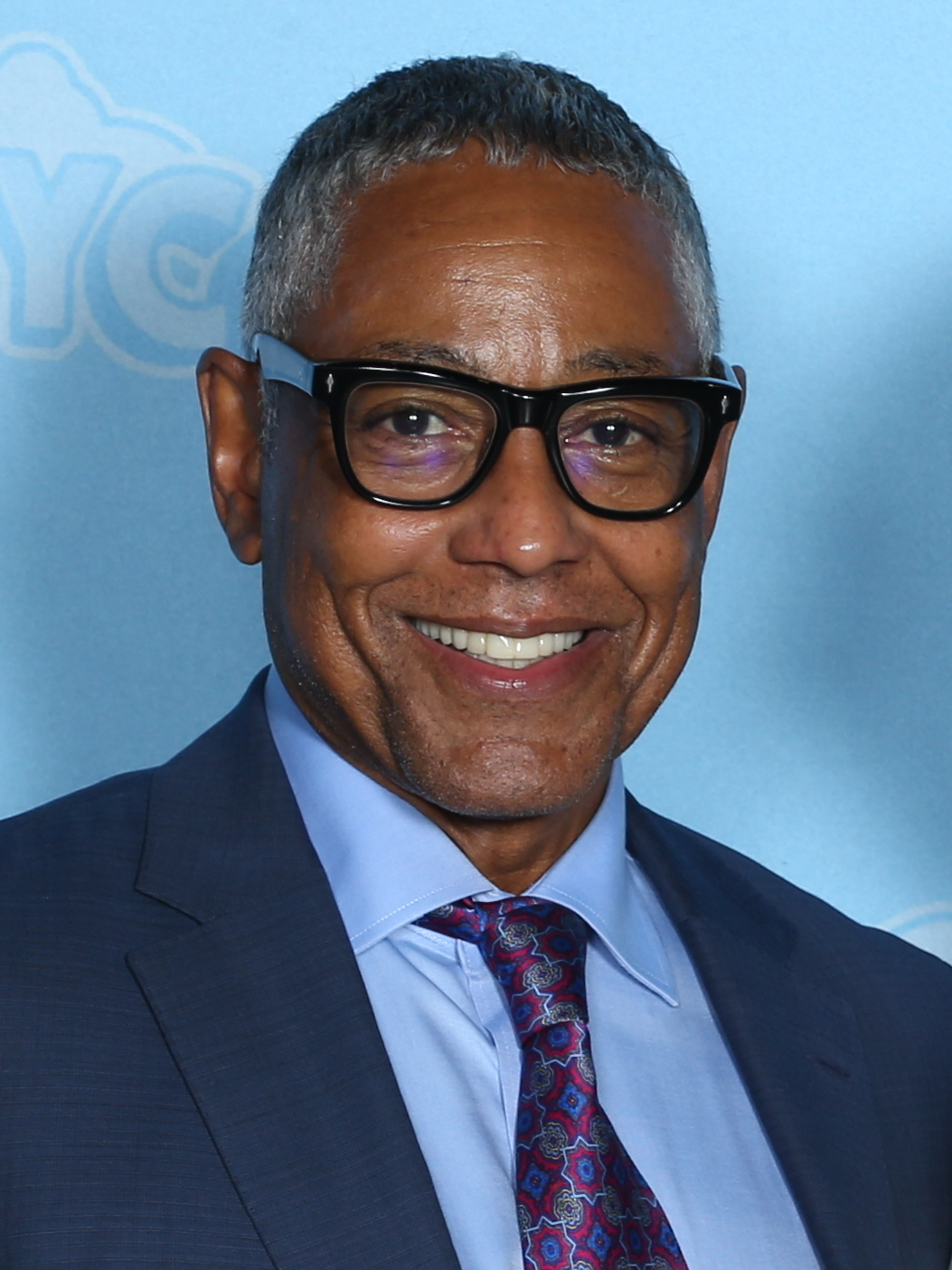
Giancarlo Esposito, Best Supporting Actor in a Drama Series winner

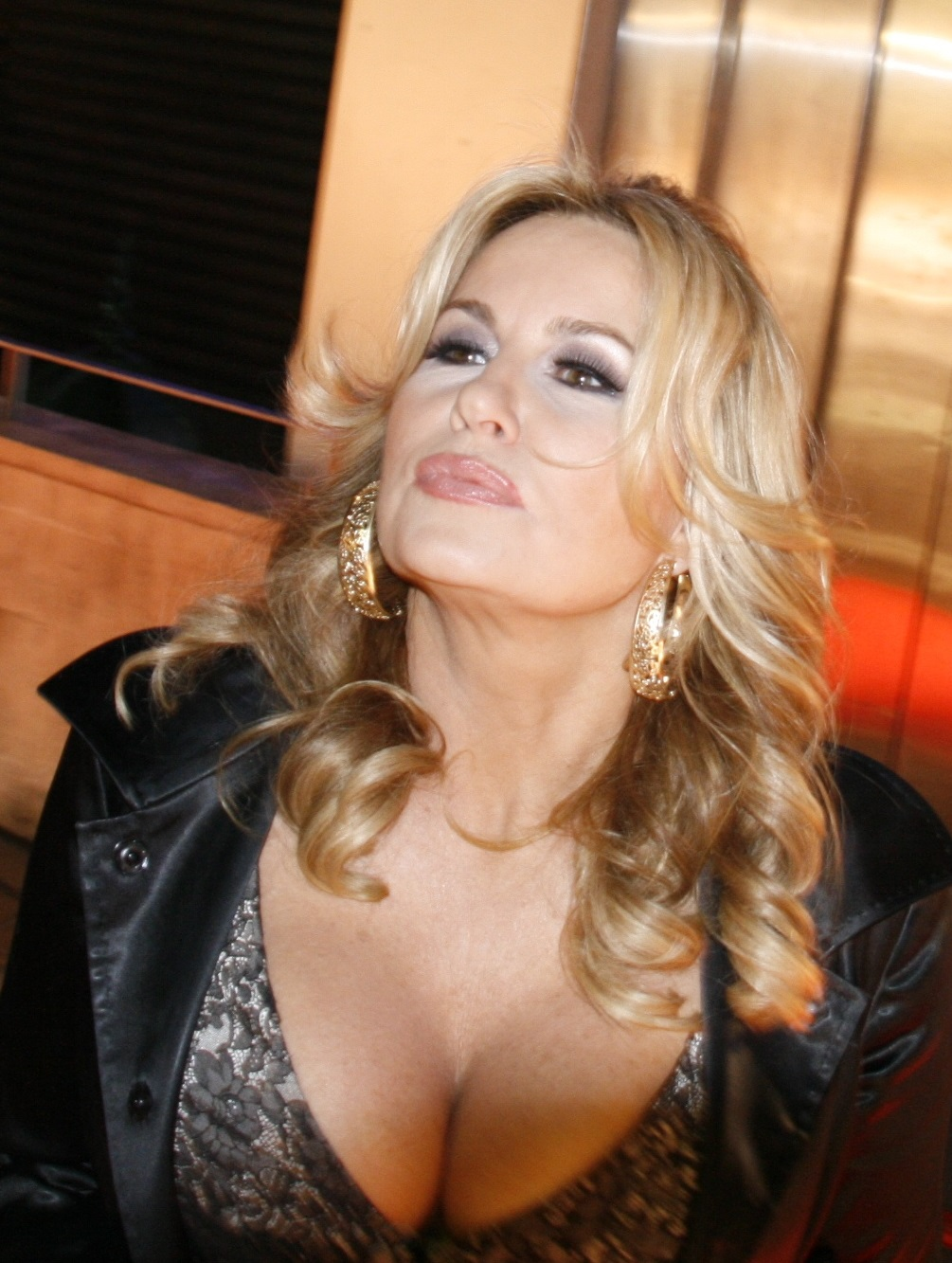
Jennifer Coolidge, Best Supporting Actress in a Drama Series winner

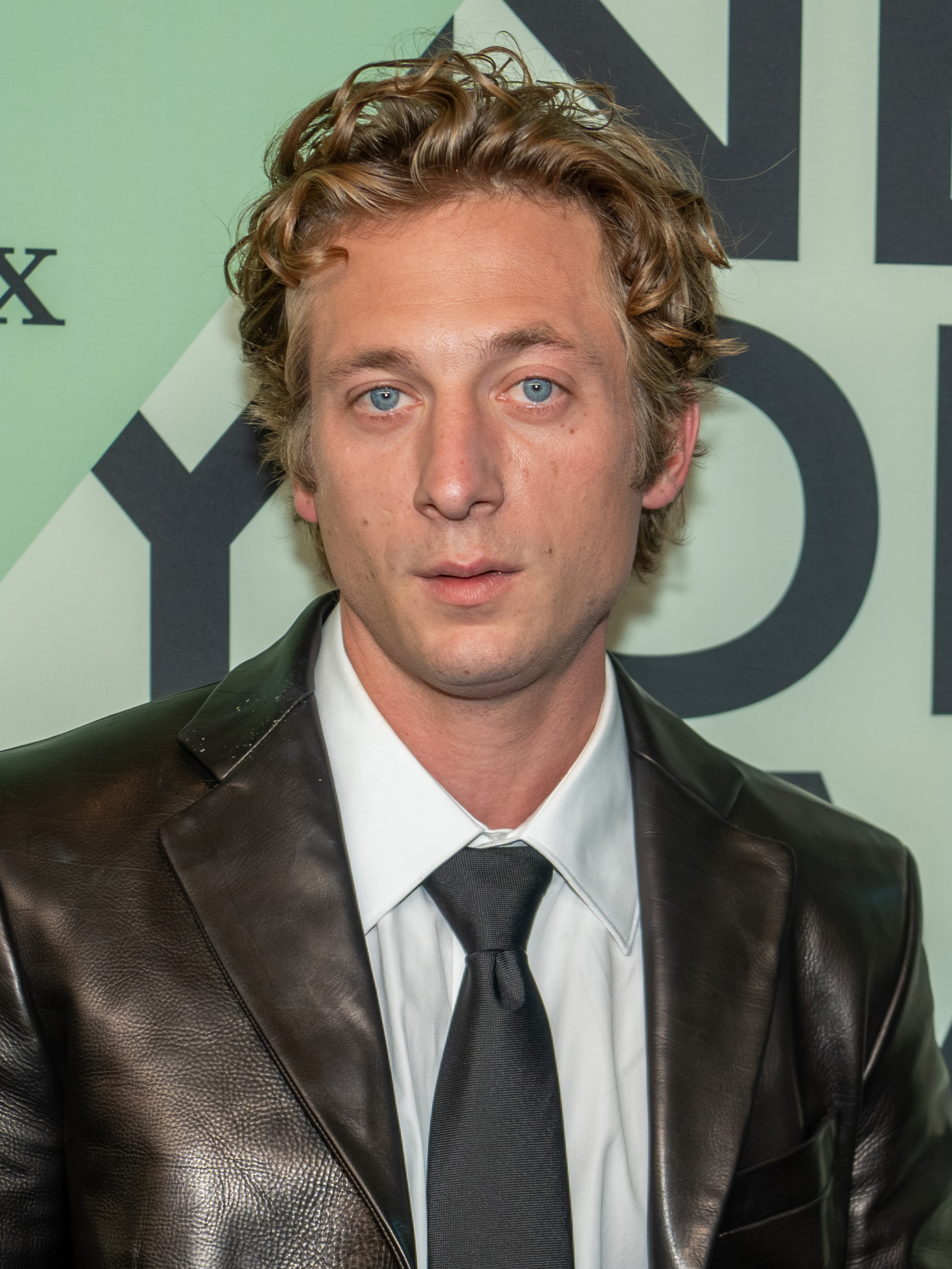
Jeremy Allen White, Best Actor in a Comedy Series winner

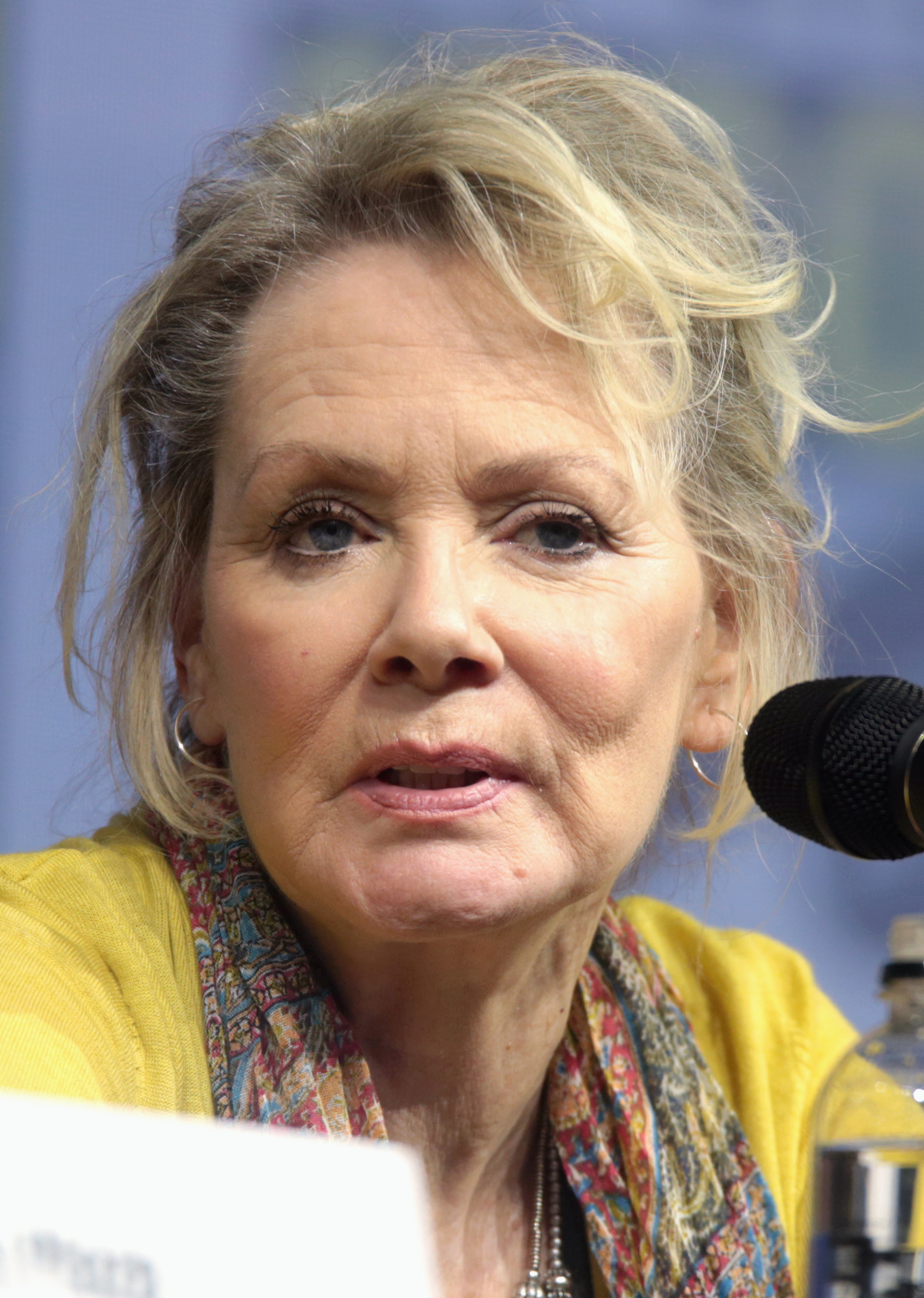
Jean Smart, Best Actress in a Comedy Series winner

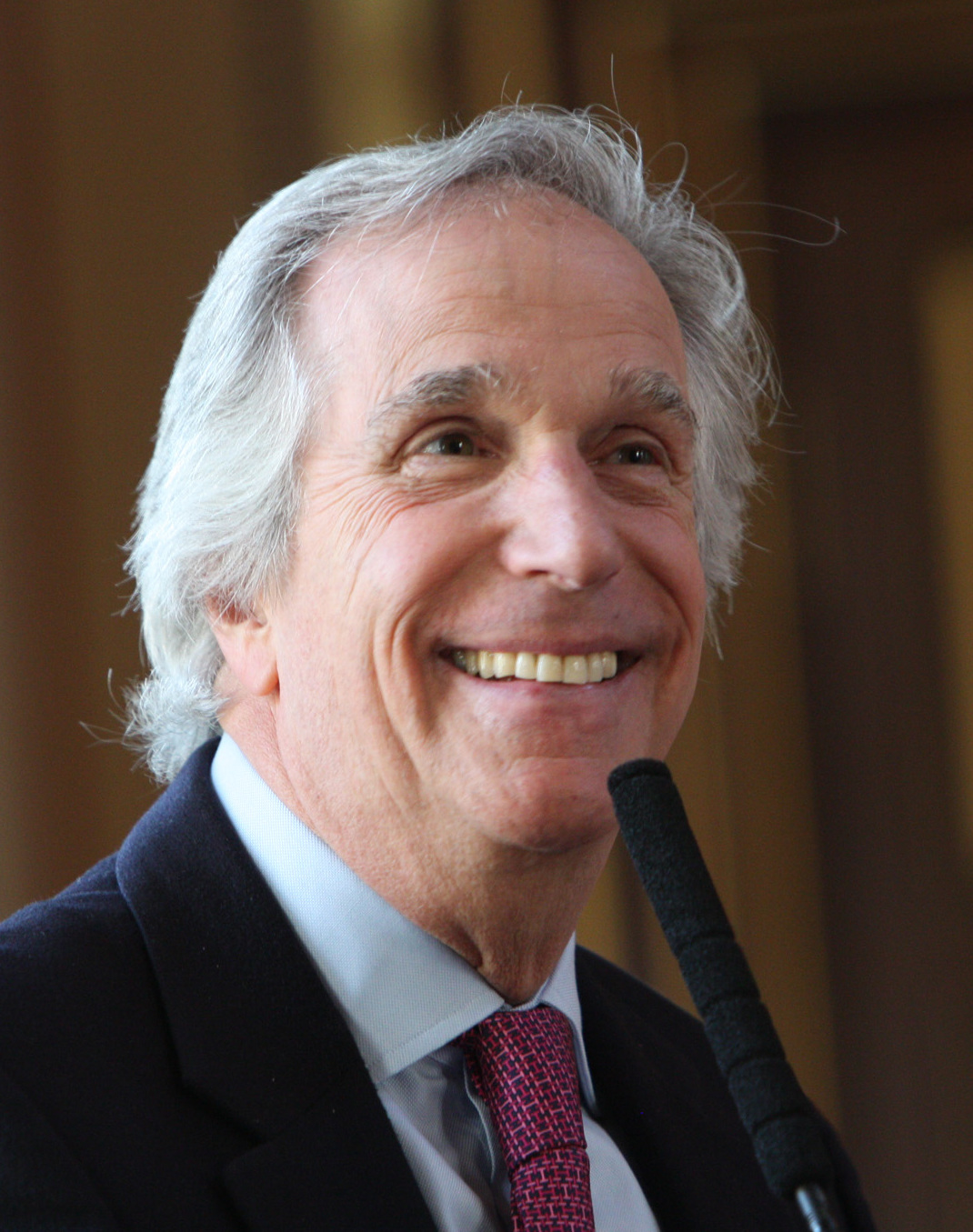
Henry Winkler, Best Supporting Actor in a Comedy Series winner

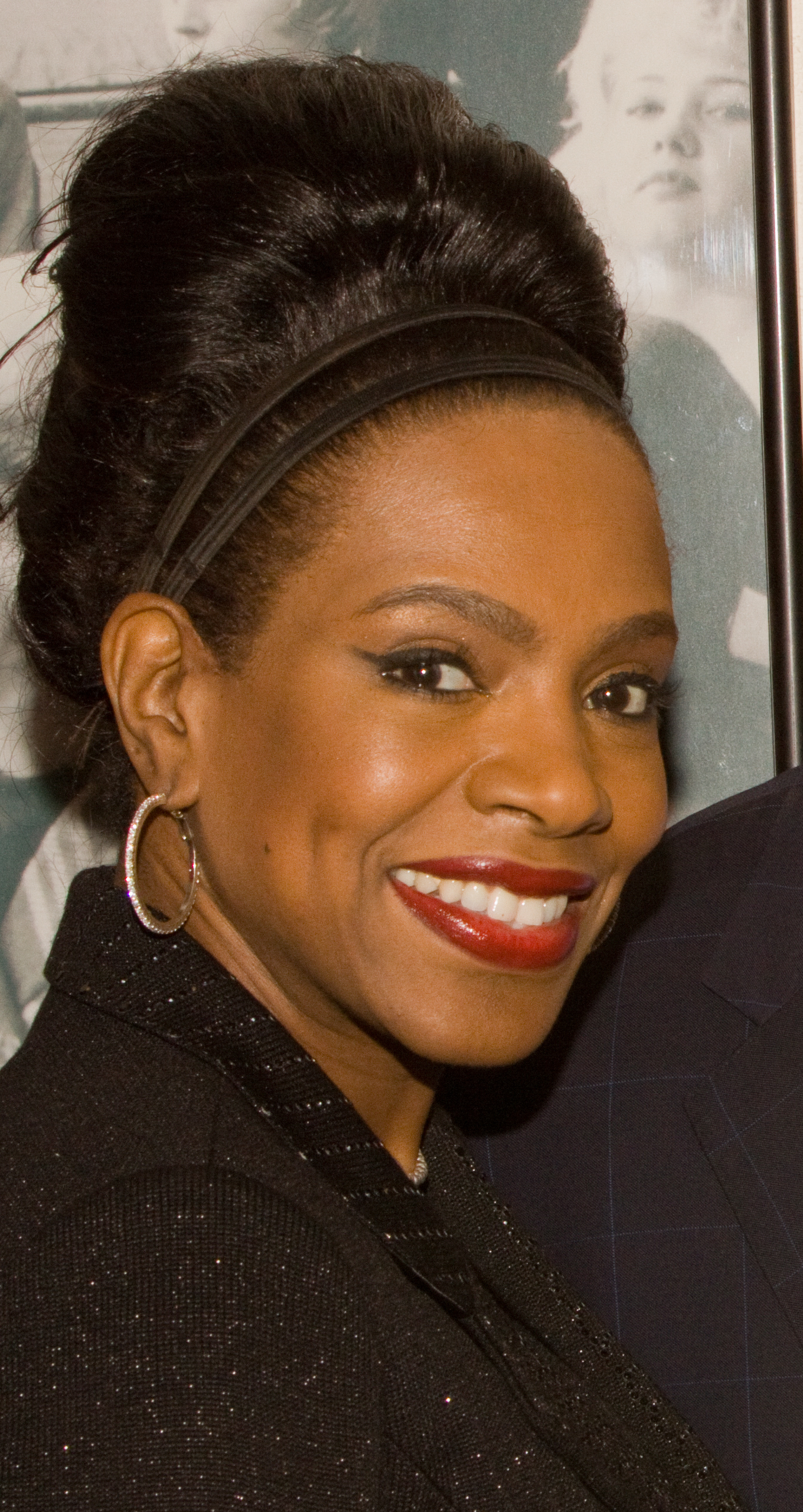
Sheryl Lee Ralph, Best Supporting Actress in a Comedy Series winner

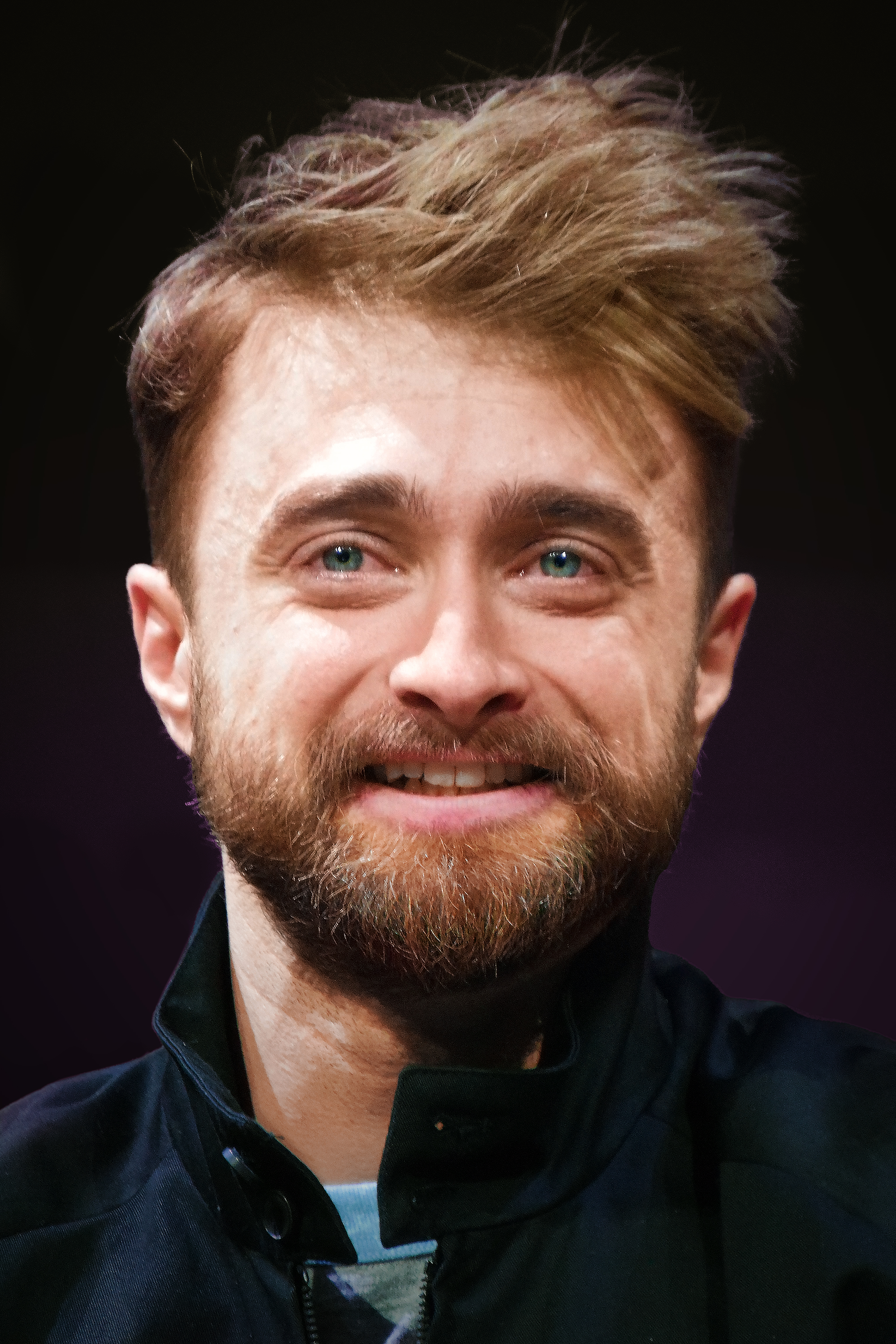
Daniel Radcliffe, Best Actor in a Limited Series or Movie Made for Television winner

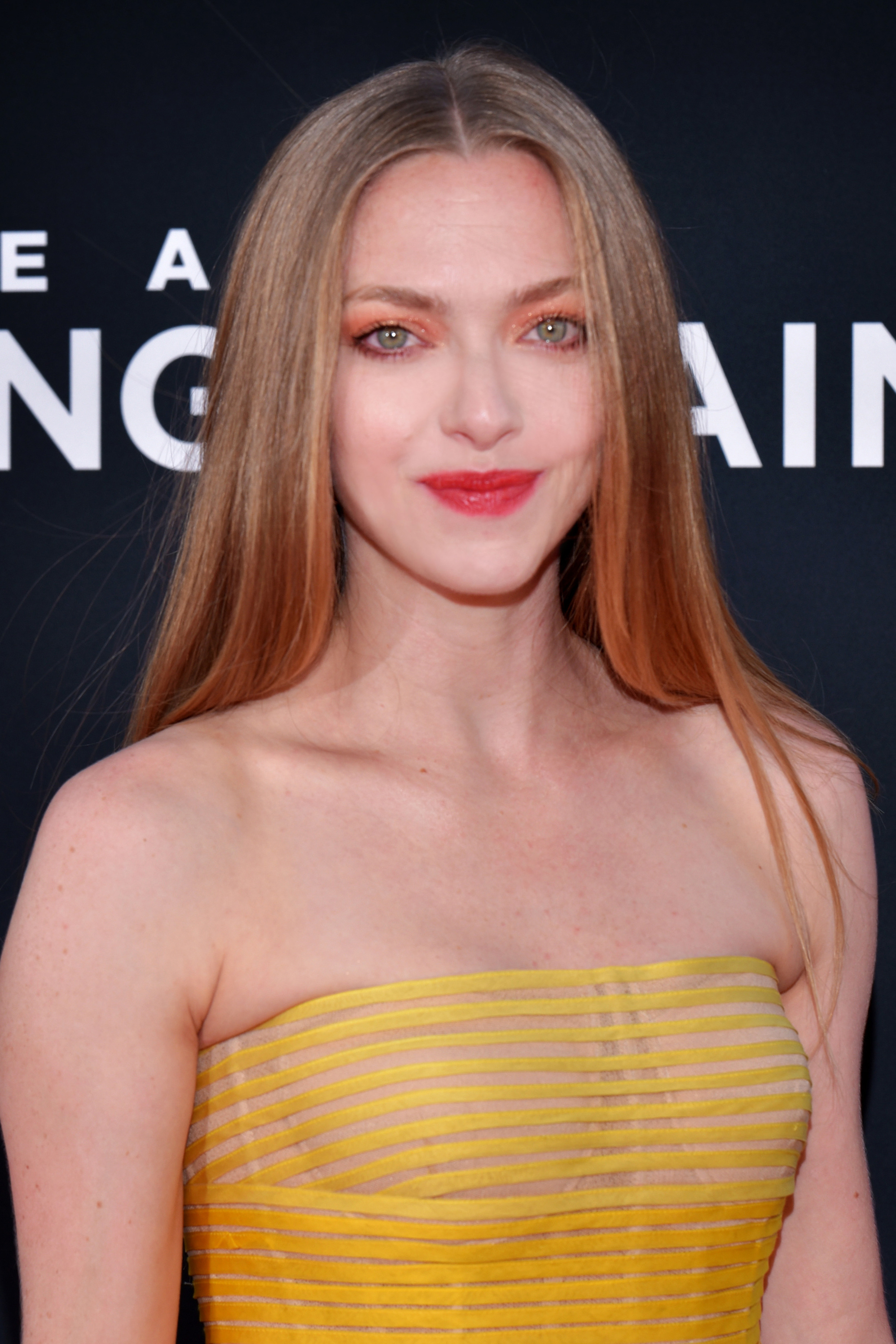
Amanda Seyfried, Best Actress in a Limited Series or Movie Made for Television winner

Paul Walter Hauser, Best Supporting Actor in a Limited Series or Movie Made for Television winner

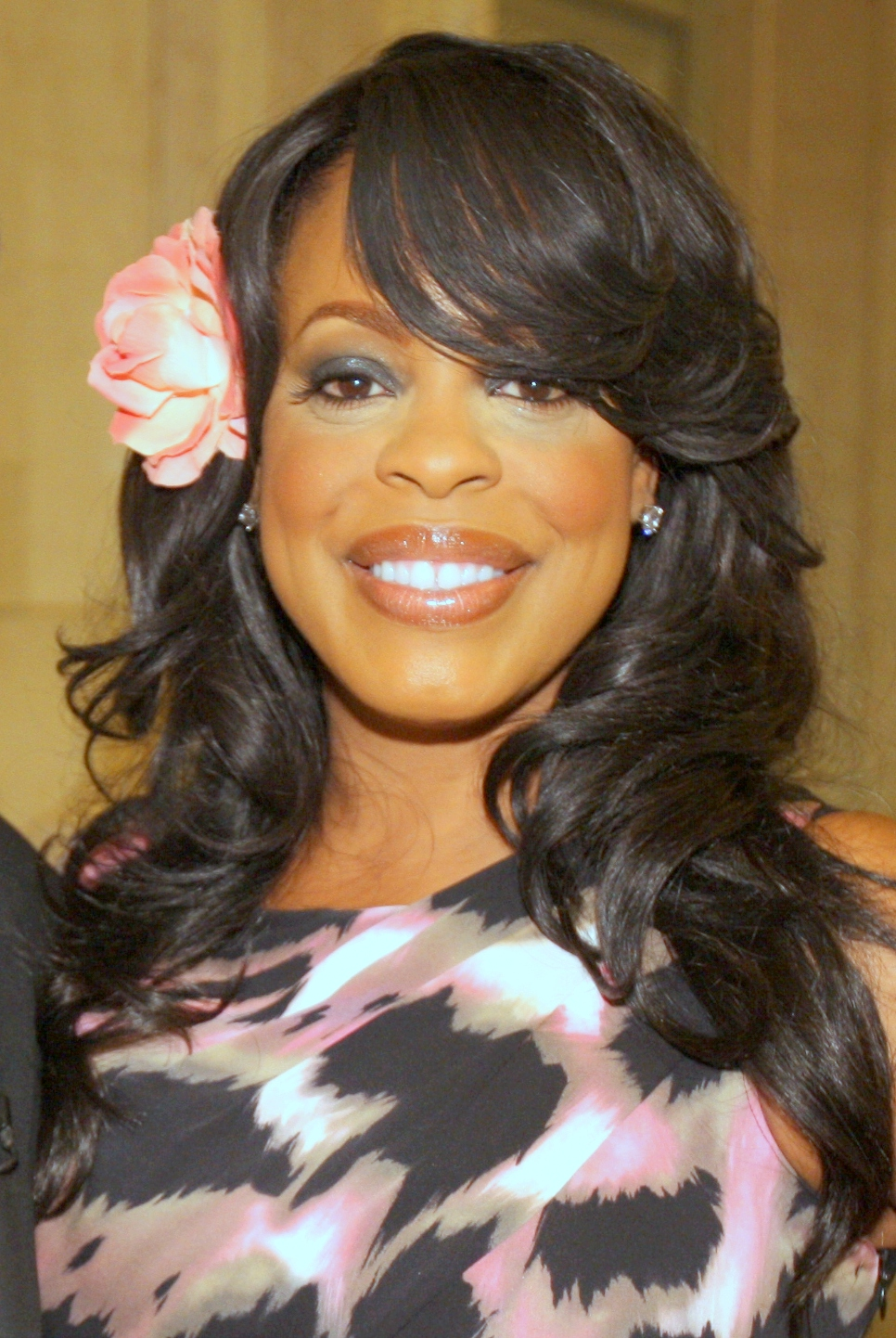
Niecy Nash-Betts, Best Supporting Actress in a Limited Series or Movie Made for Television winner

Best Drama Series: Better Call Saul (AMC); Andor (Disney+) (Note: Won for Best Science Fiction/Fantasy Series, Limited Series, or Made-for-TV Movie at the 3rd Critics' Choice Super Awards (Tied with Stranger Things)); Bad Sisters (Apple TV+); The Crown (Netflix); Euphoria (HBO); The Good Fight (Paramount+); House of the Dragon (HBO) (Note: Nominated for Best Science Fiction/Fantasy Series, Limited Series, or Made-for-TV Movie at the 3rd Critics' Choice Super Awards); Severance (Apple TV+); Yellowstone (Paramount Network)
Best Actor in a Drama Series: Bob Odenkirk – Better Call Saul as Jimmy McGill / Saul Goodman / Gene Takavic (AMC); Jeff Bridges – The Old Man as Dan Chase / Henry Dixon / Johnny Kohler (FX); Sterling K. Brown – This Is Us as Randall Pearson (NBC); Diego Luna – Andor as Cassian Andor (Disney+) (Note: Nominated for Best Actor in a Science Fiction/Fantasy Series, Limited Series, or Made-for-TV Movie at the 3rd Critics' Choice Super Awards); Adam Scott – Severance as Mark Scout (Apple TV+) (Note: Won for Best Actor in a Science Fiction/Fantasy Series, Limited Series, or Made-for-TV Movie at the 3rd Critics' Choice Super Awards); Antony Starr – The Boys as Homelander (Prime Video) (Note: Won for Best Actor in a Superhero Series, Limited Series, or Made-for-TV Movie at the 3rd Critics' Choice Super Awards) (Note: Won for Best Villain in a Series, Limited Series, or Made-for-TV Movie at the 3rd Critics' Choice Super Awards)	Best Actress in a Drama Series: Zendaya – Euphoria as Rue Bennett (HBO); Christine Baranski – The Good Fight as Diane Lockhart (Paramount+); Sharon Horgan – Bad Sisters as Eva Garvey (Apple TV+); Laura Linney – Ozark as Wendy Byrde (Netflix); Mandy Moore – This Is Us as Rebecca Pearson (NBC); Kelly Reilly – Yellowstone as Beth Dutton (Paramount Network) (Note: Nominated for Best Actress in an Action Series, Limited Series, or Made-for-TV Movie at the 3rd Critics' Choice Super Awards)
Best Supporting Actor in a Drama Series: Giancarlo Esposito – Better Call Saul as Gus Fring (AMC); Andre Braugher – The Good Fight as Ri'Chard Lane (Paramount+); Ismael Cruz Córdova – The Lord of the Rings: The Rings of Power as Arondir (Prime Video); Michael Emerson – Evil as Dr. Leland Townsend (Paramount+) (Note: Nominated for Best Villain in a Series at the 2nd Critics' Choice Super Awards) (Note: Nominated for Best Villain in a Series, Limited Series, or Made-for-TV Movie at the 3rd Critics' Choice Super Awards); John Lithgow – The Old Man as Harold Harper (FX); Matt Smith – House of the Dragon as Prince Daemon Targaryen (HBO)	Best Supporting Actress in a Drama Series: Jennifer Coolidge – The White Lotus as Tanya McQuoid-Hunt (HBO); Milly Alcock – House of the Dragon as Young Princess Rhaenyra Targaryen (HBO) (Note: Nominated for Best Actress in a Science Fiction/Fantasy Series, Limited Series, or Made-for-TV Movie at the 3rd Critics' Choice Super Awards); Carol Burnett – Better Call Saul as Marion (AMC); Julia Garner – Ozark as Ruth Langmore (Netflix); Audra McDonald – The Good Fight as Liz Reddick (Paramount+); Rhea Seehorn – Better Call Saul as Kim Wexler (AMC)
Best Comedy Series: Abbott Elementary (ABC); Barry (HBO); The Bear (FX); Better Things (FX); Ghosts (CBS); Hacks (HBO Max); Reboot (Hulu); Reservation Dogs (FX)
Best Actor in a Comedy Series: Jeremy Allen White – The Bear as Carmen "Carmy" Berzatto (FX); Matt Berry – What We Do in the Shadows as Leslie "Laszlo" Cravensworth (FX) (Note: Nominated for Best Actor in a Horror Series, Limited Series, or Made-for-TV Movie at the 3rd Critics' Choice Super Awards); Bill Hader – Barry as Barry Berkman / Barry Block (HBO); Keegan-Michael Key – Reboot as Reed Sterling (Hulu); Steve Martin – Only Murders in the Building as Charles-Haden Savage (Hulu); D'Pharaoh Woon-A-Tai – Reservation Dogs as Bear Smallhill (FX)	Best Actress in a Comedy Series: Jean Smart – Hacks as Deborah Vance (HBO Max); Christina Applegate – Dead to Me as Jen Harding (Netflix); Quinta Brunson – Abbott Elementary as Janine Teagues (ABC); Kaley Cuoco – The Flight Attendant as Cassandra "Cassie" Bowden (HBO Max); Renée Elise Goldsberry – Girls5eva as Wickie (Peacock); Devery Jacobs – Reservation Dogs as Elora Danan Postoak (FX)
Best Supporting Actor in a Comedy Series: Henry Winkler – Barry as Gene Cousineau (HBO); Brandon Scott Jones – Ghosts as Captain Isaac Higgintoot (CBS); Leslie Jordan – Call Me Kat as Phil (Fox) (posthumous); James Marsden – Dead to Me as Ben Wood / Steve Wood (Netflix); Chris Perfetti – Abbott Elementary as Jacob Hill (ABC); Tyler James Williams – Abbott Elementary as Gregory Eddie (ABC)	Best Supporting Actress in a Comedy Series: Sheryl Lee Ralph – Abbott Elementary as Barbara Howard (ABC); Paulina Alexis – Reservation Dogs as Willie Jack (FX); Ayo Edebiri – The Bear as Sydney Adamu (FX); Marcia Gay Harden – Uncoupled as Claire Lewis (Netflix); Janelle James – Abbott Elementary as Ava Coleman (ABC); Annie Potts – Young Sheldon as Constance "Connie" Tucker (CBS)
Best Limited Series: The Dropout (Hulu); Gaslit (Starz); The Girl from Plainville (Hulu); The Offer (Paramount+); Pam & Tommy (Hulu); Station Eleven (HBO Max) (Note: Won for Best Science Fiction/Fantasy Series at the 2nd Critics' Choice Super Awards); This Is Going to Hurt (AMC+); Under the Banner of Heaven (FX)	Best Movie Made for Television: Weird: The Al Yankovic Story (The Roku Channel); Fresh (Hulu); Prey (Hulu) (Note: Nominated for Best Science Fiction/Fantasy Movie at the 3rd Critics' Choice Super Awards); Ray Donovan: The Movie (Showtime); The Survivor (HBO); Three Months (Paramount+)
Best Actor in a Limited Series or Movie Made for Television: Daniel Radcliffe – Weird: The Al Yankovic Story as "Weird Al" Yankovic (The Roku Channel); Ben Foster – The Survivor as Harry Haft (HBO); Andrew Garfield – Under the Banner of Heaven as Detective Jeb Pyre (FX); Samuel L. Jackson – The Last Days of Ptolemy Grey as Ptolemy Grey (Apple TV+); Sebastian Stan – Pam & Tommy as Tommy Lee (Hulu); Ben Whishaw – This Is Going to Hurt as Adam Kay (AMC+)	Best Actress in a Limited Series or Movie Made for Television: Amanda Seyfried – The Dropout as Elizabeth Holmes (Hulu); Julia Garner – Inventing Anna as Anna Sorokin / Anna Delvey (Netflix); Lily James – Pam & Tommy as Pamela Anderson (Hulu); Amber Midthunder – Prey as Naru (Hulu) (Note: Nominated for Best Actress in a Science Fiction/Fantasy Movie at the 3rd Critics' Choice Super Awards); Julia Roberts – Gaslit as Martha Mitchell (Starz); Michelle Pfeiffer – The First Lady as Betty Ford (Showtime)
Best Supporting Actor in a Limited Series or Movie Made for Television: Paul Walter Hauser – Black Bird as Larry Hall (Apple TV+); Murray Bartlett – Welcome to Chippendales as Nick De Noia (Hulu); Domhnall Gleeson – The Patient as Sam Fortner (FX); Matthew Goode – The Offer as Robert Evans (Paramount+); Ray Liotta – Black Bird as James "Big Jim" Keene (Apple TV+) (posthumous); Shea Whigham – Gaslit as G. Gordon Liddy (Starz)	Best Supporting Actress in a Limited Series or Movie Made for Television: Niecy Nash-Betts – Dahmer – Monster: The Jeffrey Dahmer Story as Glenda Cleveland (Netflix) (Note: Nominated for Best Actress in a Horror Series, Limited Series, or Made-for-TV Movie at the 3rd Critics' Choice Super Awards); Claire Danes – Fleishman Is in Trouble as Rachel Fleishman (FX); Dominique Fishback – The Last Days of Ptolemy Grey as Robyn (Apple TV+); Betty Gilpin – Gaslit as Mo Dean (Starz); Melanie Lynskey – Candy as Betty Gore (Hulu); Juno Temple – The Offer as Bettye McCartt (Paramount+)
Best Animated Series: Harley Quinn (HBO Max); Bluey (Disney+); Bob's Burgers (Fox); Genndy Tartakovsky's Primal (Adult Swim); Star Trek: Lower Decks (Paramount+); Undone (Prime Video)	Best Foreign Language Series: Pachinko (Apple TV+) • United States; 1899 (Netflix) • Germany; Borgen (Netflix) • Denmark; Extraordinary Attorney Woo (Netflix) • South Korea; ¡García! (HBO Max) • Spain; The Kingdom Exodus (MUBI) • Denmark; Kleo (Netflix) • Germany; My Brilliant Friend (HBO) • Italy / United States; Tehran (Apple TV+) • Israel
Best Talk Show: Last Week Tonight with John Oliver (HBO); The Amber Ruffin Show (Peacock); Full Frontal with Samantha Bee (TBS); The Kelly Clarkson Show (NBC); Late Night with Seth Meyers (NBC); Watch What Happens Live with Andy Cohen (Bravo)	Best Comedy Special: Norm Macdonald: Nothing Special (Netflix) (posthumous); Fortune Feimster: Good Fortune (Netflix); Jerrod Carmichael: Rothaniel (HBO); Joel Kim Booster: Psychosexual (Netflix); Nikki Glaser: Good Clean Filth (HBO); Would It Kill You to Laugh? Starring Kate Berlant & John Early (Peacock)

== Films with multiple nominations and wins ==
The following nineteen films received multiple nominations:

Film	Nominations
Everything Everywhere All at Once	14
The Fabelmans	11
Babylon	9
The Banshees of Inisherin	9
Elvis	7
Tár	7
Avatar: The Way of Water	6
Black Panther: Wakanda Forever	6
Glass Onion: A Knives Out Mystery	6
Top Gun: Maverick	6
Women Talking	6
RRR	5
The Whale	4
The Woman King	4
Aftersun	3
The Batman	3
Guillermo del Toro's Pinocchio	3
Living	2
Till	2

The following five films received multiple awards:

Film	Awards
Everything Everywhere All at Once	5
Black Panther: Wakanda Forever	2
Glass Onion: A Knives Out Mystery	2
RRR	2
Tár	2

== Television programs with multiple nominations and wins ==
The following thirty programs received multiple nominations:

Program	Network	Category	Nominations
Abbott Elementary	ABC	Comedy	6
Better Call Saul	AMC	Drama	5
Gaslit	Starz	Limited	4
The Good Fight	Paramount+	Drama	4
Reservation Dogs	FX	Comedy	4
Barry	HBO	Comedy	3
The Bear	FX	Comedy	3
House of the Dragon	HBO	Drama	3
The Offer	Paramount+	Limited	3
Pam & Tommy	Hulu	Limited	3
Andor	Disney+	Drama	2
Bad Sisters	Apple TV+	Drama	2
Black Bird	Apple TV+	Limited	2
Dead to Me	Netflix	Comedy	2
The Dropout	Hulu	Limited	2
Euphoria	HBO	Drama	2
Ghosts	CBS	Comedy	2
Hacks	HBO Max	Comedy	2
The Last Days of Ptolemy Grey	Apple TV+	Limited	2
The Old Man	FX	Drama	2
Ozark	Netflix	Drama	2
Prey	Hulu	Movie	2
Reboot	Hulu	Comedy	2
Severance	Apple TV+	Drama	2
The Survivor	HBO	Movie	2
This Is Going to Hurt	AMC+	Limited	2
This Is Us	NBC	Drama	2
Under the Banner of Heaven	FX	Limited	2
Weird: The Al Yankovic Story	The Roku Channel	Movie	2
Yellowstone	Paramount Network	Drama	2

The following four programs received multiple awards:

Program	Network	Category	Awards
Better Call Saul	AMC	Drama	3
Abbott Elementary	ABC	Comedy	2
The Dropout	Hulu	Limited	2
Weird: The Al Yankovic Story	The Roku Channel	Movie	2

== Presenters ==
Name(s)	Role
Anya Taylor-Joy; Miles Teller	Presented the award for Best Actress in a Limited Series or Movie Made for Television
Henry Golding	Presented the award for Best Foreign Language Film
Quinta Brunson; Sarah Hyland	Presented the awards for Best Supporting Actor in a Drama Series and Best Supporting Actress in a Drama Series
Ayo Edebiri; Ebon Moss-Bachrach; Jeremy Allen White	Presented the awards for Best Supporting Actor in a Limited Series or Movie Made for Television and Best Supporting Actress in a Limited Series or Movie Made for Television
Eve Hewson; Sharon Horgan	Presented the awards for Best Supporting Actor in a Comedy Series and Best Supporting Actress in a Comedy Series
Kate Hudson	Presented the #SeeHer Award to honoree Janelle Monáe
Aubrey Plaza	Presented the award for Best Supporting Actor
Troy Kotsur	Presented the award for Best Supporting Actress
Courtney B. Vance	Presented the award for Best Actor in a Limited Series or Movie Made for Television
Jude Hill	Presented the award for Best Animated Feature
John Goodman	Presented the Lifetime Achievement Award to honoree Jeff Bridges
Benjamin Bratt; Natasha Lyonne	Presented the award for Best Actor in a Comedy Series
Cedric the Entertainer	Presented the award for Best Actress in a Comedy Series
Seth Rogen	Presented the award for Best Comedy Series
Phoebe Dynevor	Presented the award for Best Actor in a Drama Series
Daisy Edgar-Jones; Elle Fanning	Presented the award for Best Actress in a Drama Series
Kerry Washington	Presented the award for Best Drama Series
Misha Collins; Tyler Hoechlin; Elizabeth Tulloch	Presented the award for Best Limited Series
Diego Luna	Presented the award for Best Director
Angela Bassett	Presented the award for Best Actor
Ben Stiller	Presented the award for Best Actress
Chelsea Handler	Presented the award for Best Picture

== See also ==
- 2nd Critics' Choice Super Awards
- 3rd Critics' Choice Super Awards
- 7th Critics' Choice Documentary Awards
