= Friendship (2024 film) =

2024 film by Andrew DeYoung

- Theatrical release poster
- Directed by: Andrew DeYoung
- Written by: Andrew DeYoung
- Produced by: Raphael Margules; J. D. Lifshitz; Johnny Holland; Nick Weidenfeld
- Starring: Tim Robinson; Kate Mara; Jack Dylan Grazer; Paul Rudd
- Cinematography: Andy Rydzewski
- Edited by: Sophie Corra
- Music by: Keegan DeWitt
- Production companies: Fifth Season; BoulderLight Pictures
- Distributed by: A24 (United States and Canada); Republic Pictures (through Paramount Pictures; International)
- Release dates: September 8, 2024 (TIFF); May 9, 2025 (United States)
- Running time: 101 minutes
- Country: United States
- Language: English
- Box office: $17 million

Friendship is a 2024 American black comedy film written and directed by Andrew DeYoung in his feature directorial debut. It stars Tim Robinson, Kate Mara, Jack Dylan Grazer, and Paul Rudd. The story follows Craig, a socially awkward marketing executive, and his increasingly fraught bond with his new neighbor, Austin, a local TV meteorologist.

The film premiered at the Toronto International Film Festival on September 8, 2024, in the Midnight Madness program, and was released in the United States by A24 with a limited opening on May 9, 2025, before a wide release on May 23, 2025. The film received generally positive reviews and grossed $17 million.

== Plot ==
Craig Waterman, a marketing executive in the city of Clovis, New Mexico, is preparing to sell his family home alongside his wife, Tami. Recently recovered from cancer, Tami is frustrated with Craig's emotional unavailability and his lack of interest in her flower business so she has rekindled a relationship with her ex-boyfriend, Devon, to keep from feeling lonely. The new neighbor, Austin Carmichael, a quirky local meteorologist, drops off a gift to Tami to introduce himself. Austin invites Craig over for a beer that evening, which Tami accepts on Craig's behalf; Craig reluctantly agrees.

During their first hangout, Craig and Austin strike up an unexpected friendship, bonding over music, work frustrations, and a shared sense of restlessness. That night, Austin shows Craig a hidden tunnel system beneath Clovis City Hall, and they explore it together. Craig introduces Austin to his personal mantra "just ask", a philosophy that inspires Austin to pursue his longtime dream of becoming the town's daytime weatherman.

The next day, Austin calls Craig at work and convinces him to play hooky to go mushroom hunting in a nearby bog. On the way back, they pass a yellow sports car, and Austin says that if he ever buys one, Craig will be the first to ride in it. As their bond strengthens, Craig becomes increasingly infatuated with Austin, especially after Craig and Tami attend one of Austin's punk rock shows. Energized by the connection, Craig becomes a more attentive husband, father, and coworker.

Cracks begin to form after Austin invites Craig to a hangout with a group of his friends. Initially cordial, the evening takes a turn when Craig, feeling insecure and desperate to fit in, escalates a friendly boxing match with Austin by landing a cheap shot. The group recoils, and Craig responds by stuffing a bar of soap in his mouth as a bizarre act of self-punishment effectively ruining the night for everyone.

After the incident, Austin distances himself. Desperate to reconnect, Craig visits the TV station unannounced and causes Austin to stumble during his first daytime weather broadcast. Austin formally cuts ties with Craig, but Craig continues to obsess over him, breaking into Austin's home while his wife Bianca naps and inadvertently stealing a handgun from Austin's home office.

In an effort to recreate the intimacy he felt with Austin, Craig takes Tami on a manic date through the underground tunnels beneath city hall, during which Tami becomes disoriented and goes missing. After getting the police involved in the search, Craig and Austin are arrested for trespassing in the sewer previously. In jail, it is revealed Austin wears a hairpiece, a secret he begs Craig to keep. Craig's downward spiral continues — he loses a client pitch and suffers a public meltdown, resulting in his termination from the marketing firm. Tami is eventually found, shaken but safe. At her welcome-back party, Craig is shunned by Tami's friends and family, and upstaged by Devon. Tami soon moves into Devon's pool house.

Some time later, Craig attempts to rebuild his life by working as a parking officer. He reconnects with his son, Steven, and buys Tami a van to support her flower business. The family appears to be on the mend until Craig drives past Austin's house and sees him hosting another guys' night, with the yellow sports car parked in his driveway. Overcome with jealousy, Craig storms the gathering and tries to ingratiate himself into the group, eventually holding them at gunpoint while doing so. When Austin attempts to wrestle the gun out of Craig's hands, it goes off, causing everyone to duck for cover. In the struggle, Austin's toupée once again comes off. Desperate to retain this shared secret, Craig threatens Austin's friends to stay on the ground while Austin puts his hairpiece back on.

The police arrive and Craig knocks himself unconscious while attempting to flee. In the back of the patrol car, Craig imagines an alternate version of events in which nothing went wrong during that initial group hang. Craig watches from the back of the patrol car as Austin turns and gives him a wink; Craig smiles at Austin.

== Cast ==
- Tim Robinson as Craig Waterman, a marketing executive
- Paul Rudd as Austin Carmichael, a meteorologist
- Kate Mara as Tami Waterman, Craig's wife
- Jack Dylan Grazer as Steven Waterman, Craig's son
- Josh Segarra as Devon, the ex-boyfriend of Tami
- Billy Bryk as Tony
- Jason Veasey as Zed
- Jon Glaser as Big Sam
- Eric Rahill as Mike
- Conner O'Malley as Patton
- Carmen Christopher as Jimp
- Craig Frank as Buzz
- Omar Torres as Jared
- Jacob Ming-Trent as Nathan
- Daniel London as Stan
- Whitmer Thomas as Ian
- Raphael Sbarge as Garrett
- Ivy Wolk as Jen Peyser
- Meredith Garretson as Bianca

== Production ==
In February 2024, Tim Robinson, Paul Rudd and Kate Mara joined the cast of the film, with Andrew DeYoung set to direct. In March 2024, Jack Dylan Grazer, Josh Segarra, Billy Bryk, Jason Veasey, Jon Glaser, Eric Rahill, Conner O'Malley, Carmen Christopher, Craig Frank, Omar Torres, Jacob Ming-Trent, Daniel London, Whitmer Thomas and Raphael Sbarge joined the cast. Filming occurred in Yonkers.

The role of Craig was written specifically for Robinson. Rudd's character was originally named Brian in the script. When Rudd was cast, he requested that this be changed to avoid confusion with his Anchorman character, named Brian Fantana, and personally suggested the name Austin.

== Release ==
The film had its world premiere on September 8, 2024, at the Toronto International Film Festival as part of the festival's Midnight Madness program. That same month, A24 acquired U.S. distribution rights to the film. In May 2025, Republic Pictures acquired international distribution rights to the film, with plans to release it theatrically. The film opened in the United States in a limited release on May 9, 2025, before expanding on May 23, 2025.

== Reception ==
=== Critical response ===
On the review aggregator website Rotten Tomatoes, 88% of 202 critics' reviews are positive. The website's consensus reads: "Tim Robinson expands his exquisitely painful cringe comedy style to feature length with seamless results in Friendship, a toxic bromance that'll make audiences laugh and wince in equal measure." Metacritic, which uses a weighted average, assigned the film a score of 72 out of 100, based on 43 critics, indicating "generally favorable" reviews.

Reviewers frequently highlighted DeYoung's direction and the film's uneasy tone. IndieWire noted the contrast between "cringe comedy" and "high-arthouse aesthetics" in the film's look and staging, crediting cinematographer Andy Rydzewski and editor Sophie Corra. Salon described the film's escalating social anxiety as "stressful" by design while praising Robinson's lead performance. In an interview feature, The Hollywood Reporter reported that Rudd requested his character be renamed to avoid comparisons to his roles in Anchorman (2004) and I Love You, Man (2009), a choice critics said fit the film's deadpan approach.

Hunter V Norris, Arizona's Family film critic, listed Friendship as his favorite film of 2025, writing, "Friendship has that extra sauce that doesn't just touch my heart, but goes all the way to the warm gooey center. What can I say? I guess I'm a glutton for punishment, and Tim Robinson is the head chef at a 3-star Michelin restaurant. Bon appétit!"

=== Accolades ===
At the 2024 Toronto International Film Festival, the film was second runner-up for the People's Choice Award: Midnight Madness.

Award	Date of ceremony	Category	Recipient(s)	Result	Ref.
Artios Awards	February 26, 2026	Feature: Studio or Independent: Comedy	Melissa Delizia	Nominated	
Austin Film Critics Association	December 18, 2025	Best First Film	Andrew DeYoung	Nominated	
Critics' Choice Awards	January 4, 2026	Best Comedy	Friendship	Nominated	
Film Independent Spirit Awards	February 22, 2026	Best First Screenplay	Andrew DeYoung	Nominated	
Golden Trailer Awards	May 29, 2025	Best Comedy	"Gorgeous" (A24 / GrandSon)	Won	
Guild of Music Supervisors Awards	February 28, 2026	Best Music Supervision in Low-Budget Films	Rob Lowry and Mia Riggins	Pending	
IndieWire Critics Poll	December 15, 2025	Best First Feature	Friendship	4th place	
Las Vegas Film Critics Society	December 19, 2025	Best Comedy	Friendship	Nominated	
National Board of Review	December 3, 2025	Top 10 Independent Films	Friendship	Won (Note: This award does not have a single winner, but recognizes multiple films.)	
Online Film Critics Society	January 26, 2026	Best Debut Feature	Andrew DeYoung	Nominated	
San Diego Film Critics Society	December 15, 2025	Best Comedic Performance	Tim Robinson	Nominated	
St. Louis Film Critics Association	December 14, 2025	Best First Feature	Andrew DeYoung	Nominated	
St. Louis Film Critics Association	December 14, 2025	Best Comedy Film	Friendship	Runner-up	
Toronto International Film Festival	September 15, 2024	People's Choice Award: Midnight Madness	Friendship	3rd place	
