= 3rd Gotham TV Awards =

2026 American television programming awards

- Date: June 1, 2026
- Location: Cipriani Wall Street, New York City
- Country: United States
- Presented by: The Gotham Film & Media Institute

Highlights
- Most wins: DTF St. Louis (2)
- Most nominations: Big Mistakes / Death by Lightning (4)
- Breakthrough Comedy Series: I Love LA
- Breakthrough Drama Series: Pluribus
- Outstanding Limited or Anthology Series: DTF St. Louis

The 3rd Gotham TV Awards (also known as the 2026 Gotham TV Awards), presented by the Gotham Film & Media Institute, were held on June 1, 2026, at Cipriani Wall Street in New York City.

The nominations were announced on April 28, 2026. Netflix comedy series Big Mistakes and limited series Death by Lightning led the nominations with four each, followed by Alien: Earth, Beef, DTF St. Louis, I Love LA and Pluribus, all with three each.

American film and television creators Matt Duffer and Ross Duffer, often credited as the Duffer Brothers, were honored with the Visionary Tribute.

== Winners and nominees ==
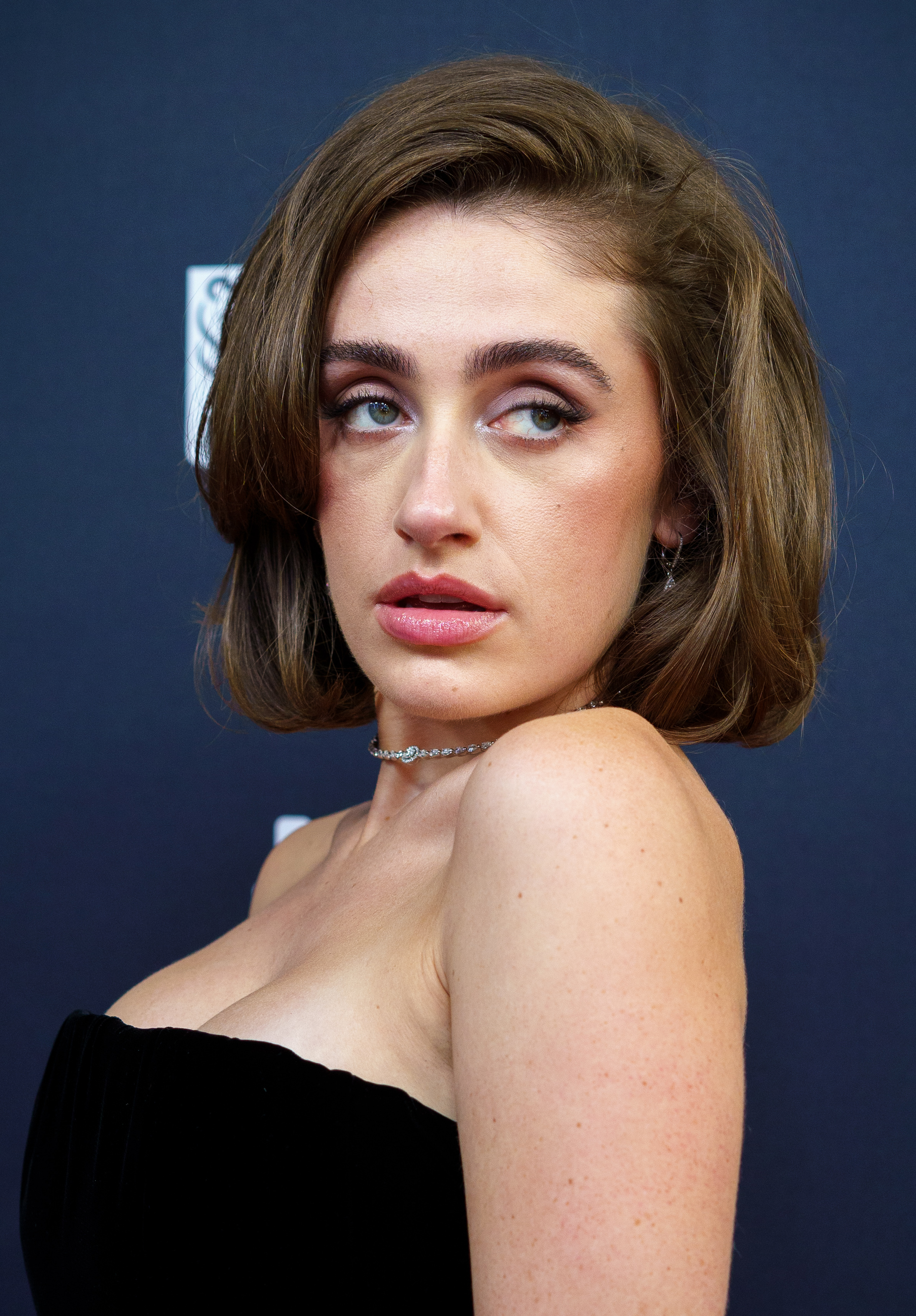
Rachel Sennott, Breakthrough Comedy Series co-winner

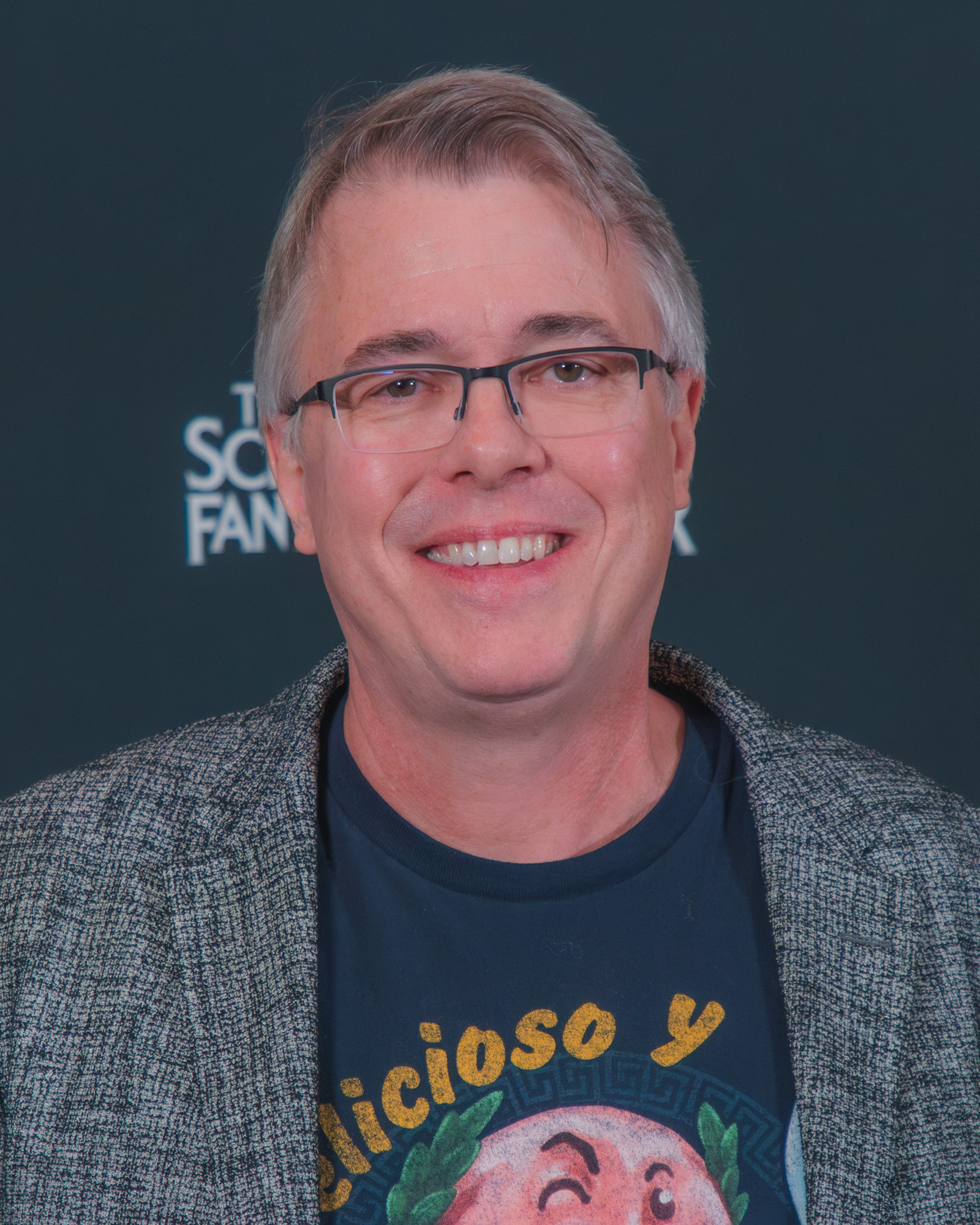
Vince Gilligan, Breakthrough Drama Series co-winner

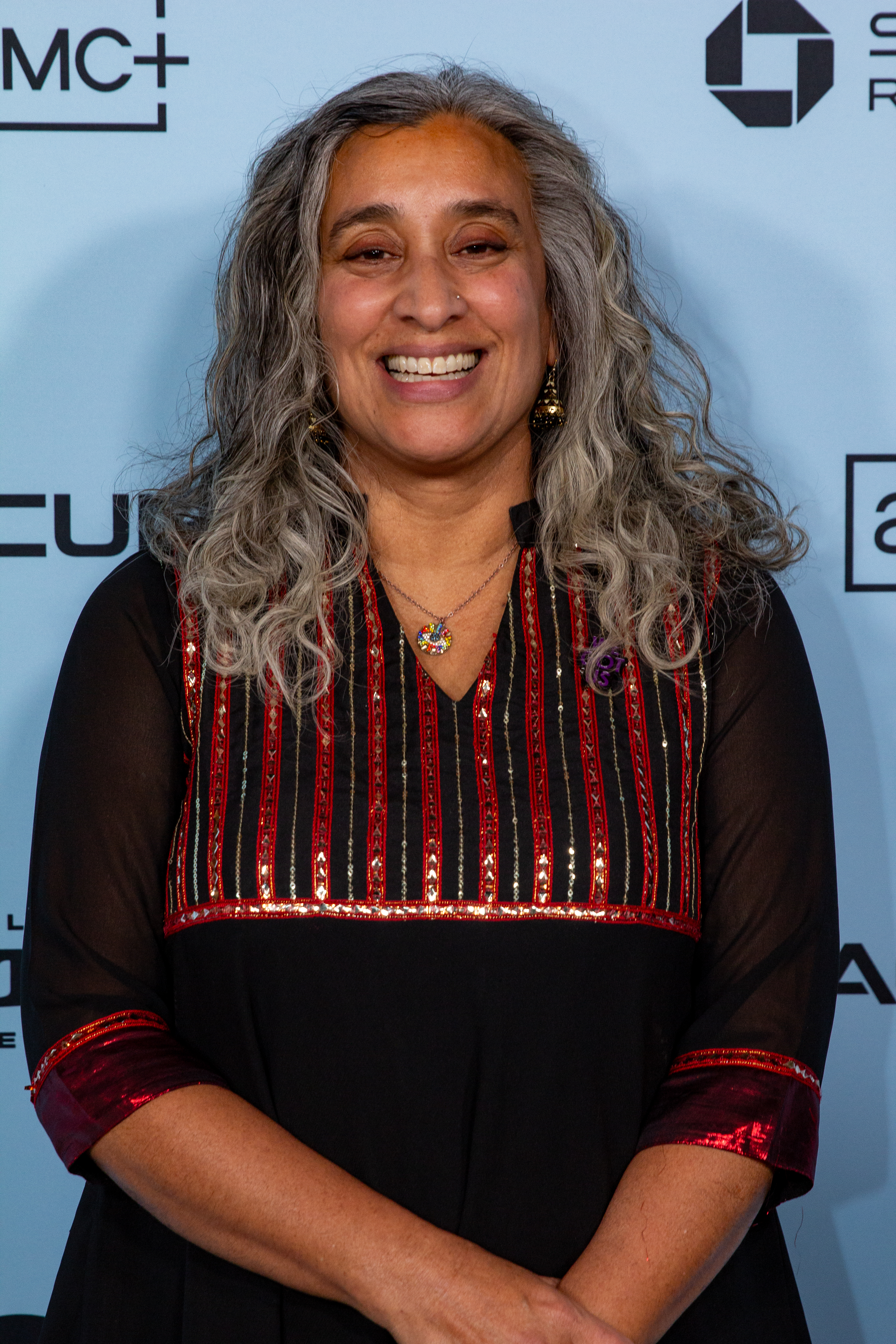
Geeta Gandbhir, Breakthrough Nonfiction Series co-winner

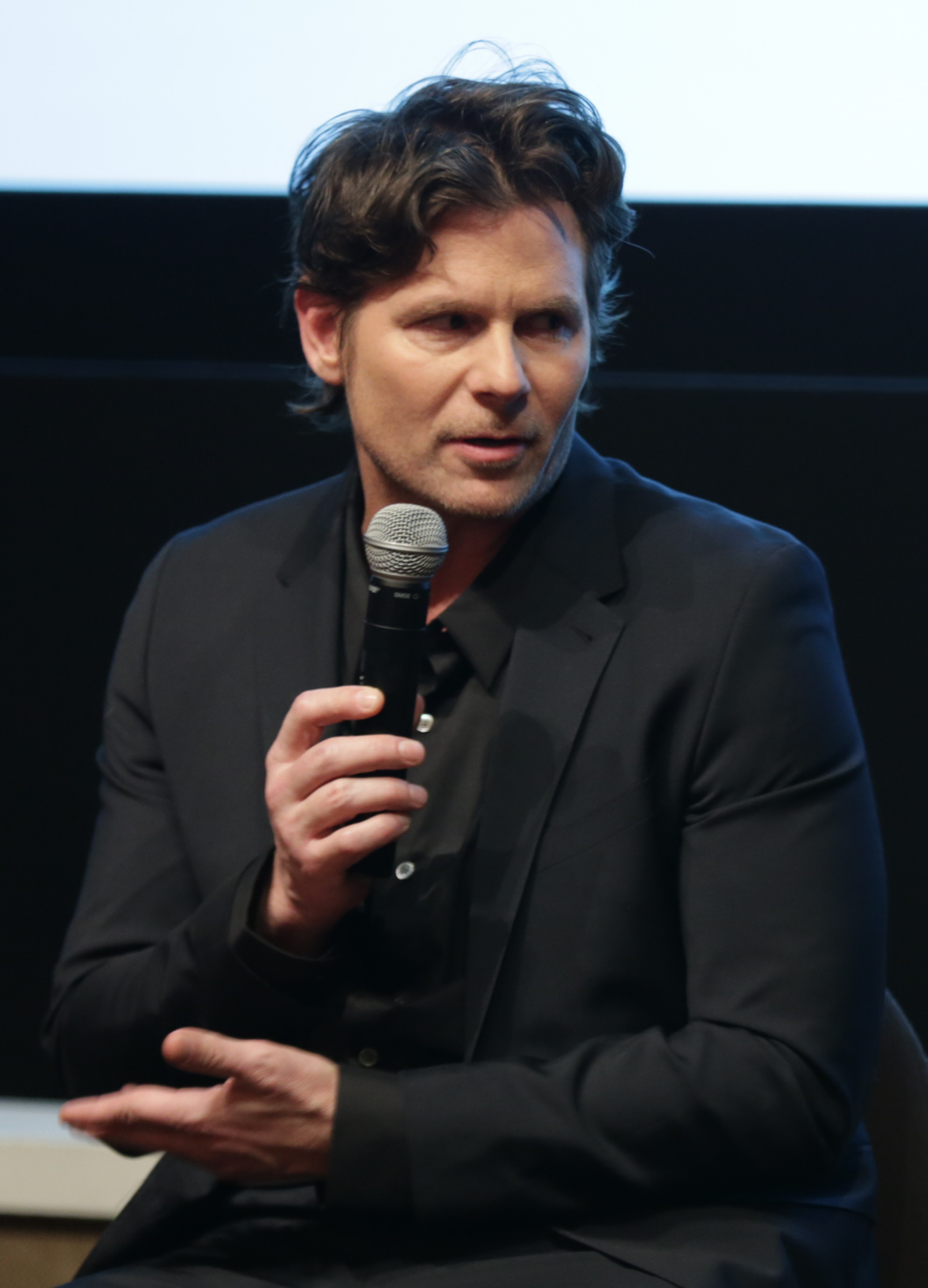
Steven Conrad, Outstanding Limited or Anthology Series co-winner

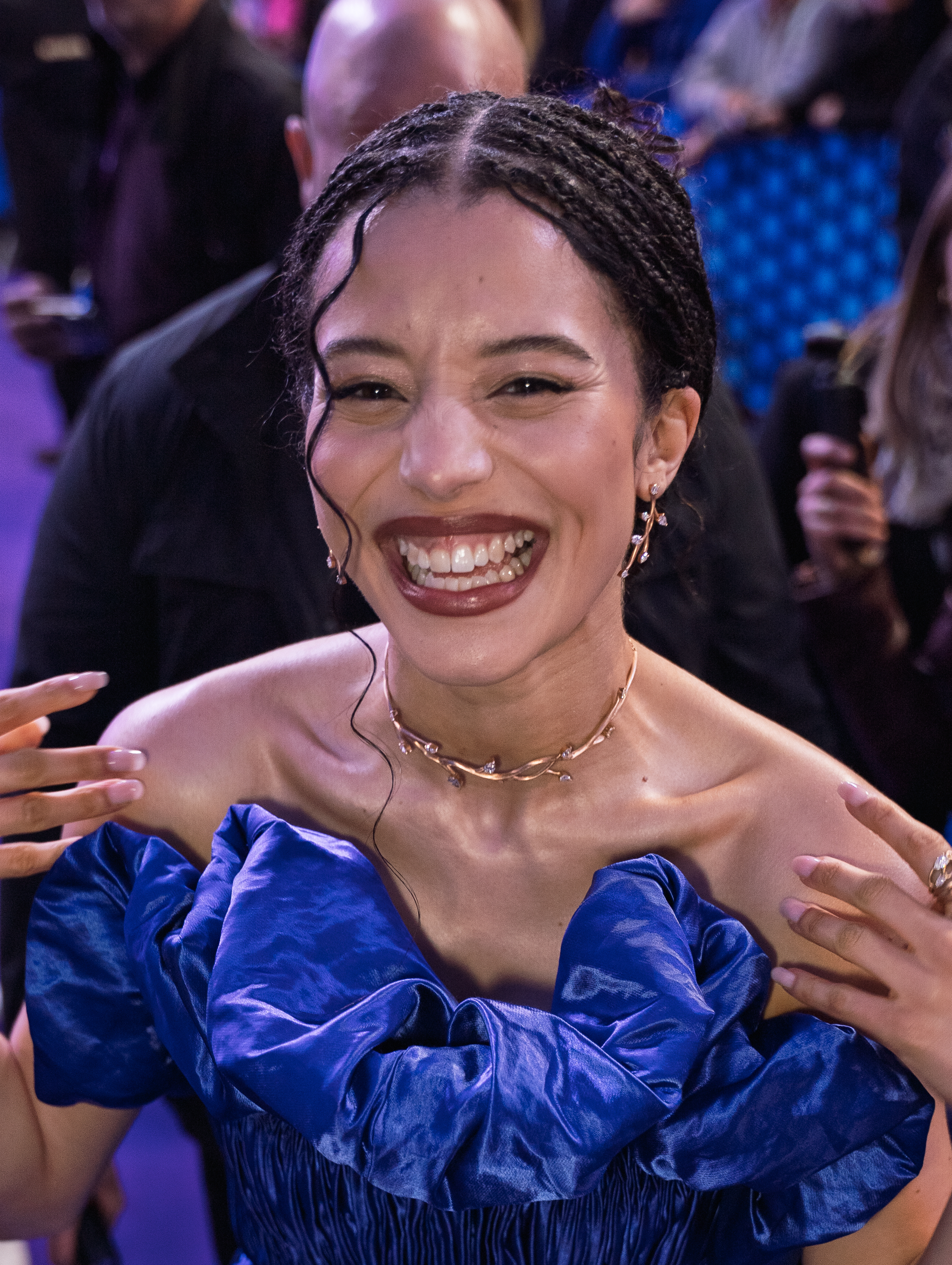
Chase Infiniti, Outstanding Lead Performance in a Drama Series winner

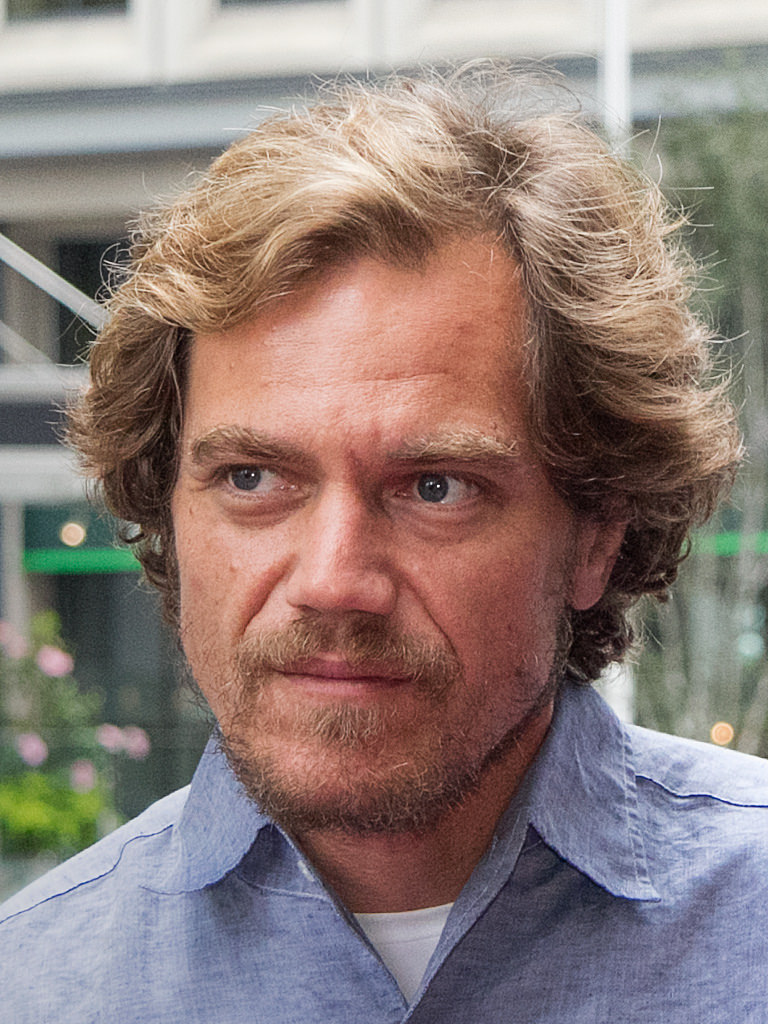
Michael Shannon, Outstanding Lead Performance in a Limited or Anthology Series winner

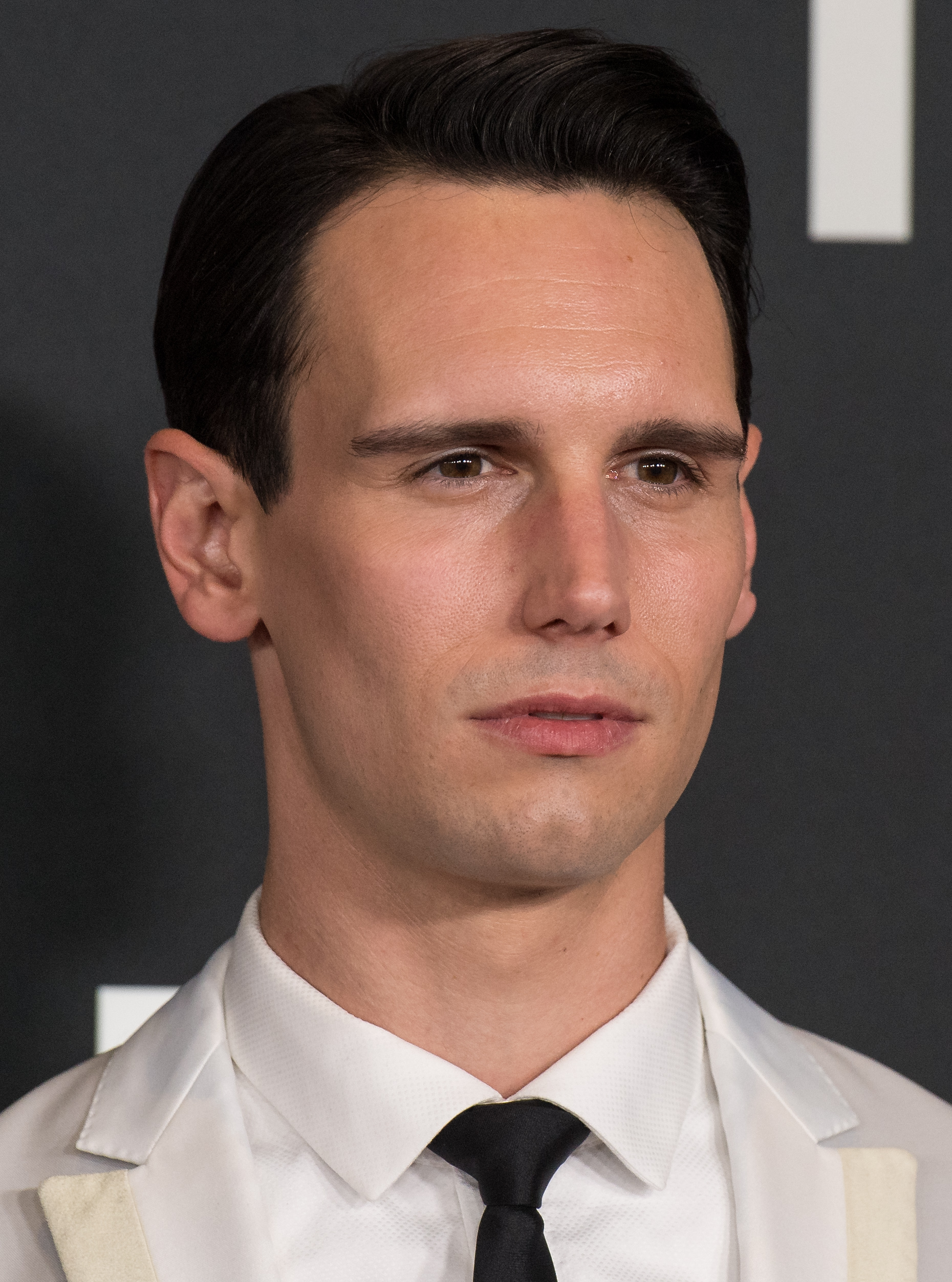
Cory Michael Smith, Outstanding Performance in an Original Film winner

=== Programs ===
| Breakthrough Comedy Series: I Love LA – Rachel Sennott, creator; Emma Barrie, Aida Rodgers, Lorene Scafaria, Rachel Sennott, Max Silvestri, executive producers (HBO Max); Big Mistakes – Dan Levy, Rachel Sennott, creators; Etan Frankel, Timothy Greenberg, Dean Holland, Dan Levy, Anne-Marie McGintee, Rachel Sennott, executive producers (Netflix); The Chair Company – Zach Kanin, Tim Robinson, creators; Andrew DeYoung, Zach Kanin, Adam McKay, Tim Robinson, Todd Schulman, Igor Srubshchik, executive producers (HBO Max); Long Story Short – Raphael Bob-Waksberg, creator; Raphael Bob-Waksberg, Noel Bright, Steven A. Cohen, executive producers (Netflix); Too Much – Lena Dunham, Luis Felber, creators; Tim Bevan, Michael P. Cohen, Lena Dunham, Eric Fellner, Surian Fletcher-Jones, Bruce Eric Kaplan, executive producers (Netflix) | Breakthrough Drama Series: Pluribus – Vince Gilligan, creator; Jeff Frost, Vince Gilligan, Diane Mercer, Allyce Ozarski, Gordon Smith, Alison Tatlock, executive producers (Apple TV); A Knight of the Seven Kingdoms – George R. R. Martin, Ira Parker, creators; Sarah Bradshaw, Ryan Condal, Vince Gerardis, Owen Harris, George R. R. Martin, Ira Parker, executive producers (HBO Max); Alien: Earth – Noah Hawley, creator; Dana Gonzales, Noah Hawley, Joseph E. Iberti, Clayton Krueger, Ridley Scott, David W. Zucker, executive producers (FX / Hulu); Dept. Q – Scott Frank, Chandni Lakhani, creators; Rob Bullock, Scott Frank, Andy Harries, Charlotte Moore, executive producers (Netflix); Task – Brad Ingelsby, creator; David Crockett, Brad Ingelsby, Paul Lee, Mark Roybal, Mark Ruffalo, Ron Schmidt, Salli Richardson-Whitfield, Jeremiah Zagar, executive producers (HBO Max) |
| Breakthrough Nonfiction Series: Katrina: Come Hell and High Water – Geeta Gandbhir, Spike Lee, Sam Pollard, executive producers (Netflix); High Horse: The Black Cowboy – Kadine Anckle, Tom Casciato, Mari Keiko Gonzalez, Sacha Jenkins, Liz Yale Marsh, Keith McQuirter, Jordan Peele, Win Rosenfeld, Keisha Senter, Jamal M. Watson, executive producers; Jason Perez, director (Peacock); Mr. Scorsese – Damon Cardasis, Chris Donnelly, Rebecca Miller, Cindy Tolan, Julie Yorn, Rick Yorn, executive producers (Apple TV); Sean Combs: The Reckoning – Brad Bernstein, Ariel Brozell, Curtis "50 Cent" Jackson, David Karabinas, Stacy Scripter, Alexandria Stapleton, executive producers (Netflix); The Yogurt Shop Murders – Nancy Abraham, Avi Belkin, Margaret Brown, Beth Garrabrant, Lisa Heller, Ali Herting, Dave McCary, Emily Osborne, Sara Rodriguez, Limor Gott Ronen, Mickey Stanley, Emma Stone, Nicole Stott, executive producers (HBO Max) | Outstanding Limited or Anthology Series: DTF St. Louis – Steven Conrad, creator; Molly Allen, Jason Bateman, Todd Black, Jason Blumenthal, Steven Conrad, Michael Costigan, David Harbour, James Lasdun, Michael Nelson, Jennifer Scher, Bruce Terris, Steve Tisch, K.C. Wenson, executive producers (HBO Max); Beef – Lee Sung Jin, creator; Sam French, Oscar Isaac, Lee Sung Jin, Ethan Kuperberg, Charles Melton, Anna Ouyang Moench, Carey Mulligan, Ravi Nandan, Alli Reich, Kitao Sakurai, Jake Schreier, Cailee Spaeny, Ali Wong, Steven Yeun, executive producers (Netflix); Death by Lightning – Mike Makowsky, creator; David Benioff, Bernadette Caulfield, Mike Makowsky, Matt Ross, D. B. Weiss, executive producers (Netflix); Half Man – Richard Gadd, creator (HBO Max); Lord of the Flies – Jack Thorne, creator; Jamie Campbell, Amanda Duthie, Nawfal Faizullah, Marc Munden, Cailah Scobie, Jack Thorne, Joel Wilson, executive producers (Netflix) |
Outstanding Original Film, Broadcast or Streaming: Reflection in a Dead Diamond – Hélène Cattet, Bruno Forzani, directors; Pierre Foulon, producer (Shudder); Color Theories by Julio Torres – Julio Torres, director; Matthew Vaughn, producer (HBO Max); People We Meet on Vacation – Brett Haley, director; Marty Bowen, Wyck Godfrey, Isaac Klausner, producers (Netflix); Remarkably Bright Creatures – Olivia Newman, director; Peter Craig, David Levine, Bryan Unkeless, producers (Netflix); #Skyking – Patricia E. Gillespie, director; Christopher G. Cowan, Patricia E. Gillespie, David Sloan, Claire Weinraub, producers (Hulu)

=== Performance ===
| Outstanding Lead Performance in a Comedy Series: Tim Robinson – The Chair Company as William Ronald Trosper (HBO Max); Elle Fanning – Margo's Got Money Troubles as Margo Millet (Apple TV); Dan Levy – Big Mistakes as Nicky (Netflix); Taylor Ortega – Big Mistakes as Morgan (Netflix); Rachel Sennott – I Love LA as Maia Simsbury (HBO Max) | Outstanding Supporting Performance in a Comedy Series: Laurie Metcalf – Big Mistakes as Linda (Netflix); Odessa A'zion – I Love LA as Tallulah Stiel (HBO Max); Erika Alexander – The Fall and Rise of Reggie Dinkins as Monica (Peacock); Michelle Pfeiffer – Margo's Got Money Troubles as Shyanne Millet (Apple TV); Daniel Radcliffe – The Fall and Rise of Reggie Dinkins as Arthur Tobin (Peacock); Haley Lu Richardson – Ponies as Twila Hasbeck (Peacock) |
| Outstanding Lead Performance in a Drama Series: Chase Infiniti – The Testaments as Agnes (Hulu); Malin Akerman – The Hunting Wives as Margo Banks (Netflix); Sydney Chandler – Alien: Earth as Wendy (FX / Hulu); Peter Claffey – A Knight of the Seven Kingdoms as Ser Duncan "Dunk" the Tall (HBO Max); Rhea Seehorn – Pluribus as Carol Sturka (Apple TV) | Outstanding Supporting Performance in a Drama Series: Babou Ceesay – Alien: Earth as Morrow (FX / Hulu); Dexter Sol Ansell – A Knight of the Seven Kingdoms as Prince Aegon "Egg" Targaryen (HBO Max); Zach Galifianakis – The Audacity as Carl Bardolph (AMC); Tom Pelphrey – Task as Robbie Prendergrast (HBO Max); Karolina Wydra – Pluribus as Zosia (Apple TV) |
| Outstanding Lead Performance in a Limited or Anthology Series: Michael Shannon – Death by Lightning as James A. Garfield (Netflix); Riz Ahmed – Bait as Shah Latif (Prime Video); Jamie Bell – Half Man as Niall Kennedy (HBO Max); Matthew Macfadyen – Death by Lightning as Charles J. Guiteau (Netflix); Carey Mulligan – Beef as Lindsay Crane-Martín (Netflix); Sarah Pidgeon – Love Story: John F. Kennedy Jr. & Carolyn Bessette as Carolyn Bessette (FX / Hulu); Lili Reinhart – Hal & Harper as Harper (Mubi) | Outstanding Supporting Performance in a Limited or Anthology Series: David Harbour – DTF St. Louis as Floyd Smernitch (HBO Max); Linda Cardellini – DTF St. Louis as Carol Love-Smernitch (HBO Max); David McKenna – Lord of the Flies as Piggy (Netflix); Nick Offerman – Death by Lightning as Chester A. Arthur (Netflix); Cailee Spaeny – Beef as Ashley (Netflix) |
Outstanding Performance in an Original Film: Cory Michael Smith – Mountainhead as Venis "Ven" Parish (HBO Max); Sally Field – Remarkably Bright Creatures as Tova (Netflix); Allison Janney – Miss You, Love You as Diane Patterson (HBO Max); Cassandra Naud – Influencers as CW (Shudder); Yannick Renier – Reflection in a Dead Diamond as John D (Shudder)

== Special awards ==
=== Ensemble Tribute ===
- Love Story: John F. Kennedy Jr. & Carolyn Bessette – Grace Gummer, Paul Anthony Kelly, Alessandro Nivola, Sarah Pidgeon, Ben Shenkman, Naomi Watts, and Constance Zimmer

=== Legend Tribute ===
- Michelle Pfeiffer

=== Performer Tribute ===
- Claire Danes

=== Spotlight Tribute ===
- Kerry Washington

=== Visionary Tribute ===
- Matt Duffer and Ross Duffer

== See also ==
- 42nd TCA Awards
- 6th Astra TV Awards
- 78th Primetime Emmy Awards
