= Big Mistakes =

American comedy television series

- Release poster
- Genre: Crime comedy
- Created by: Dan Levy; Rachel Sennott
- Starring: Dan Levy; Taylor Ortega; Laurie Metcalf; Jack Innanen; Boran Kuzum; Abby Quinn
- Country of origin: United States
- Original language: English
- No. of series: 1
- No. of episodes: 8

Production
- Executive producers: Dan Levy; Rachel Sennott; Ann-Marie McGintee; Dean Holland; Etan Frankel; Timothy Greenberg
- Running time: 31–37 minutes
- Production companies: Not a Real Production Company; Treacly Productions

Original release
- Network: Netflix
- Release: April 9, 2026 – present

Big Mistakes is a 2026 American crime comedy television series for Netflix, created by Dan Levy and Rachel Sennott. Levy also acts as showrunner and leads the cast. The series premiered on April 9, 2026. In May 2026, the series was renewed for a second season.

== Premise ==
The series is about two incompetent siblings, pastor Nicky (Dan Levy) and troublemaker Morgan (Taylor Ortega), who find themselves blackmailed by members of organized crime, following an ill-advised theft for their dying grandmother, while also dealing with their burdened mother Linda (Laurie Metcalf), and their sycophantic sister, Natalie (Abby Quinn).

== Cast ==
=== Main ===
- Dan Levy as Nicky, an openly gay pastor
- Taylor Ortega as Morgan, Nicky's sister
- Abby Quinn as Natalie, Nicky and Morgan's younger sister
- Laurie Metcalf as Linda, Nicky, Natalie, and Morgan's mother
- Boran Kuzum as Yusuf, who manages a local shipping store as a front
- Jack Innanen as Max, Morgan's boyfriend

=== Recurring ===
- Elizabeth Perkins as Annette, Max's mother
- Jacob Gutierrez as Tareq, Nicky's boyfriend
- Joe Barbara as Mike, Linda's ex-husband and Nicky, Natalie, and Morgan's father
- Mark Ivanir as Ivan
- Ilia Volok as Andrei

== Production ==
=== Development ===
The series is from Dan Levy and Rachel Sennott and was picked up by Netflix in May 2025 as part of Levy's overall deal with the streaming service. Levy also acts as showrunner and leads the cast as well as serving as executive producer alongside Rachel Sennott and Anne-Marie McGintee for Not a Real Production Company. Executive producers also include Dean Holland who directed the first two episodes, Etan Frankel, and Timothy Greenberg. Erin Levy and Jacqui Rivera also served as co-executive producers. The series underwent multiple changes during its development. The comedy was originally created by Levy and Sennott as a starring vehicle for the duo as siblings, but Sennott's HBO comedy I Love LA was picked up to series, ruling her out. A casting search led to Taylor Ortega being cast in the sister role by early March 2025, while Laurie Metcalf had already been cast.

=== Casting ===
Alongside Levy, Ortega, and Metcalf, Jack Innanen, Boran Kuzum and Abby Quinn were cast. Elizabeth Perkins, Jacob Gutierrez, Joe Barbara, Josh Fadem, and Mark Ivanir appear in recurring roles.

The show is Boran Kuzum's breakout role in English-speaking media, having already established a successful acting career in Turkey. In an interview during the show's media run, he shared that he had been a long-time fan of Levy's work in Schitt's Creek and Good Grief, describing how it felt "magical" when he got an invitation to audition via an email with Levy's name in the subject line. Though the character was initially Russian, writers changed Yusuf to be Turkish due to Kuzum's accent.

=== Filming ===
Season 2 filming at La Bella Salumeria, an Italian delicatessen in Union City, New Jersey, in October 2026

Principal photography for Season 1 began in New Jersey in August 2025. To effect the fictional New Jersey suburb of Glenview, the 46-day shoot took place in over 40 locations in the Garden State, the Harem Cabaret in Lodi; the Crystal Inn in Eatontown; and Edison Millwork & Hardware, and Adam's Fine Clothing & Tuxedo stores in New Providence, the latter of which is a family-owned business that served as the location used for Morelli's Hardware, the fictional store in the show. The Wyoming Presbyterian Church in Millburn was used for the church where Nicky serves as pastor. Deerfield School, Hatfield Swamp, the Springfield Municipal Building in Springfield, New Jersey, the Fosterfields Living Historical Farm in Morristown, Hazel Wood Cemetery in Colonia, the Union Township Police Department, and Essex County Airport in Fairfield, were also used as settings. In September 2025, filming was conducted at the Hackettstown Livestock Auction market on West Stiger Street in Hackettstown. Other towns used included Caldwell, Cranford, Franklin Lakes, Irvington, Jersey City, Warren, and Weehawken. The cartel storyline in Episode 7 was shot in San Juan, Puerto Rico, whose coastline and architecture was used to stand in for the luxurious Miami waterfront.

By September 2026, Season 2 was being filmed in Metuchen, New Jersey, at locations that included Thomas Peterson Park, and YESTERcades, a retro arcade that was transformed into Caputo’s Yarn & Crafts, a yarn store seen in the series.

== Episodes ==
No.	Title	Directed by	Written by	Original release date
1	"Get Your Nonna A Necklace"	Dean Holland	Dan Levy & Rachel Sennott	April 9, 2026
With their grandmother on death's door, two siblings, Morgan and Nicky, are forced to look for a gift for her final birthday. However, Morgan commits an ultimate act that soon comes back to bite the siblings.
2	"I Will Do ANYTHING To Survive"	Dean Holland	Story by : Dan Levy; Teleplay by : Jacqui Rivera	April 9, 2026
As Max and Morgan race against the clock to retrieve the necklace, Linda begins to stretch herself thin trying to organize the perfect family funeral for the community to help her campaign.
3	"Show Me The Money"	Adam Bernstein	Etan Frankel	April 9, 2026
Morgan and Nicky find themselves in further hot water when they return the necklace to the right owner. After receiving some news, Linda reconsiders her mayoral candidacy.
4	"Weakness Always Exposes Itself"	Adam Bernstein	Erin Levy	April 9, 2026
As Max and Morgan get personal in an intense couple's therapy, Nicky and Tareq grow closer. Linda endures a tense debate. An unexpected guest comes to dinner.
5	"James 4:17"	Colin Bucksey	Timothy Greenberg	April 9, 2026
Morgan is forced to finish a mission with Yusuf. Meanwhile, Nicky tries to fix his life. Linda and Tom, her opposition mayoral candidate, go to war.
6	"You F-ck With My Family, You F-ck With Me"	Colin Bucksey	Dan Levy	April 9, 2026
With Yusuf gone, Ivan begins to go on a warpath to find him. Linda and Tom's political feud reaches a new height. While distancing himself from Morgan and Ivan, Nicky encounters a problem with his relationship with Tareq. Morgan and Max attend a baby shower, which ends horribly.
7	"I've Really Enjoyed My Time With You"	Iain B. MacDonald	Story by : Jacqui Rivera; Teleplay by : Jacqui Rivera & Erin Levy	April 9, 2026
Morgan, Nicky, and Ivan head down to Miami where with the help of heavy narcotics, old buried emotion rise to surface. Meanwhile, Ivan quickly realizes the deal is starting to go south.
8	"Rock, Paper, Scissors"	Iain B. MacDonald	Story by : Dan Levy; Teleplay by : Etan Frankel & Timothy Greenberg	April 9, 2026
After the deadly shooting, Nicky and Morgan find themselves on the deep end as matters go from bad to worse when a surprise guest resurfaces with surprising information. Linda finds herself going toe to toe in a final battle with Tom.

== Release ==
The series premiered on April 9, 2026, on Netflix.

== Reception ==
=== Critical response ===
Metacritic review
breakdown (unweighted)

Positive
13 (57%)
Mixed
8 (35%)
Negative
2 (9%)

On the review aggregator website Rotten Tomatoes, the series holds an approval rating of 80%, based on 55 reviews, with an average rating of 7.1/10. The website's critics consensus reads: "Dan Levy and Rachel Sennott concoct a hilarious send-up of the classic family crime drama genre with witty verve, a stellar ensemble cast, and the assurance that Big Mistakes gets it right." On Metacritic, the series holds a weighted average score of 65 out of 100, based on 23 critic reviews, indicating "generally favorable" reviews.

=== Accolades ===
Award	Date of ceremony	Category	Recipient(s)	Result	Ref.
Celebration of LGBTQ+ Cinema & Television	May 30, 2026	Vanguard Award	Dan Levy	Honored	
Dorian TV Awards	August 15, 2026	Best TV Performance – Comedy	Dan Levy	Nominated	
Gotham TV Awards	June 1, 2026	Breakthrough Comedy Series	Dan Levy, Rachel Sennott, Etan Frankel, Timothy Greenberg, Dean Holland, and, Anne-Marie McGintee	Nominated	
Gotham TV Awards	June 1, 2026	Outstanding Lead Performance in a Comedy Series	Dan Levy	Nominated	
Gotham TV Awards	June 1, 2026	Outstanding Lead Performance in a Comedy Series	Taylor Ortega	Nominated	
Gotham TV Awards	June 1, 2026	Outstanding Supporting Performance in a Comedy Series	Laurie Metcalf	Won	
