= Gotham TV Award for Outstanding Performance in a Comedy Series =

Television award

- Country: United States
- Presented by: The Gotham Film & Media Institute
- First award: 2024
- Currently held by: Tim Robinson for The Chair Company (2026)

The Gotham TV Award for Outstanding Performance in a Comedy Series, presented by the Gotham Film & Media Institute, is one of the annual Gotham TV Awards and was first awarded in 2024.

== Winners and nominees ==
=== 2020s ===
Year	Winners and nominees	Program	Role	Network(s)	Ref.
2024	Harriet Dyer	Colin from Accounts	Ashley	Paramount+	
2024	Robyn Cara	Bodkin	Emmy Sizergh	Netflix	
2024	Siobhán Cullen	Bodkin	Dove Maloney	Netflix	
2024	Kaya Scodelario	The Gentlemen	Susan "Susie" Glass	Netflix	
2024	Jaz Sinclair	Gen V	Marie Moreau	Prime Video	
2024	Kristen Wiig	Palm Royale	Maxine Dellacorte-Simmons	Apple TV+	
2025	Julio Torres	Fantasmas	Himself	HBO/Max	
2025	Ted Danson	A Man on the Inside	Charles Nieuwendyk	Netflix	
2025	Anna Lambe	North of North	Siaja	Netflix	
2025	Saagar Shaikh	Deli Boys	Raj Dar	Hulu	
2025	Benito Skinner	Overcompensating	Benny	Amazon Prime Video	
2026	Tim Robinson	The Chair Company	William Ronald Trosper	HBO/Max	
2026	Elle Fanning	Margo's Got Money Troubles	Margo Millet	Apple TV	
2026	Dan Levy	Big Mistakes	Nicky	Netflix	
2026	Taylor Ortega	Big Mistakes	Morgan	Netflix	
2026	Rachel Sennott	I Love LA	Maia Simsbury	HBO/Max	
