= Abby Quinn =

American actress

- Born: 1995 or 1996 (age 30–31); Bloomfield, Michigan, U.S.
- Occupation: Actress
- Years active: 2012–present

Abby Quinn (born 1995 or 1996) is an American actress. She is known for her role in the 2023 M. Night Shyamalan horror film Knock at the Cabin.

== Early life and education ==
Quinn was born in Bloomfield, Michigan. Her parents divorced when she was young. She has played the guitar since she was seven years old.

Quinn attended Detroit Country Day School. She studied at Carnegie Mellon University in Pittsburgh from 2014-2015, before dropping out to move to Los Angeles to pursue a career in acting.

== Career ==
Quinn played Ali Jacobs in the 2017 comedy film Landline in her first major film role. She was drawn to the film's portrayal of divorce, as it was different from her own experience. The film was well-received by critics, with Ann Hornaday of The Washington Post writing, "[Jenny] Slate and Quinn are completely believable as sisters who occupy a space between twinlike closeness and alienation."

In 2018, Quinn starred as Josephine Cavallo in the film Radium Girls, alongside Joey King. The film had its world premiere at the 2018 Tribeca Festival. In October of that year, she played Kristy Esposito in the Better Call Saul season 4 finale "Winner", and was cast as Annie Moffat in the 2019 film adaptation of Little Women.

In 2019, Quinn starred as Mabel Buchman in the sitcom Mad About You, alongside Helen Hunt and Paul Reiser. In July 2022, Quinn joined the cast of the comedy horror film Hell of a Summer, alongside D'Pharaoh Woon-A-Tai, Pardis Seremi, Finn Wolfhard, Billy Bryk and Fred Hechinger, with Wolfhard and Bryk directing.

In 2023, Quinn played Adriane, one of the four intruders in the M. Night Shyamalan horror film Knock at the Cabin. The film was well-received by critics and grossed $52.1 million worldwide against a budget of $20 million.

In 2025, she was cast as a series regular on Dan Levy's Netflix series Big Mistakes, featuring Laurie Metcalf and Taylor Ortega.

== Filmography ==
Film roles
Year	Title	Role	Notes
2014	The Sisterhood of Night	Tanya	
2016	The Journey Is the Destination	Marte	
2017	Landline	Ali Jacobs	
2018	Good Girls Get High	Sam	
2018	Radium Girls	Josephine	
2018	Bumblebee	Brenda	Deleted scene
2019	After the Wedding	Grace Carlson	
2019	Little Women	Annie Moffat	
2020	Shithouse	Georgia	
2020	I'm Thinking of Ending Things	Tulsey Town Girl 3	
2022	Torn Hearts	Jordan Wilder	
2023	Knock at the Cabin	Adriane	
2023	Hell of a Summer	Claire	
2026	Crash Land	Jemma	

Television roles
Year	Title	Role	Notes
2012	Law & Order: Special Victims Unit	Hannah Webster	Episode: "Vanity's Bonfire"
2017	Black Mirror	Meryl	Episode: "Arkangel"
2018	Better Call Saul	Kristy Esposito	Episode: "Winner"
2019	Mad About You	Mabel Buchman	Main cast (season 8), 12 episodes
2026	Big Mistakes	Natalie	Main cast (season 1), 8 episodes
