= The Guyzer =

4th episode of the second season of The Office Movers

- The Office Movers episode
- Lennox (played by Drake) speaking with Everett, who is off-camera
- Episode no.: Season 2 Episode 4
- Directed by: Sebastian Cluer
- Written by: Jermaine Richards; Trevaunn Richards
- Story by: Lief Ramsaran (Note: Lief Ramsaran as the executive story editor.); Laurel Brady (Note: Laurel Brady as the story editor.)
- Cinematography by: Elad Winkler
- Editing by: Jordan Hayles
- Original air date: November 7, 2025
- Running time: 29:30 (without commercials)

Guest appearances
- Drake as Lennox; Sasha Ruddock as Cynthia; Isaac Towell as Grant; Shannon Laverty as Deb; Noah Maloney as Tyson

Episode chronology
← Previous "Immigration Situation"	Next → "Down Bad on Ramadan"

"The Guyzer" is the fourth episode of the second season of the Canadian comedy series The Office Movers. The episode premiered on Crave on November 7, 2025. The episode is notable for featuring a cameo appearance by Toronto rapper Drake, which drew widespread media coverage ahead of the season's release.

== Background ==
The Office Movers is a Crave original comedy series created by brothers Jermaine "Jae" and Trevaunn "Trey" Richards, who star as brothers Everett and Eric Saunders. Everett runs an office-moving company in Brampton, Ontario; Eric works for his company. The series is heavily based on the brothers' real-life experiences working in their father's moving business while growing up in Brampton.

The episode was directed by Sebastian Cluer, with Edward Hillier serving as first assistant director, Raymond Duff as second assistant director, and Akhil Kithani as third assistant director.

The Richards brothers have featured Drake in their prior endeavors: he appeared in their 2017 sketch series "T-Dot Goon Scrap" and later enlisted them to create a Valentine's Day promotional skit for his 2025 album Some Sexy Songs 4 U with PartyNextDoor. Drake also sampled a clip from one of the brothers' sketches in his 2017 track "Madiba Riddim".

== Plot ==
During the morning meeting, Everett sends Hassan and Eric to a thrift store to buy steel-toed boots, while Kaveh continues renovating the basement of Everett's house alongside Armond, who had briefly quit the job earlier. At the thrift store, Hassan and Eric are dismissively called "uncs" by a youth worker, prompting them to refer to themselves as "yn's," and they are approached by Zlad Johnson, the CEO of rival company Zenithon Logistics, who attempts to poach them and then covers the cost of their boots as "charity work"; Eric appears tempted by the offer, much to Hassan's confusion. Meanwhile, Shazam Office Moving arrives an hour late to a job clearing lockers, tables, and chairs from a school ahead of its scheduled demolition, showing up at 9:17 a.m. for an 8:00 a.m. start as Michael and his uncle argue. Cynthia, the project's manager and Everett's mother, is furious over the delay and reveals she has already called in Lennox (Drake) and his company, Omerta Logistics, to complete the job, remarking pointedly on Omerta's punctuality.

Doug injured after a locker falls on his foot, as Michael looks on and Hassan throws up from struggles with his boots that are too small.

Everett then goes in to speak with Cynthia directly, leading to an uneasy exchange with Lennox, who indirectly intimidates Everett by alluding to having "guys" who handle things for him. The two crews end up working the job together, during which Doug is injured after a lockers weight causes him to get two broken ankles, forcing Everett to rush him to the hospital. Concurrently, private investigator Grant visits Shazam's headquarters to question staff about the company van as part of a possible insurance fraud investigation; Carla calls to inform Everett, who dismisses the concern. Doug's cougar girlfriend, Deb, and her son, Tyson, visit Doug after his injury. Once the job wraps, the crew returns to the warehouse, where Eric tells Everett he's resigning to join Zenithon Logistics.

== Drake's cameo ==
The episode features a cameo by Drake, filmed as part of a scene with Jae Richards' character, Everett Saunders. In the clip, Drake's character, Lennox, attempts to ask Everett whether the moving company employs not just movers, but "guys," which means connected insiders, leading to a comedic misunderstanding over the word's meaning during the scene. Drake shared the clip on Instagram the day before the season premiere.

Drake had previously returned to acting through a cameo on Lil Dicky's series Dave in 2023. He originally rose to fame as an actor on the Canadian teen drama Degrassi: The Next Generation before transitioning to a music career. Drake hadn't appeared on television since the 2019 documentary Remember Me, Toronto.

== Reception and renewal ==
The episode holds an IMDb rating of 9.5/10 based on 29 user ratings.

Ahead of the Season 2 premiere, The Office Movers was renewed for a third season by Bell Media. Justin Stockman, Vice President of Content Development and Programming at Bell Media, described the show as a "hilarious slapstick comedy" with heart, and called Drake "one of Canada's most iconic cultural ambassadors."
