= Joseph Barbara =

Joseph Barbara may refer to:

- Joseph Barbara (actor) (born 1967), American actor
- Joseph Barbara (mobster) (1905–1959), caporegime in the Buffalo crime family and host of the Apalachin meeting

== See also ==
- Joseph Barbera (1911–2006), American animator, artist, and co-founder of Hanna-Barbera
