= EJ Marcus =

American comedian and writer

- Born: February 25, 1997 (age 29); Portland, Oregon, US
- Education: Oberlin College
- Occupations: Comedian, writer, actor
- Years active: 2022–present
- Notable work: I Love LA (TV series) – staff writer

EJ Marcus is an American content creator on TikTok. He is known for character-based comedy videos posted to TikTok under the handle @ejhavingfun, and as a staff writer on the HBO comedy series I Love LA (2025).

== Early life and education ==
Marcus was born and raised in the Eastmoreland neighborhood of Portland, Oregon. He attended Oberlin College in Ohio, where he studied creative writing, and began performing stand-up comedy in his senior year. His mother is a fine art weaver and his father is a writer of TV, film, educational software, and books. Marcus' father's credit include The Tonight Show Starring Johnny Carson, Dinosaurs, Checking Out, and Teech.

== Personal life ==
Marcus is transgender. He lives in Los Angeles, California.
