= Purgatory (2026 film) =

2026 Canadian-American comedy-drama film

- Directed by: Lindsay Lanzillotta
- Written by: Christine Speer
- Produced by: Lindsay Lanzillotta; Simone Kirlew; Aldo Lanzillotta; Deniz Gumustas; Mark O’Neill; Gus Murray
- Starring: Ruby McGurrin; Abby Elliott; Lauren MacRae; John Reynolds
- Cinematography: Evelin Van Rei
- Edited by: Justin Oakey
- Music by: Andrew Staniland
- Production company: Brave Jayne Films
- Release date: September 12, 2026 (TIFF)
- Running time: 104 minutes
- Countries: Canada; United States
- Language: English

Purgatory is a comedy-drama film, directed by Lindsay Lanzillotta and slated for release in 2026. The film centres on the coming-of-age in the early 1980s of Beatrice Gravel (Ruby McGurrin), a young girl whose life is upended when her mother Marianne (Abby Elliott) leaves the family to self-actualize, leaving Beatrice and her sister Chloe (Lauren MacRae) with their father Joe (John Reynolds).

The cast also includes J. K. Simmons as Father Malone, as well as Jack Innanen, Mary Walsh, Julianne Arrieta, Marcus Ngo and Gemma Rosaria Rae in supporting roles.

== Production ==
The film, Lanzilotta's directorial debut, is a coproduction of companies from Canada and the United States. It was shot in St. John's, Newfoundland and Labrador in winter 2025.

== Release ==
The film is scheduled to premiere in the Discovery program at the 2026 Toronto International Film Festival. Additional festival appearances include https://atlanticfilmfestival.ca/2026films and the https://www.ciffcalgary.ca/films/2026/purgatory.
