= Living with Yourself =

American comedy television series

- Genre: Comedy-drama; Science fiction
- Created by: Timothy Greenberg
- Written by: Timothy Greenberg
- Directed by: Jonathan Dayton; Valerie Faris
- Starring: Paul Rudd; Aisling Bea
- Music by: Anna Meredith
- Country of origin: United States
- No. of seasons: 1
- No. of episodes: 8

Production
- Executive producers: Timothy Greenberg; Anthony Bregman; Jeff Stern; Jeffrey Blitz; Tony Hernandez; Paul Rudd; Jonathan Dayton; Valerie Faris
- Producers: Karl Frankenfield; Michael Amodio; Lilly Burns; John Skidmore
- Cinematography: Darren Lew
- Editors: Brian A. Kates; Jesse Gordon; Jennifer Lilly; Alex Minnick
- Running time: 21–35 minutes
- Production companies: Greenberg Dance Party; Dayton Faris, Inc.; Likely Story; Jax Media; Blitz Bros.

Original release
- Network: Netflix
- Release: October 18, 2019

Living with Yourself is an American science fiction comedy-drama television miniseries created by Timothy Greenberg that premiered on October 18, 2019, on Netflix. The series stars Paul Rudd and Aisling Bea. Rudd also serves as an executive producer, alongside Greenberg, Anthony Bregman, Jeff Stern, Tony Hernandez, Jonathan Dayton, Valerie Faris, and Jeffrey Blitz.

== Synopsis ==
Living with Yourself follows the story of a man who, after undergoing a mysterious treatment that promises him the allure of a better life, discovers that he has been replaced by a cloned version of himself.

== Cast and characters ==
=== Main ===
- Paul Rudd as Miles Elliot, a copywriter at Pool Branding who is unhappy with his life, and his more optimistic clone.
- Aisling Bea as Kate Elliot, Miles's wife, an interior architect.

=== Recurring ===
- Alia Shawkat as Maia, Miles's younger half-sister
- Desmin Borges as Dan, Miles's co-worker
- Karen Pittman as Lenore Pool, Miles's boss
- Zoë Chao as Kaylyn, a receptionist at Pool Branding
- Rob Yang as Left / Yongsu, a Top Happy Spa employee
- James Seol as Right / Jung-Ho, a Top Happy Spa employee

=== Guest ===
- Jon Glaser as Henry
- Emily Young as Mousy Co-Worker
- Eden Malyn as Margaret
- Ginger Gonzaga as Meg, Kate's business partner
- Gabrielle Reid as Branding Co-worker
- Gene Jones as Farmer Ray
- Zach Cherry as Hugh
- Bridget Everett as Weinrod
- Peter Grosz as Da8er CEO
- Jerry Adler as Mr. Hillston
- Tom Brady as himself

== Episodes ==
No.	Title	Directed by	Written by	Original release date
1	"The Best You Can Be"	Jonathan Dayton & Valerie Faris	Timothy Greenberg	October 18, 2019
Miles Elliot is a copywriter at Pool Branding who lives an ordinary and routine life with his wife, Kate. His job is not going well, and he and Kate are struggling to conceive. A co-worker, Dan, tells Miles he can improve his life by going to a spa called Top Happy Spa. Despite not knowing what the spa involves, Miles decides to take a risk and spends all of his family's savings on a visit. Hours later, Miles wakes up buried in a forest, digs his way out and tries to return home. At home, he finds another version of him. After a small scuffle, the two confused Miles decide to return to the spa, which was the site of his last memory before the grave. There, Miles discovers that he has been cloned.
2	"Made in a Strip Mall"	Jonathan Dayton & Valerie Faris	Timothy Greenberg	October 18, 2019
After waking up in the Spa, New Miles, not knowing he is a clone, feels strange but happy. At work, his coworkers notice a positive change in him, resulting in his job proposal being universally accepted. At home, he is unusually loving and affectionate towards Kate, who likewise notices a change in him. At night, when he goes down to the living room, he bumps into his other self, the original Miles. Following an argument, they both decide to go to the Spa to find out what happened. At the Spa, Miles's clone feels overwhelmed and dissatisfied after learning the whole truth, since he knows neither why he was created nor what his purpose in life is. The original Miles tells him that he can disappear to travel the world and with no worries. The clone decides to accept the proposal, but also feels dissatisfied, since the life he wants is the one that the original Miles has.
3	"Green Tea"	Jonathan Dayton & Valerie Faris	Timothy Greenberg	October 18, 2019
After realizing that his clone had managed to fix his whole life for a moment, Miles decides to change himself to be more like his clone, which causes problems between the two. Miles begins to feel jealous of his clone, since everyone loves his clone but not him. During his presentation at Hillston Telecom, the owner of Hillston awards Miles's company the deal but realizes that the work proposal is not originally Miles's. After leaving Hillston's offices, Miles decides to go to celebrate the deal with his co-workers, but upon arriving at the Fridays bar, sees that his clone has taken his place. Deciding to face it, he reveals to his friends and Kate that there are two of him.
4	"Soul Mate"	Jonathan Dayton & Valerie Faris	Timothy Greenberg	October 18, 2019
Kate, shocked by the revelation that there are now two of Miles, lays ground rules for the both of them, which include New Miles moving into his own apartment. New Miles, who still feels married to Kate, struggles to adjust to single life and takes a sample of her hair to have a clone of her created at the spa, only for the spa employees to reject his offer, fearing what will happen if their corporate headquarters finds out. He then decides to give online dating a try, but Kate shows up as his only match.
5	"Va Bene"	Jonathan Dayton & Valerie Faris	Timothy Greenberg	October 18, 2019
Five years before Miles's cloning, Kate and Miles suffer a miscarriage. Eager to overcome what they see as a temporary setback, they move to a house in the suburbs and express their hopes and dreams of living happily ever after together. Back to the present, they have become cold, depressed and distant. The cloning day is then shown from Kate's perspective as she has a pregnancy near-miss and fed up with Miles' listlessness decides to try her hand at online dating. After a blow-up at work and a brutal rejection from Miles, she logs on to the online dating site, finds she has matched with the clone and resolutely heads out the door for a face-to-face meeting without telling Miles.
6	"Neighbors and Friends"	Jonathan Dayton & Valerie Faris	Timothy Greenberg	October 18, 2019
Miles finally goes through with his appointment at the fertility clinic. He finds that the success of the clone's ad campaign hangs on the outcome of a small-town referendum and sneaks into the meeting to gleefully watch it fail. When it becomes obvious his own fate is tied up in the success of the referendum and with the clone nowhere to be seen, he reluctantly intervenes and persuades some of the locals to vote in favor of Hillston. His ploy works, but costs him his friendship with Farmer Ray. He returns home and frantically tries to contact the clone after finding out that he hasn't gone to work all week. Just as he spots the clone approaching, someone throws a bag over his head.
7	"Piña Colada"	Jonathan Dayton & Valerie Faris	Timothy Greenberg	October 18, 2019
One week before Miles's abduction, Kate invites the clone to go with her on her business trip into the city. They sleep together, but after a few days, things become uncomfortable between them, Kate realizes she has made a mistake. The clone goes to the bar to get drunk but runs into Dan and instead decides to take him to the woods and show him what really happened that day in the spa. The next day, the clone buys an abduction kit, and just as he heads towards the house, a van drives up and two men jump out and abduct Miles. The clone walks into the house and begins to impersonate Miles.
8	"Nice Knowing You"	Jonathan Dayton & Valerie Faris	Timothy Greenberg	October 18, 2019
After he escapes being interrogated in an FDA building's lactation room, Miles returns home, only for Kate to tell him that she was intimate with New Miles. Furious, Miles races to his clone's apartment to kill him. After a brawl, they take turns destroying the credenza Miles often runs into by accident using an axe. Miles nearly smothers New Miles to death with a pillow but has a change of heart and revives him with CPR. As they reconcile, Kate arrives and tells Miles to his delight that she did not enjoy sex with New Miles. She then announces she is pregnant but that the father will never be known. The three share a group hug, excited to start a family together.

== Production ==
On February 16, 2017, it was announced that IFC had given a series greenlight to a new comedy series created by Timothy Greenberg. Executive producers for the series were expected to include Greenberg, Jeffrey Blitz, Anthony Bregman, and Jeff Stern. Blitz was also set to serve as a director and the series was slated to premiere in 2018. Production companies involved with the series were scheduled to consist of Likely Story and Jax Media.

On August 10, 2018, it was announced that the project had moved to Netflix, which had given the production a series order for a first season consisting of eight episodes. The series was set to be written by Greenberg, who was also expected to executive produce alongside Blitz, Bregman, Stern, Tony Hernandez, Jonathan Dayton, Valerie Faris, and Paul Rudd. Dayton and Faris were also anticipated to serve as directors for the series.

Alongside the announcement of the series’ move to Netflix, it was confirmed that Paul Rudd had been cast in the dual lead roles. On August 28, 2018, it was announced that Aisling Bea had joined the cast. Principal photography for the first season took place on location in New York City in 2018.

On October 18, 2019, Living With Yourself was officially released on Netflix.

== Reception ==
=== Critical response ===
On review aggregator website Rotten Tomatoes, the series holds an approval rating of 81% based on 76 critic ratings, with an average rating of 7.15/10. The website's critical consensus reads, "Strange, surreal, and surprising, Living With Yourself can't quite sustain its high-concept premise, but it remains engaging thanks to its clever writing and the sheer force of Paul Rudd's dueling performances." On Metacritic, it has a weighted average score of 70 out of 100, based on 26 critics, indicating "generally favorable reviews".

=== Accolades ===
Year	Award	Category	Recipient(s)	Result	Ref(s)
2020	Golden Globe Awards	Best Actor – Television Series Musical or Comedy	Paul Rudd	Nominated	
2020	Critics' Choice Television Awards	Best Actor in a Comedy Series	Paul Rudd	Nominated	
2020	Visual Effects Society Awards	Outstanding Supporting Visual Effects in a Photoreal Episode	Jay Worth, Jacqueline VandenBussche, Chris Wright, Tistan Zerafa (for "Nice Knowing You")	Nominated	
2020	Writers Guild of America Awards	Episodic Comedy	Timothy Greenberg (for "Nice Knowing You")	Nominated	
