= True Whitaker =

American actress (born 1998)

- Born: 1997 or 1998 (age 27–28)
- Education: New York University
- Occupation: Actress
- Years active: 2021–present
- Father: Forest Whitaker

True Whitaker is an American actress. She is best known for her role as Alani Marcus on the 2025 HBO comedy series I Love LA.

Whitaker is the daughter of actor Forest Whitaker and went to Oakwood in North Hollywood. She went to college at NYU and studied acting at the Stella Adler school.

== Personal life ==
Whitaker lives in the East Village neighborhood of New York City.

Whitaker's favorite album is Addison by Addison Rae.

== Filmography ==
=== Television ===
Year	Title	Role	Notes
2021–2025	Godfather of Harlem	Sister Sandra	7 episodes
2025–present	I Love LA	Alani Marcus	Main role
