= Hassan Phills =

Canadian stand-up comedian

- Born: Scarborough, Ontario, Canada
- Occupations: Stand-up comedian; actor; content creator
- Notable work: Eidiot Mubarak; The Office Movers

Comedy career
- Years active: 2015–present
- Genres: Storytelling; crowd work
- Subjects: Toronto; multiculturalism; identity; religion

Instagram information
- Page: Hassan Phills
- Years active: 2013–present
- Followers: 203 thousand

TikTok information
- Page: Hassan Phills
- Years active: 2020–present
- Followers: 126.2 thousand

X information
- Handle: @HassanPhills
- Display name: hassanphills
- Years active: 2012
- Followers: 1 thousand

YouTube information
- Channel: Hassan Phills
- Years active: 2024–present
- Subscribers: 5.3 thousand
- Views: 274 thousand
- Last updated: July 16, 2026
- Website: www.hassanphillslive.com

Hassan Phills is a Canadian stand-up comedian, actor, and content creator from Scarborough, Ontario. He is known for stand-up material and social media content drawing on his Jamaican and Djiboutian heritage and his upbringing in Toronto, and for creating the annual post-Ramadan comedy event Eidiot Mubarak. He's a main character in the Crave series The Office Movers and was sampled on Drake and PartyNextDoor's 2025 album Some Sexy Songs 4 U.

== Early life ==
Phills was raised in Scarborough, in Toronto's east end, in a single-parent household in government housing, and attended Bendale Business and Technical Institute. He is of Jamaican and Djiboutian descent and was raised Muslim. He moved to Vancouver to attend Capilano University, where he played basketball for the Capilano University Blues.

== Career ==
=== Beginnings ===
Phills began performing stand-up around 2015 after his manager at a Foot Locker store where he worked signed him up for an amateur night at Yuk Yuk's in Vancouver without his knowledge. He initially tried to balance comedy with university basketball before committing to comedy full-time, and gained an early opening slot on a tour by British-Jamaican comedian Harry "White Yardie" Gregory, travelling to shows in Calgary and Edmonton on borrowed money. He later left university and moved back to Toronto in late 2020.

His profile grew after a video of him joking about being asked whether he had "friends with benefits" went viral online, helping him build a following on Instagram and TikTok.

=== Eidiot Mubarak and touring ===
In 2022, Phills created Eidiot Mubarak, a post-Ramadan comedy show that began with three performances in Hamilton, Ottawa, and Toronto. The event grew from around 200 attendees in its first Toronto show to 700 at a venue in Regent Park, and by its third year in 2024 drew more than 1,200 people to the Elgin and Winter Garden Theatre Centre. He has toured extensively, including a 36-city tour titled This Tour Is Jokes across Canada, the United States, and Europe, and later announced a 44-city international tour of the same name.

In October 2025, Phills made his United Arab Emirates debut, performing at the Dubai Comedy Festival.

=== Television and music ===
Phills appears as a fictionalized version of himself, playing a security guard, in the Crave sketch/comedy series The Office Movers, created by Jermaine and Trevaunn Richards.

In February 2025, a clip of Phills' voice from one of his TikTok videos was used on the outro of "Small Town Fame", a track on Drake and PartyNextDoor's album Some Sexy Songs 4 U. Drake, who had been following Phills on social media, attended one of his shows at Comedy Bar Danforth in December 2024.

=== Recognition ===
In 2025, Phills was named to TikTok's #BlackTikTok "Voices to Watch" list, which recognizes Black content creators, entrepreneurs, and storytellers.

In 2026, Phills was named as one of the New Faces of Comedy Standups as the Just For Laughs Festival in Montreal.

== Personal life ==
Phills has described his identity as shaped by his Jamaican and Djiboutian heritage and his upbringing in Toronto, and has spoken about how his Canadian identity informs his comedy while touring internationally.

=== Advocacy ===
Phills has served as an ambassador for Muslim Welfare Canada, a Toronto-based organization that operates a food bank and long-term care facilities, using his platform to support the organization's work.

== Awards and nominations ==
=== Acting career ===
Year	Award	Category	Work	Result
2026	Canadian Screen Awards	Ensemble performance in a comedy series	The Office Movers (Note: Phills was nominated alongside other cast members.)	Nominated
