= The Office Movers =

2024 Canadian TV series

- Genre: Sitcom; Workplace comedy; Cringe comedy
- Created by: Jermaine Richards; Trevaunn Richards
- Showrunner: Clara Altimas
- Written by: Clara Altimas; Lief Ramsaran; Allana Reoch; Jermaine Richards; Trevaunn Richards
- Directed by: Sebastian Cluer; Clara Altimas
- Starring: Jermaine Richards; Trevaunn Richards; Heather Gallant; Lucas Lopez; Hassan Phills; Danny Martinello; Michael Charles; Solomon Kehinde; Zachariah "Zlam" Hamed; Andy Agyepong-Ntra; Marvin SGB; Marina Nedic; Jack Innanen; Taj Ranotta
- Music by: James Ervin; Matthew Reid; Philip J Bennett; Mark McLean
- Opening theme: "Let's Ride" by Choclair (season 1) "Money (Part 1)" by Jelleestone (season 2)
- Ending theme: Various
- Country of origin: Canada
- Original language: English
- No. of seasons: 2
- No. of episodes: 14

Production
- Executive producers: Anton Leo; Dan Bennett; Shane Corkery
- Producer: Robbie David
- Production company: Counterfeit Pictures

Original release
- Network: Crave
- Release: October 10, 2024 – present

The Office Movers is a Canadian television comedy series, which premiered on October 10, 2024, on Crave. Created by brothers Jermaine and Trevaunn Richards; they are known online as Jae and Trey, the series is based on their own experiences working for their father's moving company before pursuing content creation on YouTube. The series stars the duo as Everett and Eric Saunders, brothers in Brampton working for Shazam Office Moving, a company founded by Everett. The supporting cast includes Heather Gallant, Lucas Lopez, Hassan Phills, Danny Martinello, Michael Charles, Solomon Kehinde, and Zachariah "Zlam" Hamed.

The series began production in March 2024 in the Etobicoke district of Toronto, produced by Counterfeit Pictures and directed by Sebastian Cluer. The first season consisted of six episodes. In December 2024, Crave announced that it was renewing the series for a second season. The second season premiered on November 7, 2025, and featured the involvement of rapper Drake. The day prior to the second season premiere, Crave announced that the series was renewed for a third season.

The third season was filmed from June 30 to September 11, 2026, it will consist of 14 episodes in total: 12 regular episodes and 2 specials, each spanning 30 minutes.

== Premise ==
Set in Brampton and filmed throughout the Greater Toronto Area, (Note: Filmed mainly in Brampton and Mississauga, more specifically, some episodes are filmed in Downtown Toronto and some scenes filmed in Whitchurch-Stouffville, Downsview, and Hamilton.) The Office Movers follows Everett Saunders as he struggles to save Shazam Office Moving, the company he founded. Joining him is his brother Eric, who enters the business after being fired from his job in security.

== Cast and characters ==
=== Cast overview ===
Character	Portrayed by	Season		
Character	Portrayed by	1	2	Specials
Main characters
Everett Saunders	Jermaine Richards	Main	Main	Main
Eric Saunders	Trevaunn Richards	Main	Main	Main
Carla Morris	Heather Gallant	Main	Main	Guest
Ricardo	Lucas Lopez	Main	Main	Guest
Hassan Ahmed	Hassan Phills	Main	Main	Guest
Doug	Danny Martinello		Main	Guest
Marcus	Michael Charles	Recurring	Main	Guest
Michael	Solomon Kehinde	Recurring	Main	Guest
Kaveh	Zachariah "Zlam" Hamed		Main	
Starring characters
Cloudy	Andy Agyepong-Ntra	Starring	Starring	
Reggie	Marvin SGB	Starring	Guest	
Trisha Roosevelt	Marina Nedic	Starring	Starring	
Mike the Bike	Jack Innanen	Starring		
Naveed Kazemi	Taj Ranotta	Starring	Recurring	
Recurring characters
Tyco	Trevaunn Richards	Recurring	Recurring	
Mr. Saunders	John Phillips	Guest	Recurring	
Susan Li	Shel Sun	Recurring		
Prince	Baldeep Sehmbi	Recurring		Guest
Tiana	Tiana Dueck		Recurring	
Shamez Williams	Gervail "JR Lee" Sean Lemo		Recurring	
Zlad Johnson	Zachariah "Zlam" Hamed		Recurring	
Chrisss	Marlon Palmer		Recurring	
Armond	Lucas Lopez		Recurring	
Judge Tyco	Trevaunn Richards		Recurring	Recurring
Grant	Isaac Towell		Guest	Recurring
Deb	Shannon Laverty		Recurring	
Guest characters
Sleepy	Mike D. Smith	Guest		
Shaquille	Ryan Richards	Guest		
Denise	Kathy Rupcic	Guest		
Trini-T Dave	Tyrrell Gardner	Guest	Guest	
Trini-T Wayne	Melo Griffith	Guest		
Black Chris	Matthew Chapman	Guest		
Delivery Ryan	Ryan McQuoid		Guest	Guest
Cynthia	Sasha Ruddock		Guest	
Special guest stars
Lennox	Aubrey Graham		Special Guest Star	

=== Characters ===
==== Main characters ====
- Jermaine Richards as Everett Saunders, the main character who started Shazam Office Moving, brother of Eric Saunders, and the legal parent of Michael.
- Trevaunn Richards as Eric Saunders, one of the main characters, who began working for Shazam after being fired from his old security job.
- Heather Gallant as Carla Morris, the receptionist for Shazam.
- Lucas Lopez as Ricardo (also known as Ricky), who lives with Everett and Eric and began working for Shazam Office Moving soon after moving from Cuba; he is the son of their father's partner.
- Hassan Phills as Hassan Ahmed, who worked alongside Eric Saunders at their old security job before deciding to also work at Shazam.
- Danny Martinello as Doug, who began working for Shazam at the beginning of season two and is dating a cougar.
- Solomon Kehinde as Michael, the legal son of Everett and the biological nephew of Marcus, both of whom work at Shazam.
- Michael Charles as Marcus, the biological uncle of Michael; both of them work at Shazam.
- Zachariah "Zlam" Hamed as Kaveh, the renovator for Everett and Eric's basement.

==== Starring characters ====
- Andy Agyepong-Ntra as Cloudy, the cousin of Everett and Eric, who is close friends with Tyco.
- Marvin SGB as Reggie, the owner of a Jamaican restaurant who formerly worked for Shazam.
- Marina Nedic as Trisha Roosevelt, a project manager and friend of Everett, whom she coincidentally went to college with.
- Jack Innanen as Mike the Bike, a former worker for Shazam who is known for riding his bike everywhere.
- Taj Ranotta as Naveed Kazemi, the founder of a defunct driving school who briefly worked for Zenithon Logistics before being fired; he now works for Shazam. (Note: It is unclear whether or not Naveed was fired from Shazam after showing up twelve hours late to his first shift, as Chrisss stated that he took Naveed's job in the final episode of the second season.)

==== Recurring characters ====
- Trevaunn Richards as Tyco, a close friend of Cloudy.
- John Phillips as Mr. Saunders, the father of Everett and Eric Saunders, who is dating Ricardo's mother.
- Shel Sun as Susan Li, a representative for Zenithon Logistics during Everett's attempt to sell Shazam.
- Baldeep Sehmbi as Prince, a vehicle reseller suspected of obtaining cars illegally.
- Tiana Dueck as Tiana, the assistant to Trisha Roosevelt.
- Gervail "JR Lee" Sean Lemo as Shamez Williams, the building owner of Shazam's headquarters and founder of Belmont Bass.
- Zachariah "Zlam" Hamed as Zlad Johnson, the CEO of Zenithon Logistics and son of its founder.
- Marlon Palmer as Chrisss, Carla's Jamaican boyfriend, who works at Shazam.
- Lucas Lopez as Armond, who assists Kaveh in renovating Everett and Eric's basement.
- Trevaunn Richards as Judge Tyco, a judge at an Ontario Court of Justice.
- Isaac Towell as Grant, an insurance fraud investigator.
- Shannon Laverty as Deb, a cougar and Doug's girlfriend.

==== Guest characters ====
- Mike D. Smith as Sleepy, a former worker for Shazam.
- Ryan Richards as Shaquille, a former worker for Shazam.
- Kathy Rupcic as Denise, a former client of Shazam.
- Tyrrell Gardner as Trini-T Dave, the founder of Trini-T Moving, who now works at Zenithon Logistics.
- Melo Griffith as Trini-T Wayne, a former worker at Trini-T Moving.
- Matthew Chapman as Black Chris, a former worker for Shazam.
- Ryan McQuoid as Delivery Ryan, a delivery driver dealing with back pain.
- Sasha Ruddock as Cynthia, the mother of Everett and Eric Saunders and former wife of Mr. Saunders; she is presumed to be the director of a school and/or renovation plan.

==== Special guest stars ====
- Aubrey Graham as Lennox, the founder of a rival moving company: Omerta Logistics.

== Episodes ==
=== Series overview ===
Season	Episodes	Originally released	
Season	Episodes	First released	Last released
1	6	October 10, 2024	October 24, 2024
2	6	November 7, 2025	
Specials	2	December 19, 2025	February 20, 2026
3	12	TBA	
Specials	2	TBA	

=== Season 1 (2024) ===
No. overall	No. in season	Title	Directed by	Written by	Original release date
1	1	"Familia"	Sebastian Cluer	Jermaine Richards & Trevaunn Richards	October 10, 2024
2	2	"Not in Front of The Client"	Sebastian Cluer	Jermaine Richards, Trevaunn Richards & Clara Altimas	October 10, 2024
3	3	"Pop-Up"	Sebastian Cluer	Jermaine Richards, Trevaunn Richards, Lief Ramsaran & Allana Reoch	October 17, 2024
4	4	"Trini-T Moving"	Sebastian Cluer	Jermaine Richards, Trevaunn Richards & Clara Altimas	October 17, 2024
5	5	"Mystery Meeting"	Sebastian Cluer	Jermaine Richards & Trevaunn Richards	October 24, 2024
6	6	"The Offer"	Sebastian Cluer	Jermaine Richards & Trevaunn Richards	October 24, 2024

=== Season 2 (2025) ===
No. overall	No. in season	Title	Directed by	Written by	Original release date
7	1	"Mans Are Movin' Different"	Sebastian Cluer	Jermaine Richards & Trevaunn Richards	November 7, 2025
8	2	"Pure Bass"	Sebastian Cluer	Jermaine Richards, Trevaunn Richards & Lief Ramsaran	November 7, 2025
9	3	"Immigration Situation"	Sebastian Cluer	Jermaine Richards, Trevaunn Richards & Clara Altimas	November 7, 2025
10	4	"The Guyzer"	Sebastian Cluer	Jermaine Richards & Trevaunn Richards	November 7, 2025
Shazam Office Moving arrives an hour late to clear a school ahead of its demolition, forcing Cynthia, the project manager and Everett's mother, to bring in rival Lennox and his company, Omerta Logistics. While Everett talks about "guys" with Lennox on-site, Hassan and Eric are sent to buy steel-toed boots, where Zenithon Logistics CEO Zlad Johnson attempts to poach them. Doug is injured during the job, and Eric ultimately resigns to join Zenithon.
11	5	"Down Bad on Ramadan"	Sebastian Cluer	Jermaine Richards, Trevaunn Richards & Clara Altimas	November 7, 2025
12	6	"There's Guys and Lows in Life, Brother"	Sebastian Cluer	Jermaine Richards & Trevaunn Richards	November 7, 2025

=== Specials (2025-2026) ===
No. overall	Title	Directed by	Written by	Original release date
13	"The Office Movers Special: Projected to Have a Blessed Christmas"	Clara Altimas	Jermaine Richards, Trevaunn Richards & Clara Altimas	December 19, 2025
14	"The Office Movers Judge Tyco Special: Touched by a Prince"	Clara Altimas	Jermaine Richards & Trevaunn Richards	February 20, 2026

=== Season 3 (TBA) ===
No. overall	No. in season	Title	Directed by	Written by	Original release date
15	1	TBA	TBA	TBA	TBA
16	2	TBA	TBA	TBA	TBA
17	3	TBA	TBA	TBA	TBA
18	4	TBA	TBA	TBA	TBA
19	5	TBA	TBA	TBA	TBA
20	6	TBA	TBA	TBA	TBA
21	7	TBA	TBA	TBA	TBA
22	8	TBA	TBA	TBA	TBA
23	9	TBA	TBA	TBA	TBA
24	10	TBA	TBA	TBA	TBA
25	11	TBA	TBA	TBA	TBA
26	12	TBA	TBA	TBA	TBA

=== Specials (TBA) ===
No. overall	Title	Directed by	Written by	Original release date
27	TBA	TBA	TBA	TBA
28	TBA	TBA	TBA	TBA

== Awards and nominations ==
Awards and nominations received by The Office Movers
Award	Year (Note: The listed year refers to the date of the ceremony, not necessarily the year in which the corresponding season or episode aired.)	Category	Nominee(s)	Result	Ref.
Canadian Screen Awards	2025	Best Comedy Series	The Office Movers (Note: More specifically: Dan Bennett, Shane Corkery, Anton Leo, Jermaine Richards, Trevaunn Richards, Clara Altimas, Robbie David.)	Nominated	
Canadian Screen Awards	2025	Cogeco Fund Audience Choice	The Office Movers	Nominated	—N/a
Canadian Screen Awards	2026	Lead performance, comedy	Jermaine Richards	Nominated	
Canadian Screen Awards	2026	Supporting performance, comedy	Lucas Lopez	Nominated	
Canadian Screen Awards	2026	Ensemble performance in a comedy series	The Office Movers (Note: More specifically: Jermaine Richards, Trevaunn Richards, Heather Gallant, Lucas Lopez, Hassan Phills, Michael Charles, Solomon Kehinde, Danny Martinello, Zachariah Hamed.)	Nominated	
Canadian Screen Awards	2026	Photography in a comedy series	Elad Winkler (for "Mans Are Movin' Different")	Nominated	
Canadian Screen Awards	2026	Editing in a comedy program or series	Branden Bratuhin (for "Mans Are Movin' Different")	Nominated	
Canadian Screen Awards	2026	Cogeco Fund Audience Choice	The Office Movers	Nominated	—N/a
