= Jack Innanen =

Canadian comedian and actor (born 1999)

- Born: Jack Henry Thomas Innanen; April 7, 1999 (age 27); Toronto, Ontario, Canada
- Education: University of Toronto
- Occupations: Comedian; actor
- Years active: 2022–present
- Known for: Paul Baker in Adults

Jack Henry Thomas Innanen (born April 7, 1999) is a Canadian comedian and actor. He is best known for playing Paul Baker on the FX comedy series Adults (2025–present).

== Early life ==
Innanen was born in Toronto on April 7, 1999, and raised in Cambridge, Ontario, where he attended Galt Collegiate Institute. As a teenager, he was a Minecraft YouTuber who also made song lyric videos.

While studying astrophysics at the University of Toronto, Innanen started posting one-man comedy sketches on TikTok.

== Career ==
=== Acting career ===
Innanen first came to prominence for creating TikTok videos, which earned him more than three million followers on the platform and became a full-time job in 2022. He later moved to New York City to pursue an acting career.

Innanen's first television appearance was on Canadian sketch comedy series The Dessert (2023). He was also in Crave comedy series The Office Movers (2024).

He portrays Paul Baker in FX comedy series Adults, created by The Tonight Show writers Ben Kronengold and Rebecca Shaw and executive produced by Nick Kroll, about five housemates in Queens, New York. His character was initially conceived as from Colorado but was re-written as Canadian. Adults was the second show he auditioned for after moving to the United States.

In August 2025, Innanen joined the cast of Netflix comedy series Big Mistakes, which premiered on April 9, 2026. In February 2026, he joined the cast of Purgatory, Lindsay Lanzillotta's coming-of-age dramedy and feature directorial debut which premiered in September 2026. In November 2026, it was announced that Innanen would star in the Netflix comedy film Non-Refundable, directed by Paul Briganti and co-starring Millie Bobby Brown.

In 2026, Innanen was nominated for that year's Forbes 30 Under 30 list in the Hollywood & Entertainment category.

=== Other ventures ===
In 2024, photographer William Ferchichi collaborated with Innanen for an editorial spread in Numéro. Innanen modelled for Ralph Lauren Purple Label's 2026 spring collection and Louis Vuitton's 2025 men's collection. He has also collaborated with Thom Browne, Acne Studios, Burberry, Coach New York, and Coors Light.

== Personal life ==
As of June 2025, Innanen is in a relationship with fellow TikTok comedian Lauren Cantrell.

== Filmography ==
Year	Title	Role	Notes
2023	The Dessert		
2024	The Office Movers	Mike the Bike	3 episodes
2025–present	Adults	Paul Baker	Main role
2026–present	Big Mistakes	Max	Main role
2026	Purgatory	VP Thompson	
2027	Non-Refundable	Nate	Main role
