= After the Wedding (2019 film) =

2019 American drama film by Baurt Freundlich

- Theatrical release poster
- Directed by: Bart Freundlich
- Screenplay by: Bart Freundlich
- Based on: Efter brylluppet by: Susanne Bier; Anders Thomas Jensen
- Produced by: Joel B. Michaels; Julianne Moore; Bart Freundlich; Harry Finkel; Silvio Muraglia
- Starring: Julianne Moore; Michelle Williams; Billy Crudup; Abby Quinn
- Cinematography: Julio Macat
- Edited by: Joseph Krings
- Music by: Mychael Danna
- Production companies: Ingenious Media; Cornerstone Films; Joel B. Michaels Productions; Rock Island Films
- Distributed by: Sony Pictures Classics
- Release dates: January 24, 2019 (Sundance); August 9, 2019 (United States)
- Running time: 110 minutes
- Country: United States
- Language: English
- Box office: $2.9 million

After the Wedding is a 2019 American drama film written and directed by Bart Freundlich. It is a remake of the Danish-Swedish 2006 film of the same name by Susanne Bier. It stars Julianne Moore, Michelle Williams, Billy Crudup, and Abby Quinn.

The film had its world premiere at the 2019 Sundance Film Festival, and was released in the United States on August 9, 2019, by Sony Pictures Classics.

== Plot ==
Isabel Andersen, co-founder of an orphanage in India, must travel to New York to meet a potential benefactor, millionaire CEO Theresa Young. She is resistant to the trip due to her responsibilities at the orphanage and because she does not want to leave Jai, a boy whom she found on the street when he was a year old. He is the closest child in the orphanage to Isabel, and does not want Isabel to leave.

However, Theresa insists on an in-person meeting. Reluctantly, Isabel agrees and goes to it, which takes place the day before the wedding of Theresa's daughter Grace. Theresa invites Isabel to the wedding as a courtesy, so she feels obliged to attend.

At the wedding, Isabel is surprised to see Theresa's husband is her teenage sweetheart Oscar Carlson, now a renowned visual artist. During Grace's wedding toast, she discovers that Grace is not Theresa's biological daughter, but Oscar's. Isabel soon realizes that she is in fact her birth daughter by Oscar, whom they had placed for adoption as teenagers.

Isabel returns to the house the day after the wedding to confront Oscar. She learns that after placing the baby for adoption, he changed his mind within the 30-day grace period, so reclaimed the infant Grace without informing her. Isabel then forces Oscar and Theresa to also inform Grace, who had always been told her biological mother had died.

Theresa encourages Isabel to get to know Grace and reconnect with Oscar, and eventually decides to dramatically increase her donation to the orphanage, thereby forcing Isabel to extend her stay in New York. Eventually, Theresa makes her donation, as well as a newly established fund in Isabel and Grace's name. These are both contingent on Isabel moving to New York permanently.

Mistrustful of Theresa's real motives, Isabel angrily confronts her and learns that Theresa is dying. She then admits she has known about Isabel's link to Oscar and Grace all along and arranged the whole charade to install Isabel as a new mother figure to both Grace and Theresa's own eight-year-old twin boys Theo & Otto. Oscar discovers his wife's illness around the same time and eventually tells Grace, who is already struggling with doubts about her recent marriage and the news that Isabel is her biological mother.

Theresa dies soon after and the family scatter her ashes. Isabel then returns to India for a visit to the orphanage and Jai. The film ends with Jai and his friends playing football in the orphanage.

== Cast ==
- Julianne Moore as Theresa Young, a millionaire CEO and philanthropist. Married to Oscar and mother to Grace, Otto and Theo. She is a benefactor who knows about Isabel and is dying and wants to donate money to the orphanage.
- Michelle Williams as Isabel Andersen, founder of a charitable organization that runs an orphanage in Tamil Nadu. She is the biological mother of Grace.
- Billy Crudup as Oscar Carlson, a successful visual artist who is married to Theresa. Father to Grace, Otto and Theo.
- Abby Quinn as Grace Carlson, Theresa and Oscar's daughter who is about to get married.
- Alex Esola as Jonathan, Grace's fiancé who works for Theresa's company.
- Susan Blackwell as Gwen
- Will Chase as Frank, wedding guest who hits on Isabel, prompting her anger.
- Eisa Davis as Tanya
- Azhy Robertson as Otto Carlson, Theresa and Oscar's son and Theo's fraternal twin brother.
- Tre Ryder as Theo Carlson, Theresa and Oscar's son and Otto's fraternal twin brother.
- Anjula Bedi as Preena, who helps Isabel run the orphanage.
- Vir Pachisia as Jai, a young boy at the orphanage in India. He is very close to Isabel.

== Production ==
In February 2018, Julianne Moore was set to star in an American remake of the Danish film by Susanne Bier, and will see the leading roles changed from male to female. Diane Kruger was also cast. However, in April 2018, Michelle Williams replaced Kruger. In May 2018, Billy Crudup and Abby Quinn joined the cast.

Principal production began in May 2018.

== Release ==
The film had its world premiere at the Sundance Film Festival on January 24, 2019. In May 2019, Sony Pictures Classics acquired distribution rights to the film in North America, France and select Asian countries including India, setting it for an August 9, 2019 theatrical release in the United States.

== Reception ==
On Rotten Tomatoes, the film has an approval rating of 45% based on 156 reviews, and an average rating of 5.8/10. The site's critical consensus reads: "After the Wedding benefits from solid casting and strong source material, yet proves stubbornly resistant to spark to emotional life." On Metacritic the film has a weighted average score of 52 out of 100, based on reviews from 30 critics, indicating "mixed or average" reviews.

Variety's Peter Debruge wrote: "This sensitive remake of Susanne Bier's overcooked Danish Oscar nominee has shrewdly been flipped from a male-driven meller to an emotional showcase for Michelle Williams and Julianne Moore." Debruge praises the film for its subtlety, as it "strips away anything excessive, allowing subtext to surface in the quiet spaces between dialogue." David Rooney of The Hollywood Reporter wrote: "Bart Freundlich's American remake of the Bier film flips the gender of the main characters, yielding predictably strong performances from Julianne Moore and Michelle Williams but otherwise removing the teeth from a melodrama that grows increasingly preposterous as it crawls toward its weepy conclusion." Richard Roeper of the Chicago Sun-Times gave the film 2 out of 4, and wrote: "It's a morose and slow-paced and off-putting drama, in which even the joyous moments seem brittle and draped in melancholy." David Fear of Rolling Stone gave the film a mixed review but praised Williams: "This is Williams' spotlight, and it's worth slogging through some of the soapier-to-sludgier aspects to watch her ply her craft."
