= Danny Martinello =

Canadian actor and stand-up comedian

Danny Martinello is a Canadian actor and stand-up comedian from Edmonton, Alberta. He is most noted for his recurring supporting role as Doug in the television series The Office Movers, for which he and the other cast members received a Canadian Screen Award nomination for Best Ensemble Performance in a Comedy Series at the 14th Canadian Screen Awards in 2026.

He was the winner of the Seattle International Comedy Competition in 2021.

He has released two comedy albums, Covid Operations in 2021 and Starting Sober in 2023.

== Awards and nominations ==
| Year | Award | Category | Work | Result |
|---|---|---|---|---|
| 2026 | Canadian Screen Awards | Ensemble performance in a comedy series | The Office Movers (Note: Martinello was nominated alongside other cast members.) | Nominated |
