= Boran Kuzum =

Turkish actor (born 1992)

- Born: 1 October 1992 (age 33); Ankara, Turkey
- Occupation: Actor
- Years active: 2011–present
- Notable work: Vatanım Sensin; The Protector

Boran Kuzum (born 1 October 1992) is a Turkish actor. He graduated from the Theater Department of Istanbul University State Conservatory in 2015. Kuzum had studied economy at Ankara Gazi University for a year, but dropped out to focus on acting.

== Biography ==
Kuzum was born on 1 October 1992, in the city of Ankara, Turkey. His father, Bora Kuzum was the deputy manager of Ankara State Theatre. His mother, Fatma Zehra, is a graduate of Fine Arts.

== Career ==
Kuzum played a protester named Suat in 9 episodes of the period drama Analar ve Anneler alongside Okan Yalabık and played the mad sultan Mustafa I, in 12 episodes of the period drama Muhteşem Yüzyıl: Kösem. Opposite Miray Daner, he played a Greek lieutenant named Leon in the period drama Vatanım Sensin, which won a Golden Butterfly Award for Best Series. His other roles were in the spin off crime series Saygı and the fantasy series Hakan: Muhafız. He acted alongside Pınar Deniz, in the film Aşkın Kıyameti.

He played "Konstantin Gavrilovich Treplev" in the play The Seagull by Anton Chekhov at the Istanbul Theater Festival's opening. The play won the Üstün Akmen Theatre Award for Best Play and was nominated for the Afife Jale Award.

In 2026, Kuzum had his international series debut, playing Yusuf in American crime comedy series Big Mistakes.

== Filmography ==
=== Film ===
Year	Movie	Role	Notes	Ref.
2012	Aşka Dokunmak	Hakan	Short film	
2014	Bir Adam Yaratmak	Journalist	Short film	
2017	Cingöz Recai: Bir Efsanenin Dönüşü	Cüneyt		
2020	Biz Böyleyiz	Emrah	Lead role	
2022	Aşkın Kıyameti	Fırat	Lead role	
2022	Hazine	Musa	Lead role	
2022	Yılbaşı Gecesi	Togay	Lead role	
2023	Bihter	Behlül	Lead role	
2024	Intoxicated by Love	Ala ad-Din Muhammad II		
2024	Mucize Aynalar	Kerim Ongun	Lead role	
2024	Adresi Olmayan Ev	Alper	Lead role	

=== Television series ===
Year	Movie	Role	Notes	Ref.
2015	Analar ve Anneler	Suat		
2016	Muhteşem Yüzyıl: Kösem	Mustafa I		
2016–2018	Vatanım Sensin	Leonidas Papadopoulos	Lead role	
2018	Şahin Tepesi	Efe Akdora	Lead role	
2020	Menajerimi Ara	Himself	Guest role	
2026	Big Mistakes	Yusuf	Guest role	

=== Web series ===
Year	Movie	Role	Notes	Ref.
2019–2020	The Protector	Okhan / Hekim		
2020–2021	Saygı	Savaş Kaya	Lead role	
2024	Kimler Geldi, Kimler Geçti	Şeyyaz	Lead role	
2026–present	Big Mistakes	Yusuf	Lead role	

=== Music video appearances ===
- Bergüzar Korel - "Son Mektup"

== Theatre ==
Year	Movie	Role	Theater	Ref.
2015	Oyunun Oyunu (Noises Off)	Frederick / Philip Brent	Istanbul University State Conservatory	
2017–2018	Martı (The Seagull)	Konstantin Gavrilovich Treplev	Pürtelaş Theatre, Istanbul, Turkey	

== Awards and nominations ==
Year presented, name of the award ceremony, category, nominee(s) of the award, and the result of the nomination
Year	Award ceremony	Category	Nominated work(s)	Result	Ref.
2017	44th Golden Butterfly Awards	Best Couple	Vatanım Sensin	Nominated	
2017	Bilkent TV	Awards Best Breakthrough Actor	Vatanım Sensin	Won	
2017	Bilkent TV Awards	Best Couple	Vatanım Sensin	Won	
2017	GSU En Awards	Best Theater Actor	The Seagull	Nominated	
2017	Crystal Screen Awards	Best Supporting Actors	Vatanım Sensin Boran Kuzum and Miray Daner	Won	
2018	KTÜ Media Awards	Best Breakthrough Actor	Vatanım Sensin Boran Kuzum and Miray Daner	Nominated	
2018	KTÜ Media Awards	Best Couple	Vatanım Sensin Boran Kuzum and Miray Daner	Nominated	
2018	Çorbada Tuzun Olsun Award	Best Breakthrough Actor	Vatanım Sensin Boran Kuzum and Miray Daner	Won	
2018	Çorbada Tuzun Olsun Award	Best Couple	Vatanım Sensin Boran Kuzum and Miray Daner	Won	
2025	26th Sadri Alışık Theatre and Film Actor Awards	Best Supporting Actor of the Year in Dark Comedy	Miracle Mirrors	Nominated	
