= Wyatt Cenac's Problem Areas =

American documentary television series (2018–2019)

- Genre: Documentary
- Presented by: Wyatt Cenac
- Theme music composer: James Poyser
- Country of origin: United States
- Original language: English
- No. of seasons: 2
- No. of episodes: 20

Production
- Executive producers: Wyatt Cenac; Hallie Haglund; John Oliver; Ezra Edelman; Tim Greenberg; David Martin; James Taylor; Jon Thoday
- Cinematography: Graham Willoughby
- Running time: 26–33 minutes
- Production companies: Amalgamated Bear; Sixteen String Jack Productions; Avalon Television

Original release
- Network: HBO
- Release: April 13, 2018 – June 7, 2019

Wyatt Cenac's Problem Areas is an American documentary television series hosted by Wyatt Cenac. It premiered on April 13, 2018, on HBO. The series is executive produced by Cenac, Ezra Edelman, John Oliver, Tim Greenberg, David Martin, James Taylor, Jon Thoday and head writer Hallie Haglund. A second season began broadcasting on April 5, 2019. On June 7 of that year, the series was cancelled.

The show takes "a satirical look at social and cultural issues from Cenac's unique perspective. Rather than sit behind a desk, he will undertake a journey to understand some of the big issues of the moment and investigate real-world solutions".

== Production ==
On October 16, 2017, it was announced that HBO had given a series order to a new documentary television series presented by Wyatt Cenac. The series order was for a first season consisting of ten episodes in which Cenac would executive produce alongside Ezra Edelman, John Oliver, Tim Greenberg, David Martin, James Taylor, Jon Thoday, and head writer Hallie Haglund. Production companies involved in the series were slated to consist of Avalon Television.

On March 8, 2018, it was announced that the series had been titled Wyatt Cenac's Problem Areas and that it would premiere on April 13, 2018. On May 22, 2018, it was announced that HBO had renewed the series for a second season.

== Episodes ==
Season	Episodes	Originally released	
Season	Episodes	First released	Last released
1	10	April 13, 2018	June 15, 2018
2	10	April 5, 2019	June 7, 2019

=== Season 1 (2018) ===
No.	Title	Original release date	U.S. viewers (millions)
1	"Space Problems, Shit Problems, Minnesota Problems"	April 13, 2018	0.307
Wyatt explores the current state of space travel, looks at alternative sources of fuel, and travels to Minnesota to learn about what's wrong with policing in the United States.
2	"NRA Problems, Chicken Bone Problems, Birmingham Problems"	April 20, 2018	0.330
Wyatt explores the relationship between the NRA and the movies, dogs eating chicken bones, and travels to Birmingham, Alabama to learn about police apologies.
3	"Energy Problems, Millennial Problems, Community Policing Problems"	April 27, 2018	0.207
Wyatt travels to Illinois to learn about the Elgin community’s resident officer program and discusses a police shooting that occurred soon after he’d left.
4	"Food Problems, Rain Problems, Skid Row Problems"	May 4, 2018	0.211
Wyatt discusses sanctuary for undocumented workers in the food and agriculture industries and the problems they face, rain, and efforts to reduce police presence in Skid Row, Los Angeles.
5	"Bank Problems, Mosquito Problems, Mental Health Problems"	May 11, 2018	0.269
Wyatt talks about banking deserts, a proposed bill to allow post offices to provide some banking services, combatting mosquitoes, and the relationship of people with mental health problems and the police.
6	"Automation Problems, Beauty Problems, Gun Problems"	May 18, 2018	0.291
Wyatt discusses the issues of robots taking more and more entry-level jobs, universal basic income, nonlethal alternatives to firearms for police officers, and a way to make beauty products environmentally friendly.
7	"Student Problems, Sidewalk Problems, Misconduct Problems"	May 25, 2018	0.180
Wyatt examines America's student loan crisis, attempts to improve sidewalk traffic in the busy urban populace, and explores the issue of police sexual misconduct.
8	"Tech Waste Problems, Adhesive Problems, Drug Problems"	June 1, 2018	0.302
Wyatt explores why cell phones break down, the background of adhesive on stationery, and how some city police departments are moving past the war on drugs.
9	"Research Problems, Reef Problems, Punitive Problems"	June 8, 2018	0.186
Wyatt notes the historical exclusion of women in medical research, explores man-made reefs, and examines the process of restorative justice.
10	"Teacher Problems, Burial Problems, Collaborative Problems"	June 15, 2018	0.258
In the season one finale, Wyatt considers the lack of funding for America's teachers, finds a new angle on the circle of life and concludes his season-long examination of policing with one community's unique approach.

=== Season 2 ===
No.	Title	Original release date	U.S. viewers (millions)
1	"Labor Problems"	April 5, 2019	N/A
Wyatt examines why workers at major fast-food chains aren't unionized, contemplates the perfect pair of shoes to wear to a protest, and travels to West Virginia to learn about teachers' strikes.
2	"Safety Problems"	April 12, 2019	N/A
Wyatt explores the role of facial-recognition software in surveillance, tries to curb car-on-bike crime, and travels to New York to question the idea of school safety.
3	"Mental Health Problems"	April 19, 2019	N/A
Wyatt considers what living in a city does to your brain, finds a new alternative to sitting at a desk all day, and travels to Salem, Oregon, to see how the city is addressing the mental-health concerns of students.
4	"Sex Problems"	April 26, 2019	N/A
Wyatt explores the consequences of gendered toys, protecting women from their greatest threat, and San Francisco's progressive sex education program.
5	"Inequality Problems"	May 3, 2019	N/A
Wyatt looks at who gets access to good dental care, delivers a pitch investors simply can't turn down, and travels to Seattle to see how a group of parents fought to keep their school from being shut down.
6	"Private Sector Problems"	May 10, 2019	N/A
Wyatt considers whether we can justify the environmental cost of air travel, looks at a place where bookstores may be able to thrive, and travels to Minneapolis to learn how the city became a leader in healthy school lunches.
7	"Automation Problems"	May 17, 2019	N/A
Wyatt looks at the unintended consequences of standardized testing, considers a high-tech way to streamline fender benders, and travels to Des Moines to see how Iowans are dealing with automation.
8	"Higher Education Problems"	May 24, 2019	N/A
Wyatt looks at the complicated relationship between banks and universities, proposes a way to "gamify" real world skills, and investigates why some for-profit colleges target veterans.
9	"Immigration Problems"	May 31, 2019	N/A
10	"Segregation Problems"	June 7, 2019	N/A

== Release ==
Promotional poster.

On March 8, 2018, HBO released a promotional poster. A day later, the first trailer for the series was released.

== Reception ==
=== Critical response ===
In a positive review, The A.V. Club's Danette Chavez called the show, "pointedly funny, and a necessary addition to late-night." She went on to offer the show praise and described its outlook saying, "Cenac's not interested in preaching to the choir or rehashing liberal talking points. The loose structure of the show—there's no real monologue, but there are segments and cheeky, animated asides—mirrors Cenac's desire to map out a blueprint for change. He knows this means there will be a few, if not many, wrong turns and dead ends, but he's not afraid to admit he doesn't have all the answers." In a more mixed review, Matt Zoller Seitz of Vulture called the show a "mixed bag" and said that Cenac comes across like "a man ranting alone in a basement rec room."

=== Awards and nominations ===
Year	Award	Category	Nominee(s)	Result	Ref.
2019	GLAAD Media Award	GLAAD Media Award for Outstanding Variety or Talk Show Episode	"NRA Problems, Chicken Bone Problems, Birmingham Problems"	Nominated	
