= The Stand-In (1999 film) =

- Directed by: Roberto Monticello
- Written by: Robbie Bryan
- Starring: Robbie Bryan; Daniel Margotta; David Ogden Stiers; Joseph Barbara; Judith Ivey
- Release date: 1999
- Running time: 100 minutes
- Country: United States
- Language: English

The Stand-in is a 1999 American drama film produced by "Good To Be Seen Films" and directed by Roberto Monticello. The cast features Robbie Bryan, Joseph Barbara, Judith Ivey, and David Ogden Stiers.

== Plot ==
A struggling actor takes inspiration from his day-job, caring for an injured black athlete.
