= Joseph Barbara (actor) =

American television and soap opera actor

- Born: Joseph Edward Barbara; New Smyrna Beach, Florida, U.S.
- Occupation: Actor
- Years active: 1981–present
- Spouse: Nicole Perry (m. 2000)
- Children: 3

Joseph Edward Barbara is an American television and soap opera actor.

== Early life ==
Barbara has a B.S. in television and film production from Syracuse University. After leaving college, he worked briefly as a production assistant at Entertainment Tonight.

== Career ==
He is best known for his role on Another World as Joseph Carlino (from 1995 to 1999). He then appeared on All My Children in 2000 as Paolo Caselli. He also appeared on Broadway in the revival of the musical Grease (as Danny Zuko) and off-Broadway in Tony and Tina's Wedding (as 'Dominick Fabrizi'). He is currently performing the role of Charlie Maffia and others in the musical Just In Time on Broadway. He was also the voice of Ray Boccino in Grand Theft Auto IV.

== Filmography ==
=== Film ===
Year	Title	Role	Notes
1999	The Stand-In	Bartender	
2002	Pride & Loyalty	Anthony Palermo	
2005	Hate	E.S.U. Sgt. Delgado	TV movie
2019	Hooked	Detective Frank Scagnetti	Short
2022	Jersey Boys Live!	Gyp DeCarlo	

=== Television ===
Year	Title	Role	Notes
1994	The Cosby Mysteries	Jackhammer	Episode: "Our Lady of Cement"
1995–1999	Another World	Joseph Carlino	Contact role
1997	Oddville MTV	Himself	1 episode
2000	All My Children	Paolo Casselli	3 episodes
2007–2008	Law & Order	Sgt. Sloan / E.S.U. Sgt. Delgado	2 episodes
2022	Blue Bloods	Chris Kelly	Episode: "Cold Comfort"
2025	FBI	McInnis	Episode: "Descent"
2026	Big Mistakes	Mike	3 episodes

=== Video games ===
Year	Title	Role	Notes
2008	Grand Theft Auto IV	Ray Boccino	Voice role
2009	Grand Theft Auto IV: The Lost and Damned	Ray Boccino	Voice role
