= Jae and Trey Richards =

Canadian comedy duo

- Jermaine "Jae" (left) and Trevaunn "Trey" Richards (right) in 2024
- Born: Jermaine Richards; Trevaunn Richards; Brampton, Ontario, Canada
- Citizenship: Canadian
- Notable work: The Office Movers

Comedy career
- Years active: 2011–present
- Medium: Television, YouTube, podcasting
- Genres: Sketch comedy; sitcom

Jermaine "Jae" Richards and Trevaunn "Trey" Richards are Canadian brothers from Brampton, Ontario, who work as comedians and producers. They started on YouTube and later co-created and starred in the Crave series The Office Movers (2024–present). Their production company is Random Order Studios.

== Early life and YouTube career ==
The brothers grew up in Brampton. Both worked part time for their father's commercial office-moving company. They have said that this job gave them the idea for The Office Movers.

They began making comedy videos in high school and started a YouTube channel called 4YallEntertainment, later shortened to 4YE. Trey has said the name came from a classmate's suggestion. The channel, also called Jae & Trey Vlogs, posted sketches, vlogs and recurring characters, including Tyco. According to Bell Media, their videos have received hundreds of millions of views.

In 2017, producer Boi-1da asked the brothers for permission to sample their sketch T-Dot Goon Scrap on Drake's song "Madiba Riddim", from the album More Life. The brothers then asked Drake to appear in a sequel sketch, and he came to Toronto to film it. Drake later appeared in a promotional sketch for his 2025 album with PartyNextDoor.

The brothers also started an apparel brand, 4YE.

== The Office Movers ==
=== Premise ===
The Office Movers is a half-hour comedy created by and starring Jae and Trey Richards. It is produced by Counterfeit Pictures for Crave. It follows brothers Everett Saunders (Jae) and Eric Saunders (Trey), who take over their father's office-moving company, Shazam Moving, in the Toronto area. Everett wants to grow the business and sell it to a larger competitor, Zenithon Logistics.

The show draws on the brothers' own work experience. Crave's promotional material gives examples such as Trey breaking a glass door on his first day and an argument with a pizza delivery driver over a "free if late" offer. Lucas Lopez plays Riccardo, the brothers' Cuban stepbrother, and other characters are based on crews the brothers worked with growing up. Episodes use on-screen subtitles for Toronto slang, a device the brothers also used in their YouTube sketches.

=== Season 1 ===
The series was announced in September 2024 and premiered on Crave on October 11, 2024, with new episodes each week. Season 1 had six episodes. Bell Media said it was one of Crave's 20 most-streamed titles during its release period. After the season ended, the brothers said they were unsure whether it would be renewed, given how often Canadian streaming series are cancelled. Crave ordered a second season in December 2024, with production starting in 2025.

=== Season 2 ===
Season 2 premiered on Crave on November 7, 2025. Shazam Moving competes with Zenithon Logistics. Eric is tempted to join the rival company, and Everett tries several schemes to keep the business going, including staged insurance claims. The brothers said the season gives more time to different pairings of cast members.

Drake appears in the season as a customer in a tense scene with Jae's character. The brothers said they kept the cameo secret for about a year. Crave renewed the series for a third season around the time of the Season 2 premiere.

== Random Order Studios ==
The brothers founded Random Order Studios with executive producer Julian Lloyd. The company produces the Crave series Judge Tyco, a courtroom comedy built around their character Tyco, and the podcast Random Order, distributed by Headgum, in which the brothers discuss pop culture.

On April 30, 2026, Bell Media announced a co-development and first-look deal with the studio. Under it, Bell's distribution arm, Sphere Abacus, has first-look international rights to the studio's projects. Sphere Abacus also announced that it had sold seasons 1 to 3 of The Office Movers to the British broadcaster Sky.

== Reception ==
Now Toronto described The Office Movers as centred on Toronto's multicultural communities and shot at locations across the Greater Toronto Area. The brothers, whose family is Jamaican and Colombian, have said the show depicts a side of the city's working-class and immigrant communities that Canadian television rarely shows. They have also said that viewers of the show have hired their father's moving company.

== Filmography ==
Year	Title	Role	Notes
2024–present	The Office Movers	Everett Saunders (Jae); Eric Saunders (Trey)	Co-creators, writers and executive producers

== Awards and nominations ==
=== Jae and Trey Richards ===
Year	Award	Category	Work	Result	Ref.
2025	Canadian Screen Awards	Best Comedy Series	The Office Movers (Note: Jae and Trey were nominated alongside other cast members.)	Nominated	
2026	Canadian Screen Awards	Ensemble performance in a comedy series	The Office Movers	Nominated	

=== Jermaine Richards ===
Year	Award	Category	Work	Result	Ref.
2026	Canadian Screen Awards	Lead performance, comedy	The Office Movers	Nominated	
