= I Love LA (TV series) =

American comedy television series

- Genre: Comedy
- Created by: Rachel Sennott
- Starring: Rachel Sennott; Odessa A'zion; True Whitaker; Jordan Firstman; Josh Hutcherson
- Music by: Kenneth Blume
- Country of origin: United States
- Original language: English
- No. of seasons: 1
- No. of episodes: 8

Production
- Executive producers: Rachel Sennott; Emma Barrie; Aida Rodgers; Max Silvestri; Lorene Scafaria
- Producer: Carr Rundle
- Production locations: Los Angeles, California
- Production companies: Bizarro Brothers; Treacly Productions; HBO Entertainment

Original release
- Network: HBO
- Release: November 2, 2025 – present

I Love LA is an American comedy television series created, written by, and starring Rachel Sennott for HBO. The series follows Maia (Rachel Sennott), a clientless talent agent until she reconnects with her ex-best friend and influencer Tallulah (Odessa A'zion). Its supporting cast includes True Whitaker, Jordan Firstman, and Josh Hutcherson. It premiered on November 2, 2025, and was renewed for a second season later that month.

== Premise ==
This series follows Maia Simsbury, a talent agent two years into a failing career at talent agency Alyssa180. Maia struggles to be seen as worthy for a promotion, until her ex-best friend and New York influencer Tallulah Stiel visits. With her dream job now clouding her brain, she and her codependent friend group navigate their time, their ambitions, and how their new relationships have changed them.

== Cast and characters ==
=== Main ===
- Rachel Sennott as Maia Simsbury, an ambitious young woman who aspires to be a talent manager
- Odessa A'zion as Tallulah Stiel, a successful influencer and Maia's college friend
- True Whitaker as Alani Marcus, Maia's friend and the daughter of a famous director
- Jordan Firstman as Charlie Cohen, a celebrity stylist in West Hollywood and Maia's friend
- Josh Hutcherson as Dylan, a schoolteacher and Maia's boyfriend

=== Recurring ===
- Leighton Meester as Alyssa, a talent manager and Maia's boss
- Lauren Holt as Courtney, Maia's co-worker
- Moses Ingram as Tessa, a chef and love interest of Tallulah

=== Guest ===
- Annalisa Cochrane as Paulena, an influencer from New York City and Tallulah's frenemy
- Ayo Edebiri as Mimi Rush, one of Charlie's clients
- Augusto Aguilera as Andrew, Charlie's ex-boyfriend
- Josh Brener as Victor, a crisis PR manager
- Quenlin Blackwell as herself
- Caitlin Reilly as Naomi, a friend of Quenlin
- Froy Gutierrez as Lukas Landry, a Christian singer famous on TikTok
- Elijah Wood as himself
- Ben Feldman as Jeremy, Alyssa's partner
- Colin Woodell as Ben, Maia's former boss in New York City
- Callie Hernandez as Clare, a teacher at Dylan's school
- Lily Sullivan as Megan, a Ritz Crackers executive
- Tim Baltz as Antoine, the organizer of a noted fashion industry dinner
- Keith David as Leon, Alani's father

== Episodes ==
No.	Title	Directed by	Written by	Original release date
1	"Block Her"	Lorene Scafaria	Rachel Sennott	November 2, 2025
On her 27th birthday, Maia approaches her boss, Alyssa, for a promotion. Alyssa is hesitant, citing Maia's lack of experience in a managerial role. Before their conversation is interrupted by a phone call, Maia describes her relationship with Tallulah, now an estranged friend living in New York City, as a time when she had a talent manager role. Later, Maia arrives home to find that Tallulah has come to Los Angeles, as arranged by their friend Alani. Their reunion is awkward, and Maia says her request for promotion was successful. At Maia's birthday party, the pair reveal they have both been lying about their successes, and decide that Tallulah will move to Los Angeles and live with Maia as a client.
2	"Roger & Munchy"	Bill Benz	EJ Marcus	November 9, 2025
Maia is trying to organize a management plan for Tallulah over coffee when they are interrupted by Paulena, an acquaintance of Tallulah's from New York, who accuses her of stealing her Balenciaga bag. Maia becomes worried that Paulena will press charges in New York, potentially affecting Tallulah's career. Tallulah attempts to make amends, telling her she is six weeks sober and inviting her to dinner with Maia and her boyfriend Dylan. Paulena manipulates Maia and Dylan into doing cocaine with her, but Maia pretends to instigate a fight with Dylan to make Paulena uncomfortable and leave. After leaving, she overhears Maia and Tallulah laughing about the act, and decides to post a video to her followers disparaging Tallulah.
3	"Girl's Girl"	Bill Benz	Jean Kyoung Frazier	November 16, 2025
Paulena's video goes viral, putting Tallulah's career in jeopardy. Maia reassures Tallulah that she will handle the situation, seeking help from her firm, who provide her with a pre-written apology statement. Alani encourages Tallulah to go out and enjoy herself amidst the controversy, going to a restaurant. Maia, overhearing advice from a mother, is questioning her firm's approach, while Paulena continues to post videos. Maia and Tallulah learn information from Alani, including that Paulena's family previously owned Rikers Island and now manufactures chemical weapons. They use the information to prepare a response video, going against Alyssa's advice of apologizing. Consequently, Maia is informed that Tallulah has been dropped from a shampoo deal, but she receives a text from Balenciaga asking for her address.
4	"Upstairses"	Kevin Bray	Max Silvestri	November 23, 2025
Maia, Tallulah, Alani and Charlie go to a party at Elijah Wood's house, hosted by Quenlin, an influencer Tallulah has been talking to since her rebuttal video went live. At the party, Quenlin takes Tallulah away to talk about her career and they decide to record a video together for a recent TikTok trend, though Quenlin makes them do many takes, obsessing about every detail. Meanwhile, Maia and Alani go upstairs and find Elijah in his bedroom watching The Simpsons. The pair interpret him asking them to wear robes and join him on his bed as a proposition for a threesome, but realize they have misunderstood the degree of his germaphobia and leave the party alongside Tallulah and Charlie.
5	"They Can't All Be Jeremys"	Kevin Bray	Sidney Butler & Austin S. Harris	November 30, 2025
Maia and Dylan are invited to dinner hosted by Alyssa and her partner, Jeremy. Shortly after they arrive, Jeremy begins to experience symptons of a migraine, triggered by Maia's loud talking and strong perfume, and he excuses himself to have a nap. Dylan goes to the kitchen to start cooking while Alyssa explains that Jeremy had a skiing accident which spurred on his migraines. When Maia excuses herself to go to the bathroom, she sees Jeremy masturbating to pornography in another room. She tells Dylan about it, but they stay to finish dinner with Alyssa. Their efforts are deemed a success when Alyssa invites Maia to join her for her profile in Forbes. Meanwhile, Charlie spends time with his new client, Lukas, who surprises him by being non-judgemental, unlike his other friends in LA. While scrolling on TikTok, Maia learns that Lukas has been killed in an ATV accident.
6	"Game Night"	Lorene Scafaria	Emma Barrie & Max Silvestri	December 7, 2025
Maia accidentally outs Tallulah to a Ritz Crackers executive who places her as a queer spokesperson on a mural, much to Tallulah's embarrassment. Tessa comforts her with her own cringeworthy daytime television appearance, and they both vandalize Tallulah's mural. At Lukas' funeral, Charlie runs into an ex-boyfriend, Andrew, and learns he is moving to New York. Alani encourages Charlie to destroy his old sex tape with him and visit a vintage electronics store where he privately watches their tape. He cries after a text to Lukas no longer delivers. During the Forbes photoshoot, Maia receives an invitation from her old boss, Ben, and gets drunk over lunch with him. She returns home during Dylan's game night and embarrasses him in front of his co-workers with sexually charged behavior, jealously targeting his co-worker Clare. Maia and Dylan then have aggressive sex, as she fantasizes about Ben.
7	"Divas Down"	Lorene Scafaria	Emma Barrie	December 14, 2025
Maia and Alyssa await the arrival of Antoine, a French man in charge of an annual high-status dinner in New York. Alyssa is trying to get him interested in one of her clients, but he is more interested in Tallulah and arranges to meet with her and Maia. Tallulah is not interested, citing the failure of the previous deal with Ritz. Maia panics and accidentally drops a steak knife onto her foot, resulting in a trip to the emergency room. She eventually convinces Tallulah of the prestige of the dinner and apologizes for the Ritz deal. They arrive at the restaurant and find Antoine with Alyssa, who is trying to convince him to invite a different client instead. Maia interrupts and impresses Antoine, who officially invites Tallulah to the dinner. Angered, Alyssa asks Maia if she is willing to put the company above her own clients. Maia says she is not, and is fired. She arrives home to Dylan cleaning up after a dinner with his parents that she missed. They fight, with him being frustrated that she went to the emergency room without even calling him. He leaves, telling her that he needs a break from their relationship.
8	"I Love NY"	Rachel Sennott	Rachel Sennott	December 21, 2025
Maia, Tallulah and Alani travel to New York City for the Formé fashion dinner. Stressed about her career and taking a temporary break from Dylan, Maia meets with Ben, who offers her a lucrative job to represent Tallulah under his brand. However, when Ben forces Maia into a deeply uncomfortable, boundary-crossing power dynamic by making her masturbate in his hotel room, Maia rejects the position; unable to face disappointing Tallulah, she conceals the true reason for turning it down. Meanwhile, Tallulah finds herself in a wardrobe crisis trying to hide an unflattering matching tattoo that she and Maia got while drunk one night, prompting Maia to call Charlie in Los Angeles to coordinate emergency styling help. Back in LA, Charlie comes to terms with his feelings for his ex-boyfriend while checking in on a spiraling Dylan, who vents about his distance from Maia. In Manhattan, Alani confronts her father, Leon, after believing a woman who broke into his apartment is his mistress; the situation violently escalates when the woman stabs him, revealing to a shocked Alani that she was actually his long-time stalker. In LA, it is revealed that Dylan ultimately cheats on Maia with Clare. A traffic shutdown across Lower Manhattan force Maia and Tallulah to abandon their car and sprint through the subway system in full formalwear as they race against time to reach the event.

== Production ==
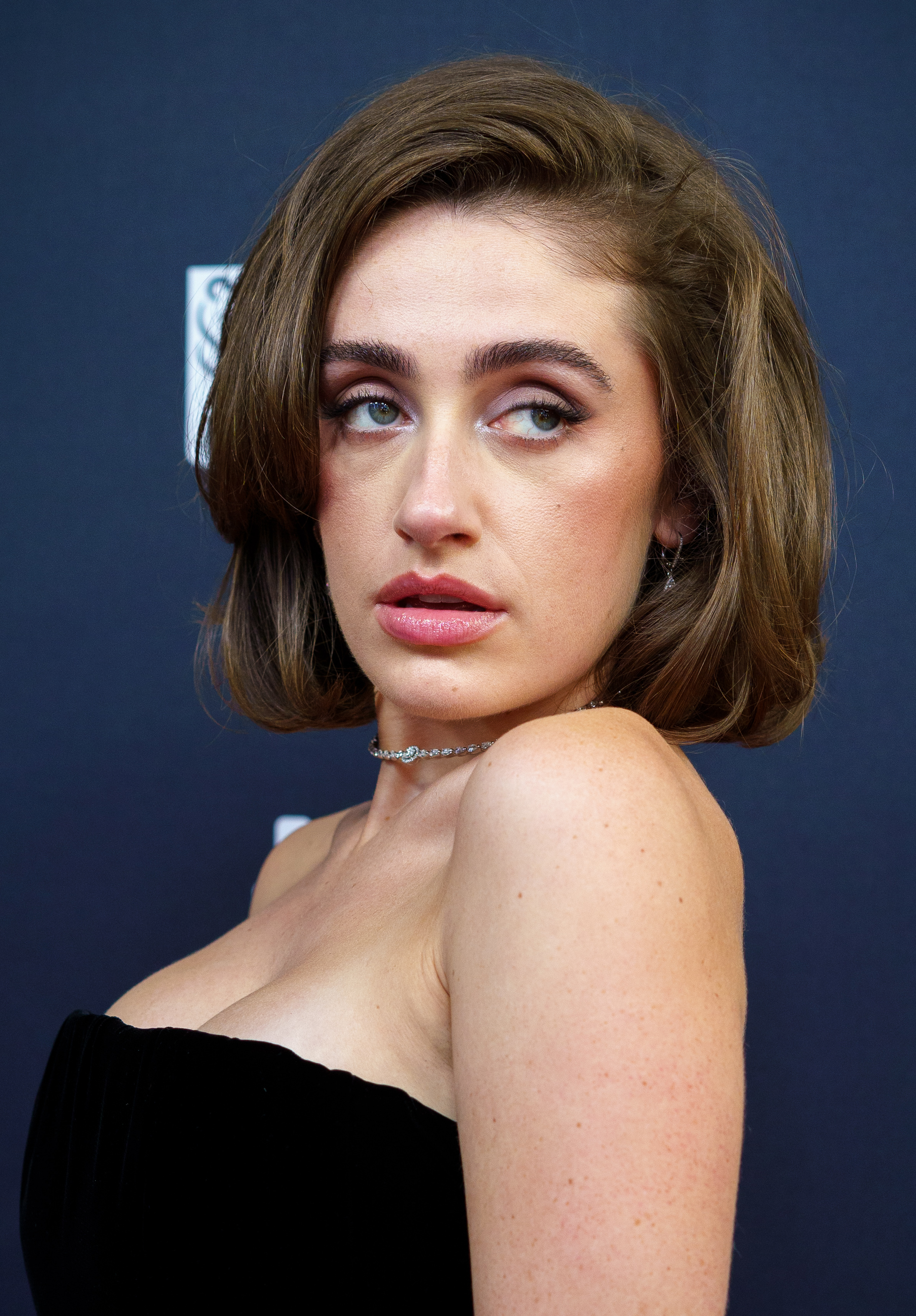
I Love LA creator Rachel Sennott is also its head writer and lead actor.

On March 18, 2024, Deadline Hollywood reported that HBO had ordered a television pilot from Rachel Sennott. Odessa A'zion, Jordan Firstman, True Whitaker and Miles Robbins were announced as main cast members in June. Leighton Meester and Quenlin Blackwell joined the cast in guest roles in July 2024. The show was greenlit in September 2024.

Josh Hutcherson replaced Robbins in May 2025 after character and plot changes. Sennott cast Hutcherson and reasoned: "I've been a fan of his since Bridge to Terabithia. I feel like when I met with him on Zoom, I was like, he's so disarming and charming, and he immediately feels at home. He is warm and makes you feel comfortable. I think he has amazing comedic instincts. He's really funny. I've seen him in dramatic stuff, but I was blown away by how funny he is." In June 2025, Moses Ingram, Lauren Holt, Elijah Wood, and Josh Brener joined the cast in recurring and guest capacities.

On August 26, various trade publications reported that the series was titled I Love LA and its premiere date was set for November.

On November 20, HBO renewed the series for a second season. Filming for the season began on July 28, 2026. In August 2026, Taron Egerton, Jamie Chung, Benjamin Norris, Dylan Arnold, Jessy Hodges, Milan Carter, Katy O'Brian, Lindsay Sloane, Michael Rispoli, Nelson Franklin, and Rajet Suresh joined the cast in recurring and guest capacities.

== Release ==
The pilot aired simultaneously on HBO and HBO Max on November 2, 2025. Subsequent episodes were released weekly in the Sunday 10:30 p.m. slot following The Chair Company and It: Welcome to Derry. The season finale aired on December 21, 2025.

== Reception ==
=== Critical response ===
On the review aggregator website Rotten Tomatoes, the series holds an approval rating of 86%, based on 44 critic reviews. The website's critics consensus reads: "An irreverent and self-referential comedy speaking to Gen Z existentialism, I Love LA is equal parts funny and cringe thanks to creator Rachel Sennott's absurdist sensibility." Metacritic gave the series a weighted average score of 64 out of 100, based on 22 critics, indicating "generally favorable" reviews.

=== Accolades ===
Award	Date of ceremony	Category	Nominee(s)	Result	Ref.
Astra TV Awards	August 15, 2026	Best Comedy Series	I Love LA	Nominated	
Astra TV Awards	August 15, 2026	Best Actress in a Comedy Series	Rachel Sennott	Nominated	
Astra TV Awards	August 15, 2026	Best Supporting Actor in a Comedy Series	Josh Hutcherson	Nominated	
Astra TV Awards	August 15, 2026	Best Supporting Actress in a Comedy Series	Odessa A'zion	Nominated	
Astra TV Awards	August 15, 2026	Best Guest Actor in a Comedy Series	Elijah Wood	Nominated	
Astra TV Awards	August 15, 2026	Best Cable Comedy Ensemble	I Love LA	Nominated	
GLAAD Media Awards	March 5, 2026	Outstanding New TV Series	I Love LA	Nominated	
Gotham TV Awards	June 1, 2026	Breakthrough Comedy Series	Rachel Sennott, Emma Barrie, Aida Rodgers, Lorene Scafaria, and Max Silvestri	Won	
Gotham TV Awards	June 1, 2026	Outstanding Lead Performance in a Comedy Series	Rachel Sennott	Nominated	
Gotham TV Awards	June 1, 2026	Outstanding Supporting Performance in a Comedy Series	Odessa A'zion	Nominated	
Make-Up Artists and Hair Stylists Guild Awards	February 14, 2026	Best Contemporary Make-Up in Television – Limited or Movie for Television	Michelle Chung, Erin Rosenmann, and Afton Storton	Nominated	
Queerties Awards	March 10, 2026	Best TV Comedy	I Love LA	Nominated	
