= Timothy Greenberg =

American writer, director and producer

Timothy Greenberg is an American writer, director and producer based in New York City. In 2019, Greenberg created the Netflix series Living with Yourself, for which he received a Writers Guild Award nomination. He also served as an executive producer of The Daily Show with Jon Stewart, where he won two Emmy Awards and a Peabody Award.

== Career ==
Greenberg began his career as a CGI artist-animator on Riven: the sequel to Myst, after winning an animation contest. He was later hired to write and direct the live-action elements for the game, which became one of the top-selling PC titles of all time. He subsequently co-founded a computer graphics software company based on technology developed for Riven.

Following a stint directing commercials, in 2006 he joined The Daily Show as a producer in the field department. While there he directed field segments, including a series filmed in Iran; the subsequent imprisonment of interviewee and journalist Maziar Bahari served as inspiration for Jon Stewart's 2014 film Rosewater. Greenberg was eventually promoted to executive producer of The Daily Show. During his time there he won two Primetime Emmy Awards and was nominated for two more.

He served as an executive producer on Comedy Central's DL Hughley: Endangered List, for which he received a Peabody Award. He later served as executive producer on HBO's Wyatt Cenac's Problem Areas, a docuseries focusing on policing in America.

In February 2017, IFC announced that it had greenlit his scripted dark comedy series Living with Yourself.

On August 10, 2018, it was announced that the project had moved to Netflix which had given the production a series order for a first season consisting of eight episodes. Alongside the announcement of the series move to Netflix, it was confirmed that Paul Rudd had been cast in the series' dual lead roles, with Greenberg serving as showrunner, executive producer, and writer of all eight episodes. The series premiered on October 18, 2019, receiving a Golden Globe nomination for Rudd's performance, along with a Writer's Guild Nomination for Greenberg's scripts.

In 2023, it was announced that Greenberg is developing Lodi starring Ewan McGregor for Amazon.

== Personal life ==
He grew up in Montclair, NJ and graduated from Montclair High School, before attending Dartmouth College. He has been married to Danielle Venokur since August 13, 2009.
