= Taylor Ortega =

American actress

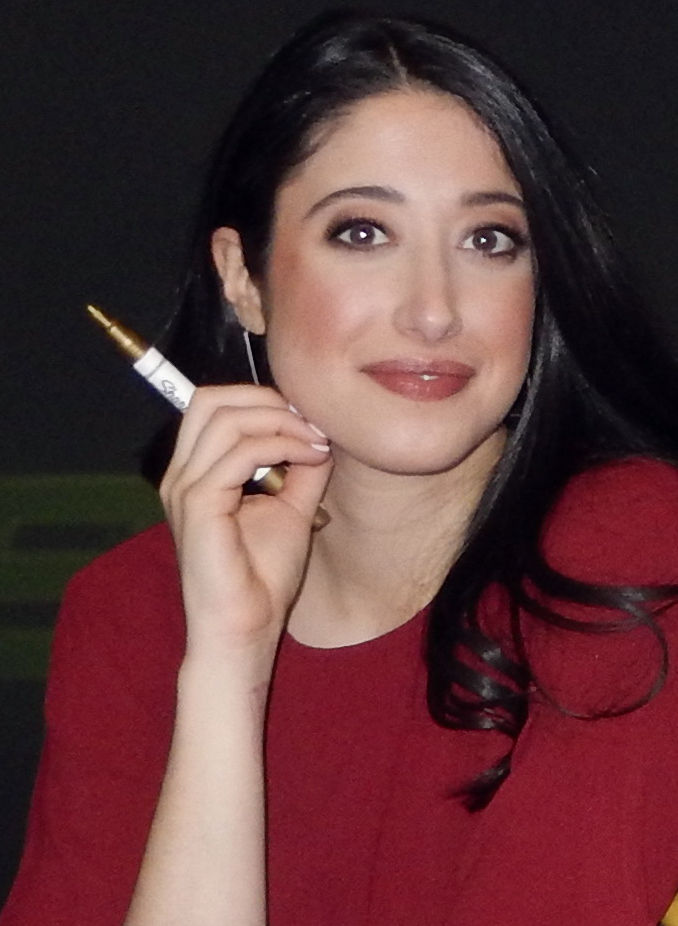
- Born: May 26, 1989 (age 37); Cranbury, New Jersey, U.S.
- Occupations: Actress; comedian
- Years active: 2014–present

Taylor Ortega (born May 26, 1989) is an American actress and comedian. She starred in the series Welcome to Flatch (2022–2023) and Big Mistakes (2026–).

== Early life and career ==
Ortega was born in New Jersey to an Italian-American family and raised there in Cranbury and East Windsor. She received her bachelor's degree from Columbia University.

Ortega's first television role was on Succession. She also acted in the television film Kim Possible, the television series Love Life, What We Do in the Shadows, Ghosts, Jackpot, and The Four Seasons, and the film Another Simple Favor. She is a main cast member on the mockumentary sitcom Welcome to Flatch and the Netflix crime comedy Big Mistakes.

== Filmography ==
=== Film ===
Year	Title	Role	Notes
2021	After Yang	—	
2021	False Positive	—	Uncredited
2023	Wine Club	Amanda	
2023	Porch Girl	Porch Girl	Short film
2024	Jackpot!	Sleazy Ron's Assistant	
2024	Crazy, Funny, Genius, Hero?	Taylor	Short film
2025	Another Simple Favor	Agent Irene Walker	
2026	Dead End	Emily	Short film
2027	Jackrabbit	Avery	

=== Television ===
Year	Title	Role	Notes
2018	Succession	Greta	Episode: "I Went to Market"
2019	Kim Possible	Shego	TV movie
2019	Kim Hushable	Shego	Miniseries, episode: "Rare and Well Done"
2019	TablePop	Rose Nylund	Episode: "Golden Girls"
2020	Helpsters	Cindy Triangle	Episode: "Amazing Alie / Hullabaloo Annie"
2020	Love Life	Ramona	Episode: "Magnus Lund Part II"
2022–2023	Welcome to Flatch	Nadine Garcia-Parney	Main cast
2023	Party Down	Steph	Episode: "Once Upon a Time"
2024	What We Do in the Shadows	Nancy	Episode: "Laszlo's Father"
2024–2025	The Everything Now Show	Herself	2 episodes
2024–2026	Universal Basic Guys	Leanne DelVecchio	Voice role
2025	The Four Seasons	Rachel	Episode: "Ski Trip"
2025–2026	Ghosts	Joan	Recurring role (seasons 4–5)
2026	Big Mistakes	Morgan	Main cast

== Accolades ==
- 2019, Just For Laughs New Faces
