= Dan Levy (Canadian actor) =

Canadian actor and filmmaker (born 1983)

Dan Levy CM
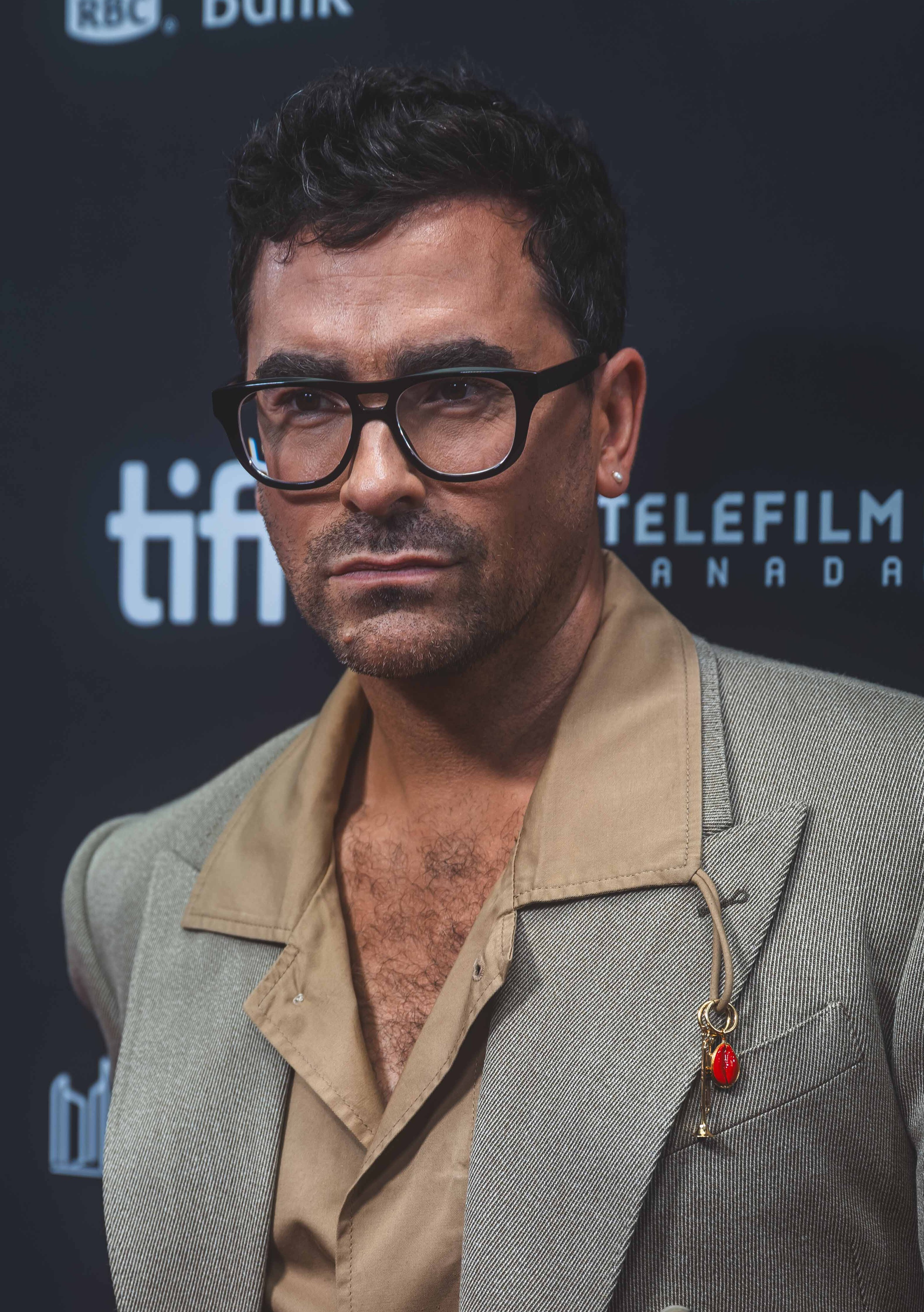
- Levy in 2025
- Born: Daniel Joseph Levy; August 9, 1983 (age 43); Toronto, Ontario, Canada
- Occupations: Actor; screenwriter; producer; director; television host
- Years active: 2006–present
- Father: Eugene Levy
- Relatives: Sarah Levy (sister)

Daniel Joseph Levy (born August 9, 1983) is a Canadian actor, writer, producer and director. He began his career as a television host on MTV Canada. He attained international prominence for starring as David Rose in the CBC sitcom Schitt's Creek (2015–2020), which he co-created and co-starred in with his father, Eugene Levy.

Levy won Primetime Emmy Awards for producing, writing, directing, and acting in the final season of Schitt's Creek, and the series became the first to win a Primetime Emmy Award in all four major comedy acting categories in a single year. His work on the show also earned him four Canadian Screen Awards, among other accolades. Levy has since starred in, wrote, and directed the drama film Good Grief (2023), and starred in and co-created the television series Big Mistakes (2026).

== Early life ==
Levy was born in Toronto, to Eugene Levy and Deborah Divine. His father is Jewish and his mother is Protestant. Levy had a bar mitzvah, and his family celebrates both Christmas and Hanukkah. He attended high school at North Toronto Collegiate Institute and later pursued film production at York University and Ryerson University.

== Career ==
=== 2006–2012: Early work ===
Levy began his career as one of the original seven co-hosts on the now-defunct MTV Canada flagship series MTV Live. He gained prominence as co-host (with Jessi Cruickshank) of MTV Canada's The After Show and its various incarnations, such as The Hills: The After Show and The City: Live After Show. The shows were occasionally broadcast in the United States as well.

Following The After Show's cancellation and Cruickshank's departure, Levy wrote, produced, and starred in his own Christmas special for MTV, Daniel Levy's Holi-Do's & Don'ts. He also co-hosted the MTV Movie Awards Red Carpet, the X-Factor pre-show, and national coverage of the Vancouver 2010 Winter Olympics for CTV. He also ran a leg of the Olympic torch relay. He left MTV Canada in 2011 after five years with the network.

As an actor, he has appeared in a four-episode story arc of the Canadian TV series Degrassi: The Next Generation, which premiered as a TV movie called Degrassi Goes Hollywood. In his Degrassi arc, he played a film producer who hires Paige Michalchuk as the lead in a new film directed by actor Jason Mewes. He also appeared in the 2012 thriller Cyberstalker, and in the 2013 comedy-drama film Admission starring Tina Fey and Paul Rudd.

=== 2015–2020: Schitt's Creek ===
In 2015, Levy formed Not a Real Company Productions (with his father Eugene Levy and principals Andrew Barnsley and Fred Levy). Their first project was a television pilot with CBC, which resulted in Schitt's Creek. Levy starred in the series alongside his father, sister Sarah Levy, Catherine O'Hara, Annie Murphy, and Chris Elliott. Schitt's Creek is Not a Real Company Productions' first television series. Levy has spoken publicly about his character's portrayal of pansexuality, saying, "I think in certain parts of America, David's sexual ambiguity was a big question mark. (But) it was issues like that that I find quite exciting."

For his work on Schitt's Creek, Levy has been nominated for numerous awards, including several Canadian Screen Awards for writing and acting, winning the awards for Best Comedy Series, Best Writing in a Comedy Program or Series in 2016, and Best Comedy Series in 2019. In 2019, the series was nominated for the Primetime Emmy Award for Outstanding Comedy Series. In March 2019, Levy announced that the series was renewed for a sixth and final season, and said the decision to end the series after season six on their own creative terms was a "rare privilege".

In July 2017, it was announced that Levy would host The Great Canadian Baking Show with Julia Chan, which had its premiere on November 1 on CBC. On October 30, John Doyle of The Globe and Mail criticized the show's first episode in a review, including a critique of Levy's "feyness" while performing as host. While acknowledging the importance of criticism in media, Levy called the use of the word feyness "offensive, irresponsible, and homophobic". The Globe's public editor Sylvia Stead published a statement on November 9 explaining that "Mr. Doyle was not aware that Mr. Levy was gay and he used the term to mean preciousness". She also acknowledged that, despite the dictionary not defining "fey" as a slur, "we need to understand not just the context of words, but how they evolve and are viewed by communities that may be justly sensitive to a range of meanings." Levy and Chan returned as hosts for the series' second season, which premiered in September 2018. In March 2019, Levy announced via Twitter that he and Chan would not be returning as hosts for the series' third season, citing scheduling conflicts.

In May 2019, he was the keynote speaker at The Infatuation's annual food festival, EEEEEATSCON.

In June 2019, to mark the 50th anniversary of the Stonewall riots that sparked the start of the modern LGBTQ rights movement, Queerty named him one of the Pride50 "trailblazing individuals who actively ensure society remains moving towards equality, acceptance and dignity for all queer people".

In January 2020, he and his father Eugene Levy were guest hosts of The Ellen DeGeneres Show, filling in for DeGeneres while she took a day off. They did many of the ordinary host activities including interviewing fellow Schitt's Creek cast members Catherine O'Hara and Annie Murphy.

In July 2020, Schitt's Creek was nominated for 15 Primetime Emmy Awards for its final season, with Levy winning Outstanding Comedy Series, Outstanding Supporting Actor in a Comedy Series, Outstanding Writing for a Comedy Series, and Outstanding Directing for a Comedy Series. It became the first comedy series to sweep the four main acting categories in a single year, the first comedy or drama series to win all seven major awards in a single year, and the most-awarded comedy in a single year, beating The Marvelous Mrs. Maisel's record. Levy also became the first person to win an award in all four major disciplines in a single year.

=== 2020–present: Post-Schitt's Creek ===
In August 2020, Levy enrolled in and began to promote the 12-week self-paced Massive Open Online Course (MOOC), "Indigenous Canada", hosted by Tracy Bear (Montreal Lake First Nation) and Paul Gareau (Métis and French Canadian) of the University of Alberta. Levy also hosted twelve livestream interviews with the course instructors and weekly guest speakers to discuss topics related to each of the 12 course modules. Levy said in a tweet on November 15, 2020, that the weekly discussions were "nothing short of transformational". Levy also encouraged followers of and participants in the course to donate to the University of Alberta's Faculty of Native Studies, the only faculty of its kind in North America, promising to match donations up to $25,000.

In September 2020, Levy starred alongside Bette Midler, Kaitlyn Dever, Sarah Paulson, and Issa Rae in the HBO television film Coastal Elites. The project was shot remotely and focused on the lives of five individuals navigating the COVID-19 pandemic.

On February 6, 2021, Levy hosted Saturday Night Live with Grammy-nominated musician Phoebe Bridgers as the musical guest.

In September 2019, Levy signed a three-year deal with ABC Signature. In September 2021, it was announced that Levy had signed an overall deal with Netflix to write and produce scripted content across film and TV. Good Grief, Levy's directorial debut, was released in limited theaters on December 29, 2023, and released on Netflix on January 5, 2024. The film stars Levy, Ruth Negga, Luke Evans, Himesh Patel, Celia Imrie, David Bradley, and Arnaud Valois. Levy described the film as "a love story about friendship".

In 2025, Levy produced the feature documentary Lilith Fair: Building a Mystery – The Untold Story about the legacy of the groundbreaking all-female music festival.

== Personal life ==
Levy divides his time between Toronto and Los Angeles, though he has said that London is his "favourite city" after having lived there in 2005.

He initially avoided labelling his sexual orientation publicly, though in a 2015 interview with Flare he was called "a member of the LGBT community". In a 2020 interview with Andy Cohen, Levy said that he is "obviously gay" and has been out since he was 18.

In October 2026, Levy criticized comedian Shane Gillis in an Instagram video for a joke in Gillis's Saturday Night Live monologue: "I haven't been to the gym in so long, I didn't know women just dress like whores now." In the same video, he said that women were "superior human beings to men."

== Filmography ==
=== Film ===
Year	Title	Role	Notes	Ref.
2012	Cyberstalker	Jack Dayton / Unknown Man	Credited as Daniel Levy	
2013	Admission	James	Credited as Daniel Joseph Levy	
2014	Stage Fright	Entertainment Reporter		
2017	Robot Bullies	Robot 1	Short film	
2020	Happiest Season	John		
2023	Haunted Mansion	Vic		
2023	Good Grief	Marc Dreyfus	Also director, writer and producer	
2024	Unfrosted	Andy Warhol		
2025	Smurfs	Joel (voice)	Credited as Daniel Levy	
2025	Lilith Fair: Building a Mystery	Himself	Also producer; documentary film	
2026	At the Sea	Peter		
2027	Animal Friends	TBA	Post-production	

=== Television ===
Year	Title	Role	Notes	Ref.
2006–2010	The Hills: Live After Show	Himself / Host	Also writer and producer	
2006–2011	MTV Live	Himself / Host		
2009	Degrassi Goes Hollywood	Robbie	Television film	
2010	Daniel Levy's Holi-Do's & Don'ts	Himself	Television special Also writer and producer	
2015	Canada's Smartest Person	Himself / Judge	Episode #2.6	
2015–2020	Schitt's Creek	David Rose	80 episodes Also co-creator, writer, director, and producer	
2017–2018	The Great Canadian Baking Show	Himself / Host	16 episodes	
2018	Modern Family	Jonah	Episode: "A Sketchy Area"	
2019	The Kacey Musgraves Christmas Show	Narrator	Television film	
2020	Dishmantled	Himself / Judge	Episode: "Holy Schitt!"	
2020	Coastal Elites	Mark Hesterman	Television film	
2021	Saturday Night Live	Himself / Host	Episode: "Dan Levy/Phoebe Bridgers"	
2021	Q-Force	Chasten (voice)	2 episodes	
2022	The Big Brunch	Himself / Host	Also creator and executive producer	
2023	The Idol	Benjamin	Episode: "Pop Tarts & Rat Tales"	
2023	Sex Education	Mr. Molloy	4 episodes	
2024	Curb Your Enthusiasm	Abe Zeckelman	Episode: "Fish Stuck"	
2024	76th Primetime Emmy Awards	Host	Television special	
2026	Big Mistakes	Nicky	Also co-creator and executive producer	

=== Music video ===
Year	Title	Artist	Role	Ref.
2005	"Behind These Hazel Eyes"	Kelly Clarkson	Wedding Guest	

== Awards and nominations ==
In 2023, he was named a Member of the Order of Canada.
