= 17th CableACE Awards =

The 17th Annual CableACE Awards were held on December 6, 1995. Below are the nominees and winners from that ceremony in the major categories.

== Winners and nominees ==
Winners in bold.

=== Movie or Miniseries ===
- **Citizen X** (HBO)
- The Burning Season (HBO)
- Choices of the Heart: The Margaret Sanger Story (Lifetime)
- Indictment: The McMartin Trial (HBO)
- Kingfish: A Story of Huey P. Long (TNT)

=== Actor in a Movie or Miniseries ===
- **Raúl Juliá** – The Burning Season (HBO)
- John Goodman – Kingfish: A Story of Huey P. Long (TNT)
- Tommy Lee Jones – The Good Old Boys (TNT)
- Raúl Juliá – Down Came a Blackbird (Showtime)
- James Woods – Indictment: The McMartin Trial (HBO)

=== Actress in a Movie or Miniseries ===
- **Linda Hamilton** – A Mother's Prayer (USA)
- Laura Dern – Down Came a Blackbird (Showtime)
- Marlee Matlin – Against Her Will: The Carrie Buck Story (Lifetime)
- Vanessa Redgrave – Down Came a Blackbird (Showtime)
- Mercedes Ruehl – Indictment: The McMartin Trial (HBO)

=== Supporting Actor in a Movie or Miniseries ===
- **Jeffrey DeMunn** – Citizen X (HBO)
- Robert Carlyle – Cracker (Episode: "To Be a Somebody") (A&E)
- Tony Haygarth – The Infiltrator (HBO)
- Ben Kingsley – Joseph (TNT)
- Max Von Sydow – Citizen X (HBO)

=== Supporting Actress in a Movie or Miniseries ===
- **Jean Marsh** – Fatherland (HBO)
- Lolita Davidovich – Indictment: The McMartin Trial (HBO)
- Shirley Knight – Indictment: The McMartin Trial (HBO)
- Kay Lenz – Shame II: The Secret (Lifetime)
- Diana Rigg – Screen Two (Episode: "Genghis Cohn") (A&E)

=== Directing a Movie or Miniseries ===
- **John Frankenheimer** – The Burning Season (HBO)
- Tim Fywell – Cracker (Episode: "To Be a Somebody") (A&E)
- Chris Gerolmo – Citizen X (HBO)
- Mick Jackson – Indictment: The McMartin Trial (HBO)
- Jean Stewart – Cracker (Episode: "Men Should Weep") (A&E)

=== Writing for a Movie or Miniseries ===
- **Stanley Price** – Screen Two (Episode: "Genghis Cohn") (A&E)
- Joseph Dougherty – Witch Hunt (HBO)
- Chris Gerolmo – Citizen X (HBO)
- John Hopkins and Toshiro Ishido – Hiroshima (Showtime)
- Jimmy McGovern – Cracker (Episode: "To Be a Somebody") (A&E)

=== Comedy Series ===
- **The Larry Sanders Show** (HBO)
- Dream On (HBO)
- Exit 57 (Comedy Central)
- The State (MTV)

=== Actor in a Comedy Series ===
- **Garry Shandling** – The Larry Sanders Show (HBO)
- Brian Benben – Dream On (HBO)
- Howie Mandel – Howie Mandel's Sunny Skies (Showtime)
- Jeffrey Tambor – The Larry Sanders Show (HBO)
- Rip Torn – The Larry Sanders Show (HBO)

=== Actress in a Comedy Series ===
- **Wendie Malick** – Dream On (HBO)
- Denny Dillon – Dream On (HBO)
- Janeane Garofalo – The Larry Sanders Show (HBO)
- Jodi Lennon – Exit 57 (Comedy Central)
- Amy Sedaris – Exit 57 (Comedy Central)

=== Directing a Comedy Series ===
- **Todd Holland** – The Larry Sanders Show (Episode: "Doubt of the Benefit") (HBO)
- Robby Benson – Dream On (Episode: "Try Not to Remember") (HBO)
- Robert Ginty – Dream On (Episode: "Bess, You Is Not My Woman Now") (HBO)
- John Landis – Dream On (Episode: "The Courtship of Martin's Father") (HBO)
- Alan Myerson – The Larry Sanders Show (Episode: "Arthur's Crisis") (HBO)

=== Writing a Comedy Series ===
- **Drake Sather, Garry Shandling, and Peter Tolan** – The Larry Sanders Show (Episode: "Doubt of the Benefit") (HBO)
- H. Jon Benjamin, Loren Bouchard, Bill Braudis, Dom Irrera, Jonathan Katz, Karen LeBlanc, Annette LeBlanc Cate, Will Lebow, Richard Luongo, Andre Lyman, Julianne Shapiro, Laura Silverman, Tom Snyder, and Mark Usher – Dr. Katz, Professional Therapist (Comedy Central)
- Maya Forbes – The Larry Sanders Show (Episode: "The Fourteenth Floor") (HBO)
- Maya Forbes, Steve Levitan, and Garry Shandling – The Larry Sanders Show (Episode: "Roseanne's Return") (HBO)
- Paul Simms – The Larry Sanders Show (Episode: "Hank's Divorce") (HBO)

=== Dramatic Series ===
- **The Outer Limits** (Showtime)
- Avonlea (Disney Channel)
- Tales From the Crypt (HBO)
- The Showtime 30-Minute Movie (Showtime)

=== Dramatic or Theatrical Special ===
- **Cosmic Slop** (Episode: "Space Traders") (HBO)
- Cosmic Slop (Episode: "Tang") (HBO)
- Cosmic Slop (Episode: "The First Commandment") (HBO)
- Tokyo Bound (International Channel)

=== Actor in a Dramatic Special or Series ===
- **John Hurt** – Picture Windows (Episode: "Two Nudes Bathing") (Showtime)
- Beau Bridges – The Outer Limits (Episode: "The Sandkings") (Showtime)
- Larry Drake – The Outer Limits (Episode: "The Message") (Showtime)
- Kiefer Sutherland – Fallen Angels (Episode: "Love and Blood") (Showtime)
- Jim True – The Showtime 30-Minute Movie (Episode: "Two Over Easy") (Showtime)

=== Actress in a Dramatic Special or Series ===
- **Paula Jai Parker** – Cosmic Slop (Episode: "Tang") (HBO)
- Jackie Burroughs – Avonlea (Disney Channel)
- Jennifer Grey – Fallen Angels (Episode: "A Dime a Dance") (Showtime)
- Isabella Rossellini – Tales From the Crypt (Episode: "You, Murderer") (HBO)
- Helen Shaver – The Outer Limits (Episode: "The Sandkings") (Showtime)

=== Directing a Dramatic Special or Series ===
- **Stuart Gillard** – The Outer Limits (Episode: "The Sandkings") (Showtime)
- Jim McBride – Fallen Angels (Episode: "Fearless") (Showtime)
- Patricia Resnick – The Showtime 30-Minute Movie (Episode: "Grandpa's Funeral") (Showtime)
- Steven Soderbergh – Fallen Angels (Episode: "Professional Man") (Showtime)
- Robert Zemeckis – Tales From the Crypt (Episode: "You, Murderer") (HBO)

=== Writing a Dramatic Special or Series ===
- **Patricia Resnick** – The Showtime 30-Minute Movie (Episode: "Grandpa's Funeral") (Showtime)
- John Boorman – Picture Windows (Episode: "Two Nudes Bathing") (Showtime)
- Trey Ellis – Cosmic Slop (Episode: "Space Traders") (HBO)
- Ted Henning and Stephen Kay – The Showtime 30-Minute Movie (Episode: "Two Over Easy") (Showtime)
- Frank Pugliese – Fallen Angels (Episode: "Love and Blood") (Showtime)

=== Animated Special or Series ===
- **Dr. Katz, Professional Therapist** (Comedy Central)
- Duckman (USA)
- Rocko's Modern Life (Nickelodeon)
- Rugrats (Nickelodeon)

=== Comedy Special ===
- **HBO Comedy Hour** (Episode: "Kathy & Mo: The Dark Side") (HBO)
- South Bank Show (Episode: "British Comedy Special") (Bravo)
- South Bank Show (Episode: "Dawn French and Large Women") (Bravo)
- South Bank Show (Episode: "Lenny Henry: African-American Humor") (Bravo)
- State of the Union: Undressed (Comedy Central)

=== Standup Comedy Special or Series ===
- **Full Frontal Comedy** (Showtime)
- A&E's An Evening at the Improv (A&E)
- HBO Comedy Hour (Episode: "Rosie O'Donnell") (HBO)
- HBO Comedy Hour (Episode: "Women of the Night IV Hosted by Tracey Ullman") (HBO)
- The Mommies: My Kid Beat Up Your Honor Student (Showtime)

=== Performance in a Comedy Special ===
- **Mo Gaffney** and **Kathy Najimy** – HBO Comedy Hour (Episode: "Kathy & Mo: The Dark Side") (HBO)
- Danny Bonaduce, Franklin Cover, Frank Gorshin, Robert Hegyes, Sherman Hemsley, Lawrence Hilton-Jacobs, Shirley Jones, Dave Madden, Ron Palillo, Isabel Sanford, and Adam West – 1995 MTV Movie Awards (MTV)
- Karen Hines – Married Life (Comedy Central)
- Dennis Miller – State of the Union: Undressed (Comedy Central)

=== Directing a Comedy Special ===
- **Anthony Morina** – The Clinic (Comedy Central)
- Ken Finkleman – Married Life (Comedy Central)
- Vince Paterson – In Search of Dr. Seuss (TNT)

=== News Special or Series ===
- **Rwanda: Cry Justice** (CNN International)
- CNN Presents (Episode: "America Mourns") (CNN)
- CNN Presents (Episode: "Kingdom of Cocaine") (CNN)
- New Religions: The Cult Question (MTV)
- Vietnam: Coming to Terms (CNN)

=== Talk Show Series ===
- **Politically Incorrect with Bill Maher** (Comedy Central)
- Ask E. Jean (America's Talking)
- Charles Grodin (CNBC)
- Four on the Floor (VH1)
- Inside the Actors Studio (Bravo)

=== Documentary Series ===
- **Desmond Morris' The Human Animal** (TLC)
- 20th Century (A&E)
- A Baby's World (TLC)
- Biography (A&E)
- VH1 to 1 (VH1)

=== Entertainment Host ===
- **Garry Shandling** – HBO Comedy Hour (Episode: "The 1995 Young Comedians Special") (HBO)
- Bobby Collins – Stand Up Spotlight (VH1)
- John Henson – Talk Soup (E!)
- Bill Maher – Politically Incorrect with Bill Maher (Comedy Central)
- Dennis Miller – Dennis Miller Live (HBO)

=== Writing an Entertainment Special ===
- **Jeff Cesario, Ed Driscoll, David Feldman, Eddie Feldmann, Greg Greenburg, and Kevin Rooney** – Dennis Miller Live (Episode: "America: Where Did Our Sense of Humor Go?") (HBO)
- Trace Beaulieu, Paul Chaplin, Jim Mallon, Kevin Murphy, Michael J. Nelson, Mary Jo Pehl – The MST3K Little Gold Statue Preview Special (Comedy Central)
- Rosie O'Donnell – HBO Comedy Hour (Episode: "Rosie O'Donnell") (HBO)
- Marilyn Kentz and Caryl Kristensen – The Mommies: My Kid Beat Up Your Honor Student (Showtime)
- Rita Rudner – HBO Comedy Hour (Episode: "Rita Rudner: Married Without Children") (HBO)

=== Program Interviewer ===
- **Jane Wallace** – Under Scrutiny with Jane Wallace (FX)
- Larry King – Larry King Live (CNN)
- Cal Thomas – Cal Thomas (CNBC)

=== Sports Information Series ===
- **MTV Sports** (MTV)
- Inside the NFL (HBO)
- The Sporting Life With Jim Huber (CNN)
- The Sports Reporters (ESPN)
- Up Close: Primetime (ESPN)

=== Sports Host ===
- **Keith Olbermann** – SportsCenter (ESPN)
- Chris Berman (ESPN)
- Jim Lampley (HBO)
- Dan Patrick (ESPN)
- Al Trautwig (Madison Square Garden Network)

=== Sports Commentator/Analyst ===
- **Dick Schaap** – The Sports Reporters (ESPN)
- Doug Collins (TNT)
- Peter Gammons (ESPN)
- Dick Vitale (ESPN)
