= Caryl & Marilyn: Real Friends =

American daytime talk/variety show

- Starring: Caryl Kristensen; Marilyn Kentz
- Country of origin: United States

Production
- Running time: 60 minutes
- Production company: Viacom Productions

Original release
- Network: ABC
- Release: June 10, 1996 – May 30, 1997

Caryl & Marilyn: Real Friends is an hour-long daytime talk/variety show which ran on ABC from June 10, 1996, to May 30, 1997. The series was produced by Viacom Productions.

== Details ==
The program was hosted by Marilyn Kentz and Caryl Kristensen, who gained fame as the comedy duo known as The Mommies. The show offered lighter fare which consisted of humor, celebrity guests, cooking segments, fashion tips and health issues.

The two hosts did not want to use the "Mommies" name for this series, as they had for their previous television effort (a short-lived sitcom for NBC which was produced by Viacom's Paramount Network Television), for they wanted to use their longtime friendship as the basis for the show.

The program was stunted by heavy preemptions or relocation to overnight timeslots by ABC affiliates that had been displeased by the network's previous midday lifestyle programming, The Home Show and Mike and Maty, in addition to tough competition from CBS's longtime ratings powerhouse The Price Is Right.

It also had the disadvantage of being produced by an outside distributor in Viacom, which meant ABC had little to no input on the program's content. The ratings never improved at all from ABC's previous efforts, and the program was canceled two weeks before the first anniversary of its premiere to be replaced by The View, a program featuring ABC News's Barbara Walters and completely under the purview of ABC itself, which has remained in the time slot since.

== In popular culture ==
On the HBO series The Larry Sanders Show, Paula, the talent booker, threatened to leave the show after getting an offer to produce Caryl & Marilyn. However, it is not discussed if Paula actually took the job.
