= Mary Beth Barone =

American comedian and actress

- Born: May 28, 1991 (age 35); Stamford, Connecticut, U.S.
- Education: Boston College (dropped out)
- Occupations: Comedian; actress
- Years active: 2015–present

Comedy career
- Medium: Television; stand-up
- Genres: Observational comedy; dry humor; feminist comedy
- Subjects: Sex; sexuality; dating; religion; politics; science; family; socialism; white privilege; class privilege; patriarchy

Mary Elizabeth Barone (born May 28, 1991) is an American comedian and actress. As of 2025, she stars as Grace on Benito Skinner's Amazon Prime Video comedy series Overcompensating (2025–present), for which she also writes, and co-hosts the Dear Media podcast Ride (2023–present) with Skinner. The two also previously co-hosted the Spotify podcast Obsessed (2021–2023).

Barone began her comedy career in New York City in 2015 after working with the Upright Citizens Brigade. She became known for her live show Drag His Ass: A Fuckboy Treatment Program, which was created in 2019 and adapted into a Comedy Central web series in 2021.

== Early life ==
Barone was born on May 28, 1991, and raised in a Catholic family of Italian descent in Stamford, Connecticut, with five older siblings. Her father, James E. Barone, Sr. (1945–2025), worked as a surgeon and briefly performed as a stand-up comedian in New York City in the 1970s. She attended Catholic school in Greenwich for 10 years and later graduated from Westhill High School in Stamford. She was raised in a Republican household and identified as a Republican prior to attending college. She began studying English at Boston College, but dropped out two years later and moved to Chinatown, Manhattan, at age 20, where she lived for several years.

== Career ==
While working at a start-up, Barone took two months of improv classes at the Upright Citizens Brigade before doing stand-up during an all-women open mic for the group in 2015, after which she decided to pursue comedy full-time. A humorous "frequently asked questions" pamphlet she created to answer her family's anticipated questions about a date she was going on while on vacation in Florida went viral on Twitter in May 2019. She met fellow comedian Benito Skinner in 2019 at a comedy show in Bushwick, Brooklyn, and began hosting a monthly comedy show with him that year. Also in 2019, she performed a stand-up set for Comedy Central and started the Instagram account and Brooklyn–based live comedy show Drag His Ass: A Fuckboy Treatment Program. In May 2021, Drag His Ass had been adapted into a Comedy Central web series. During the COVID-19 pandemic, she started Coming Clean, a livestreamed comedy show on Instagram filmed from her bathtub.

Barone and Skinner co-hosted the weekly Spotify podcast Obsessed, in which they discussed their pop culture "obsessions", from March 2021 to March 2023. Also in March 2021, Barone performed for the first time on The Tonight Show Starring Jimmy Fallon. She and Skinner began co-hosting the weekly Dear Media podcast Ride in March 2023. The Atlantic included it on their list of the best podcasts of 2023. In March 2024, she released her self-produced stand-up special, Thought Provoking, on YouTube, and performed on The Tonight Show with Jimmy Fallon to promote it. Barone started the social media video series Politics for Hot People, which focused on progressive politics, in February 2025. During the 2025 New York City mayoral election, she endorsed Democratic candidate Zohran Mamdani and interviewed him on Politics for Hot People.

In 2025, Barone began starring in Skinner's Amazon Prime Video series Overcompensating, adapted from his live show of the same name, as Grace, an uptight and popular college student at the fictional Yates University and the older sister of Benny, a closeted freshman at Yates played by Skinner. She is also a writer for the series. Henry Chandonnet of The Daily Beast called her a "series standout" and one of several "genuine breakouts" on the show, while Robert Lloyd of the Los Angeles Times called her role "poignant" and "perhaps the show's most moving performance". Barone co-starred on the music video for the song "Wild Guess" by Australian singer-songwriter Ruel, which premiered in October 2025.

Barone's first hour-long comedy special Galaxy Brain premiered on July 28, 2026, on Netflix. The special was taped on March 19, 2026, at the Skirball Center for the Performing Arts in New York City. The Guardian's Owen Myers described the special as "55 minutes of whip-smart laughs that tackle all the no-nos of polite dinner party conversation".

== Personal life ==
Barone is bisexual. By 2021, she was dating actor Edward Bluemel. She announced a break up with actor Adam DiMarco during an appearance on Late Night with Seth Meyers in July 2025.

== Comedic style ==
In 2018, Time Out New York described Barone's comedic style as "dark post-modernism". Her comedy has been described as deadpan, observational, feminist, sex-positive, and focused on topics such as sex, bisexuality, religion, white privilege, the patriarchy, and "fuckboys". Vulture described her as "the undisputed queen of hot girl comedy" in 2020. She has listed Victoria Beckham, Lucille Ball, Mary-Kate and Ashley Olsen, and her father as influences on her comedy.

== Filmography ==
Key
†	Denotes works that have not yet been released

=== Film ===
Year	Title	Role	Notes
2017	Mary Beth's Sex Tape	Mary Beth	Short film; also writer and co-producer
2022	Supernigga	Jessica	Short film
2023	The Anne Frank Gift Shop	Madison	Short film
2024	The Disruptors	Mary Beth	
2024	Sugar Baby	Marie	Also executive producer
TBA	Love Love †		Filming

=== Television ===
Year	Title	Role	Notes
2022	That Damn Michael Che	Party Planner #1	Episode: "Black Mediocrity"
2023	Black Mirror	Lucy	Episode: "Joan Is Awful"
2025–present	Overcompensating	Grace	Main cast; also staff writer

=== Music videos ===
Year	Title	Artist(s)	Notes	Ref.
2025	"Wild Guess"	Ruel	Female lead; directed by Jackie! Zhou	
