= Much Ado About Nothing (1973 film) =

1973 Soviet film by Samson Samsonov

- Directed by: Samson Samsonov
- Written by: Samson Samsonov
- Based on: Much Ado About Nothing; 1600 play by William Shakespeare
- Starring: Galina Jovovich; Konstantin Raikin; Tatyana Vedeneyeva
- Cinematography: Yevgeniy Guslinsky
- Edited by: Galina Spirina
- Music by: Igor Yegikov; Mikhail Bits
- Production company: Mosfilm
- Release date: 1973
- Running time: 83 minutes
- Country: Soviet Union
- Language: Russian

Much Ado About Nothing (Russian: Много шума из ничего, romanized: Mnogo shuma iz nichego) is a 1973 Soviet romantic comedy film directed by Samson Samsonov based on William Shakespeare's play of the same name.

Kinoglaz reports that the film had 15 millions spectators.

== Plot ==
A young couple, Hero and Claudio, are set to be married in a week. As time passes, they make a wager with Don Pedro that they can bring the confirmed bachelor Benedick together with Beatrice, an old acquaintance of his. Meanwhile, the villain Don John schemes to disrupt Claudio and Hero’s wedding by accusing Hero of infidelity. The truth seems impossible to uncover, but, fortunately, all this is merely ado... much ado about nothing.

== Cast ==
- Galina Jovovich - Beatrice
- Konstantin Raikin - Benedicto
- Tatyana Vedeneyeva - Gero
- Leonid Trushkin - Claudio
- Boris Ivanov - Leonato
- Alexei Samoilov - Prince
- Vladimir Korenev - Juan
- Alexei Dobronravov - Antonio
- Erast Garin - Kissel
- Pavel Pavlenko - Dogberry
- Vladimir Doveyko Sr. (voiced by Vladimir Basov) - Boracchio
- Mikhail Logvinov - Conrad
- Tatyana Bronzova
- Yury Yakovlev (uncredited)

== Themes and reception ==
Like Kenneth Branagh’s adaptation, the film opens with the men riding into a town where the women run to greet them.

”Known for his adaptations of literature into film, Samsonov teamed up with acclaimed costume designer Ludmila Kusakova to create this Mosfilm classic."
