= Yona Speidel =

American pianist and television writer

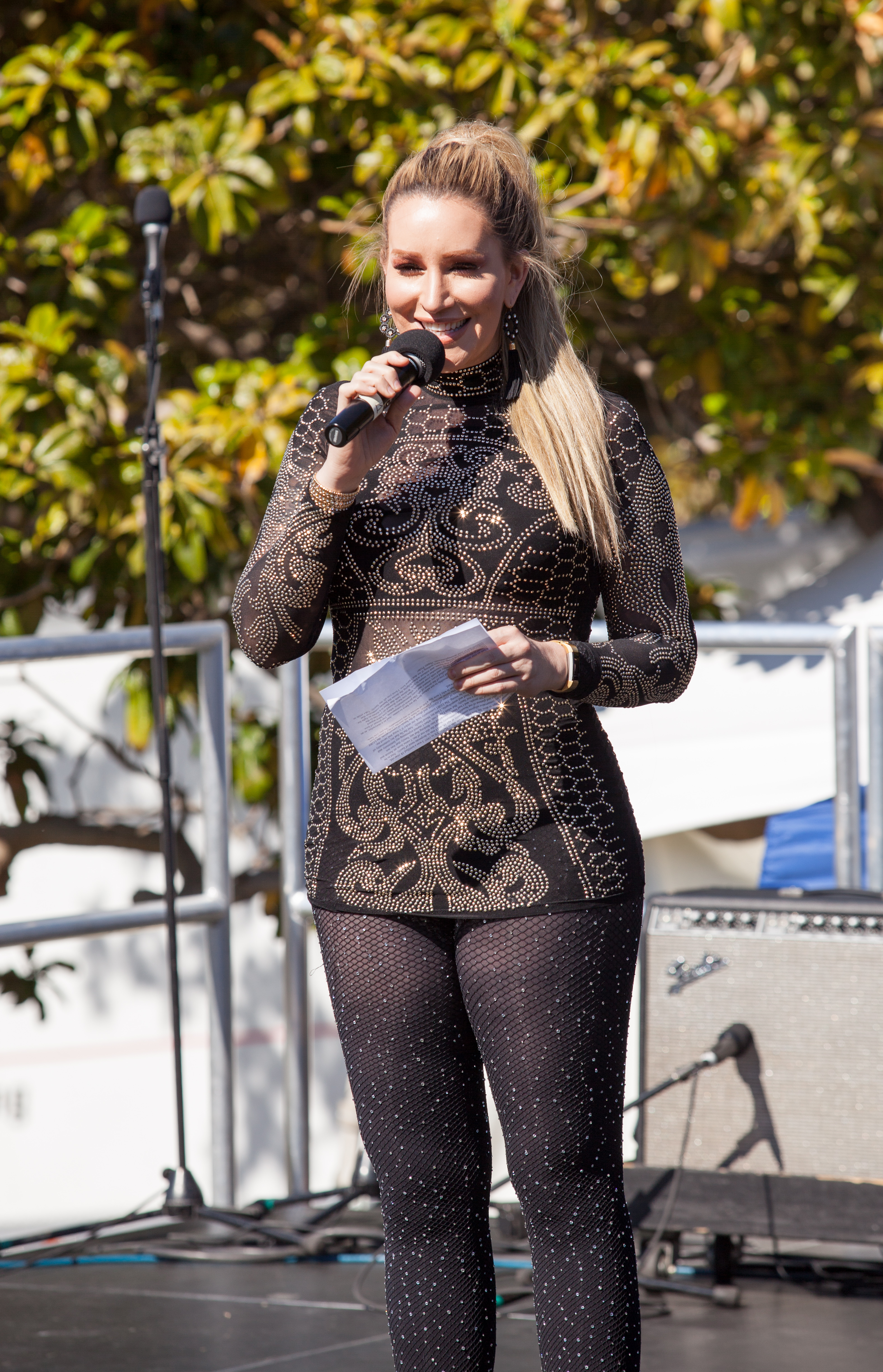
- Our Lady J in 2018
- Born: 1978 (age 47–48); Chambersburg, Pennsylvania, U.S.
- Occupation: Screenwriter
- Website: ourladyj.com

Yona Speidel, also known as Our Lady J, is an American screenwriter and singer-songwriter, best-known for her work on Pose, Transparent, and American Horror Story. She is the first out trans woman to perform at Carnegie Hall, as well as the first out trans writer to be hired in a television writers' room.

== Early life ==
Speidel was born in Chambersburg, Pennsylvania in 1978, growing up in an Amish and Mennonite community. She attended Interlochen Center for the Arts from 1994 to 1996, studying in classical piano and composition during her junior and senior years of high school.

== Early career ==
From 2000 to 2010, Speidel freelanced as a collaborative pianist and musical director in New York City for multiple classical and musical theatre institutions, including American Ballet Theatre, Alvin Ailey American Dance Theater, and the Mark Morris Dance Group. In 2004, Speidel met Lady Gaga at the CAP21 musical-theater conservatory in New York, where she served as an accompanist and music director.

Speidel made her Carnegie Hall debut with the New York City Gay Men's Chorus in 2004, and continued to perform as their pianist until 2007. In 2008, she returned to Carnegie Hall to perform with Justin Vivian Bond in The McGarrigle Christmas Hour concert.

Speidel toured and performed with pop singer Sia from 2012 to 2014.

Speidel released her first studio album in 2013, titled Picture of a Man.

From 2014 to 2015, Speidel performed as a guest musician on RuPaul's Drag Race seasons 6 and 7.

In 2014, Speidel coached Andrew Garfield for Arcade Fire's music video "We Exist". The video is described by Arcade Fire as telling "the story of a young person's struggle with gender identity", depicting Garfield as a gender-nonconforming person who is assaulted at a bar, but later finds acceptance at an Arcade Fire concert.

== TV and film career ==
In 2014, Joey Soloway hired Speidel as a staff writer for the hit series Transparent, making Speidel the first out trans person to be hired into a Hollywood writers' room. Speidel's episode, "If I Were a Bell", drew international critical acclaim for its authentic portrayal of a trans childhood. During her four seasons working on the series, she was promoted from staff writer to story editor, to co-producer, and then to producer.

In 2017, Ryan Murphy hired Speidel to write and produce the television show Pose. Her contributions to the HIV/AIDS storylines went on to become the center of both critical and audience acclaim.

On two seasons of Transparent and on all three seasons of Pose, Speidel made on-screen musical cameo appearances, performing with Billy Porter, Michaela Jaé Rodriguez, Patti LuPone, and Sandra Bernhard.

In 2020, New Regency teamed with Speidel to develop a pilot based on the life of Dante "Tex" Gill, called Rub & Tug. The story had previously been set up as a feature film with Scarlett Johansson attached, but after outcry from the LGBTQ+ community, Johansson left the project and Speidel was brought on to reimagine the story with authentic casting.

In 2022, Speidel continued her collaboration with Ryan Murphy by writing an episode for season two of American Horror Stories. She then went on to executive produce and write season eleven of American Horror Story, entitled NYC. Speidel made her directorial debut on AHS: NYC episode nine, "Requiem 1981/1987: Part 1".

In late 2022, it was announced that Speidel would develop a comedy series at Hulu with comedians Holmes and Caleb Hearon, on which she will serve as executive producer and showrunner.

== Music career ==
In 2024, Speidel made a return to music with her single, “Future Of Us,” featuring the New York City Gay Men’s Chorus. The song made a notable debut at the 2024 Met Gala.

== Personal life and activism ==
In 2004, Speidel came out as transgender and adopted the name "Our Lady J" as a nod to Jean Genet's subversive novel, Our Lady of the Flowers.

In 2008, Speidel garnered the attention of Dolly Parton by performing her songs, and the two struck up a friendship. In 2010, Parton helped fund Speidel's top surgery, along with Jake Shears, Rosie O'Donnell, Margaret Cho, Tori Amos and others.

In 2009, Speidel became the subject of tabloid fodder for her relationship with actor Daniel Radcliffe. The two were featured in Out discussing their friendship and careers.

During Speidel's first appearance on RuPaul's Drag Race in 2014, RuPaul drew public criticism for using the term "she-male", quickly starting a firestorm about trans-inclusive language within the LGBTQ community. In an article for The Huffington Post, Speidel defended RuPaul, saying "As an artist, I love language, and I cherish free speech. Drag is punk and should never be subjected to politically correct ideals."

From 2015 to 2016, Speidel successfully spearheaded the initiative to include gender affirming care in the Writers Guild of America's health insurance coverage, the first arts guild to cover transgender healthcare. She was quoted in The New York Times as saying, "Having to battle for insurance and having to battle with doctors is overwhelming. Taking care of your health as a trans person can feel like a full-time job". About the season finale of Pose, Speidel said, "I was able to take my own experiences and bring them into this space. It was a challenge, but it was also healing to be able to give that knowledge. And I do hope that viewers are encouraged to get tested and to not be so afraid of what HIV once was." In 2019, she was featured on POZ Magazine's POZ 100 list of HIV/AIDS activists.

In 2019, Speidel joined the board of GLAAD. That same year, she slammed the LA Times for body-shaming her at the Golden Globes, thus ending the LA Times's long-standing history of criticizing women's appearances on red carpets. "When you judge women for what they're wearing, you're not only judging the fabric on their bodies — you are judging their actual bodies, the medical history of their bodies, and the emotional struggle they have with their bodies because of articles like this," Speidel said.

Speidel was a featured speaker at 2021's World AIDS Day National Observance, alongside Anthony Fauci, Office of National AIDS Policy Director Harold Phillips, U.S. Senator Raphael Warnock, and Congresswoman Barbara Lee. That same year, she was awarded the National Leadership Recognition Award by the National AIDS Memorial.

In a March 2026 interview with Jonah Platt, Speidel revealed that she had converted to Judaism the previous day. In 2026, she announced that she was now going by the name Yona Speidel.

== Filmography ==
=== Television ===
Year	Title	Writer	Director	Executive Producer
2015–2017	Transparent	Yes	No	Producer
2018–2021	Pose	Yes	No	Co-Executive
2021	Fantasy Island	Yes	No	No
2022	American Horror Stories	Yes	No	No
2022	American Horror Story: NYC	Yes	Yes	Yes
2025	Doctor Odyssey	No	Yes	No
2026	The Boroughs	Yes	No	Co-Executive

=== Writing ===
Year	Show	Season	Episode	Episode Number	Original Airdate	Notes
2015	Transparent	2	"Mee-Maw"	5	December 11, 2015	Written by
2016	Transparent	2	"If I Were a Bell"	3	September 23, 2016	Written by
2017	Transparent	4	"Pinkwashing Machine"	3	September 22, 2017	Written by
2018	Pose	1	"Pinkslip"	3	July 15, 2018	Co-written with Steven Canals
2018	Pose	1	"Giving and Receiving"	7	June 17, 2018	Co-written with Janet Mock
2019	Pose	2	"Butterfly/Cocoon"	3	June 25, 2019	Written by
2019	Pose	2	"Love's in Need of Love Today"	6	July 23, 2019	Co-written with Brad Falchuk
2019	Pose	2	"Life's a Beach"	9	August 13, 2019	Co-written with Janet Mock
2021	Pose	3	"Intervention"	3	May 2, 2021	Co-written with Steven Canals
2021	Pose	3	"Series Finale (Part I)"	7	June 6, 2021	Co-written with Steven Canals, Janet Mock, Brad Falchuk, Ryan Murphy
2021	Pose	3	"Series Finale (Part II)"	8	June 6, 2021	Co-written with Steven Canals, Janet Mock, Brad Falchuk, Ryan Murphy
2021	Fantasy Island	1	"His and Hers/The Heartbreak Hotel"	2	August 17, 2021	Story by and teleplay by Jane Espenson
2022	American Horror Stories	2	"Milkmaids"	4	August 11, 2022	Written by
2022	American Horror Story	11	"Bad Fortune"	5	November 2, 2022	Written by
2022	American Horror Story	11	"The Body"	6	November 2, 2022	Co-written with Brad Falchuk and Manny Coto
2022	American Horror Story	11	"The Sentinel"	7	November 9, 2022	Co-written with Manny Coto
2022	American Horror Story	11	"Fire Island"	8	November 9, 2022	Co-written with Charlie Carver and Ned Martel
2022	American Horror Story	11	"Requiem 1981/1987: Part 1"	9	November 16, 2022	Written and directed by
2026	The Boroughs	1	"Time To Go"	7	May 21, 2026	Written by

=== Directing ===
Year	Show	Season	Episode	Episode Number	Original Airdate	Notes
2022	American Horror Story	11	"Requiem 1981/1987: Part 1"	9	November 16, 2022	Written and directed by
2025	Doctor Odyssey	1	"Double Booked"	16	May 1, 2025	

=== Acting ===
Year	Show	Episode	Role	Notes
2014	RuPaul's Drag Race	"Shade: The Rusical"	Self	Musical appearance
2015	RuPaul's Drag Race	"Divine Inspiration"	Self	Musical appearance
2015	Transparent	"Kina Hora"	Yorna	Musical appearance
2015	Transparent	"Oscillate"	Yorna	Musical appearance
2015	Transparent	"Man on the Land"	Yorna	Musical appearance
2017	Transparent	"Born Again"	Miss Pico-Union	Musical appearance
2018	Pose	"Love Is the Message"	Sherilyn	Musical appearance
2019	Pose	"Love's in Need of Love Today"	Sherilyn	Musical appearance
2019	Pose: Identity, Family, Community (Inside Look)	Various episodes	Self	
2021	Pose	"Series Finale (Part I)"	Sherilyn	Musical appearance
2021	Pose	"Series Finale (Part II)"	Sherilyn	Musical appearance

=== Music videos ===
Year	Title	Artist	Role
2024	"Days of Girlhood"	Dylan Mulvaney	Pianist

== Awards ==
Speidel has received two Peabody Awards, three American Film Institute awards, three Emmy nominations, three Writers Guild Award nominations, and two NAACP Image Award nominations. As a producer, her shows have garnered a combined total of 48 Emmy nominations, 12 Emmy wins, 13 Golden Globe nominations, 3 Golden Globe wins, 20 Critics' Choice nominations, and 3 Critics' Choice wins, among others.

Award	Year	Work	Category	Result	Ref
Primetime Emmy Awards	2021	Pose	Outstanding Writing for a Drama Series	Nominee	
Primetime Emmy Awards	2021	Pose	Outstanding Drama Series	Nominee	
Primetime Emmy Awards	2019	Pose	Outstanding Drama Series	Nominee	
Writer's Guild Awards	2019	Pose	New Series	Nominee	
Writer's Guild Awards	2017	Transparent	Comedy Series	Nominee	
Writer's Guild Awards	2016	Transparent	Comedy Series	Nominee	
NAACP Image Awards	2022	Pose	Outstanding Writing in a Drama Series	Nominee	
NAACP Image Awards	2017	Transparent	Outstanding Writing in a Drama Series	Nominee	
GLAAD Media Awards	2022	Pose	Outstanding Drama Series	Won	
GLAAD Media Awards	2020	Pose	Outstanding Drama Series	Won	
GLAAD Media Awards	2019	Pose	Outstanding Drama Series	Won	
GLAAD Media Awards	2018	Transparent	Outstanding Comedy Series	Nominated	
GLAAD Media Awards	2017	Transparent	Outstanding Comedy Series	Won	
GLAAD Media Awards	2016	Transparent	Outstanding Comedy Series	Won	
GLAAD Media Awards	2015	Transparent	Outstanding Comedy Series	Won	
Golden Globe Awards	2022	Pose	Best Drama Series	Nominee	
Golden Globe Awards	2019	Pose	Best Drama Series	Nominee	
Golden Globe Awards	2017	Transparent	Best Musical/Comedy Series	Nominee	
Golden Globe Awards	2016	Transparent	Best Musical/Comedy Series	Nominee	
Golden Globe Awards	2015	Transparent	Best Musical/Comedy Series	Won	
Peabody Awards	2018	Pose	Entertainment	Won	
Peabody Awards	2015	Transparent	Entertainment	Won	
American Film Awards	2018	Pose	Top 10 Television Programs	Won	
American Film Awards	2019	Pose	Top 10 Television Programs	Won	
American Film Awards	2014	Transparent	Top 10 Television Programs	Won	
Critic's Choice Awards	2020	Pose	Best Drama Series	Nominated	
Critic's Choice Awards	2019	Pose	Best Drama Series	Nominated	
Critic's Choice Awards	2016	Transparent	Best Comedy Series	Nominated	
Critic's Choice Awards	2015	Transparent	Best Comedy Series	Nominated	
American Film Institute Awards	2014	Transparent	Television Programs of the Year	Won	
Black Reel Awards for Television	2020	Pose	Outstanding Drama Series	Winner	
GALECA: The Society of LGBTQ Entertainment Critics	2019	Pose	TV Musical Performance of the Year	Winner	
International Online Cinema Awards (INOCA)	2021	Pose	Best Writing for a Drama Series	Winner	
Outfest Legacy Awards	2018	Pose	Trailblazer Award	Winner	
Gold Derby Awards	2021	Pose	Drama Episode	Nominated	
Pena de Prata	2021	Pose	Best Drama Series	Nominated	
