= Sam Straley =

American actor

- Born: July 13, 1995 (age 31); Cincinnati, Ohio, U.S.
- Education: DePaul University (BFA)
- Occupation: Actor
- Years active: 2016–present

Sam Straley (born July 13, 1995) is an American actor.

== Early life and education ==
Born and raised in Cincinnati, Ohio, Straley studied in Anderson High School until his graduation in 2013. He graduated from The Theatre School at DePaul University in 2017.

== Career ==
Straley started his acting career in 2016, shortly before graduating from college. He got the roles of Nathan Ward and Tyler Whitlock in the television series Chicago P.D. which was produced by Dick Wolf for Wolf Entertainment.

He played Bully 1 in the sci-fi series Electric Dreams, Archie Kinsler in the film Bernadette alongside Marilyn Bass and James Psathas, and Lawrence Cleary in the television sitcom The Kids Are Alright.

In 2022, Straley starred in the miniseries The Dropout, which premiered on Hulu on March 3, 2022. Also, he was part of the cast of the docu-comedy Welcome to Flatch, which premiered on Fox on March 17, 2022.

== Filmography ==
=== Film ===
Year	Title	Role	Notes
2018	Bernadette	Archie Kinsler	
2019	Hala	Evan	
2019	Teacher	Scott	
2020	Once Upon a River	Billy Murray	

=== Television ===
Year	Title	Role	Notes
2016, 2018	Chicago P.D.	Tyler Whitlock / Nathan Ward	2 episodes
2018	Electric Dreams	Bully 1	Episode: "Safe and Sound"
2018–2019	The Kids Are Alright	Lawrence Cleary	Main role
2020	Chicago Med	Harlan	Episode: "It May Not Be Forever"
2022	The Dropout	Christian Holmes	Recurring role, miniseries
2022–2023	Welcome to Flatch	Lloyd "Shrub" Mallet	Main role; also executive producer
