= Free Time (film) =

- Directed by: Ryan Martin Brown
- Written by: Ryan Martin Brown
- Produced by: Paula González; Mackenzie Jamieson; Nolan Kelly; Justin Zuckerman
- Starring: Colin Burgess; Rajat Suresh; Holmes; Jessie Pinnick; James Webb; Rebecca Bulnes
- Cinematography: Victor Ingles
- Edited by: Ryan Martin Brown; Byron Leon
- Music by: Mason Margut
- Production company: 5th Floor Pictures
- Distributed by: Cartilage Films
- Release date: March 22, 2024 (United States)
- Running time: 78 minutes
- Country: United States
- Language: English

Free Time is an independent American comedy film written and directed by Ryan Martin Brown and starring Colin Burgess. It was released in theaters on March 22, 2024.

== Plot ==
Drew impulsively quits his office job, and then drifts along as he tries to figure out what to do next.

== Cast ==
- Colin Burgess as Drew
- Rajat Suresh as Rajat
- Holmes as Kim
- Jessie Pinnick as The Neighbor
- James Webb as Luke
- Rebecca Bulnes as Laura

== Production ==
Free Time was filmed in New York City in 10 days in the fall of 2021. Brown has said the film was influenced by The Heartbreak Kid and The Jerk. Visually, it was inspired by the work of Éric Rohmer. It was produced by Mackenzie Jamieson, Justin Zuckerman, Nolan Kelly, and Paula Andrea González-Nasser.

== Release ==
After playing at film festivals in 2023, on August 24, 2023, the film was acquired by Cartilage Films. It was released in theaters on March 22, 2024.

== Reception ==
Jordan Mintzer of The Hollywood Reporter called the film a "cleverly concocted and occasionally hilarious tale of Generation Z malaise." Christian Zilko of Indiewire gave it a B−, writing, "Burgess embodies Drew with the prerequisite amount of neuroticism for the lead in such a stereotypically New York movie." Brian Tallerico of RogerEbert.com gave it 3 out of 4 stars, calling it "one of the better indie comedies in a long time, enjoyable from minute one until the final frame, and deceptively insightful about the structure of the modern world, one that encourages us to do more with our free time but doesn't offer much guidance to what exactly we should be doing."
