= Wally Baram =

Larissa Ringor "Wally" Baram (born May 11, 1998) is an American comedian, television writer, and actress.

A native of New Jersey, Baram is of Mexican and Syrian descent. She attended high school in California. She graduated from The Thacher School in 2015. She attended Barnard College to study economics, but would drop out to pursue stand-up comedy.

Baram would appear on a July 2021 episode of The Late Show with Stephen Colbert performing her stand-up. As a writer, she would work on several programs for Brat TV, and would join the writing staff for several series such as Betty, Sprung, What We Do in the Shadows, English Teacher, and Shrinking. Her work on English Teacher and Shrinking would land her nominations for the Writers Guild of America Award for Television: New Series with her fellow writers and producers.

In July 2024, Baram was cast in her acting debut on the Amazon Prime Video series Overcompensating. Her performance earned her a nomination for the Independent Spirit Award for Best Breakthrough Performance.
