= Caleb Hearon =

American comedian (born 1995)

- Hearon in 2026
- Born: January 24, 1995 (age 31); Chillicothe, Missouri, U.S.
- Education: Missouri State University (BA)
- Occupation: stand-up comedian
- Years active: 2016–present
- Website: Official website

Caleb Daniel Hearon (HERR-ən; born January 24, 1995) is an American stand-up comedian, actor and podcaster.

== Early life and education ==
Hearon was born on January 24, 1995 and grew up in the rural town of Chillicothe, Missouri. He was raised in a Christian household by his young, single mother and was an active member of his church. Hearon also has an older brother and had a distant relationship with his father, who is now deceased. He recognized he was gay from adolescence. He later said he struggled to reconcile his sexuality with the conservative religious environment in which he was raised. Hearon came out as bisexual, via a Facebook post, during college and later came out as gay.

Hearon attended Missouri State University as a sociopolitical communication major with plans to eventually attend law school or another graduate program. In college, he was the philanthropy chair of Phi Gamma Delta. He also joined the improv team, which catalyzed his decision to pursue a career in comedy. After graduating in 2017, he moved to Chicago with other members of the team.

== Career ==
=== Comedy ===
In Chicago, Hearon started performing with his college improv group. He later produced a weekly variety show at the iO Theater. He also cohosted a monthly stand-up showcase called At What Cost? with fellow comedian and collaborator Holmes at the Lincoln Lodge; the duo later toured with At What Cost? across New York and Los Angeles.

In 2019, a Saturday Night Live (SNL) scout saw Hearon perform a character sketch of a "Southern mother warning her daughter's slumber party to not go near her haunted mirror." The show later invited him to audition in New York in front of Lorne Michaels. After SNL turned him down, he started posting his character videos on Twitter. These videos gained wider prominence on the platform for their "ever-relatable premise" and Hearon's "funny but thought-provoking [...] commentary on everything from morality to model trains."

In June 2025, Hearon inked a deal with HBO for his debut comedy special. Taped in Chicago and directed by Sandy Honig, Model Comedian premiered in September 2025.

=== Television ===
Hearon had minor roles in The Megan Stalter Show (2019), Fargo (2020), Life of Harold (2020), Crank Yankers (2021) and Work in Progress (2019–2021). In 2020, he joined the writing staff for Human Resources, a Big Mouth spin-off series that premiered in March 2022.

In June 2021, Hearon was announced as a series regular in the TBS pilot Space. He co-created and co-wrote Best Buds with Caitie Delaney, an animated series in development at Peacock and produced by Bandera Entertainment. In 2023, Hearon and Holmes sold a comedy pilot about two queer friends living in Kansas City, Missouri. The sitcom is currently in production with Jax Media, with Our Lady J as the showrunner.

Hearon had minor roles in Killing It (2023), Mr. & Mrs. Smith (2024) and Overcompensating (2025). He voiced a recurring character in the Netflix adult-animation show Long Story Short (2025).

=== Film ===
Hearon appeared in the 2023 film I Used to Be Funny.

In February 2024, it was announced that Lilly Wachowski will be directing Trash Mountain, an upcoming queer dramedy starring Hearon. The script was co-written by Hearon and Ruby Caster. “Queer representation and stories are vital at this time as we are being shoved further into the margins. Our amazing writers, Caleb and Ruby, are a shining light in all this dang darkness," Wachowski told Collider.

In November 2024, Hearon played Palmer in Sweethearts. The film starring Kiernan Shipka and Nico Hiraga was released on Max. In 2025, he was cast as Miranda's second assistant Charlie in The Devil Wears Prada 2 and Olly in Netflix comedy Little Brother. The same year, he joined the cast of Britanick's Pizza Movie that premiered on Hulu in April 2026.

=== Podcasts ===
Hearon co-hosted the Headgum podcast Keeping Records with comedian Shelby Wolstein until October 2022. Hearon's solo podcast So True with Caleb Hearon debuted in February 2024. So True became a Headgum podcast on October 17, 2024. In December 2025, So True "entered into exclusive distribution, marketing and advertising sales partnership" with Wave, a digital entertainment company. The podcast currently has more than five hundred thousand YouTube subscribers.

=== Other ventures ===
Hearon appeared in the music video for MUNA's "Silk Chiffon" in 2021 and Kevin Morby's "Rock Bottom" in 2022. He was a voice actor in two podcast series—Hit Job (2021) and Past My Bedtime (2022).

== Personal life ==
Hearon is gay. He relocated to Los Angeles from Chicago in 2020, and currently resides in New York City. He also has a home in Kansas City, Missouri.

=== Philanthropy ===
Hearon has hosted the annual benefit show to support the Kansas City Tenant's Union for several years. The $36,000 raised through the 2024 show fuelled the rent strikes at Quality Hill and Independence Towers, for which tenants withheld over $60,000 in rent to move the needle on long-overdue repairs. On the 2026 International Transgender Day of Visibility, Hearon announced that he will be matching up to $15,000 in fan donations to the Trans Justice Funding Project.

=== Politics and activism ===
Hearon is a self-described leftist. In an interview with TheWrap, Hearon said that his "worldview is shaped by the class struggle" as a result of growing up poor in rural Missouri.

In September 2026, Hearon, alongside Susan Sarandon, Hannah Einbinder and ~100 other protestors, was detained by the NYPD for participating in a sit-in at First Avenue, Manhattan. The protest was organized by Jewish Voice for Peace, an anti-Zionist advocacy organization, ahead of Israeli Prime Minister Benjamin Netanyahu's visit to the UN General Assembly.

== Filmography ==
=== Film ===
Year	Title	Role	Notes	Ref.
2022	Jurassic World Dominion	Jeremy Bernier		
2023	I Used to Be Funny	Philip		
2024	Sweethearts	Palmer		
2026	Pizza Movie	Sidney		
2026	The Devil Wears Prada 2	Charlie		
2026	Little Brother	Olly		
TBA	Trash Mountain	Gavin	Post-production; also writer	

=== Television ===
Year	Title	Role	Notes	Ref.
2020	Fargo	Cyrus	Episode: "The Pretend War"	
2021	Crank Yankers	David / Gavin	2 episodes	
2019–2021	Work in Progress	Spencer / Dolly Superfan	2 episodes	
2022–2023	Human Resources	—N/a	Writer	
2023	Killing It	Lil Piggies Customer	Episode: "Timber"	
2024	Mr. and Mrs. Smith	Uber Driver	Episode: "First Date"	
2025	Overcompensating	CJ	Episode: "Boom Clap"	
2025	Model Comedian	Himself	Stand-up special	
2025	Long Story Short	Airspud Guy	Episode: "Yoshi and Baby"	

== Awards and recognition ==
Hearon was one of Variety's "10 Creators to Watch" in 2020. He was nominated for the "Breakthrough Social Star" category at the MTV Movie & TV Awards in 2022. In August 2025, Rolling Stone named him as one of the 25 most influential creators of the year.

In 2026, So True was nominated in the "Outstanding Podcast" category at the GLAAD Media Awards Hearon won the "Comic" category at the 2026 Queerty Awards. He also won the "Best Overall Host" at the 2026 iHeartRadio Podcast Awards.
