= Trash Mountain =

- Directed by: Kris Rey
- Written by: Ruby Caster; Caleb Hearon
- Produced by: Colin Trevorrow
- Starring: Caleb Hearon; Zooey Deschanel; Kyle Marvin; Jaboukie Young-White; Jacki Weaver; Holmes
- Cinematography: Andy Rydzewski
- Edited by: Troy Lewis; Tania Goding
- Production companies: Metronome Film Co.; Five Sticks Productions; Sight Unseen; Streeterville Productions
- Distributed by: Magnolia Pictures
- Release date: September 11, 2026 (TIFF)
- Running time: 90 minutes
- Country: United States
- Language: English

Trash Mountain is a 2026 American comedy film directed by Kris Rey and written by Ruby Caster and Caleb Hearon. Hearon stars alongside Zooey Deschanel, Kyle Marvin, Jaboukie Young-White, Jacki Weaver, and Holmes.

The film will have its world premiere at the Centrepiece section of the 2026 Toronto International Film Festival on September 11, 2026.

== Premise ==
A gay Chicago man in his 20s must return to rural Missouri to deal with the death of his father, an obsessive hoarder who has left a house full of items.

== Cast ==
- Caleb Hearon as Gavin
- Zooey Deschanel as Abbi
- Kyle Marvin
- Jaboukie Young-White
- Jacki Weaver
- Holmes

== Production ==
The film's script was written by Ruby Caster and Caleb Hearon. Hearon sent the script to his friend Lilly Wachowski, who found it "beautiful and sad and funny", also noting the importance of queer representation. She was set to direct the film, which would make it her solo directorial debut.

Principal photography began in October 2025 in Chicago, with Kris Rey named as the film director and Wachowski being one of its executive producers. Zooey Deschanel, Kyle Marvin, Jaboukie Young-White, Jacki Weaver, and Holmes have joined the cast.

== Release ==
Trash Mountain premiered at the Centrepiece Section of the 2026 Toronto International Film Festival on September 11, 2026. Magnolia Pictures acquired the film, and it is set to be released in 2027.
