= Owen Thiele =

American actor (born 1996)

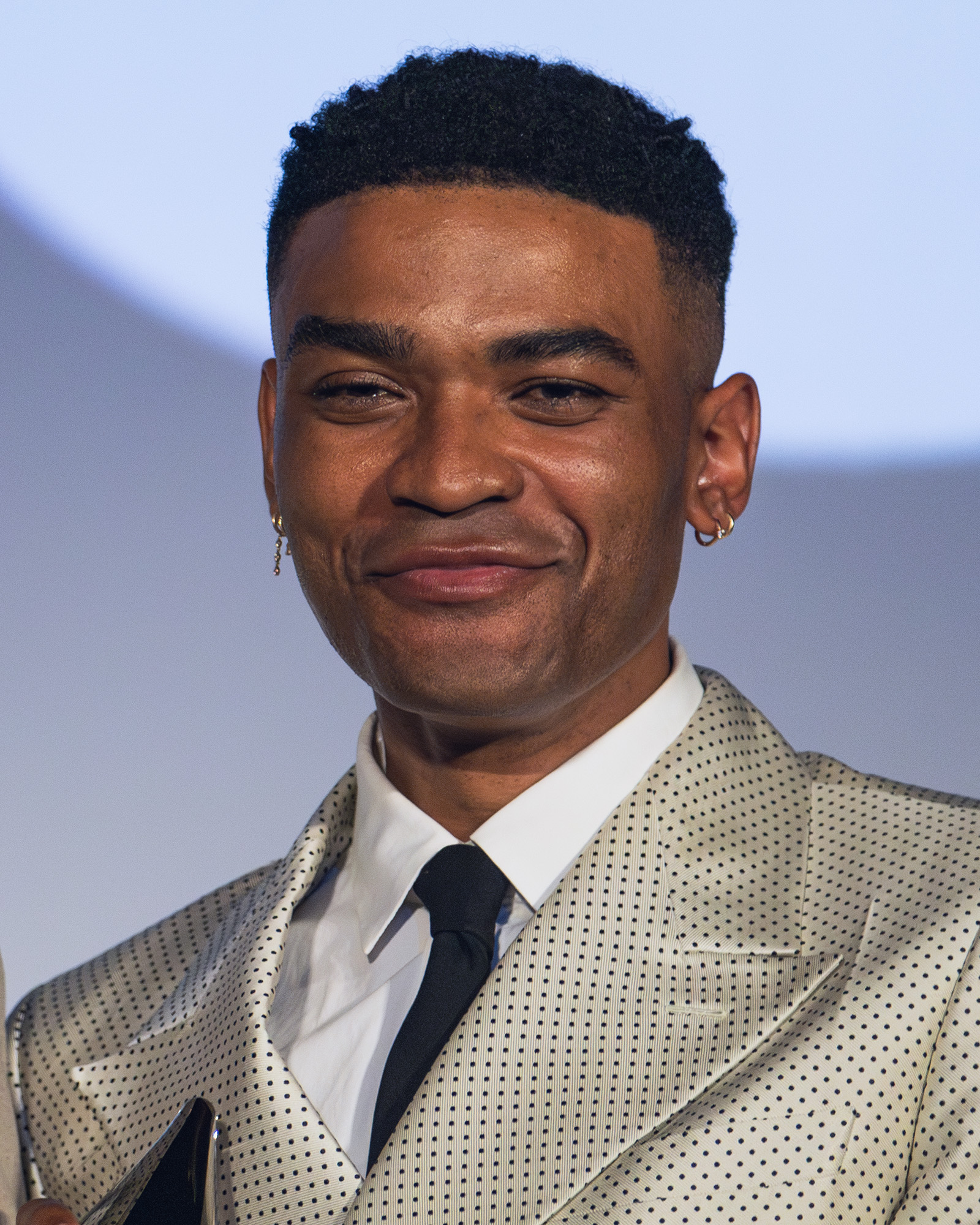
- Thiele in 2026
- Born: November 4, 1996 (age 30); Houston, Texas, U.S.
- Occupations: Actor; podcaster; singer
- Years active: 2017–present
- Father: Bob Thiele Jr.
- Relatives: Jay Kanter (grandfather); Bob Thiele (grandfather); Jane Harvey (grandmother); Charlie B. Foster (cousin); Sophie Burnham (cousin)

Owen Thiele (born November 4, 1996) is an American actor and podcaster. He is best known for Adults (2025-present) and Overcompensating (2025-present).

== Early life and education ==
Thiele was born in Houston, Texas, and grew up in Beverly Hills, California. He was adopted by music producer Bob Thiele Jr. and his wife, Amy Kanter, who were unable to have children due to Kanter's cervical cancer. He was raised Jewish.

Thiele attended the Center for Early Education and Crossroads School. He studied theater at the Adderley School of Performing Arts in Pacific Palisades, Los Angeles. He spent a month at the NYU Tisch School of the Arts before dropping out.

== Career ==
=== Acting ===
Thiele worked on the web series Eighty-Sixed (2017) with Cazzie David and made an appearance on Hailey Bieber's YouTube interview series Who's in My Bathroom?. He also appeared in the Taylor Swift music video for her single "The Man" and recorded videos with Emma Chamberlain. He also appeared in Taylor Swift's music video for "You Need to Calm Down".

His acting roles include I Think You Should Leave with Tim Robinson and Hacks. He was in the second season of the comedy series Dollface. He had a breakout role in the 2023 mockumentary comedy film Theater Camp as costume director Gigi Charbonier. That year, he appeared as Archer March in romantic comedy film Zoey 102, a spin-off from Nickelodeon comedy drama series Zoey 101. He appeared in 2023 film Parachute, directed by Brittany Snow in her directorial debut.

In 2024, he was cast in Amazon Prime Video series Overcompensating. He appeared in A Nonsense Christmas with Sabrina Carpenter in 2024. That year, he began developing Off Color, a semi-autobiographical comedy for Amazon Prime Video, with Brian Gallivan, Ilana Glazer, and Kent Alterman among its executive producers. He was also cast in FX sitcom Adults, created by The Tonight Show writers Ben Kronengold and Rebecca Shaw. The second season of Adults premiered in August 2026.

He appeared in the 2025 film Idiotka, set in the fashion industry, with Camila Mendes.

=== Podcast ===
In 2024, Thiele started his own podcast, In Your Dreams, on Alex Cooper's Unwell network. Guests have included Molly Gordon, Rachel Sennott, and Emma Chamberlain.

=== Music ===
His debut single "Some Like It Hot" was written by Wynne Bennet and Fiona Bevan and released in 2018. He also sings on the soundtrack of the film Theater Camp.

== Personal life ==
Thiele is openly gay. He has been in a relationship with celebrity stylist Jared Ellner for 10 years as of 2026.

== Filmography ==
Year	Title	Role	Notes
2017	Eighty-Sixed	Owen	8 episodes
2020	Find a Way or Make One	Roxie	Episode: "Today I Saw a Bird and Watched You Fly Away with it"
2021	I Think You Should Leave with Tim Robinson	Matt Alex	Episode: "Didn't you say there was gonna be five people at this table?"
2022	Dollface	Q	Recurring role, 7 episodes
2022	Hacks	David	Episode: "The Captain's Wife"
2023	Theater Camp	Gigi Chabonier	
2023	Parachute	Devon	
2023	Zoey 102	Archer March	
2024	A Nonsense Christmas with Sabrina Carpenter	Himself	
2025	Idiotka	Oliver Knowles	
2025–present	Overcompensating	George	Recurring role, 7 episodes
2025–present	Adults	Anton	Main role
2025	Too Much	Himself	Episode: "Enough, Actually"
TBA	Peaked †	TBA	Filming
