= Idiotka =

2025 American comedy film by Nastasya Popov

- Theatrical release poster
- Directed by: Nastasya Popov
- Written by: Nastasya Popov
- Produced by: Tess Cohen; Nastasya Popov; Camila Mendes; Rachel Matthews; Saba Zerehi
- Starring: Anna Baryshnikov; Camila Mendes; Mark Ivanir; Benito Skinner; Owen Thiele; Galina Jovovich; Nerses Stamos; Ilia Volok; Jake Choi; Saweetie; Julia Fox
- Cinematography: Kristen Correll
- Edited by: Taylor Joy Mason; Rob Paglia
- Music by: Ian Hultquist
- Production companies: Virgo Films; Honor Role; Spark Features; H.wood Media; Gulfstream Pictures
- Distributed by: Utopia
- Release dates: March 12, 2025 (SXSW); February 27, 2026 (United States)
- Running time: 82 minutes
- Country: United States
- Languages: English; Russian

Idiotka (Russian: Идиотка, lit. 'Female Idiot') is a 2025 American comedy film written and directed by Nastasya Popov in her directorial debut. It stars Anna Baryshnikov, Camila Mendes, Mark Ivanir, Benito Skinner, Owen Thiele, Galina Jovovich, Nerses Stamos, Ilia Volok, Jake Choi, Saweetie and Julia Fox.

Idiotka premiered at the South by Southwest on March 12, 2025, and was released on February 27, 2026, by Utopia.

== Cast ==
- Anna Baryshnikov as Margarita Levlansky
- Camila Mendes as Nicol Garcia
- Owen Thiele as Oliver Knowles
- Benito Skinner as Jonathan Smith
- Mark Ivanir as Samuel Levlansky
- Saweetie as Candy
- Julia Fox as Emma Wexler
- Galina Jovovich as Gita Levlansky
- Nerses Stamos as Nerses Levlansky
- Gabbriette as Veronique
- Zack Bia as Music Producer
- Shaun Brown as Malcolm
- Jake Choi as Jung-soo
- Marcelo Tubert as Oleg
- Ilia Volok as Vlad
- Gigi Zumbado as Amalie

== Production ==
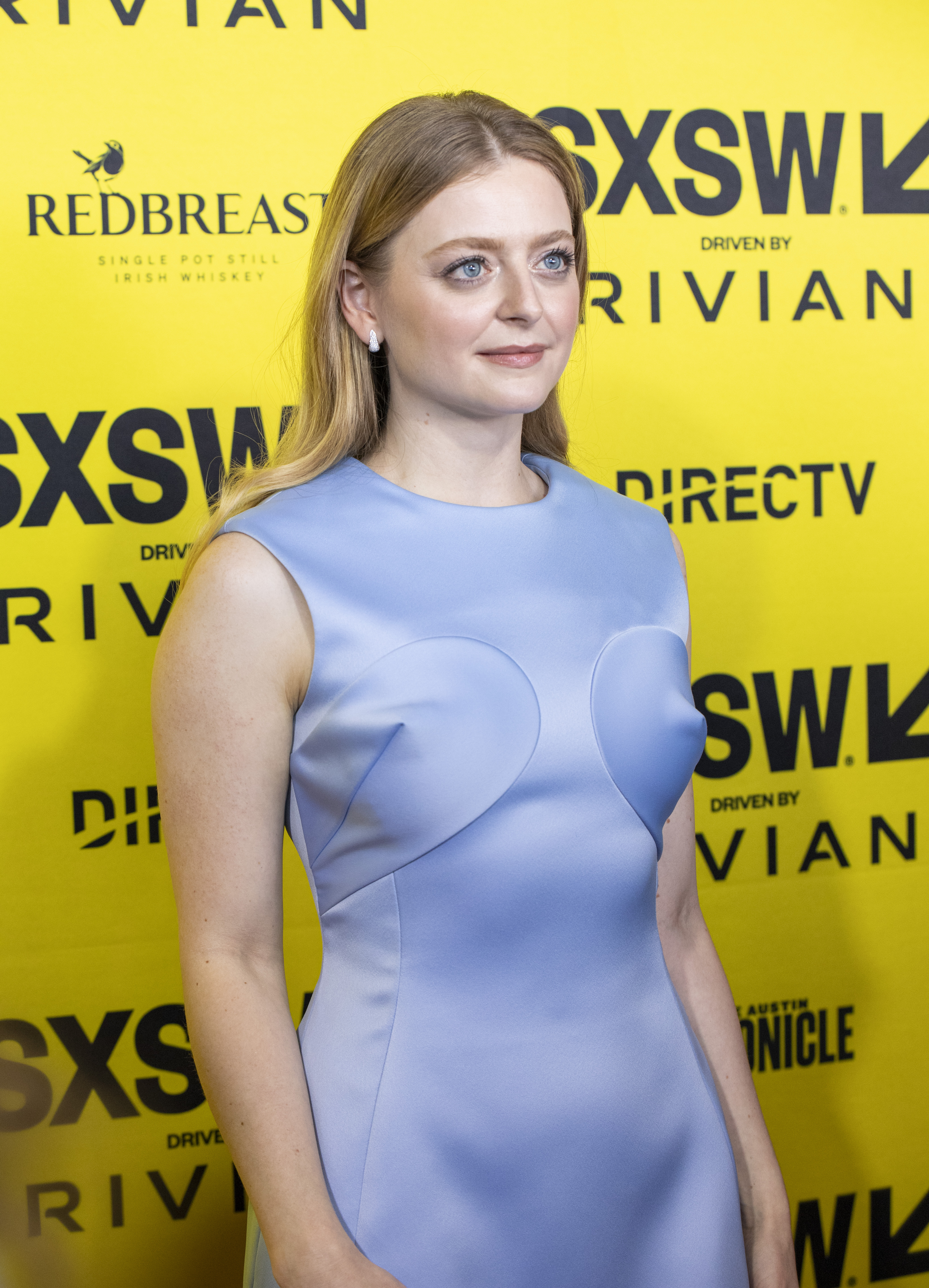
Anna Baryshnikov at the 2025 South by Southwest festival.

The film is the feature-length debut of writer/director Nastasya Popov. The cast is led by Camila Mendes and Anna Baryshnikov and also includes Owen Thiele, Benito Skinner, Mark Ivanir, musician Saweetie, and Julia Fox. The ensemble cast also includes Galina Jovovich and Nerses Stamos, with cameo appearances from Gabbriette and Zack Bia. Popov and Tess Cohen produced for Virgo Films alongside Mendes and Rachel Matthews for Honor Role. Saba Zerehi is also a producer.

In 2023, the film received a SAG-AFTRA interim agreement to film during the 2023 SAG-AFTRA strike.

== Release ==
The film premiered at South by Southwest on 12 March 2025. In June 2025, Utopia acquired North American rights to the film. It was released on February 27, 2026.

== Reception ==
On the review aggregator website Rotten Tomatoes, 68% of 19 critics' reviews are positive.
