= The Fairfax Millions =

- Directed by: Nikolai Ilinsky
- Written by: Nikolai Ilinsky
- Starring: Juozas Budraitis; Gražina Baikštytė; Ilmar Tammour
- Cinematography: Valery Kvas
- Music by: Eduard Artemyev
- Production company: Dovzhenko Film Studios
- Release date: 1980
- Running time: 81 minutes
- Country: Soviet Union
- Language: Russian

The Fairfax Millions (Russian: Миллионы Ферфакса, romanized: Milliony Ferfaksa) is a 1980 Soviet detective film directed by Nikolai Ilinsky based on Alan Winnington's novel of the same name.

== Plot ==
An influential businessman, millionaire Anthony Fairfax, suffers from a serious illness. With the help of Dr. Jones, a heart transplant operation is performed on him using the heart taken from his brother. Paul Fairfax is a young scapegrace, who eagerly waits the death of Anthony, and is the only legitimate heir to his vast fortune. His heart is genetically the most suitable for transplantation, and on the advice of the doctors Anthony Fairfax agrees to a double murder - Paul and a certain Mr. Jackson, who is supposed to play the role of a donor.

Russell Jones, Dr. of Fairfax is the lover of his young wife and receives an annual solid grant for research. Fearing that with the death of Anthony the payments will stop, he dreams of getting several hundred thousand pounds and going abroad. For greater confidence in success, he goes on deception and tells Fairfax about the practical completion of his work on creating an artificial heart.

On the trail of criminals, with the help of Jones' former lover, the experienced inspector Percy Gallet, appointed by the ministry, comes around. He organizes a surveillance of the house, waits until Jones arrives, and is about to arrest both of them. Fairfax kills Jones, and his people murder Gallet. Evening news reports the culpability in all the murders of Dr. Russell Jones, allegedly suffering from manic psychosis.

== Cast ==
- Juozas Budraitis — Anthony Fairfax, a millionaire
- Grazhyna Baikshtite — Marilyn Fairfax, wife of Anthony
- Ilmar Tammour — Inspector Percy Gallet
- Alexander Martynov — Russell Jones, transplant surgeon
- Helga Dantzberg — Lucy Downtree
- Povilas Gaidis — Tiggy Downtree
- Gediminas Girdvainis — Sergeant Fitzgerald, Assistant Inspector Galleta
- Juris Strenga — George Burns
- Galina Loginova — Molly Firren, secretary of Dr. Jones
- Ivars Kalniņš — Paul Fairfax, brother of Antoni
- Vladimir Ehrenberg — Joshua Ward
- Milena Tontegode — Gully
- Yevgeny Vesnik — High Commissioner of Police
- Vladimir Tkachenko is Adjutant General Commex
- Dmitry Mirgorodsky — police detective
- Yuri Leonidov — General Cummins
- Volodymyr Talashko — Malcolm Treddic
- Vladimir Shakalo — Arthur Cook
- Paul Butkevich — Police Commissioner
- Lydia Chaschina — Elsa Jackson
