= Welcome to Flatch =

2022 American television mockumentary series

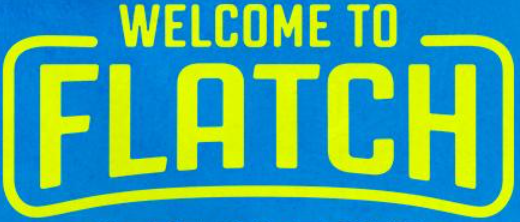
- Genre: Sitcom; Mockumentary
- Based on: This Country by: Daisy May Cooper; Charlie Cooper
- Developed by: Jenny Bicks
- Starring: Holmes; Sam Straley; Justin Linville; Taylor Ortega; Krystal Smith; Aya Cash; Seann William Scott; Jaime Pressly
- Country of origin: United States
- Original language: English
- No. of seasons: 2
- No. of episodes: 27

Production
- Executive producers: Jenny Bicks; Paul Feig; Angie Stephenson; Daisy May Cooper; Charlie Cooper
- Camera setup: Single-camera
- Production companies: Perkins Street Productions; Feigco Entertainment; BBC Studios LA Productions; Lionsgate Television; Fox Entertainment

Original release
- Network: Fox
- Release: March 17, 2022 – February 2, 2023

Welcome to Flatch is an American mockumentary sitcom that aired on Fox from March 17, 2022, to February 2, 2023. It is based on the British series This Country, which was created and written by Daisy May Cooper and her brother Charlie Cooper who also played the lead roles. The American adaptation was developed by Jenny Bicks. In May 2022, the series was renewed for a second season which premiered on September 29, 2022. In October 2023, the series was canceled after two seasons.

== Premise ==
A documentary crew sent to explore life in a small town meets the eccentric residents of Flatch, Ohio (a fictional rural community implied to be located just outside of Columbus in Franklin County).

== Cast and characters ==
=== Main ===
- Holmes as Kelly Mallet
- Sam Straley as Lloyd "Shrub" Mallet
- Justin Linville as Mickey St. Jean
- Taylor Ortega as Nadine Garcia-Parney
- Krystal Smith as Mandy "Big Mandy" Matthews
- Aya Cash as Cheryl Peterson
- Seann William Scott as Joseph "Father Joe" Binghoffer
- Jaime Pressly as Barb Flatch (season 2)

=== Recurring ===
- William Tokarsky as Len
- Desmin Borges as Jimmy Jameson
- Jason MacDonald as Bobby Mallet
- Erin Bowles as Beth
- Karen Huie as June Jiang
- Sheila M. O'Rear as Leotha St. Jean
- Troy Hammond as Blind Billy
- Kyle Selig as Dylan Parney
- Derek Richardson as Lloyd Mallet (Sr.)

== Episodes ==
=== Series overview ===
Season	Episodes	Originally released	
Season	Episodes	First released	Last released
1	14	March 17, 2022	May 26, 2022
2	13	September 29, 2022	February 2, 2023

=== Season 1 (2022) ===
No. overall	No. in season	Title	Directed by	Written by	Original release date	Prod. code	U.S. viewers (millions)
1	1	"Pilot"	Paul Feig	Teleplay by : Jenny Bicks	March 17, 2022	WFL-101	1.04
A documentary crew sets out to explore life in a small town, and chooses Flatch, Ohio. They catch the town gearing up for the annual Scarecrow Festival, where cousins Kelly and Shrub Mallet are determined to win a coveted prize.
2	2	"Jesus Take The Wheel"	Paul Feig	Jenny Bicks	March 24, 2022 (Note: This episode was released early on Fox.com and Hulu on March 17, 2022.)	WFL-102	0.92
Short on cash, Kelly starts a ride share business called "Kuber". When the town sign goes missing, local newspaper reporter Cheryl Peterson investigates. Shrub tries to woo neighbor Beth.
3	3	"Dance It Out"	Paul Feig	Paul Feig	March 31, 2022	WFL-103	0.84
Determined to buy a new line of sneakers, Kelly starts a hip-hop dance school to earn money. Shrub wants the sneakers just as badly, and begins selling homemade treasure maps which gullible citizens line up to buy.
4	4	"Naked Lady Day"	Clark Mathis	Robert Padnick	April 7, 2022	WFL-104	0.85
When Shrub is caught creating graffiti, Father Joe tries to channel his passion in a more positive direction by getting Shrub into an art class. Shrub is then floored when he discovers drawing a nude model is part of the class. With a reporter from neighboring town Pockton showing a romantic interest in Cheryl, she tries to define what relationship she may still have with Father Joe.
5	5	"That Old Flatch Magic"	Clark Mathis	Paul Feig	April 14, 2022	WFL-105	0.72
Kelly encourages Dylan to embrace his old passion for magic, which Nadine has forbidden him to ever do again. Shrub manages to score a date with Beth, but Beth's other suitor Mickey seems determined to ruin it.
6	6	"RIP Cynthia"	Clark Mathis	Jenny Bicks	April 21, 2022	WFL-106	0.77
After Kelly and Shrub help elderly residents learn computer skills, Len appears to get scammed by an Eastern European woman on a dating site. Big Mandy offers to teach Cheryl self-defense after the latter is attacked for dating the reporter from a rival town.
7	7	"Sweet Spot"	Natalia Anderson	Kayreth Williams	April 28, 2022	WFL-107	0.69
After receiving cash for a kind act, Kelly and Shrub seek out other good deeds to do in town, hoping for further rewards. Shrub and Beth have been spending more time together, with Shrub wondering when they will kiss. Father Joe hires Blind Billy to be his assistant, only to have Billy take advantage of his kindness. Cheryl finds herself in a deeper, but confusing relationship with Jimmy.
8	8	"Dinner, Dresses, and Dumps"	Natalia Anderson	Donick Cary	May 5, 2022	WFL-108	0.84
Kelly looks forward to dinner with her absentee father, only to have him disappoint her again. Now fully in a relationship with Beth, Shrub starts to become annoyed by her constant texting and excessive clinginess. Cheryl wears THE dress to a date with Jimmy, hoping to get him to call her his girlfriend, but it does not happen. She gets stuck in the dress and needs Father Joe to help her out of it, which renews a few old sparks between the two.
9	9	"The Devil's Backbone"	Fernando Frias	Joshua Corey & Brian Kratz	May 12, 2022	WFL-109	0.74
Determined to make the elusive viral video, Kelly plots to reunite Father Joe with his old Christian boy band A-Men. Shrub learns that to do so, Kelly had to make up a story that he's a terminally ill super-fan. Joe feels guilty about turning on bandmate Julius back in the day and ruining his dreams, but when Julius arrives, he appears to be thriving. Shrub's brush with fake death has him determined to finally ride his bike down the famed "devil's backbone".
10	10	"On The Hooky"	Fernando Frias	Emily Schmidt	May 12, 2022	WFL-110	0.56
Shrub starts a job detailing cars at the dealership where Dylan works. This leaves a lonely Kelly to hang out with a reluctant Father Joe, who nicks her with a golf ball causing Kelly to fake the severity of the injury. Cheryl and Big Mandy meet at a bar for drinks when another woman hits on Mandy. Cheryl then clumsily attempts to be Mandy's wing-woman.
11	11	"No Credit/Bad Credit"	Catalina Aguilar-Mastretta	Julie Mandel-Folly	May 19, 2022	WFL-111	0.79
At Shrub's workplace, he and Kelly find out the dealership will be shooting one of its "epic" over-the-top commercials. Kelly gets a part as an extra, but soon upstages Nadine to get the lead role. Kelly's excitement is tempered when she hears the owner say she better fits the typical "no credit/bad credit" customer than the more polished Nadine. Father Joe fills in for an absent member in Mickey's Civil War reenactment group, only to learn his character does not say or do anything. Cheryl and Jimmy attend a journalism awards ceremony, where Jimmy reveals his sore loser side after Cheryl beats him out for a trophy.
12	12	"Ghosted"	Catalina Aguilar-Mastretta	Bill Posley	May 19, 2022	WFL-112	0.62
When the lights start flickering in Cheryl's office, Nadine is certain it's the ghost of Franny, the last woman to run the local newspaper. This leads to Cheryl, Nadine, Mandy and Father Joe holding a seance to try to communicate with Franny's spirit. Meanwhile, Kelly's annual trip to a department store for her birthday gets sidetracked when Shrub suggests they take a shortcut through the woods. The two eventually lose sight of the documentary crew and have to record their adventures on their phones.
13	13	"Pyramid Scheme"	Molly McGlynn	Donick Cary	May 26, 2022	WFL-113	0.70
When Kelly's cool aunt Lola rolls into town in her pink company car, an excited Kelly cannot help but get roped into Lola's pyramid scheme selling "EnergizeHer" juice. Kelly targets Father Joe, who becomes hooked on the juice despite it being a product for women. Cheryl has to stage an intervention, which draws her and Joe close again. Elsewhere, Shrub's artistic skills have him thriving at his detailing job, and he is shocked to receive an acceptance letter from an art school in Cleveland.
14	14	"Merry Flatchmas"	Molly McGlynn	Jenny Bicks	May 26, 2022	WFL-114	0.60
Shrub worries about telling Kelly he's going to college, knowing she'll be devastated. At the town's annual Christmas event, Kelly gets promoted from elf to Santa when her father fails to show, but the power of being Santa goes to Kelly's head. Cheryl and Father Joe have a gift exchange which renews their status as a couple. Nadine reveals she's pregnant again. Beth shows up holding Mickey's hand, causing Shrub to blurt out that he's going to college, which Kelly hears.

=== Season 2 (2022–23) ===
No. overall	No. in season	Title	Directed by	Written by	Original release date	Prod. code	U.S. viewers (millions)
15	1	"Welcome to (Barb) Flatch"	Paul Feig	Jenny Bicks	September 29, 2022	WFL-201	0.82
When Shrub's grandmother, the oldest resident in town, dies, Flatch mobilizes for a "passing the cane" event in which a special cane is handed down to the next oldest person. That happens to be "Old Lady Flatch", which brings the woman's daughter, Barb Flatch (Jaime Pressly), back to town. Elsewhere, Cheryl has moved in with Father Joe and has begun raising chickens, while Shrub makes a commitment to win back Beth.
16	2	"Blackout"	Paul Feig	Katie Greenway	October 6, 2022	WFL-202	0.85
A blackout in Flatch causes most of the town to gather in the church, which has a generator. Unable to keep their gender-reveal ice cream cake frozen, Nadine and Dylan decide to hold their reveal party on the spot. Father Joe and Cheryl get drunk on Joe's home-brewed beer, which he decided has to be consumed before it gets warm. Shrub agonizes over his dead pet lizard, which he had frozen in hopes that a cure for its disease would some day be found. Meanwhile, Barb Flatch reboots the real estate business that she used to run with her ex-husband.
17	3	"Maniflatch Destiny"	Dime Davis	Donick Cary	October 13, 2022	WFL-203	0.89
Barb takes on Kelly as an unpaid intern, introducing the latter to "manifesting" and posting future wants and needs on a vision board. Kelly wants to "manifest" a pontoon boat, and soon realizes she cannot acquire one unless Barb pays her. Meanwhile, Father Joe gives driving lessons to Shrub, using Cheryl's newly-purchased pickup truck. At the same time, Shrub is staying on Mickey's couch, having decided he cannot live with Kelly anymore. Elsewhere, Mandy leads Bible study at the church, offering her unique take on Adam and Eve.
18	4	"Open House"	Dime Davis	Joshua Corey & Brian Fratz	October 20, 2022	WFL-204	0.83
Barb hosts her first open house as an independent realtor, with Kelly now acting as her assistant. Kelly is relegated to cleaning the backyard, and begins selling items from a shed. Shrub finds himself in a thruple with Beth and Mickey. During his turn with Beth, Shrub takes her to the open house for a date, knowing there are free snacks and beverages there. Cheryl becomes overprotective of a chicken when she sees roosters "harassing" it. Father Joe is concerned when Mandy counsels a couple that he was supposed to be seeing, especially when Mandy's methods seem to work. With money she made from selling the shed to Cheryl, Kelly buys a pontoon boat.
19	5	"The Headless Horseman"	Kimmy Gatewood	Lena Kouyoumdjian	October 27, 2022	WFL-205	0.93
Beth proposes a thruple costume for Halloween with her as a cowgirl and Mickey and Shrub playing the horse. Shrub is angry that he was chosen to be the rear of the horse, and after complaining to Barb and getting her advice, he tells Beth and Mickey he wants out of the thruple. Meanwhile, Barb, Kelly and Cheryl all go to a fortune teller. The man says Kelly will experience something horrifying while Barb will fall for someone surprising. He puts a curse on Cheryl after she mocks his profession, and soon Cheryl has a number of bad things happen. The fortune teller's other predictions come true when Barb has sex with Shrub and a horrified Kelly witnesses it.
20	6	"Glowing Up is Hard to Do"	Kimmy Gatewood	Kayreth Williams	November 10, 2022	WFL-206	0.85
As Shrub regularly hooks up with Barb, he gains a new look, new wardrobe, and a new, annoying demeanor. Kelly is mad at Shrub for breaking the "cuz code" and for taking up too much of Barb's attention. Kelly aims to split up the new couple by having Beth act more like Barb in Shrub's presence. Meanwhile, Shrub and Barb's frequent PDA has Joe and Cheryl reexamining their own sex life.
21	7	"The Tri-state Real Estate Conference"	Steven K. Tsuchida	Mitra Jouhari	November 17, 2022	WFL-207	0.92
Barb ruins Kelly's experience at the Tri-state Real Estate Conference by dragging Shrub along. Shrub becomes jealous upon learning that Barb's ex-husband Bert (Adam Ray) is also there. The triangle stress leads to Barb drinking heavily, forcing Kelly to prepare to do Barb's presentation herself. Barb later tells Shrub they should end their relationship. Back home in Flatch, Cheryl decides to freeze her eggs, and enlists Joe's help to give her regular hormone injections.
22	8	"Flatchural Disaster"	Steven K. Tsuchida	Bill Posley	November 27, 2022	WFL-208	2.45
Barb, Dylan and Mandy all vie for an open town selectperson seat. Kelly campaigns for Barb and Nadine supports hubby Dylan, while Shrub backs Mandy as revenge against Barb. A tornado warning forces the candidate debate to take place in the church basement. Kelly and Nadine both run to the same store in Pockton to secure a certain pin that Flatch residents expect selectperson candidates to wear, but before they can return, Nadine goes into labor.
23	9	"O Come, All Ye Flatchful"	Kim Nguyen	Jessie Gaskell	December 8, 2022	WFL-209	0.83
Kelly cons Columbus Crew soccer star Derrick Etienne into visiting Flatch for a charity toy event, then has to coach several kids to pretend to be orphans when the latter surprisingly accepts. Barb holds auditions for her "Barbieshop quartet", and refuses to give a spot to Joe despite his professional boy group background. Joe's over-the-top efforts to change Barb's mind has Cheryl reevaluating their relationship. Shrub tries to locate his birth father.
24	10	"Flatch or (Butter) Bust"	Kim Nguyen	Katie Greenway	January 5, 2023	WFL-210	0.92
To try to lure a butter bust museum to Flatch, Barb makes a video about the town's history with help from Nadine and Kelly. However, the experience only makes Barb feel like she has not had nearly the impact on her hometown that her ancestors did. Elsewhere, Shrub rides with Joe to Kentucky so that the former can try out for a local play, as he suspects the play's director (Derek Richardson) is his birth father. Meanwhile, as Cheryl is cleaning some of Joe's old stuff out of her house, Mandy invites a female acquaintance to buy some of the junk when in reality she just wants to ask the woman out.
25	11	"Flatch-elor Party"	Shana Hagan	Donick Cary	January 12, 2023	WFL-211	0.92
Barb calls a meeting to rally the citizens to try to catch a porch pirate that has victimized the town. Kelly sets up a bachelor party for her dad, but it ends up being a laser tag event with only a handful of people. Surprisingly, her dad enjoys the evening and pays Kelly a rare compliment. Shrub labors over revealing himself to his now-likely birth father.
26	12	"What Are You, Chicken?"	Robert Cohen	Bill Posley	January 26, 2023	WFL-212	0.92
Cheryl enters one of her chickens in the annual fair, only to be taken aback when she sees that Joe is one of the judges. Kelly learns that her father is the town porch pirate, and she enlists Shrub to help her secretly return the items. However, the two are caught and accused of theft. When Kelly sees her father has no intentions of changing, she finally cuts ties with him. Meanwhile, Mandy tries to impress her latest flame by challenging her to an axe-throwing contest at the fair.
27	13	"Flatch: Churn Here"	Robert Cohen	Joshua Corey & Brian Kratz	February 2, 2023	WFL-213	0.76
Barb and Kelly pull out all the stops to convince the Butter Bust Museum committee that Flatch should be the museum's home. Shrub decides to finally reveal his identity to his birth father.

=== Crossover ===
Holmes and Sam Straley guest starred as Kelly and Shrub Mallet on Call Me Kat in the episode "Call Me Flatch", which premiered on April 28, 2022.

== Production ==
=== Development ===
On December 4, 2019, an American version of This Country was announced by Fox with Jenny Bicks and Paul Feig attached to write and direct the pilot. On January 30, 2020, This Country was given a pilot order and on October 30, 2020, it was given a series order. The series is a co-production between Lionsgate Television, Fox Entertainment, Feigco Entertainment and BBC Studios with Jenny Bicks as writer and executive producer and Paul Feig as director and executive producer. On May 17, 2021, it was announced that the series title had been changed to Welcome to Flatch. On May 16, 2022, it was announced that the series had been renewed for a second season. On October 6, 2023, Fox canceled the series after two seasons.

=== Casting ===
On February 24, 2020, Seann William Scott was cast in a main role for the pilot. On March 4, 2020, Holmes, Sam Straley, Taylor Ortega and Krystal Smith were cast in main roles for the pilot. On July 10, 2020, Aya Cash and Justin Linville were cast in main roles for the pilot. On December 4, 2020, Desmin Borges was cast in a recurring role. On December 30, 2020, Jason MacDonald was cast in a recurring role. On August 4, 2022, Jaime Pressly joined the cast as a series regular for the second season.

=== Filming ===
Production of the pilot began in March 2020, but production was shut down after a single day of filming due to the early days of the COVID-19 pandemic. Using the footage that had been filmed, a ten-minute presentation was created and was used to sell the series to Fox and secure a series order. In December 2020, it was reported that filming had commenced on the episode order. Filming took place in North Carolina.

== Release ==
The series premiered on March 17, 2022. The second season premiered on September 29, 2022.

== Reception ==
=== Critical response ===
The review aggregator website Rotten Tomatoes reported a 60% approval rating with an average rating of 6.5/10, based on 10 critic reviews. The website's critics consensus reads, "This Americanized reimagining of a British sitcom doesn't make the funniest of first impressions, but its small town scruff is endearing enough to merit sticking around and giving it a chance." Metacritic, which uses a weighted average, assigned a score of 58 out of 100 based on 9 critics, indicating "mixed or average reviews".

=== Ratings ===
==== Overall ====
Viewership and ratings per season of Welcome to Flatch
Season	Timeslot (ET)	Episodes	First aired		Last aired		TV season
Season	Timeslot (ET)	Episodes	Date	Viewers (millions)	Date	Viewers (millions)	TV season
1	Thursday 9:30 p.m. (1–8, 10, 12, 14); Thursday 9:00 p.m. (9, 11, 13)	14	March 17, 2022	1.04	May 26, 2022	0.60	2021–22
2	Thursday 9:00 p.m. (1–7, 9–13); Sunday 8:00 p.m. (8)	13	September 29, 2022	0.82	February 2, 2023	0.76	2022–23

==== Season 1 ====
Viewership and ratings per episode of Welcome to Flatch
No.	Title	Air date	Rating (18–49)	Viewers (millions)	DVR (18–49)	DVR viewers (millions)	Total (18–49)	Total viewers (millions)
1	"Pilot"	March 17, 2022	0.2	1.04	0.1	0.42	0.3	1.46
2	"Jesus Take The Wheel"	March 24, 2022	0.2	0.92	0.0	0.21	0.2	1.14
3	"Dance It Out"	March 31, 2022	0.2	0.84	0.0	0.17	0.2	1.01
4	"Naked Lady Day"	April 7, 2022	0.2	0.85	0.0	0.21	0.2	1.05
5	"That Old Flatch Magic"	April 14, 2022	0.2	0.72	0.1	0.25	0.2	0.96
6	"RIP Cynthia"	April 21, 2022	0.2	0.77	0.1	0.22	0.2	1.00
7	"Sweet Spot"	April 28, 2022	0.2	0.69	—N/a	—N/a	—N/a	—N/a
8	"Dinner, Dresses, and Dumps"	May 5, 2022	0.2	0.84	—N/a	—N/a	—N/a	—N/a
9	"The Devil's Backbone"	May 12, 2022	0.2	0.74	—N/a	—N/a	—N/a	—N/a
10	"On The Hooky"	May 12, 2022	0.1	0.56	—N/a	—N/a	—N/a	—N/a
11	"No Credit/Bad Credit"	May 19, 2022	0.2	0.79	—N/a	—N/a	—N/a	—N/a
12	"Ghosted"	May 19, 2022	0.1	0.62	—N/a	—N/a	—N/a	—N/a
13	"Pyramid Scheme"	May 26, 2022	0.2	0.70	—N/a	—N/a	—N/a	—N/a
14	"Merry Flatchmas"	May 26, 2022	0.2	0.60	—N/a	—N/a	—N/a	—N/a

==== Season 2 ====
Viewership and ratings per episode of Welcome to Flatch
No.	Title	Air date	Rating (18–49)	Viewers (millions)	DVR (18–49)	DVR viewers (millions)	Total (18–49)	Total viewers (millions)
1	"Welcome to (Barb) Flatch"	September 29, 2022	0.2	0.82	0.1	0.27	0.3	1.09
2	"Blackout"	October 6, 2022	0.2	0.85	0.1	0.23	0.2	1.07
3	"Maniflatch Destiny"	October 13, 2022	0.2	0.89	0.1	0.22	0.3	1.12
4	"Open House"	October 20, 2022	0.2	0.83	0.1	0.24	0.3	1.07
5	"The Headless Horseman"	October 27, 2022	0.2	0.93	0.1	0.20	0.3	1.12
6	"Glowing Up is Hard to Do"	November 10, 2022	0.2	0.85	0.1	0.22	0.2	1.07
7	"The Tri-state Real Estate Conference"	November 17, 2022	0.2	0.92	0.0	0.26	0.2	1.18
8	"Flatchural Disaster"	November 27, 2022	0.7	2.45	0.1	0.19	0.7	2.64 (Note: Live+7 ratings were unavailable, so Live+3 ratings have been used instead.)
9	"O Come, All Ye Flatchful"	December 8, 2022	0.2	0.83	0.0	0.21	0.2	1.04
10	"Flatch or (Butter) Bust"	January 5, 2023	0.2	0.92	0.1	0.30	0.3	1.22
11	"Flatch-elor Party"	January 12, 2023	0.2	0.92	0.1	0.29	0.3	1.21
12	"What Are You, Chicken?"	January 26, 2023	0.2	0.92	—N/a	—N/a	—N/a	—N/a
13	"Flatch: Churn Here"	February 2, 2023	0.2	0.76	—N/a	—N/a	—N/a	—N/a
