= First Time Female Director =

2023 film by Chelsea Peretti

- Directed by: Chelsea Peretti
- Written by: Chelsea Peretti
- Produced by: Chelsea Peretti; Amy Poehler; Kate Arend; Jordan Grief; Deanna Barillari
- Starring: Chelsea Peretti; Blake Anderson; Kate Berlant; Megan Mullally; Benito Skinner; Megan Stalter; Jak Knight; Max Greenfield; Amy Poehler
- Cinematography: Jonathan Furmanski
- Edited by: Jay Deuby; Jim Carretta
- Music by: Kool Kojak
- Production companies: Paper Kite Productions; MarVista Entertainment; Fox Entertainment
- Distributed by: The Roku Channel
- Release dates: June 12, 2023 (Tribeca); March 8, 2024
- Running time: 97 minutes
- Country: United States
- Language: English

First Time Female Director is a 2023 American comedy film directed, written, produced by and starring Chelsea Peretti. It co-stars Blake Anderson, Kate Berlant, Megan Mullally, Benito Skinner, Megan Stalter, Jak Knight, Max Greenfield, and Amy Poehler.

The film is Peretti's directorial debut, and her first film as writer and producer; she stars as Sam Clifford, a first-time female director.

== Cast ==
- Chelsea Peretti as Sam Clifford
- Blake Anderson as Corden
- Kate Berlant as Clara Ann
- Megan Mullally as Marjory
- Benito Skinner as Rudy
- Megan Stalter as Davina
- Jak Knight as Simon
- Max Greenfield as Robbie
- Brad Hall as Miles Paris
- Tim Heidecker as Greggy Thompson
- Natasha Leggero as Thimberly Paris
- Amy Poehler as Meg
- Andy Richter as Sheldonn Clifford
- Xosha Roquemore as Star
- Numa Perrier as Maya
- Jordan Peele as Mystery Coach
- Adam Scott as Acting Coach
- Nick Kroll as Clyde
- Nicole Byer as Cerritos
- Stephanie Beatriz as Lisa
- Grace Reiter as Protester Rebecca

== Production ==
In July 2022, it was announced that Chelsea Peretti would make her feature directorial debut for the film First Time Female Director, and also star, write, and produce alongside Amy Poehler, Kate Arend, and Jordan Grief for Paper Kite Productions, and Deanna Barillari. Production companies involved include Paper Kite Productions, MarVista Entertainment, and Fox Entertainment.

The film wrapped principal photography in Los Angeles, California, in July 2022.

== Release ==
The film had its world premiere at the 2023 Tribeca Film Festival on June 12, 2023. Prior to the premiere, Roku acquired distribution rights to the film. It was released on March 8, 2024.

== Reception ==
The review aggregator website Rotten Tomatoes reported a 36% approval rating with an average rating of 5.0/10, based on 14 critic reviews. Metacritic, which uses a weighted average, assigned a score of 40 out of 100 based on 6 critics, indicating "mixed or average reviews".
