= Caryl Kristensen =

American comedian (born 1960)

- Born: November 23, 1960 (age 65); United States
- Other name: The Mommies

Comedy career
- Medium: Stand-up comedy, television
- Genre: Feminist comedy

Caryl J. Kristensen (née McKellogg; born November 23, 1960) is an American businessperson and former comedian who was one-half of the comedy troupe The Mommies. The duo had a half-hour sitcom, called The Mommies, that ran from 1993 to 1995 and a daytime talk show, Caryl & Marilyn: Real Friends, which ran during the 1996–1997 season.

Kristensen, the ninth of eleven children, graduated from Rosary High School in Fullerton, California, in 1978 and California State University, Chico, with a degree in graphic design. She is married to contractor Len Kristensen; they have two sons, Eric and Bryce.

== Post-comedy career ==
From 2004 to 2011, Kristensen was a college counselor at Campbell Hall School. Since 2009, Kristensen has been chief operating officer of video interview service ZipIntro.
