= Benito Skinner =

American comedian and actor (born 1993)

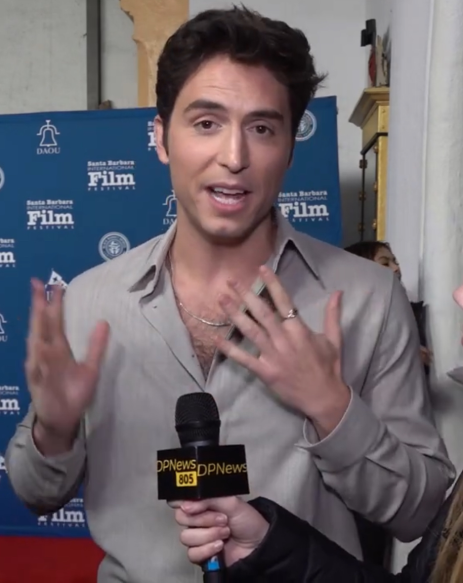
- Skinner in 2024
- Born: November 3, 1993 (age 33); Boise, Idaho, U.S.
- Education: Georgetown University
- Occupations: Actor; comedian
- Known for: Benny Drama

Benito Skinner (born November 3, 1993) is an American comedian and actor. He is known for his online persona Benny Drama, and performs celebrity impressions, skits, and original characters on platforms such as Instagram, YouTube, and TikTok.

In 2025, Skinner created and starred in Overcompensating for Amazon Prime Video.

== Early life and education ==
Skinner was born and raised in Boise, Idaho, and attended Bishop Kelly High School. His family is Catholic, but he has said they "weren't really practicing". While a senior in high school, Skinner founded the nonprofit OATHS, which stands for Organization Assisting the Homeless Student, and was recognized at the 2011 National Philanthropy Day Idaho. He also played on Bishop Kelly's football team as a wide receiver.

Some of his early comedic inspirations were Robin Williams in his role as Mrs. Doubtfire, and SpongeBob SquarePants. While he would perform renditions of Britney Spears and Destiny's Child songs for his family, he has discussed repressing some of his early proclivities toward performance and comedy due to bullying and homophobic comments.

He went on to attend Georgetown University in Washington, D.C., where he studied acting, English, and film and media studies. In college, Skinner began experimenting with performance in the form of recorded lip syncs and other videos. He had created the @BennyDrama7 Instagram account in high school — with the "7" referencing his football jersey number — but only began to post comedic videos while in college.

While at Georgetown, Skinner was also the co-creator and host of BEAT$, a weekly campus radio show known for its pop music stylings.

== Career ==
After graduating, Skinner worked as a video editor while continuing to create online content. In 2016, Skinner made his social media accounts public, and this early work developed into comedy videos on Instagram, TikTok, and YouTube. He is known for his celebrity impressions of, e.g., Shawn Mendes, Lana Del Rey, and Kourtney Kardashian, as well as for original characters, including Jenni the Hairdresser. He has described his work as fully rooted in pop culture.

In 2018, he performed his debut show "Overcompensating" at Carolines on Broadway to a sold-out audience at the New York Comedy Festival. He hosted the pop culture podcast Obsessed with Mary Beth Barone on Spotify for one season and 50 episodes. Skinner and Barone launched a pop culture podcast, Ride, in 2023.

Skinner gained notoriety in 2021 for filming a series of TikToks with the White House. He acted as a character nicknamed the “Gen Z intern” and urged young people to obtain COVID-19 vaccines. In 2023, Skinner was listed under Forbes 30 Under 30 in the social media category.

In 2024, Skinner starred in Chelsea Peretti's first feature, First Time Female Director. In 2025, he hosted the press conference organized by Spotify for Lady Gaga's Mayhem album release and interviewed the singer. The same year, Skinner created the series Overcompensating for Amazon Prime Video. In February 2026, he appeared in the music video for Maisie Peters' single "My Regards".

== Personal life ==
Skinner is gay and came out in his senior year of college. He was in a relationship with director and photographer Terrence O'Connor from 2016 to 2025. They resided in Los Angeles, California. They were known for their elaborate and carefully constructed annual couples' Halloween costumes.

== Filmography ==
Year	Title	Role	Notes
2019	Hitbox	Scooter	Episode: "Climax"
2021	Search Party	Nate	Episode: "Home Again, Home Again, Jiggity-Jig"
2021–2022	Ziwe	Kim Kardashian / Willet	2 episodes
2022	Queer as Folk	Jack Cole Jordan	4 episodes
2022	The Kardashians	Himself	Episode: "Bucket List Goals"
2023	First Time Female Director	Rudy	
2024	Curb Your Enthusiasm	Salesman	Episode: "The Lawn Jockey"
2025	Idiotka	Jonathan Smith	
2025–present	Overcompensating	Benny Scanlon	Also creator, writer and executive producer
2026	The Comeback	Carter	Episode: "Valerie Faces Reality"

== Awards and nominations ==
Organization	Year	Category	Nominated work	Result
Las Culturistas Culture Awards	2025	Filet Mignon Award for Best Beef	Overcompensating	Won
