= Overcompensating (TV series) =

2025 American comedy television series

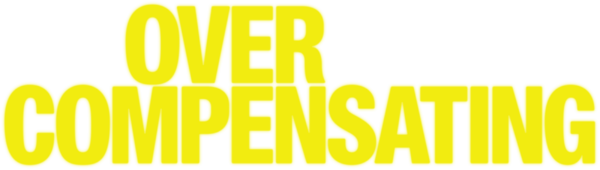
- Genre: Comedy; Coming-of-age
- Created by: Benito Skinner
- Directed by: Daniel Gray Longino; Desiree Akhavan
- Starring: Benito Skinner; Wally Baram; Mary Beth Barone; Adam DiMarco; Rish Shah
- Music by: Alex Somers
- Country of origin: United States
- Original language: English
- No. of seasons: 1
- No. of episodes: 8

Production
- Executive producers: Benito Skinner; Scott King; Jonah Hill; Matt Dines; Alison Goodwin; Charli XCX; Daniel Gray Longino; Josh Bachove; Alli Reich; Sam French
- Producers: Jordan Mendoza; Pat Regan; Natalie Teter
- Cinematography: Robert Scarborough
- Editor: Todd Downing
- Running time: 32–38 minutes
- Production companies: The Ladies Auxiliary; Benny Drama; Strong Baby Productions; A24; Amazon MGM Studios

Original release
- Network: Amazon Prime Video
- Release: May 15, 2025 – present

Overcompensating is an American comedy television series created by Benito Skinner for Amazon Prime Video. Skinner stars as Benny, a former high-school jock and closeted college student navigating freshman year. The series premiered on May 15, 2025, on Amazon Prime Video and is based on Skinner's own college experience meeting a woman who became his best friend and helped him come out.

In September 2025, the series was renewed for a second season, which is set to premiere on February 17, 2027.

== Premise ==
Benny, a former high school football star and valedictorian from Idaho, begins his freshman year of college at the fictional Yates University, where his sister Grace is a junior. He is a closeted gay man and masks his true identity by aping the machismo of his male peers, particularly that of Peter, Grace's jock boyfriend. On his first day on campus, Benny befriends Carmen, a freshman from New Jersey who was an outsider in high school. Together, Benny and Carmen navigate their first year of college, which includes new relationships, pledging the college's secret society, and figuring out their true selves.

== Cast and characters ==
=== Main ===
- Benito Skinner as Benny "Bento" Scanlon, a college freshman struggling with the realization that he is gay
- Wally Baram as Carmen Neil, Benny's new best friend, also a freshman
- Mary Beth Barone as Grace Scanlon, Benny's older sister
- Adam DiMarco as Peter Whitney, Grace's boyfriend and a member of the Flesh & Gold secret society
- Rish Shah as Miles Hari, Benny's frat brother and crush
- Holmes as Hailee Matthews (season 2; recurring season 1), Carmen's "wild child" roommate

=== Recurring ===
- Lukas Gage as Sammy, Benny's friend from high school
- Owen Thiele as George, a gay student who works as a cashier at the local convenience store
- Corteon Moore as Gabe, a close friend of Peter's and fellow Flesh & Gold member
- Elias Azimi as Chris
- Alexandra Beaton as Bridget
- Robbie G.K. as Riley
- Charlie Larsen as Dean
- Austin Lindsay as Trey, Benny's roommate
- Julia Shiplett as Mimi
- Nell Verlaque as Emily
- Tomaso Sanelli as Trent
- Kaia Gerber as Esther
- David Klein as Adam

=== Guest ===
- Connie Britton as Kathryn Scanlon, Benny and Grace's mother
- Maddie Phillips as Gigi
- Tommy Do as Kevin
- Rachel Matthews as a Yates student
- Megan Fox as a poster of herself
- Kyle MacLachlan as John Scanlon, Benny and Grace's father
- Yasmine Sahid as Courtney
- Didi Conn as Janet
- James Van Der Beek as Charlie, a Yates alumnus and former leader of Flesh & Gold
- Boman Martinez-Reid as Paulie
- Carolyn Scott as Carol
- Charli XCX as herself
- Caleb Hearon as CJ
- Claire Qute as Sloan
- Bowen Yang as Davis
- Matt Rogers as Jared
- Andrea Martin as Yates Dean

== Episodes ==
Season	Episodes	Originally released
1	8	May 15, 2025
2	8	February 17, 2027

=== Season 1 (2025) ===
No. overall	No. in season	Title	Directed by	Written by	Original release date
1	1	"Lucky"	Daniel Gray Longino	Benito Skinner	May 15, 2025
Two freshmen students from opposite sides of the tracks of life form an unlikely friendship on their first day of college.
2	2	"Who's That Girl"	Daniel Gray Longino	Benito Skinner	May 15, 2025
Feeling that he's lacking in college, Benny decides to have an impromptu dorm-room party in order to establish his friend group. Meanwhile, Carmen tries to score a fake ID.
3	3	"Black and Yellow"	Daniel Gray Longino	Benito Skinner & Scott King	May 15, 2025
To avoid his feelings for Miles, Benny begins to spend extra time with Carmen. Carmen begins to struggle as the anniversary of her brother's death arrives. Grace tries to find her own identity outside of Peter.
4	4	"Boom Clap"	Desiree Akhavan	Mitra Jouhari	May 15, 2025
On the outs with each other, Benny and Carmen decide to focus their energy on getting into the university's exclusive group, Flesh and Gold, where they are subjected to extreme challenges in order to get in. Grace gets a chance to prove herself at a Charli XCX concert, but doesn't get the support she needs from Peter. Elsewhere, Peter gets a realization that his time as the big shot on campus is up.
5	5	"Scary Monsters and Nice Sprites"	Desiree Akhavan	Benito Skinner	May 15, 2025
After the disastrous concert, Peter and Carmen begin to grow closer. As Halloween arrives, Benny thinks Miles is ready to be a couple, but hits a major setback. Grace tries to reconnect with a former friend.
6	6	"The Edge of Glory"	Desiree Akhavan	Jordan Mendoza & Benito Skinner & Scott King	May 15, 2025
After Benny comes out to Carmen, she decides to help him ease into gay life by setting him up on his first Grindr date. After his self-image takes a hit, Peter begins to spiral and decides to sabotage the only thing dear to him. Grace makes a discovery of her own.
7	7	"Welcome to the Black Parade"	Desiree Akhavan	Benito Skinner & Scott King	May 15, 2025
With no plans of her own, Carmen decides to tag along with Benny and Grace for an Idaho Thanksgiving that's filled with bar fights, karaoke, and facing old demons. Meanwhile, Carmen struggles with a secret she is keeping from Grace.
8	8	"Crown on the Ground"	Daniel Gray Longino	Benito Skinner & Scott King	May 15, 2025
It's finals week, but the only test these students are facing is relationships. Carmen forces Benny to explain his web of lies, Peter goes to get what's his, Hailee wants to know where her performance enhancing meds are, and Miles wonders what he did wrong. Answers lead to more questions at the final Bader House party of the semester, where many shocking reveals occur.

=== Season 2 ===
No. overall	No. in season	Title	Directed by	Written by	Original release date
9	1	TBA	TBA	Benito Skinner	February 17, 2027
10	2	TBA	TBA	Benito Skinner	February 17, 2027
11	3	TBA	TBA	Benito Skinner & Pat Regan & Scott King	February 17, 2027
12	4	TBA	TBA	Benito Skinner & Wally Baram & Scott King	February 17, 2027
13	5	TBA	TBA	Benito Skinner & Scott King	February 17, 2027
14	6	TBA	TBA	Benito Skinner & Scott King	February 17, 2027
15	7	TBA	TBA	Benito Skinner	February 17, 2027
16	8	TBA	TBA	Benito Skinner	February 17, 2027

== Production ==
=== Development ===
Creator Benito Skinner debuted the title Overcompensating with his 2018 live comedy show followed by a year-long cross country tour. This led Skinner to the idea for the television series, thus working on the script for four years starting in 2020. During pre-production, main writers Skinner and Scott King collaborated with comedian friends, Mary Beth Barone and Wally Baram, who later auditioned and were cast in the roles of the main female leads. Nick Pepper, head of wholly owned content at Amazon MGM Studios, greenlit the project saying, "The moment we heard this story from Benny, we knew it was an irresistible, bold story that would captivate and inspire our global Prime Video customers". In November 2022, it was announced Amazon Prime Video had put the project in development with Benito Skinner writing and executive producing alongside Jonah Hill under his Strong Baby banner, and A24 producing. In February 2024, the series announced a new go-ahead for development months before filming.

On September 10, 2025, Amazon Prime Video renewed the series for a second season, after Vernon Sanders, Amazon's head of global television, had previously confirmed in July 2025 that the writer's room for season two had already begun.

=== Casting ===
Upon the initial announcement, Skinner was set to star. In July 2024, Wally Baram, Mary Beth Barone, Adam DiMarco and Rish Shah joined the cast in series regular capacity, while Holmes, Corteon Moore, Owen Thiele, and Nell Verlaque were set to recur. In September, Connie Britton, Kyle MacLachlan, Kaia Gerber, Julia Shiplett, Tommy Do, Alexandra Beaton, Claire Qute, Elias Azimi and Maddie Phillips joined the cast in undisclosed capacity. In October, Charli XCX and Tomaso Sanelli joined the cast in guest and recurring capacity, respectively.

On June 10, 2026, Holmes was promoted to series regular for the second season, while Tom Francis, Aisha Dee and AnnaSophia Robb were cast in recurring capacities.

=== Filming ===
Filming for Overcompensating primarily took place in Toronto in eight-week blocks until late September 2024. Benito Skinner was inspired by the University of Toronto's landscape and buildings which reminded him of his alma mater, Georgetown University. The University of Toronto's Victoria College served as the backdrop for the show's Yates' campus. Once production moved to Los Angeles in late September, they shot most of the party and off-campus scenes around the city in neighborhoods such as Echo Park and Silver Lake; as well as studio soundstages. Principal photography began on July 8, 2024, and wrapped on October 16, 2024.

=== Soundtrack ===
Overcompensating's soundtrack was created by music supervisors Jen Malone and Nicole Weisberg, alongside Charli XCX who served as the show's executive producer, music producer, and guest starred as herself in episode four titled "Boom Clap". In 2022, Skinner approached Charli XCX at a party asking if she would do music for a show he was working on; she asked for the script and promptly signed on. The show contains over 30 songs composed by Charli XCX with hits from her discography like "Boom Clap" and "I Love It". Because of the script's ties to pop culture and Skinner's own life experiences with music, Malone and Weisberg worked with Charli XCX in pursuing the rights to specific songs like "Lucky" by Britney Spears and the "George of the Jungle" theme song.

== Reception ==
=== Critical response ===
On the review aggregator website Rotten Tomatoes, 94% of 47 critics' reviews are positive. The website's consensus reads: "As ribald as any self-respecting campus comedy but with a disarmingly sweet core, Overcompensating has nothing to make up for as it proves creator-star Benito Skinner to be the real deal." Metacritic, which uses a weighted average, assigned the series a score of 72 out of 100, based on 21 critics, indicating "generally favorable" reviews.

Daniel Fienberg of The Hollywood Reporter wrote: "It's a confident and generally funny series-creating debut for well-regarded content creator Skinner, and the cast is packed with breakout performances from lesser-known co-stars, amusing turns from more familiar stars and cameos aplenty". Emma Kiely of Collider gave the series an eight of ten, writing: "A hilarious, warm, and honest show from one of comedy's most exciting voices".

Inkoo Kang of The New Yorker commented on Skinner's transition from the Internet comedy space to writing a poignant coming-of-age story by saying, "Skinner, perhaps best known until now as an internet comedian, smuggles in his commentary on gender relations and sexuality via absurdist sequences and an impressive joke density."

=== Accolades ===
Year	Award	Category	Recipient(s)	Result	Ref.
2025	2nd Gotham TV Awards	Breakthrough Comedy Series	Benito Skinner, Josh Bachove, Matt Dines, Sam French, Alison Goodwin, Jonah Hill, Scott King, Daniel Gray Longino, Alli Reich and Charli XCX	Nominated	
2025	2nd Gotham TV Awards	Outstanding Performance in a Comedy Series	Benito Skinner	Nominated	
2026	41st Independent Spirit Awards	Best Breakthrough Performance in a New Scripted Series	Wally Baram	Nominated	
2026	37th GLAAD Media Awards	Outstanding New TV Series	Overcompensating	Nominated	
