= Holmes (actor) =

American comedian (born 1993)

- Born: Chelsea Elizabeth Holmes; 29 July 1993 (age 33)
- Education: Florida State University (BA)
- Occupations: Comedian; actor; writer
- Known for: Welcome to Flatch

Chelsea Elizabeth Holmes (born July 29, 1993), known mononymously as Holmes, is an American comedian, actor, and writer, best known for Welcome to Flatch, Overcompensating and Hacks.

== Early life and education ==
Holmes was born on July 29, 1993, in Texas and grew up in Nebraska. When they were in the middle of high school, their family moved to Florida.

Holmes graduated from Florida State University in 2016 with a Bachelor of Arts degree in English Language and Literature. They wrote for The Eggplant, FSU's satirical news source, and worked at the FSU radio station WVFS.

== Career ==
Holmes moved to Chicago to pursue improvisational comedy and worked odd jobs to support herself. She worked "at the gym, the butcher shop, and an escape room" while performing improv and stand-up in the evenings. "When I was younger, I broke it to myself that you're going to still create art and your job doesn't have to be your passion," Holmes told The Advocate. During this time, she started posting improv videos on Twitter.

In January 2020, filmmaker Paul Feig, having come across her Twitter, invited Holmes to audition for a lead role in the Fox sitcom Welcome to Flatch (2022–2023). She filmed the pilot in March 2020, before the production was shuttered owing to the COVID-19 pandemic. Seven months later, Holmes moved to North Carolina to resume filming for the rest of the show.

In 2022, Holmes hosted The Pansexual Bachelor in Los Angeles, as part of the Netflix Is a Joke Festival, where 18 contestants battled onstage to win her over. In 2023, she collaborated with comedian Caleb Hearon on a comedy pilot about two queer friends living in Kansas City, Missouri. It was bought by Jax Media and is currently under production with Our Lady J as the showrunner.

Holmes appeared in Free Time (2024), Jackpot! (2024), Krapopolis (2024–2025), It's Florida, Man (2024), and Another Simple Favor (2025). She auditioned to play Carmen in Overcompensating (2025), but was cast as Hailee instead.

In 2025, Holmes joined the cast of Trash Mountain, written by Hearon and Ruby Caster and executive produced by Lilly Wachowski.

== Personal life ==
Holmes identifies as genderqueer and pansexual and uses she/they pronouns.

== Filmography ==
=== Film ===
Year	Title	Role	Notes
2017	Emma Inspired	Emma	Short film
2018	Snugglr	Scrunchie	Short film
2018	Terrible Accident at the Bread Factory	Ellen	Short film
2020	I Love My Upstairs Neighbor	Chelsea	Short film
2023	Free Time	Kim	
2023	Fintech	Cassie	Short film
2024	Jackpot	Rideshare Driver	
2025	Another Simple Favor	Val	
TBA	Trash Mountain	TBA	Filming

=== Television ===
Year	Title	Role	Notes
2019	The Megan Stalter Show	Intern Holmes	2 episodes
2022	Call Me Kat	Kelly Mallet	Episode: "Call Me Flatch"
2022–2023	Welcome to Flatch	Kelly Mallet	27 episodes
2023	Krapopolis	Prack the Unstoppable (voice)	2 episodes
2025	Hacks	Melanie	4 episodes
2025–present	Overcompensating	Hailee	8 episodes
