= The Mommies (comedy duo) =

American female comedy duo

- Born: United States
- Notable work: The Mommies; Caryl & Marilyn: Real Friends

Comedy career
- Medium: Stand-up comedy, television
- Genres: Feminist comedy, women's comedy
- Subjects: Everyday life, marriage, children, motherhood, suburbia

The Mommies is the name of an American female former comedy duo whose comedic trademark was their real-life tales of suburban life, domestication, family, marriage and other odds and ends.

The duo consisted of Marilyn Kentz and Caryl Kristensen, who met as neighbors in Petaluma, California in the late 1980s. It was their family and friends that convinced them that they should take a chance and start an act because they had a knack for comedy. Their act caught the attention of NBC, who saw potential in the team after one of the executives caught their performance on a TV show. They eventually signed a contract for a television show with NBC. The duo later hosted a talk show on ABC.

Since 2009, Kristensen has been chief operating officer of a video interview service, while Kentz returned to stand-up in 2014.

== TV series ==
In 1993 they landed their first major starring roles in The Mommies, a series loosely based on their family life and experiences as suburban neighbors in Petaluma, California. The series ran on NBC for two seasons, with 38 episodes made. It was produced by Paramount Network Television.

== Caryl & Marilyn: Real Friends ==
In 1996 the duo returned to TV with a daytime talk show called Caryl & Marilyn: Real Friends. The show was produced by Viacom Productions (now CBS Media Ventures) and aired on ABC for one year before being replaced by The View in 1997.

== The Mommies: A Musical Blog ==
Kentz and Kristensen contributed lyrics to a musical called The Mommies: A Musical Blog, which is advertised as a "90-minute party of laughter (and a few tears) that will remind you of all the reasons you became a mommie!" It premiered in Orlando, Florida in 2011. There have been no entries on the show's blog since September of that year.

== Other works ==
In addition to acting and writing, they are also worked with various causes from breast cancer awareness to parental rights. The duo also appeared in TV commercials for Palmolive liquid dish detergent.

== Marilyn Kentz ==
Kentz was born in Santa Rosa, California, in 1948. She performed solo as a stand-up. In May 2014 she performed her first show since the death of her husband on April 25, 2014, entitled "Will I Ever Wear a Bikini Again?" She lives in Berkeley, California.
