= The Mommies (TV series) =

American TV sitcom (1993–1995)

- Genre: Sitcom
- Created by: Terry Grossman; Kathy Speer
- Starring: Caryl Kristensen; Marilyn Kentz; Robin Thomas; Ashley Peldon; Shiloh Strong; Sam Gifaldi; Ryan Merriman; David Dukes; Julia Duffy; Lane Davies; Jere Burns
- Music by: Rich Eames; Scott Gale
- Country of origin: United States
- Original language: English
- No. of seasons: 2
- No. of episodes: 38

Production
- Executive producers: Terry Grossman; Tim O'Donnell; Kathy Speer
- Producers: Rick Newberger; Julie Tsutsui
- Cinematography: Darryl Palagi; George Spiro Dibie
- Editors: Michael Weitzman; Frank Mazzaro
- Camera setup: Multi-camera
- Running time: 30 minutes
- Production companies: Speer-Grossman Productions; Paramount Television

Original release
- Network: NBC
- Release: September 18, 1993 – June 10, 1995

The Mommies is an American sitcom television series created by Terry Grossman and Kathy Speer that aired on NBC from September 18, 1993, to June 10, 1995.

NBC originally canceled The Mommies after one season along with other Saturday night sitcoms Café Americain and Nurses. Due to increased ratings during summer reruns, NBC renewed the series for midseason with some tweaks in format (as well as its title shortened to simply Mommies). However, the ratings dropped again in season 2, and the series was pulled in the spring of 1995, with its final episode being burned off over the summer.

== Synopsis ==
The series was loosely based on the real-life personas of Caryl Kristensen and Marilyn Kentz (aka The Mommies) as suburban neighbors and their families in Petaluma, California. Episodes focused on how they dealt with parenting and modern-day issues. The duo also co-produced and co-wrote the series. Neighbors "Perfect Mom" Barb Ballantine (Julia Duffy) and "Mr. Mom" Tom Booker (Jere Burns) were introduced in the middle of season one with Duffy becoming a series regular.

Season two brought several changes to the series. Jere Burns was upgraded to series regular, Paul Kellogg was recast, Marilyn got divorced, and Barb's never before seen husband (played by fellow Newhart alum Peter Scolari) became recurring. Also, laugh track usage was reduced.

== Cast ==
=== Main ===
- Caryl Kristensen as Caryl Kellogg: Marilyn's neighbor and Blake, Danny & Zachary's mother
- Marilyn Kentz as Marilyn Larson: Caryl's neighbor and Adam & Kasey's mother
- Robin Thomas (season 1) & Lane Davies (season 2) as Paul Kellogg: Caryl's husband and Blake, Danny & Zachary's father
- Ashley Peldon as Kasey Larson: Marilyn & Jack's daughter
- Shiloh Strong as Adam Larson: Marilyn & Jack's son
- Sam Gifaldi as Danny Kellogg: Caryl & Paul's younger son
- Ryan Merriman as Blake Kellogg: Caryl & Paul's older son
- David Dukes as Jack Larson: Marilyn's husband and Adam & Kasey's father
- Julia Duffy as Barb Ballantine: Caryl & Marilyn's neighbor
- Jere Burns as Tom Booker: Caryl & Marilyn's other neighbor and Beth & Jason's stay-at-home father (1994-1995: recurring, season 1; main, season 2)

=== Recurring ===
- Jennifer Blanc as Tiffany (1993–1994)
- Peter Scolari as Ken Ballantine: Barb's husband
- Courtney Peldon as Beth Booker: Tom's daughter (1994–1995)
- Justin Berfield as Jason Booker: Tom's son (1994–1995)

== Episodes ==
=== Series overview ===
Season	Episodes	Originally released	
Season	Episodes	First released	Last released
1	24	September 18, 1993	May 7, 1994
2	13	January 2, 1995	June 10, 1995

=== Season 1 (1993–94) ===
No. overall	No. in season	Title	Directed by	Written by	Original release date	Viewers (millions)
1	1	"Pilot"	Terry Hughes	Kathy Speer & Terry Grossman	September 18, 1993	N/A
2	2	"Those Lowdown Ultrasound Pink-or-Blues"	Terry Hughes	Linda Marr	September 25, 1993	12.0
3	3	"Death of a Crossing Guard"	Terry Hughes	Ellen Sandler & Cindy Chupack	October 2, 1993	11.2
4	4	"Take Me Out Anywhere But the Ballgame"	Terry Hughes	Michael Davidoff & Bill Rosenthal	October 9, 1993	14.0
5	5	"Much I Do About Nothing"	Terry Hughes	Michael Davidoff & Bill Rosenthal	October 16, 1993	12.3
6	6	"Revenge of the Mommies"	Terry Hughes	Nick LeRose	October 23, 1993	11.8
7	7	"I Got the Music in Me"	Terry Hughes	Lisa A. Bannick	November 6, 1993	10.9
8	8	"Doggie Dearest"	Terry Hughes	Nick LeRose	November 13, 1993	10.5
9	9	"Thanks, But No Thanksgiving"	Terry Hughes	Ellen Sandler & Cindy Chupack	November 20, 1993	10.4
10	10	"Friends and Mothers"	Terry Hughes	Linda Marr	November 27, 1993	11.7
11	11	"Sleeping Around"	Terry Hughes	Ellen Sandler & Cindy Chupack	December 9, 1993	20.7
12	12	"Christmas"	Gary Brown	Nick LeRose	December 11, 1993	10.0
13	13	"Quality Time"	Gary Brown	Michael Davidoff & Bill Rosenthal	December 18, 1993	9.2
14	14	"The Fight"	Gary Brown	Lisa A. Bannick	January 8, 1994	10.3
15	15	"Home Alone"	Terry Hughes	Nick LeRose	January 15, 1994	10.8
16	16	"The Old Man Cometh"	Gary Brown	Nick LeRose	January 29, 1994	9.7
17	17	"Bringing Home Baby"	Gary Brown	Linda Marr	February 5, 1994	10.5
18	18	"Five Minutes Apart"	Gary Brown	Linda Marr	February 5, 1994	10.5
19	19	"Valentine's Day"	Gary Brown	Michael Davidoff & Bill Rosenthal	February 12, 1994	10.2
20	20	"Mr. Mommie"	Gary Brown	Nick LeRose	March 19, 1994	12.7
21	21	"The Campfire Girls"	Gary Brown	Michael Davidoff & Bill Rosenthal	April 2, 1994	11.7
22	22	"A Day in the Life"	Gary Brown	Lisa A. Bannick	April 16, 1994	9.4
23	23	"Mommies Day"	Gary Brown	Linda Marr	May 7, 1994	8.8
24	24	"The Exercist"	Gary Brown	Ellen Sandler & Cindy Chupack	May 7, 1994	9.9

=== Season 2 (1995) ===
No. overall	No. in season	Title	Directed by	Written by	Original release date	Viewers (millions)
25	1	"Tom's Deal"	Art Dielhenn	Ellen Sandler & Cindy Chupack	January 2, 1995	11.5
26	2	"The Mother of All In-Laws"	Joanna Kerns	Ellen Sandler & Cindy Chupack	January 7, 1995	11.0
27	3	"Enter Christine"	Frank Bonner	Story by : Tim O'Donnell; Teleplay by : Nick LeRose	January 14, 1995	11.2
28	4	"Enter Ken"	Art Dielhenn	Nick LeRose	January 21, 1995	10.1
29	5	"Coming Apart"	Tim O'Donnell	Tim O'Donnell	January 28, 1995	10.5
30	6	"You Must Remember This"	Art Dielhenn	Rick Newberger	February 4, 1995	9.3
31	7	"I Do, I Do Again"	Frank Bonner	Rick Newberger	February 25, 1995	8.2
32	8	"The Dating Pool"	Art Dielhenn	Ellen Sandler & Cindy Chupack	March 4, 1995	10.6
33	9	"Who Am I?"	Joanna Kerns	Geoffrey Miller	March 18, 1995	11.2
34	10	"Mystery Ride"	Art Dielhenn	Michael Davidoff & Bill Rosenthal	March 18, 1995	11.7
35	11	"My Roof, My Rules"	Art Dielhenn	Linda Marr	March 25, 1995	8.6
36	12	"Selling Out"	Frank Bonner	Ellen Sandler & Cindy Chupack	April 3, 1995	12.1
37	13	"Four Mommies and a Funeral"	Frank Bonner	Nick LeRose	June 10, 1995	6.5

== Awards and nominations ==
Year	Award	Result	Category	Recipient
1992	Young Artist Awards	Nominated	Best Youth Comedienne in a TV Show	Ashley Peldon
1992	Young Artist Awards	Nominated	Best Performance: Young Actress in a TV Comedy Series	Courtney Peldon
1992	Young Artist Awards	Nominated	Best Performance by an Actress Under Ten in a TV Series	Ashley Peldon
1992	Young Artist Awards	Nominated	Best Performance by an Actor Under Ten in a TV Series	Sam Gifaldi
1994	Young Artist Awards	Nominated	Outstanding Youth Ensemble in a Television Series	Sam Gifaldi, Ryan Merriman, Ashley Peldon, Shiloh Strong and Joey Zimmerman
1994	Young Artist Awards	Nominated	Best Actor Under Ten in a Television Series or Show	Sam Gifaldi
