= Bobby Collins (comedian) =

American comedian

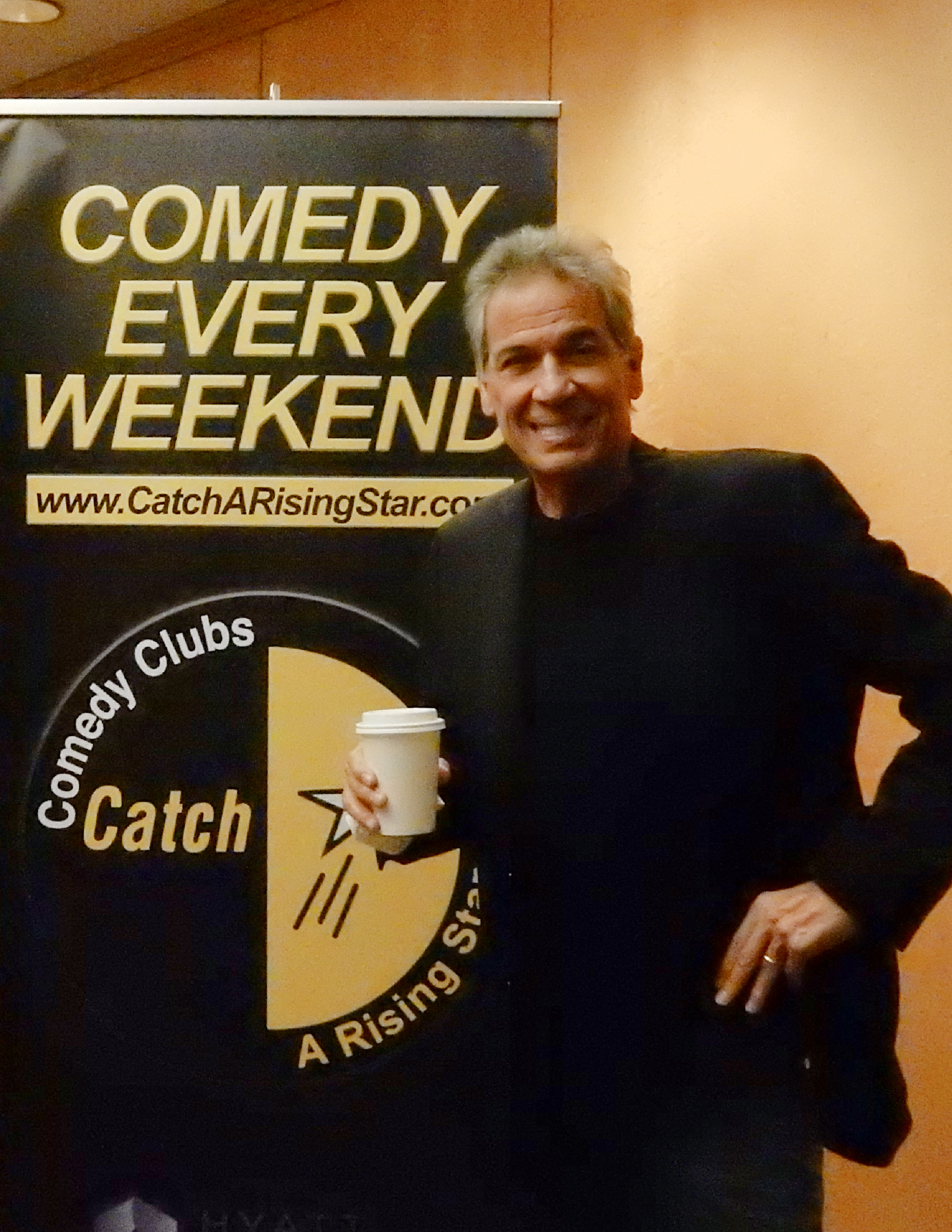
- Collins in 2023
- Born: Robert Edward Collins; New York, New York, United States

Comedy career
- Years active: 1980–present
- Medium: Stand-up, film, television
- Genre: Stand-up comedy
- Subject: Observational comedy
- Website: www.bobbycollins.com

Bobby Collins is an American stand-up comedian and film actor.

== Early life ==
A native of New York City, he was raised in Glen Oaks, Queens. He is the son of George and Margaret Collins and has two older brothers and one older sister. Collins attended New Hyde Park Memorial High School on Long Island and then went on to pursue a degree in history from the State University of New York at Buffalo. Collins taught high school in Buffalo as a substitute teacher for one year, then worked in the Garment District in New York City at Calvin Klein while pursuing a career at night in comedy.

Collins was named after his father's favorite comedian, Bob Hope.

== Career ==
Collins first worked at Catch a Rising Star Comedy Club on the Upper East Side of New York City and then went on to performing all over the city and in New Jersey.

He has opened for star performers including Frank Sinatra, Cher, Julio Iglesias, Tony Bennett and Dolly Parton.

Collins has also appeared in numerous television shows and movies, including the 2010 documentary film I Am Comic. He was Rosie O'Donnell's successor in hosting the TV show VH-1’s Standup Spotlight.

As of 2011 Collins appeared in over 200 live stand-up performances per year around the United States. He performs regularly on XM Satellite Radio.

Collins lives in Santa Monica, California, and he often uses the cultural tension between New York and Santa Monica in his routines.

=== Recordings ===
Over the course of his career, Collins has released six comedy albums: I'm on the Boat, Women and Children First, On the Inside, I Wanna Go Home, You’re Not Coming With Us, Mr. New York and Out of Bounds.

In April 2008 he released a DVD, Bobby Collins: Live From New York City.

=== Recognition ===
Bobby Collins was nominated for a CableACE Award as well as for the American Comedy Awards 1997 “Stand-up Comic of the Year.” A New York Post reviewer described him as a “perfect fusion of Dean Martin and Jerry Lewis.”
