= Feminist comedy =

Comedy subgenre

Feminist comedy refers to comedic acts and styles that further feminist principles, including gender equality and awareness of the social experience of gender. Comedy, the creative works with the intention of humor, has been historically dominated by men. The current comedy culture climate remains male-focused and is currently accepting of women comedians. The conversation surrounding gender-aware comedy has included articles and opinions from many male comedians and fans that are rooted in the idea that women aren’t funny, despite protest from successful female comedians and audiences. However, there is a difference between female humor and feminist humor. As a practice, feminist comedy is not solely comedy performed by women, as many women, especially early female comics, “served to reinforce… cultural stereotypes” and patriarchal views about women and gender. While some scholars have argued that this is because feminism may be antithetical to comedy, which is often described as an aggressive, necessarily masculine act in which the performer centers themselves, others have argued that humor's inclination to subvert hierarchies makes it a particularly effective communication platform for feminist comedians. Feminist comedy frequently references and discusses female-gendered issues and topics such as menstruation, rape, gender inequality, beauty norms, and machismo. Along the lines of intersectionality, which suggests that social identities and systems of oppression are interrelated, many feminist comedians also discuss homophobia, racism, and transphobia.

== History ==
Comedy was an important genre in the late 19th and early 20th centuries for mocking traditional gender norms and envisioning new societies that would be brought about through comic anarchy and playful upheaval. Popular stage and screen comediennes included Mabel Normand, Eva Tanguay, Louise Fazenda, Marie Dressler, and many others. In the early and mid-1960s, female comedians sometimes reinforced cultural stereotypes and patriarchal views about women and gender. Phyllis Diller, Joan Rivers, and Totie Fields were notable female comedians who talked about gender and societal views of gender in their comedy; however, their comedic acts were successful in large part due to their self-deprecation and declaring themselves as ugly or as not being successful at the gender roles forced upon them. Other notable early women in comedy, such as Mae West and Helen Kane, relied primarily on sex appeal in order to attract male audiences. These female comedians were able to achieve relative success in comedy culture, but only by reinforcing the roles of patriarchy and men in comedy.

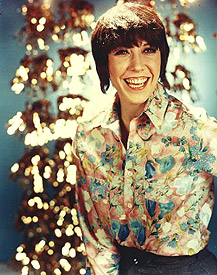
Lily Tomlin in 1970.

There are examples, however, of feminist comics who were able to gain traction as early as the 1960s, notably Lily Tomlin. Lily Tomlin's style of humor, which emphasizes sincerity in order to access humor, rather than portraying herself as a victim or victimizing others, has been described as a method through which her feminist view of acceptance can be received by the audience.

Comedians of the last twenty years, male and female, have progressively talked more about gender, societal, and racial expectations, especially as notable female comedians such as Tina Fey, Amy Poehler, and Amy Schumer have received recognition. These comedians and others frequently touch on perceptions and expectations in society that systemically oppress and exploit, which scholars have identified as key elements of feminist humor. In 1985, comedian Danitra Vance became the first African-American series regular on Saturday Night Live. Although this type of representation on television was groundbreaking, Vance found herself repeatedly cast in stereotypical roles and frequently spoke out about her frustrations regarding typecasting.

Feminist comedy also serves to be a place of refuge and comedic relief for other women. The intention of feminist comedy has evolved to incorporate the idea of comedy being written, "by women, for women". Others have pointed to male comedians such as George Carlin and Louis CK as being feminist; George Carlin, while largely dismissive of political correctness frequently espoused progressive ideas in his comedy, especially with regards to women's rights and abortion. His jokes about abortion opponents being anti-woman connect directly to what bell hooks described as a "feminist movement [urging] females to no longer see [themselves] and [their] bodies as the property of men". Louis C.K. frequently commented on the ways in which men oppress and exploit women, naming male violence explicitly with his line, "Men are the number one threat to women". However, the recent allegations against Louis CK of masturbating in front of at least five women, which Louis CK admitted to be true in a statement, complicate the way feminist male comics are received in comedy culture.

== Key themes ==
Feminist scholars sometimes disagree on what a feminist joke or feminist humor is. Some propose that feminist humor is essentially the humor of the oppressed: it perceives organized systems of oppression and exploitation and is based in the conviction that these systems are undesirable; therefore, feminist humor is based on visions of change. Others, however, explore feminist humor that simultaneously challenges and subverts patriarchy while avoiding divisiveness by focusing on a comedy of inclusivity. This comedy focuses on the shared experiences of women and gender norms, which serves to undermine the status quo by refusing to fall into patriarchal expectations of divisiveness.

== Queer comedy ==
Much of scholarly research and discussion surrounding feminist comedy comes from the historical background of many lesbian comedians. This is likely because lesbian humor subverts the expectations of a male-dominated space by being self-defined (comedy about lesbians by lesbians) and makes women, rather than men, the central focus. Perhaps one of the most widely known queer comedians is Ellen DeGeneres, who made television history when her character on her sitcom, The Ellen Show, came out as lesbian. DeGeneres herself had come out less than a month prior, and this announcement made her the first openly lesbian actor to play an openly lesbian title character. A prominent contemporary example of this is the comedy of Cameron Esposito and River Butcher, a formerly married couple who created the streaming series Take My Wife. The show centers on the real life couple and their lives as stand up comedians balancing work, their relationship, and gender barriers. Additionally, the show was lauded along intersectional feminist lines for its diversity and representation in actors. Queer roles are played exclusively by queer actors and comedians, queer women of color shared scenes together, and a trans actress was hired to play a role that was not specifically trans.

== Race and womanhood in comedy ==
There is a long history of women of color using comedy along both feminist and racially conscious lines . Black women especially have long used satire as a postmodern tool to destabilize expectations of race and gender, as well as to point to the cultural fictions that make the marginalization of black women possible. Black Radical feminist Florynce "Flo" Kennedy famously used humor to name and point her audience to racism, misogyny, and sexism. Contemporary examples such as Leslie Jones of Saturday Night Live similarly use satire of stereotypes as a method of black feminism. Jones received backlash after her first Saturday Night Live appearance in 2014, where she told a joke about breeding slaves. Jones later defended herself, stating that the joke, and all jokes about her African-American roots, was and are created as a way to channel her frustrations regarding her race and dating troubles. Jones explained that she took, "...something of pain and [made] it funny". By doing this, Jones takes a subject of oppression and turns it into both material for her comedy and for her feminist principles.

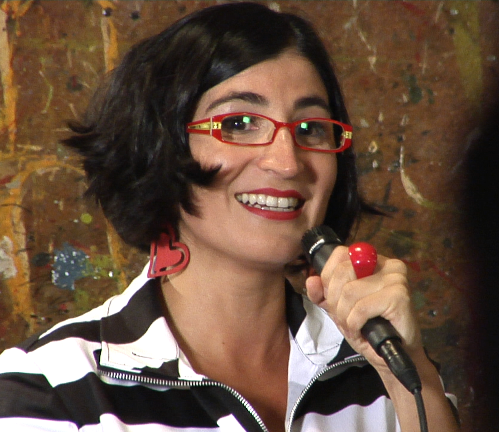
Negin Farsad in 2012.

Iranian-American Negin Farsad uses comedy as a way to fight Islamophobia. Her stand-up routine is composed of what she has described as "social justice comedy", in which she maintains a positive, charming attitude with her audience and allows them to ask questions regarding her race, religion, or anything that comes to mind. Farsad uses this material to gain a better understanding of how people perceive Islam and Muslims, and creates jokes that are humorous but informative.

Such actions are met with controversy, however, as some scholars have said that these representations risk reinforcing the racist and patriarchal narratives these comedians are attempting to undermine.

== Motherhood in comedy ==
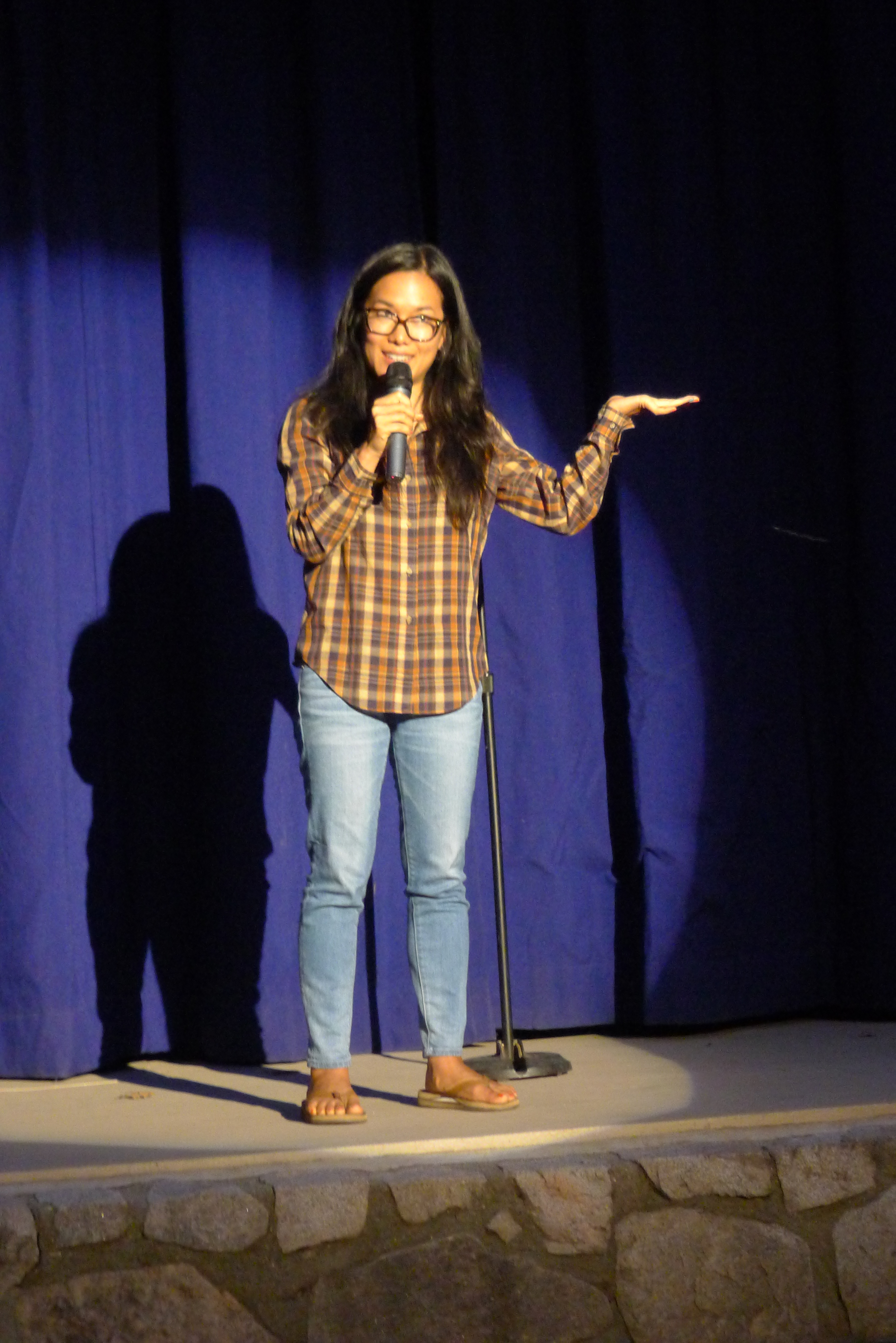
Ali Wong performing in 2013.

Motherhood is a growing topic of conversation in feminist comedy. Female comedians who hold the dual identities of mothers face a unique struggle; they are forced to prove themselves not only as comedians but as relevant in the field after bearing children.

Comedian Ali Wong is transparent about the experience of motherhood in her routines. She talks about the "roller coaster of emotions" involved in becoming a parent, and doesn't hold back in her descriptions of parenting and the challenges women face in proving their value in comparison to men.

Motherhood also holds a unique place in feminist comedy when it comes to societal expectations. Society tends to link womanhood with motherhood, and in doing so, those who do not bear children are often viewed as "deviant". Feminist comedians frequently challenge this expectation.
