= Red Scare (podcast) =

American culture and comedy podcast

- Genre: Cultural criticism; humor; politics
- Country of origin: United States
- Language: English

Cast and voices
- Hosted by: Anna Khachiyan; Dasha Nekrasova

Music
- Theme music composed by: Trevor Horn; Martin Kierszenbaum
- Opening theme: "All the Things She Said" by t.A.T.u

Production
- Production: Meg Murnane (Mar–Oct 2018), subsequently self-produced
- Length: 60–120 minutes

Technical specifications
- Audio format: MP3

Publication
- No. of episodes: 484
- Original release: March 29, 2018; 8 years ago

Related
- Website: redscarepodcast.libsyn.com

Red Scare is an American cultural commentary and humor podcast founded in March 2018 and hosted by Dasha Nekrasova and Anna Khachiyan.

The show was initially associated with the dirtbag left but is now associated with the new right and support for Donald Trump, as well as the subculture surrounding Dimes Square.

== Content ==
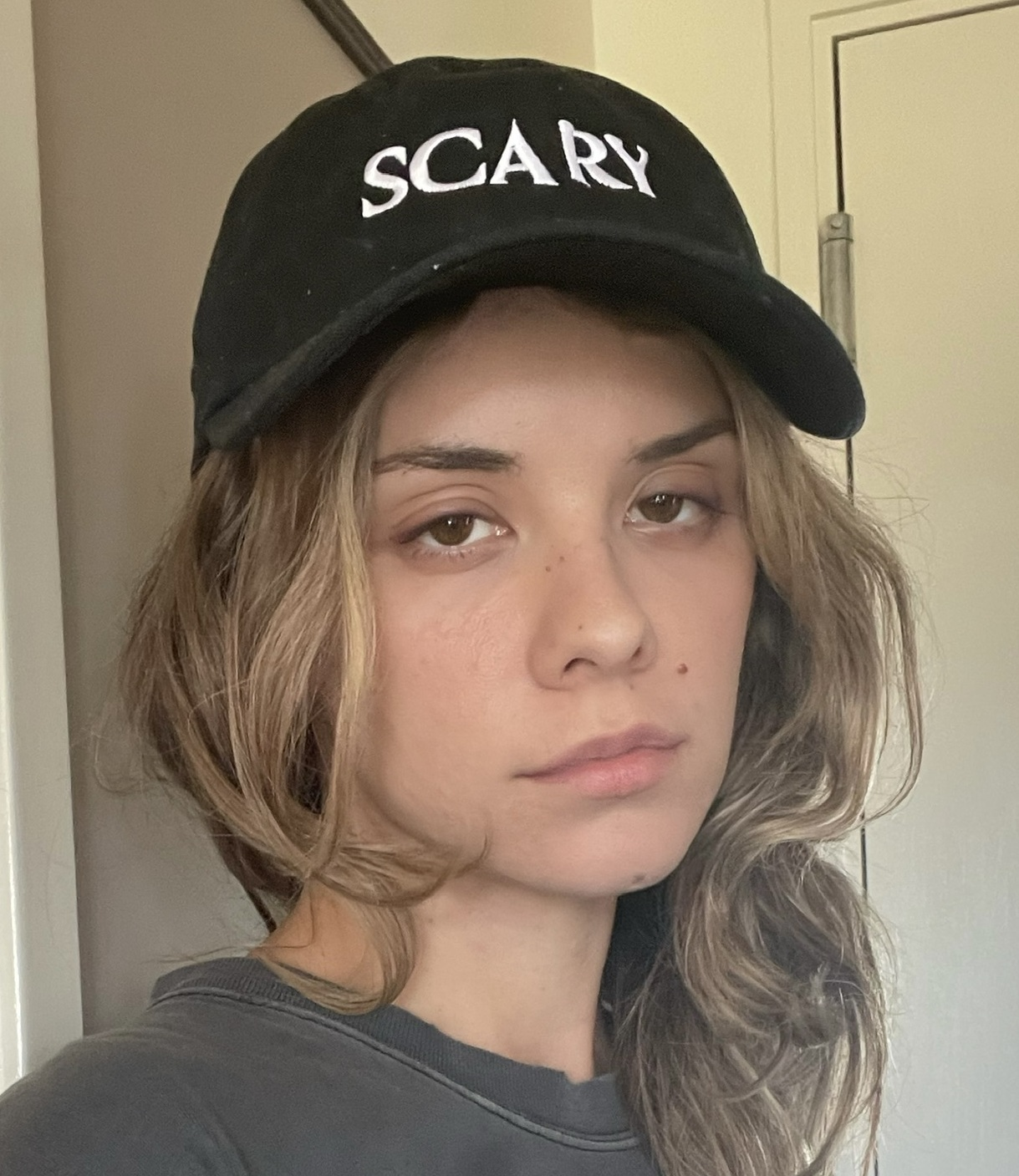
Red Scare co-host Dasha Nekrasova

Red Scare bills itself as a cultural commentary podcast hosted by self-described "bohemian layabouts" Dasha Nekrasova and Anna Khachiyan, and is recorded from their homes in Lower Manhattan, New York City. Nekrasova is a Belarus-born actress, who became known as "Sailor Socialism" after an interview with an InfoWars reporter went viral in 2018. She immigrated to Las Vegas, Nevada, with her acrobat parents when she was four. Khachiyan is a Moscow-born writer, art critic and daughter of Armenian mathematician Leonid Khachiyan. She was raised in New Jersey. The two women met on Twitter, and started the podcast in March 2018 after Nekrasova relocated to New York City from Los Angeles.

Early episodes were produced by Meg Murnane, who also appeared as the show's third co-host. She made her last appearance on the show in October 2018, and episodes have been self-produced since then. On an episode released on December 5, 2018, Nekrasova and Khachiyan announced that they had parted ways with Murnane "amicably and mutually."

The show covers current topics in American culture and politics and is a critique of neoliberalism and feminism in a manner both comedic and serious in tone. The hosts are influenced by the work of Mark Fisher, Slavoj Žižek, Camille Paglia, Michel Houellebecq and Christopher Lasch. Recurring topics include Russiagate, the #MeToo movement, woke consumerism and call-out culture.

Writers, artists, social commentators and cultural figures from across the political spectrum have appeared on Red Scare, including Elizabeth Bruenig, Angela Nagle, Elena Velez, Tulsi Gabbard, Glenn Greenwald, Steve Bannon, Tucker Carlson, Slavoj Žižek, Adam Curtis, Steve Sailer, Alex Jones, Curtis Yarvin, Nick Fuentes, Thomas Chatterton Williams, Ivy Wolk and Bryan Johnson. Nekrasova and Khachiyan have hosted several episodes of the show live, most notably broadcasting on NPR at The Green Space at WNYC and WQXR, as well as interviewing social media influencer Caroline Calloway at the Bell House in Brooklyn, and John Waters as part of NPCC fest. Khachiyan has been interviewed by Bret Easton Ellis and Eric Weinstein on their respective podcasts.

=== Format and availability ===
An episode of Red Scare is typically between 50 and 90 minutes long. The show's theme song is "All the Things She Said", the 2002 single by Russian pop duo t.A.T.u. Free episodes of the show are available via podcast hosting services such as Apple Podcasts and Spotify. Subscribers who contribute at least $5 per month via Patreon gain access to additional premium bonus episodes. As of February 2026, the show generated $38,800 per month, down from $58,000 in February 2022. Paid membership fell from 13,200 in November 2023 to 8,600 in April 2026.

=== Episode guide ===
As of November 19, 2026, 484 episodes of Red Scare have been released. The show's most frequent guest is photographer Dan Allegretto at nine appearances, followed by Amber A'Lee Frost of Chapo Trap House at seven appearances, and writer Patrik Sandberg and Glenn Greenwald at five appearances each.

2018 episodes

No.	Title	Guest(s)	Original release date	Notes
1	"InfoWhores"	—	March 29, 2018	—
2	"No Man's Land"	—	April 5, 2018	—
3	"Whore School!"	—	April 12, 2018	Cum Town's Adam Friedland has a cameo near the end of the episode
4	"Zuck My Dick"	—	April 19, 2018	—
5	"I Feel Petty"	—	April 28, 2018	—
6	"Nerd Prom"	Steven Phillips-Horst	May 4, 2018	—
7	"Me Talk Pretty One Day"	—	May 12, 2018	—
8	"Twink State Solution"	Adam Friedland	May 20, 2018	—
9	"Incel Special"	—	May 23, 2018	Premium episode #1
10	"RIP Jordan Peterson"	Naomi Fry	May 26, 2018	—
11	"ProAnna"	—	May 31, 2018	Premium episode #2
12	"Make American Gothic Again"	—	June 4, 2018	—
13	"Top Privilege"	—	June 7, 2018	—
14	"The Self Care Special"	—	June 9, 2018	Premium episode #3
15	"RIP Tony"	—	June 14, 2018	—
16	"Two Girls One Cup"	Leia Jospe	June 17, 2018	Premium episode #4, Meg is absent
17	"Daddy Issues"	Leia Jospe	June 22, 2018	Meg is absent
18	"Big Cunt Energy"	—	June 29, 2018	—
19	"Tell It to the Judge"	—	July 3, 2018	Premium episode #5
20	"THOT SAVE AMERICA"	—	July 6, 2018	—
21	"The Abortion Special with Elizabeth Bruenig"	Elizabeth Bruenig	July 10, 2018	Premium episode #6
22	"#MeThree"	—	July 14, 2018	—
23	"Russian Appropriation"	—	July 17, 2018	Premium episode #7
24	"Pussy Summit"	—	July 19, 2018	Meg is absent
25	"#AndIAsWell"	Amber A'Lee Frost	July 23, 2018	Premium episode #8
26	"Spy Privilege"	—	July 27, 2018	—
27	"Keeping Up with the Kushners"	—	August 1, 2018	—
28	"One Woman Comedy Wokefest"	—	August 9, 2018	Premium episode #9
29	"Hood Pass"	—	August 12, 2018	—
30	"Pabst Beer Pussies"	—	August 16, 2018	—
31	"Red Scare @ Union Hall 8/7/2018"	Steven Phillips-Horst	August 19, 2018	Premium episode #10, live show, Steven's 2nd episode
32	"Sloppy Steve"	—	August 24, 2018	—
33	"#ItsMeAgain"	—	August 28, 2018	Premium episode #11
34	"Reality Losers"	—	August 31, 2018	—
35	"Cuomo Shot"	Katherine Krueger	September 6, 2018	—
36	"ART thots"	—	September 8, 2018	Premium episode #12
37	"Fashion Victims Anonymous"	—	September 14, 2018	—
38	"Mea Culpa"	—	September 18, 2018	Premium episode #13
39	"Annie Madoff"	—	September 21, 2018	—
40	"McGuilt"	—	September 25, 2018	—
41	"Art Thots w/ Juliana Huxtable"	Juliana Huxtable	September 29, 2018	Premium episode #14, released for free on October 27, 2018
42	"Devil's Triangle"	—	October 4, 2018	—
43	"Alt Clit"	—	October 7, 2018	Premium episode #15
44	"Female Gays"	—	October 11, 2018	—
45	"A Star is Bored w/ Dan Allegretto"	Dan Allegretto	October 14, 2018	Premium episode #16
46	"The Climate is Cancelled"	Deanna Havas	October 18, 2018	—
47	"Red Scare Hotline w/ Anna & Meg"	—	October 22, 2018	Premium episode #17, Dasha is absent, Meg's final episode
48	"R*d Sc*re"	—	October 30, 2018	—
49	"Yaz Kween"	—	November 3, 2018	Premium episode #18
50	"Blue Scare"	—	November 8, 2018	—
51	"Bots will be Bots w/ Heidi Matthews"	Heidi Matthews	November 11, 2018	Premium episode #19
52	"Hillary 4.0"	—	November 14, 2018	—
53	"Post-Horny w/ Angela Nagle"	Angela Nagle	November 17, 2018	Premium episode #20, released for free on December 26, 2018
54	"#FreeAnna"	—	November 21, 2018	—
55	"LIVE @ UNION HALL 11/19/18"	Dan Allegretto & Amber A'Lee Frost	November 23, 2018	Premium episode #21, live show, Dan & Amber's 2nd episode
56	"K-Punk w/ Simon Reynolds"	Simon Reynolds	November 28, 2018	—
57	"PERFECT PUSSY"	—	December 1, 2018	Premium episode #22
58	"Protest Porn"	—	December 5, 2018	Dasha and Anna announce that Meg is not returning to the show
59	"FinGoth w/ Nick Mullen"	Nick Mullen	December 8, 2018	Premium episode #23
60	"Dasha Rubchinskiy"	Rachel Hershkovitz	December 12, 2018	—
61	"Houellebecq Girl"	—	December 15, 2018	Premium episode #24
62	"Dantifa"	Dan Allegretto	December 20, 2018	Dan's 3rd episode
63	"Rape Jokes w/ Vanessa Place"	Vanessa Place	December 22, 2018	Premium episode #25, released for free on April 3, 2019
64	"Another Hotline Ep"	—	December 29, 2018	Premium episode #26

2019 episodes

No.	Title	Guest(s)	Original release date	Notes
65	"Nopepunk"	—	January 5, 2019	Premium episode #27
66	"Slouching Towards Williamsburg"	—	January 11, 2019	—
67	"SEX REPORT w/ Kaitlin Phillips"	Kaitlin Phillips	January 14, 2019	Premium episode #28
68	"Big Macsculinity"	—	January 17, 2019	—
69	"Wammin's March"	—	January 20, 2019	Premium episode #29
70	"Your'e Fyred"	—	January 23, 2019	—
71	"#FreeDaddy"	—	January 27, 2019	Premium episode #30
72	"Cucker Tarlson"	—	January 31, 2019	—
73	"Jock Talk"	—	February 5, 2019	—
74	"Amber Alert w/ Amber A'Lee Frost"	Amber A'Lee Frost	February 10, 2019	Premium episode #31, Amber's 3rd episode, released for free on May 23, 2019
75	"You're Carceled"	—	February 13, 2019	—
Special	"RED SCARE VALENTINES DAY LOVE LINE LIVE"	—	February 14, 2019	Premium episode #32, live-streamed special
76	"Fake Noose"	—	February 21, 2019	—
77	"Step in the Name of Jihad"	—	February 24, 2019	Premium episode #33
78	"Cinema: Dead and Loving it w/ Nick Pinkerton"	Nick Pinkerton	February 28, 2019	—
79	"The Socialism of Small Differences"	—	March 6, 2019	—
80	"See You In Marvel"	—	March 10, 2019	Premium episode #34
81	"Yang Bang"	—	March 13, 2019	—
82	"Beto Males"	—	March 17, 2019	Premium episode #35
83	"Binge and Purge"	—	March 20, 2019	—
84	"Uncut Duca"	—	March 25, 2019	Premium episode #36
85	"Russigate w/ Michael Tracey"	Michael Tracey	March 28, 2019	—
86	"Red Scare LIVE at Punch Line, Philadelphia"	Dan Allegretto	March 31, 2019	Premium episode #37, live show, Dan's 4th episode
87	"Is Mussolini Obsolete?"	—	April 7, 2019	Premium episode #38
88	"Red Scare LIVE at The Bell House, New York"	Dan Allegretto	April 15, 2019	Premium episode #39, live show, Dan's 5th episode
89	"Paris is Burning"	—	April 16, 2019	—
90	"420 Special w/ Weed Slut 420"	Zoë Kestan	April 21, 2019	Premium episode #40
91	"Happiness w/ Amber A'Lee Frost"	Amber A'Lee Frost	April 24, 2019	Amber's 4th episode
92	"Dazed and Abused"	—	May 1, 2019	—
93	"Mentally Ill Meal"	—	May 4, 2019	Premium episode #41
94	"Camping w/ Patrik Sandberg"	Patrik Sandberg	May 9, 2019	—
95	"Sex Scabs"	—	May 13, 2019	Premium episode #42
96	"Shame Theory"	—	May 16, 2019	—
97	"Another Loveline"	—	May 20, 2019	Premium episode #43
98	"Podcels"	—	May 30, 2019	—
99	"Royally Fucked"	—	June 6, 2019	—
100	"The Zoo"	Adam Friedland	June 10, 2019	Premium episode #44, Adam's 2nd episode
101	"Woke Capitalism w/ Angela Nagle"	Angela Nagle	June 13, 2019	Angela's 2nd episode
102	"Sobes Story"	—	June 16, 2019	Premium episode #45
103	"Is it Camp?"	—	June 21, 2019	Premium episode #46
104	"Red Scare LIVE at The Greene Space, New York"	—	June 26, 2019	Live show
105	"How Soon is 2020?"	—	June 29, 2019	Premium episode #47
106	"A Return to Pod"	—	July 4, 2019	—
107	"Lolita Express"	—	July 11, 2019	—
108	"Sommartime Sadness"	—	July 14, 2019	Premium episode #48
109	"Squad Goals"	—	July 18, 2019	—
110	"Thots and Prayers"	Mecha	July 21, 2019	Premium episode #49
111	"Manhattan-Based Podcast"	—	July 25, 2019	—
112	"One Flew Over the Cuck's Nest w/ Patrik Sandberg"	Patrik Sandberg	July 28, 2019	Premium episode #50, Patrik's 2nd episode
113	"Once Upon a Time... in Dimes Square w/ Patrik Sandberg"	Patrik Sandberg	July 31, 2019	Patrik's 3rd episode
114	"Epstein 30330"	—	August 4, 2019	Premium episode #51
115	"Manhattan Murder Mystery"	—	August 13, 2019	—
116	"Unfulfillment Center"	—	August 17, 2019	Premium episode #52
117	"First as Tragedy, Then as LARP"	—	August 21, 2019	—
118	"Dead End Hijab"	—	August 24, 2019	Premium episode #53
119	"Jeff's Addiction"	—	August 30, 2019	—
120	"Chinatown Bitch"	—	September 4, 2019	Premium episode #54
121	"A Sand Pod w/ Ariana Reines"	Ariana Reines	September 10, 2019	—
122	"Justin Trudeaulezol"	—	September 22, 2019	—
123	"Greta Fucking Thunberg!"	—	September 25, 2019	Premium episode #55, released for free on November 7, 2019
124	"Forever 2020"	—	October 1, 2019	—
125	"Red Scare LIVE at The Bell House, New York w/ Caroline Calloway"	Dan Allegretto & Caroline Calloway	October 4, 2019	Premium episode #56, live show, Dan's 6th episode
126	"Sephoria"	—	October 8, 2019	—
127	"Why So Horny?"	—	October 12, 2019	Premium episode #57
128	"Another Loveline"	—	October 16, 2019	—
129	"Mark Cuckerberg"	—	October 26, 2019	Premium episode #58
130	"Sleeveless w/ Natasha Stagg"	Natasha Stagg	October 30, 2019	—
131	"Ok Doomer"	—	November 9, 2019	Premium episode #59
132	"Pest Control"	—	November 13, 2019	—
133	"Bore Carnival"	—	November 17, 2019	Premium episode #60
134	"Massage Story"	—	November 20, 2019	—
135	"Female Trouble"	—	November 24, 2019	Premium episode #61
136	"Tell Your Kids This is a SWERF"	—	November 27, 2019	—
137	"Yet Another Loveline"	—	December 1, 2019	Premium episode #62
138	"Soul Psycho"	—	December 8, 2019	—
139	"Nailed to the Cross"	—	December 15, 2019	Premium episode #63
140	"Botoxic Masculinity"	—	December 19, 2019	—
141	"TERF Wars"	—	December 23, 2019	Premium episode #64
142	"A Very Amber Christmas"	Amber A'Lee Frost	December 27, 2019	Amber's 5th episode

2020 episodes

No.	Title	Guest(s)	Original release date	Notes
143	"Not Really Red Scare w/ Paul Cupo and Patrik Sandberg"	Paul Cupo & Patrik Sandberg	January 2, 2020	Premium episode #65, Patrik's 4th episode
144	"Desert Shitstorm"	—	January 6, 2020	—
145	"Grimes Disease"	—	January 10, 2020	Premium episode #66, released for free on May 6, 2020
146	"Don't Trad on Me"	—	January 17, 2020	—
147	"Little Wammin w/ Patrik Sandberg"	Patrik Sandberg	January 21, 2020	Premium episode #67, Patrik's 5th episode
148	"Bernie Broads"	—	January 25, 2020	—
149	"Meddling Moira"	—	February 1, 2020	Premium episode #68
150	"Aloha, Bitches w/ Tulsi Gabbard"	Tulsi Gabbard	February 3, 2020	—
151	"Rat King"	—	February 9, 2020	Premium episode #69
152	"Make Americana Great Again"	—	February 12, 2020	—
153	"Valentine's Days Love Line"	—	February 15, 2020	Premium episode #70
154	"Memechausen's"	—	February 18, 2020	—
155	"Birthday Blues"	—	February 20, 2020	Premium episode #71, released for free on May 10, 2020
156	"Doop Lab"	—	February 25, 2020	—
157	"Misanthropy Scene"	—	February 29, 2020	Premium episode #72
158	"Killary Shillton"	—	March 11, 2020	—
159	"Age of Decadence w/ Ross Douthat"	Ross Douthat	March 14, 2020	Premium episode #73
160	"Corona Crush w/ Ben Mora"	Ben Mora	March 17, 2020	—
161	"Covid's Angels"	—	March 20, 2020	Premium episode #74
162	"Biden Time"	—	March 23, 2020	—
163	"Covid Corner"	—	March 27, 2020	Premium episode #75
164	"Quarantine Love Line"	—	March 30, 2020	—
165	"Social Distancing w/ Glenn Greenwald"	Glenn Greenwald	April 2, 2020	Premium episode #76, released for free on April 18, 2020
166	"War Room: Red Scare w/ Steve Bannon"	Steve Bannon	April 5, 2020	—
167	"Sincerely CV"	—	April 8, 2020	Premium episode #77
168	"Inside the Actresses Studio Apartment w/ Hari Nef"	Hari Nef	April 12, 2020	—
169	"Quar Brain"	—	April 16, 2020	Premium episode #78
170	"Inside Job w/ Yasha Levine"	Yasha Levine	April 23, 2020	Premium episode #79
171	"Quarny Police"	—	April 27, 2020	—
172	"TFW Podcast w/ Kantbot"	Kantbot	April 30, 2020	Premium episode #80
173	"Damned if You Jew, Damned if You Don't"	—	May 4, 2020	—
174	"Get Houelle Soon"	—	May 12, 2020	Premium episode #81
175	"Now More Than Ever"	—	May 17, 2020	—
176	"Oedipal Arrangements"	—	May 21, 2020	Premium episode #82
177	"Call Her Glamorous"	—	May 23, 2020	—
178	"Karens of the World Unite w/ Amber A'Lee Frost"	Amber A'Lee Frost	May 28, 2020	Premium episode #83, Amber's 6th episode
179	"A Crack-Up at the Race Riots"	—	June 1, 2020	—
180	"Blacked Out"	—	June 5, 2020	Premium episode #84
181	"Shame du Jour"	—	June 11, 2020	—
182	"Chaz Wendig"	—	June 15, 2020	Premium episode #85
183	"OK Groomer"	—	June 20, 2020	—
184	"Karen About the News"	—	June 26, 2020	Premium episode #86
185	"China Chalet Autonomous Zone"	—	July 3, 2020	—
186	"Movie Night: Little Vera/Hardcore"	—	July 11, 2020	Premium episode #87
187	"Kanye 2020"	—	July 13, 2020	—
188	"Art Broken"	—	July 19, 2020	Premium episode #88
189	"Burgirl Records"	—	July 27, 2020	—
190	"Summertime Fatness"	—	July 31, 2020	Premium episode #89
191	"Loveline Again"	—	August 6, 2020	—
192	"Wet Ass Political Pun"	—	August 14, 2020	Premium episode #90
193	"#FreeBannon"	—	August 21, 2020	—
194	"Come Get Your Manz"	—	August 27, 2020	Premium episode #91
195	"OnlySWERFS"	—	August 31, 2020	—
196	"Krug Life"	—	September 9, 2020	Premium episode #92
197	"Jewties"	—	September 16, 2020	—
198	"The Simp Life"	—	September 20, 2020	Premium episode #93
199	"Berkeley Brain"	—	September 24, 2020	—
200	"Bloomingdale's"	—	September 27, 2020	Premium episode #94
201	"Putin's Puppy"	—	October 1, 2020	—
202	"Cuckoo-19"	—	October 6, 2020	Premium episode #95
203	"Moss Hack w/ Paul Cupo"	Paul Cupo	October 11, 2020	Paul's 2nd episode
204	"A Dangerous Podcast"	—	October 13, 2020	Premium episode #96
205	"The Heart is a Lonely Hunter"	—	October 19, 2020	—
206	"Gone Toobin"	—	October 25, 2020	Premium episode #97
207	"Halloween Loveline"	—	October 28, 2020	—
208	"The Pervert's Guide to Podcasting"	Slavoj Žižek	October 31, 2020	Premium episode #98, released for free on November 25, 2020
209	"Ridenn with Glenn"	Glenn Greenwald	November 7, 2020	Glenn's 2nd episode
210	"Art Herstory"	—	November 12, 2020	Premium episode #99
211	"BOGOsian Special"	—	November 17, 2020	—
212	"No One Asked for The Great Reset"	—	November 21, 2020	Premium episode #100
213	"Hate Inc."	Matt Taibbi	November 27, 2020	Premium episode #101
214	"Children of the Porn"	—	December 7, 2020	—
215	"Pirates of the Autonomous Zone"	—	December 10, 2020	Premium episode #102
216	"Shia Labuse"	—	December 14, 2020	—
217	"Merry Catsmas w/ Cat Marnell"	Cat Marnell	December 24, 2020	Premium episode #103
218	"Propaganda w/ Mark Crispin Miller"	Mark Crispin Miller	December 26, 2020	—
219	"Hilaria Ensues"	—	December 31, 2020	Premium episode #104

2021 episodes

No.	Title	Guest(s)	Original release date	Notes
220	"Coupvid-19"	—	January 7, 2021	—
221	"Pretend It's a Podcast"	—	January 11, 2021	Premium episode #105
222	"Canceled Over the Country Club"	—	January 16, 2021	—
223	"A Promising Young Podcast"	—	January 24, 2021	Premium episode #106
224	"The Most Dangerous GME"	—	January 30, 2021	—
225	"Bimbo Summit"	—	February 8, 2021	Premium episode #107
226	"Valentine's Day Love Line"	—	February 13, 2021	—
227	"Can't Get You Out of My Head w/ Adam Curtis"	Adam Curtis	February 16, 2021	Premium episode #108, released for free on February 27, 2021
228	"Size 8½"	—	February 20, 2021	—
229	"Spermageddon"	—	February 24, 2021	Premium episode #109
230	"Ecce Cuomo"	—	March 2, 2021	Premium episode #110
231	"Pick Me Princess"	—	March 9, 2021	—
232	"Stop Eurasian Hate"	—	March 14, 2021	Premium episode #111
233	"Non Fungible Podcast w/ Dean Kissick"	Dean Kissick	March 18, 2021	—
234	"Manhattan Molestation Mystery"	—	March 23, 2021	Premium episode #112
235	"100 Boyfriends w/ Brontez Purnell"	Brontez Purnell	March 26, 2021	—
236	"Eurasian Baby Summer"	—	April 7, 2021	Premium episode #113
237	"Scamopticon"	—	April 19, 2021	—
238	"Where's Dan?"	Dan Allegretto	April 24, 2021	Premium episode #114, Dan's 7th episode
239	"Vaccination Victim"	—	May 1, 2021	—
240	"Cishet Intersectional Agency"	—	May 6, 2021	Premium episode #115
241	"Bruenig Derangement Syndrome"	—	May 13, 2021	—
242	"Mullholland Dimes"	—	May 20, 2021	Premium episode #116
243	"Themi Lovato"	—	May 24, 2021	—
244	"Shame Parade"	—	May 29, 2021	Premium episode #117
245	"Corona de Vil"	—	June 2, 2021	—
246	"What's Eating Gilbert Grimes"	—	June 7, 2021	Premium episode #118
247	"Stay Virgilant"	—	June 11, 2021	—
248	"Lindy Summit"	—	June 19, 2021	Premium episode #119
249	"Mumford & Cucks"	—	June 27, 2021	—
250	"The Cosby Trial Show"	—	July 8, 2021	Premium episode #120
251	"Cat Food People"	—	July 13, 2021	—
252	"Time for Another Love Line"	—	July 15, 2021	Premium episode #121
253	"Spa Wars"	—	July 22, 2021	—
254	"Wokestock 99"	—	July 28, 2021	Premium episode #122
255	"Da Broken Buck"	—	August 4, 2021	—
256	"Vibe Report"	—	August 10, 2021	Premium episode #123
257	"Taliban Mindset"	—	August 17, 2021	—
258	"Current Who Cares? w/ Glenn Greenwald"	Glenn Greenwald	August 23, 2021	Premium episode #124, Glenn's 3rd episode
259	"Donda Nekrasova"	—	September 6, 2021	—
260	"Brandy Hellville"	—	September 11, 2021	Premium episode #125
261	"Pod the Patriarchy"	—	September 17, 2021	—
262	"Property Sisters w/ Tim Dillon"	Tim Dillon	September 22, 2021	Premium episode #126
263	"Ocasio Crytez"	—	September 29, 2021	—
264	"Trad Art Friend"	—	October 11, 2021	Premium episode #127
265	"The Great R-Word"	—	October 18, 2021	—
266	"Red Scare LIVE w/ John Waters"	John Waters	October 22, 2021	Premium episode #128
267	"Bluecheck Bannisters"	—	October 29, 2021	—
268	"New Love Line"	—	November 6, 2021	Premium episode #129
269	"Autism University"	—	November 13, 2021	—
270	"Alex's War w/ Alex Jones and Alex Lee Moyer"	Alex Jones & Alex Lee Moyer	November 22, 2021	Premium episode #130
271	"Freddie de Bore"	—	December 1, 2021	—
272	"The Pervert's Guide to Podcasting, Pt. 2 w/ Slavoj Zizek"	Slavoj Žižek	December 9, 2021	Premium episode #131, Slavoj's 2nd episode

2022 episodes

No.	Title	Guest(s)	Original release date	Notes
273	"Sorry"	—	January 9, 2022	—
274	"Jailia Fox"	—	January 17, 2022	Premium episode #132
275	"FtM&M"	—	January 25, 2022	—
276	"The Anne Frank Experience"	—	January 31, 2022	Premium episode #133
277	"Whoopi Goldcube"	—	February 7, 2022	—
278	"Valentine's Day Loveline"	—	February 14, 2022	Premium episode #134
279	"Justin Trudon't Kill My Vibe"	—	February 21, 2022	—
280	"Skin in Ukraine w/ Simon Ostrovsky"	Simon Ostrovsky	February 26, 2022	Premium episode #135
281	"A Thiel as Old as Time"	—	March 5, 2022	—
282	"Podcast Bae"	Sean Thor Conroe	March 10, 2022	Premium episode #136
283	"#VaticanToo"	—	March 22, 2022	—
284	"The Pursuit of Slappyness"	—	April 1, 2022	Premium episode #137
285	"Locker Groom Talk"	—	April 11, 2022	—
286	"Poison Chill"	—	April 17, 2022	Premium episode #138
287	"Vanity Unfair"	—	April 25, 2022	—
288	"Abercrombie & Snitch"	—	May 3, 2022	Premium episode #139
289	"Handmaid's Fail"	—	May 10, 2022	—
290	"Pure Podcast w/ Sheila Heti"	Sheila Heti	May 16, 2022	Premium episode #140
291	"The Diary of Sam Frank w/ Sam Frank"	Sam Frank	May 21, 2022	—
292	"Monkeypuns"	—	May 29, 2022	Premium episode #141
293	"Summertime Loveline"	—	June 5, 2022	—
294	"The Lindy Effect w/ Paul Skallas"	Paul Skallas	June 13, 2022	Premium episode #142
295	"The Novelist w/ Jordan Castro"	Jordan Castro	June 19, 2022	—
296	"Bro v. Wade"	—	July 2, 2022	Premium episode #143
297	"Yarvin's Room w/ Curtis Yarvin"	Curtis Yarvin	July 4, 2022	—
298	"Viva Moz Vegas"	Nina Khachiyan & Eli Keszler	July 11, 2022	Premium episode #144
299	"Elon Bust"	—	July 19, 2022	—
300	"Welcome to the Longhouse"	—	July 29, 2022	Premium episode #145
301	"Anna For You"	—	August 7, 2022	—
302	"Yatagan Age Mindset w/ Jack Mason"	Jack Mason	August 15, 2022	Premium episode #146
303	"Ray Peasts"	—	August 20, 2022	—
304	"Mr. Gorbachev Start Up This Pod"	—	September 4, 2022	Premium episode #147
305	"Fashion Week w/ Paul Cupo"	Paul Cupo	September 13, 2022	Paul's 3rd episode
306	"Dunton Abbey w/ Eugene Kotlyarenko"	Eugene Kotlyarenko	September 21, 2022	Premium episode #148
307	"StopSlavicSlander"	—	September 30, 2022	—
308	"Doctor's Orders w/ Dr. Drew"	Dr. Drew	October 4, 2022	Premium episode #149
309	"Oy Ye!"	—	October 14, 2022	—
310	"The Wammin King"	—	October 19, 2022	Premium episode #150
311	"Anorexia Enormosa"	—	October 24, 2022	—
312	"Another Halloween Loveline"	—	November 1, 2022	Premium episode #151
313	"Agony of the Podcast w/ Logo Daedalus"	Logo Daedalus	November 7, 2022	—
314	"Effective Autism"	—	November 16, 2022	Premium episode #152
315	"Three Gay Guys Walk into Mar-a-Lago"	—	November 28, 2022	—
316	"Make America Great AgAnn w/ Ann Coulter"	Ann Coulter	December 3, 2022	Premium episode #153
317	"Bout That Life"	—	December 14, 2022	—
318	"The Twitter Files w/ Glenn Greenwald"	Glenn Greenwald	December 18, 2022	Premium episode #154, Glenn's 4th episode
319	"Nepo Baby it's Cold Outside"	—	December 25, 2022	—
320	"AIDS Lang Syne w/ Niccolo Soldo"	Niccolo Soldo	December 31, 2022	Premium episode #155

2023 episodes

No.	Title	Guest(s)	Original release date	Notes
321	"The Podsurrection"	—	January 7, 2023	—
322	"I Have a Nightmare"	—	January 17, 2023	Premium episode #156
323	"Incel Freakquinox"	—	January 25, 2023	—
324	"The Possibility of a Podcast w/ Michel Houellebecq"	Michel Houellebecq	February 1, 2023	Premium episode #157
325	"That Whole Yale Thing"	—	February 10, 2023	—
326	"Norwood Southern Railway"	—	February 17, 2023	Premium episode #158
327	"The Call is Coming from Inside the Longhouse"	—	February 24, 2023	—
328	"Hozempic"	—	March 10, 2023	Premium episode #159
329	"Silicon Valley Skanks"	—	March 17, 2023	—
330	"Bragg Hags"	—	March 25, 2023	Premium episode #160
331	"T Chat w/ Thomas Chatterton Williams"	Thomas Chatterton Williams	March 29, 2023	—
332	"Easter Loveline"	—	April 6, 2023	Premium episode #161
333	"Making Points w/ Saagar Enjeti"	Saagar Enjeti	April 14, 2023	—
334	"Like a Mid in a Candy Store"	—	April 22, 2023	Premium episode #162
335	"Feminism Against Progress w/ Mary Harrington"	Mary Harrington	April 26, 2023	—
336	"The Mid Gala w/ Elena Velez"	Elena Velez	May 5, 2023	Premium episode #163
337	"CNN Clown Hall"	—	May 13, 2023	—
338	"23andRazib w/ Razib Khan"	Razib Khan	May 21, 2023	Premium episode #164
339	"Shibuya Scramble"	—	June 1, 2023	—
340	"PERV Headquarters w/ Delicious Tacos"	Delicious Tacos	June 10, 2023	—
341	"World Class Zoomer"	—	June 22, 2023	Premium episode #165
342	"Clutching Pearlythingz"	—	July 9, 2023	—
343	"Initials GG w/ Glenn Greenwald"	Glenn Greenwald	July 17, 2023	Premium episode #166, Glenn's 5th episode
344	"Of Mids and Men"	—	July 28, 2023	—
345	"America's Cultural Revolution w/ Chris Rufo"	Christopher Rufo	August 1, 2023	Premium episode #167
346	"Ok Coupmer"	—	August 7, 2023	—
347	"Bronze Age Podcast w/ Bronze Age Pervert"	Bronze Age Pervert	August 14, 2023	Premium episode #168
348	"Simp on a Barbie"	—	August 22, 2023	—
349	"Civil of Ordeality"	—	September 1, 2023	Premium episode #169
350	"Back to School Loveline w/ Dan Allegretto"	Dan Allegretto	September 6, 2023	Dan's 8th episode
351	"Exiting the Haters Castle"	—	September 19, 2023	Premium episode #170
352	"Alarmed and Dangerous"	—	October 6, 2023	Premium episode #171
353	"You've Gaza be Kidding Me"	—	October 13, 2023	—
354	"Mentally Girarded"	—	October 23, 2023	Premium episode #172
355	"The Wolk Agenda w/ Ivy Wolk"	Ivy Wolk	November 3, 2023	—
356	"Coppola and Seethe"	—	November 10, 2023	Premium episode #173
357	"Crazy Autistic Asians w/ Tao Lin"	Tao Lin	November 20, 2023	—
358	"OpenGayGuy"	—	November 28, 2023	Premium episode #174
359	"I'll Be Missinger"	—	December 7, 2023	—
360	"Gay December"	—	December 18, 2023	Premium episode #175
361	"Burning Bridges w/ Brontez Purnell"	Brontez Purnell	December 27, 2023	Brontez's 2nd episode

2024 episodes

No.	Title	Guest(s)	Original release date	Notes
362	"Holiday Loveline"	—	January 2, 2024	—
363	"Don't Die w/ Bryan Johnson"	Bryan Johnson	January 11, 2024	Premium episode #176
364	"Did You Know That There's a Jewish Tunnel Under Eastern Pkwy"	—	January 20, 2024	—
365	"Dirtbag w/ Amber A'Lee Frost"	Amber A'Lee Frost	January 29, 2024	Premium episode #177, Amber's 7th episode
366	"Yemeni Such Cases"	—	February 7, 2024	—
367	"Russian Americans With Attitude w/ Russians With Attitude"	Kirill & Nikolay	February 23, 2024	Premium episode #178
368	"Emily Goon"	—	March 1, 2024	—
369	"Diddy Really Light Himself On Fire"	—	March 11, 2024	Premium episode #179
370	"Pod Things"	—	March 18, 2024	—
371	"The Doll Curve w/ Pariah the Doll"	Salomé	March 26, 2024	Premium episode #180
372	"The Hubermensch"	—	April 3, 2024	—
373	"Eclipse Loveline"	—	April 8, 2024	Premium episode #181
374	"Let's Go Brandy"	—	April 19, 2024	—
375	"The Lady Doth Protest Too Much"	—	April 27, 2024	Premium episode #182
376	"Sailer Socialism w/ Steve Sailer"	Steve Sailer	May 7, 2024	—
377	"Meth Gala w/ Paul Cupo"	Paul Cupo	May 15, 2024	Premium episode #183, Paul's 4th episode
378	"Mentally Challengeders"	—	May 28, 2024	—
379	"Trumped Up Charges"	—	June 6, 2024	Premium episode #184
380	"Summer Dress Sadness"	—	June 17, 2024	—
381	"Honor Roll w/ Honor Levy"	Honor Levy	June 26, 2024	Premium episode #185
382	"No Debate"	—	June 28, 2024	—
383	"Give Her a Hawking Tuah"	—	July 14, 2024	Premium episode #186
384	"Glennda does Red Scare w/ Glenn Belverio"	Glenn Belverio	July 17, 2024	—
385	"Tenacious Depot Lady"	—	July 25, 2024	Premium episode #187
386	"Borderline Czar"	—	August 3, 2024	—
387	"Maine Man w/ Tucker Carlson"	Tucker Carlson	August 5, 2024	Premium episode #188
388	"Hitting the Walz"	—	August 14, 2024	—
389	"Comments Section w/ Bruce Wagner"	Bruce Wagner	August 29, 2024	Premium episode #189
390	"Nanny Milkers"	—	September 7, 2024	—
391	"Haiters Gonna Hait"	—	September 16, 2024	Premium episode #190
392	"Let Me Loveline Again w/ Matthew Davis"	Matthew Davis	September 23, 2024	—
393	"The Nuzzler"	—	September 30, 2024	Premium episode #191
394	"Megaflopolis"	—	October 9, 2024	—
395	"The Subredditstance"	—	October 21, 2024	Premium episode #192
396	"Madison Square Garbage"	—	November 4, 2024	—
397	"The Bitch is Back"	—	November 13, 2024	Premium episode #193
398	"Fake and Gaetz"	—	November 21, 2024	—
399	"Thanksgiving Loveline"	—	November 28, 2024	Premium episode #194
400	"Call Him Brandon w/ Zoë Kestan"	Zoë Kestan	December 13, 2024	Zoë's 2nd episode
401	"Luigi's Haunted Mansion"	—	December 19, 2024	Premium episode #195
402	"Abundant Death"	—	December 26, 2024	—
403	"H1bppy New Year"	—	December 31, 2024	Premium episode #196

2025 episodes

No.	Title	Guest(s)	Original release date	Notes
404	"Groom Cave"	—	January 13, 2025	—
405	"Entering the Vampire Castle"	—	January 23, 2025	Premium episode #197
406	"The Bell Curve of the Ball"	—	January 31, 2025	—
407	"USAIDS"	—	February 11, 2025	Premium episode #198
408	"AidHate"	—	February 21, 2025	Premium episode #199
409	"Gender Euphoria"	—	March 2, 2025	Premium episode #200
410	"Annora"	—	March 10, 2025	—
411	"Stock Market"	—	March 19, 2025	Premium episode #201
412	"Tis the Sisson"	—	March 26, 2025	—
413	"Selfie Loathing"	—	April 2, 2025	Premium episode #202
414	"Dwork More Correct"	—	April 10, 2025	—
415	"Spacing Out"	—	April 22, 2025	Premium episode #203
416	"We Found Love in a Popeless Place"	—	April 30, 2025	—
417	"The Raped w/ Charls Carroll"	Charls & Effina Carroll	May 11, 2025	Premium episode #204
418	"Springtime Loveline w/ Dan Allegretto"	Dan Allegretto	May 20, 2025	Dan's 9th episode
419	"Whorevard University"	—	May 30, 2025	Premium episode #205
420	"Toe Math"	—	June 8, 2025	—
421	"Raece War"	—	June 17, 2025	Premium episode #206
422	"American Hate Story"	—	June 27, 2025	—
423	"Thiel it to the Judge"	—	July 2, 2025	Premium episode #207
424	"Grok of Shit"	—	July 11, 2025	—
425	"Savage X Fuenty"	—	July 21, 2025	Premium episode #208
426	"Poddington"	—	July 30, 2025	—
427	"HIB Positive"	—	August 8, 2025	Premium episode #209
428	"Ethel Cain't"	—	August 20, 2025	—
429	"Labubu Trap"	—	August 30, 2025	Premium episode #210
430	"Vax Scene"	—	September 10, 2025	—
431	"Je Suis Charlie"	—	September 17, 2025	Premium episode #211
432	"Jimmy Krimmenal"	—	September 24, 2025	—
433	"Podcast of Our Discontent w/ Thomas Chatterton Williams"	Thomas Chatterton Williams	October 4, 2025	Thomas' 2nd episode
434	"Fuentanyl OD w/ Nicholas J Fuentes"	Nick Fuentes	October 10, 2025	Premium episode #212
435	"Nyetwork"	—	October 21, 2025	—
436	"Ok Gooner"	—	October 28, 2025	Premium episode #213
437	"Only Haters w/ Sky Bri"	Sky Bri	October 31, 2025	—
438	"Mom Dommy"	—	November 11, 2025	Premium episode #214
439	"Nuzzi Salute"	—	November 21, 2025	—
440	"Trump's Delight"	—	November 26, 2025	Premium episode #215
441	"Jail Play"	—	December 9, 2025	—
442	"Brown Shooter"	—	December 17, 2025	Premium episode #216
443	"Holiday Loveline 2025"	—	December 22, 2025	—
444	"Bye Bye BB"	—	December 31, 2025	Premium episode #217

2026 episodes

No.	Title	Guest(s)	Original release date	Notes
445	"Martyr Supreme"	—	January 12, 2026	—
446	"Blow It Like Beckham"	—	January 27, 2026	Premium episode #218
447	"Goy Hard Or Goy Home"	—	February 3, 2026	—
448	"Slop-er Bowl"	—	February 11, 2026	Premium episode #219
449	"Smothering Heights"	—	February 18, 2026	—
450	"Stop Wasian Hate"	—	February 27, 2026	Premium episode #220
451	"Ayatoldya"	—	March 9, 2026	—
452	"United Clipfarm Workers"	—	March 20, 2026	Premium episode #221
453	"Austism w/ Eron Wolf and Razib Khan"	Eron Wolf & Razib Khan	March 24, 2026	Razib's 2nd episode
454	"Chappell Trap House"	—	March 30, 2026	Premium episode #222
455	"OpenAIGP"	—	April 8, 2026	—
456	"Eric Swolewell"	—	April 16, 2026	Premium episode #223
457	"Podsick"	—	April 25, 2026	—
458	"Shoplifters of the Third World"	—	May 2, 2026	Premium episode #224
459	"Met Gala Fashion Police w/ Elena Velez"	Elena Velez	May 6, 2026	Elena's 2nd episode
460	"Pratt Summer"	—	May 14, 2026	Premium episode #225
461	"Call Her Pregnant"	—	May 22, 2026	—
462	"Practices in Podcasting w/ Sigh Swoon"	Gabi Abrão	May 28, 2026	Premium episode #226, Gabi's 1st episode
463	"Slopsara"	—	June 3, 2026	—
464	"Pod Session"	—	June 12, 2026	Premium episode #227
465	"Pride Loveline"	—	June 19, 2026	—
466	"First Person Gooner"	—	June 27, 2026	Premium episode #228
467	"Sloppy Rooftoppy"	—	July 5, 2026	—
468	"The Podyssey"	—	July 26, 2026	Premium episode #229
469	"Nothing Left w/ Evan Barker"	Evan Barker	August 3, 2026	Evan's 1st episode
470	"Pray Arday Away"	—	August 10, 2026	Premium episode #230
471	"Slay the Baby Away"	—	August 19, 2026	—
472	"Dolly Departed"	—	August 29, 2026	Premium episode #231
473	"Steinem and Punishment"	—	September 8, 2026	—
474	"In the Mood for Clav"	Clavicular	September 14, 2026	Video-only episode
475	"Osydney Bin Laden"	—	September 21, 2026	Premium episode #232
476	"The Last Bitch"	—	September 29, 2026	—
477	"Whorenell University"	—	October 6, 2026	Premium episode #233
478	"Shane Doe"	—	October 15, 2026	—
479	"Women's Issues w/ Michael Tracey"	Michael Tracey	October 21, 2026	Premium episode #234, Michael's 2nd episode
480	"The Devils Advocate"	—	October 27, 2026	—
481	"Theranussy"	—	November 4, 2026	Premium episode #235
482	"Midterm ReBrand"	—	November 9, 2026	—
483	"Two Huangs Don't Make a Right"	—	November 17, 2026	Premium episode #236

== Reception and cultural impact ==
The hosts have been called "provocateurs", with a New York Times op-ed describing Red Scare in 2022 as a "louche hipster podcast" with no "coherent worldview" aside from a "contempt for social liberalism and a desire to épater la bourgeoisie [shock the middle class]". Initially associated with the dirtbag left and support for Bernie Sanders, after 2020 the podcast has been aligned with right-wing politics, and supported Donald Trump in the 2024 US presidential election. The hosts became disillusioned with both the political establishment and millennial leftist figures for ostensibly prioritizing identity politics over class. The American Mind identified the 2020 George Floyd protests as a turning point in which the podcast shifted from "left-critical" reference points like Christopher Lasch and Glenn Greenwald towards right-wing figures such as Bronze Age Pervert, Curtis Yarvin and "race realist" Steve Sailer. In March 2023, the hosts appeared with Roger Stone at a New York Young Republican Club event coordinated by Lucian Wintrich. In 2025, Nekrasova described Red Scare as influencing a "reactionary sentiment amongst Manhattanites", within a wider move towards Trump in 2024, and Khachiyan said: "We've always loved [Trump], even when we had to be down-low brothers about it." Nekrasova, a practicing Catholic who has expressed sedevacantist views, has been credited for trending Catholicism in certain demographics of millennials and Gen Z. Critics have accused Red Scare of being overly ironic and amoral, and of breeding cynicism and nihilism.

In 2018, Red Scare was described in The Cut as "a critique of feminism, and capitalism, from deep inside the culture they've spawned." The hosts' critique of feminism has been influenced by Camille Paglia, and they have often quoted lines from her books, such as "if civilization had been left in female hands, we would still be living in grass huts" and "there is no female Mozart because there is no female Jack the Ripper". The podcast makes frequent use of the word "retard", and has been described as trying to re-popularize the slur. In 2022, conservative filmmaker Amanda Milius described Red Scare's laissez-faire attitude as a "premier example" of the "live-and-let-live place" occupied by the "new right". Writing in The American Conservative, Stephen G. Adubato credited the hosts for recognizing the pre-political ("aesthetics, psychology and metaphysics") as a prerequisite for understanding politics. In 2019, Jezebel criticized the podcast as "emblematic of a certain kind of disaffected, supposedly leftist voice that's casually full of breathtaking cruelty", including promotion of anorexia.

In 2022, Khachiyan met with billionaire venture capitalist Peter Thiel and U.S. Senate candidate Blake Masters. Masters, until then president of the Thiel Foundation, called Red Scare "interesting", and hinted to Vanity Fair that it could receive funding from Thiel in the future. Nekrasova and Khachiyan denied receiving any funding from Thiel.

The podcast generated controversy for hosting white nationalist commentator Nick Fuentes in October 2025. Fuentes, who is known for his sexist and antisemitic rhetoric, made offensive remarks about ethnic and religious groups during the interview, with Nekrasova telling Fuentes that she was "such a fan, honestly". Nekrasova was subsequently dropped by the talent agency Gersh, and was also fired from her role in the upcoming film Iconoclast.

=== Popular culture ===
Between 2019 and 2022, Audrey Gelman, Lena Dunham, Chloë Sevigny, Cazzie David, Leah McSweeney, Jonah Hill, Rachel Comey and Elizabeth Olsen mentioned listening to the show in interviews. Gelman's husband, Genius co-founder Ilan Zechory, was a co-host on Red Scare Roundup, a podcast that recapped episodes of the show from May to November 2018.

In 2021, Sydney Sweeney confirmed that Red Scare was the inspiration for the characters she and Brittany O'Grady played in the HBO satirical drama series The White Lotus, created by Mike White. White instructed Sweeney to listen to the podcast and base her performance on the hosts' specific vocal intonations. The Charli XCX song "Mean Girls", on her 2024 album Brat, was inspired by Nekrasova, with the singer telling Rolling Stone: "I wouldn't say I'm deeply invested in edgelord culture, but have I scanned the texts? Sure." In the pilot episode of the FX show English Teacher, Brian Jordan Alvarez's ex-boyfriend (played by Jordan Firstman) describes himself as "basically a conservative at this point", before saying "I don't even know what I am anymore. I listen to Red Scare."
