= Dimes (restaurant) =

American restaurant

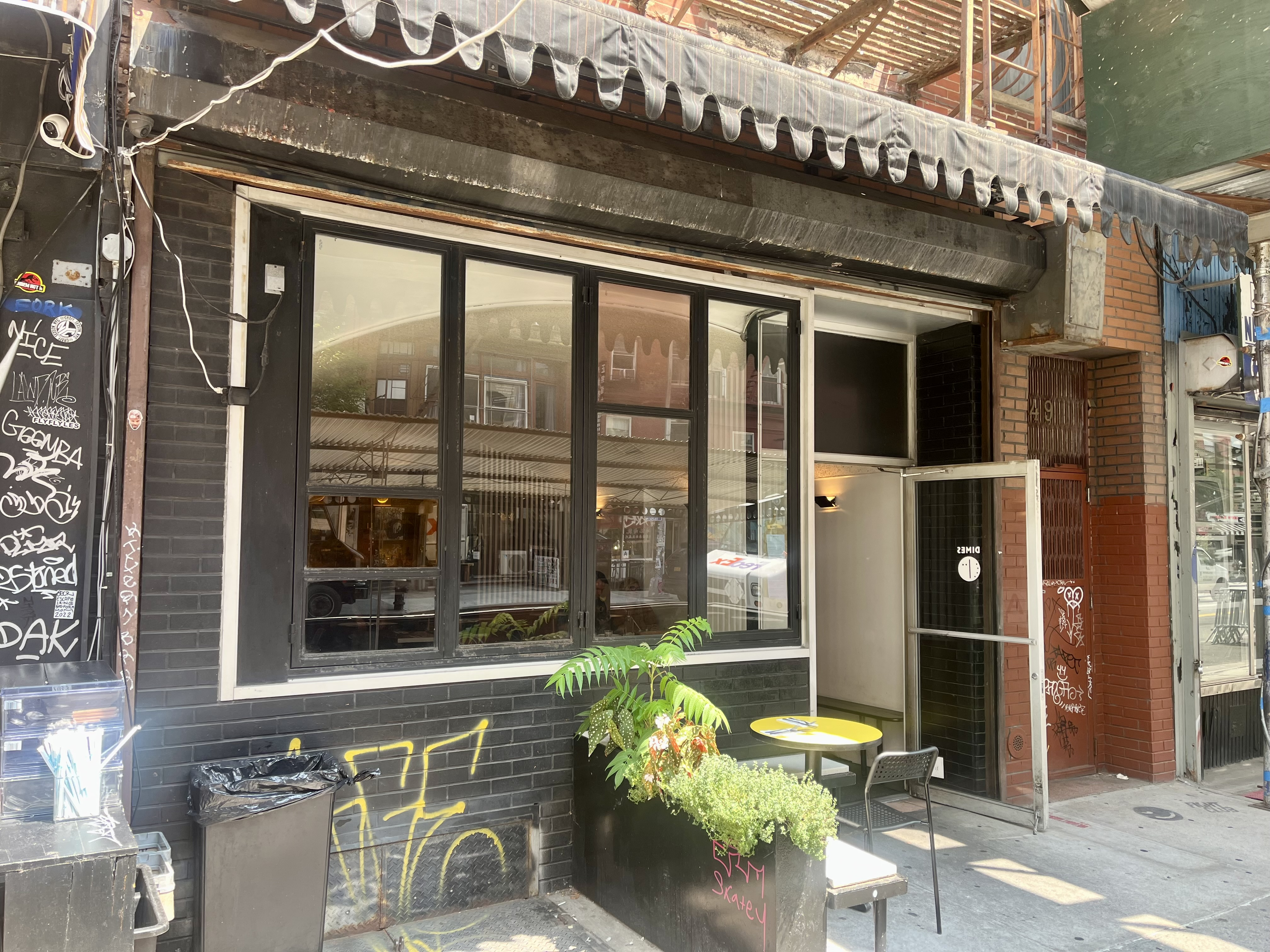
- The restaurant's exterior in 2024
- Interactive map of Dimes

Restaurant information
- Established: 2013
- Owners: Alissa Wagner and Sabrina DeSousa
- Location: New York
- Coordinates: 40°42′53.9″N 73°59′29.6″W
- Website: dimesnyc.com

Dimes is a restaurant on the Lower East Side of Manhattan in New York City. Alissa Wagner and Sabrina DeSousa founded it in 2013. There are also an associated deli, Dimes Deli, and a store, Dimes Market, in the same neighborhood.

== History ==
The restaurant's founders, Alissa Wagner and Sabrina DeSousa, met while both employed at the restaurant Lovely Day, in the Nolita neighborhood. Both lived near Dimes's original location, and sensed "a hole" in the neighborhood that they sought to fill with their restaurant. DeSousa has also said that their original ambition was to "have a place where we could hang out with our friends." The pair was also inspired by frequent trips to Whole Foods, the only place near their apartments "for us to get a healthy and delicious meal."

The restaurant first opened a 20-seat location on Division Street, but moved and reopened in 2015 to a larger location 299 feet away on Canal Street. Upon reopening, the restaurant began serving alcohol and an expanded dinner menu. The original location is now Dimes Deli, which opened in September 2015. Dimes Deli serves takeout and a limited menu including salads, sandwiches, and bowls. Dimes Deli is next to Dimes Market. Although ostensibly a grocery store, Dimes Market also sells ceramics, books, and other household items.

The restaurant published its first cookbook in 2020.

=== Clientele and influence ===
Shauna Lyon, writing for The New Yorker, referred to Dimes's clientele as "cool kids". Wagner has said the restaurant is popular with members of the fashion industry and the art world. The presence of several Dimes-brand storefronts and its association with the surrounding portion of Chinatown has led to the area around the restaurant being called "Dimes Square". This nickname has been popularised by Dasha Nekrasova and Anna Khachiyan on their podcast, Red Scare.

The restaurant has also been credited with pioneering what The New York Times has called the “all-day café”. Other examples include Res Ipsa in Philadelphia and June’s All Day in Austin.

== Reception ==
Reviews have noted that the restaurant fosters an atmosphere hostile to non-regulars. New York Magazine called it "cliquish". Chris Stang, writing for The Infatuation, wrote that the restaurant was "uncomfortable due to the cold service" but that the food was "very good".
