= Gasda =

Gasda is a surname. Notable people with the surname include:

- Matthew Gasda (born 1989), American playwright, author and essayist
- Sarah Gasda, American civil and environmental engineering researcher in Norway
