= Dimes Square =

New York City microneighborhood and Internet art scene

- Microneighborhood
- Etymology: Dimes restaurant
- Interactive map of Dimes Square
- Location in Manhattan Location in New York City
- Coordinates: 40°42′53.9″N 73°59′29.6″W
- Country: United States
- State: New York
- City: New York City
- Borough: Manhattan
- Community district: Manhattan Community Board 3
- Time zone: UTC−05:00 (Eastern (EST))
  - Summer (DST): UTC−04:00 (EDT)
- ZIP codes: 10002; 10013
- Area codes: 212, 332 and 646; 917

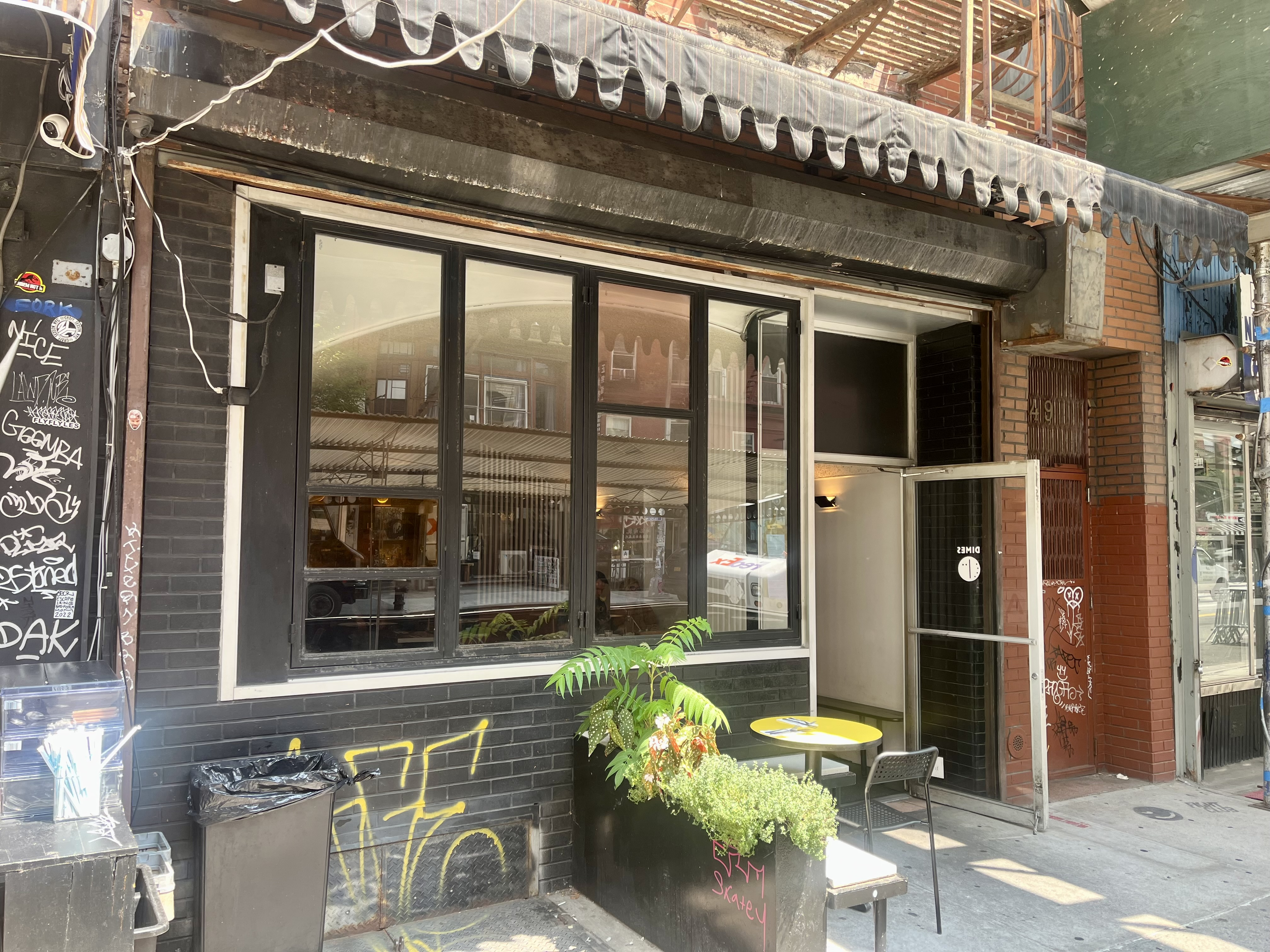
The restaurant Dimes, the neighborhood's namesake

Dimes Square is the name given to an area of Manhattan consisting of five square blocks located in the Chinatown and Lower East Side neighborhoods and its associated art scene. The exact perimeter and nature of Dimes Square is debated, though survey data from The New York Times lists it as roughly the five blocks on either side of Canal Street between Allen Street and Essex Street.

== Etymology ==
The neighborhood's name, a play on "Times Square", refers to Dimes, a restaurant located at the intersection of Canal Street and Division Street on the Lower East Side. According to Marisa Meltzer of The New York Times, the nickname has transitioned from a term used "jokingly" to one used "semi-seriously". The term Dimes Square became a metonym for a number of associated reactionary aesthetic movements centered in the area. It was originally popularized by Dasha Nekrasova and Anna Khachiyan of the podcast Red Scare who stemmed from the dirtbag left movement.

== History ==
In 2020, two blocks of Canal Street were closed off for an Open Streets permit, resulting in what Hannah Goldfield of The New Yorker described as a "circus", "every night a music festival in the piazza." Ben Smith cited the neighborhood's emergence as a lockdown-flouting cultural hub during the COVID-19 pandemic in a 2021 New York Times piece. As COVID-19 restrictions receded, the associated transgressive art movement digitized and became increasingly prominent in online culture.

In 2024, Dazed magazine referred to Dimes Square as a meme-able micro-neighborhood. The American pop rock band Bleachers referenced Dimes Square in their 2024 song "Jesus Is Dead".

Following the June 2026 seizure of KiKi's, a Dimes Square restaurant, for failure to pay taxes, neighborhood regulars began debating whether the Dimes Square scene was ending.

== Art scene ==
In 2022, Julia Yost argued in a The New York Times op-ed that the neighborhood and its associated podcasters such as Dasha Nekrasova of Red Scare were the center of a post-ironic revival of traditionalist Catholicism. According to Nick Dove in Vice, scene participants "ranged from anti-identitarian leftism to outright fascism, a motley crew of outside dissenters to then-ascendant hyper-liberalism".

Media associated with the area include the podcast Red Scare, pirate radio station Montez Press Radio, and defunct print newspaper The Drunken Canal. An online Dimes zine named Byline was established in 2023 by Gutes Guterman and Megan O'Sullivan. In 2023, the NME cited several musicians associated with Dimes Square as "reinvigorating NYC's music scene", including The Dare, The Hellp, Been Stellar, Frost Children, Hello Mary, Model/Actriz, and Strange Ranger.

Operating between 2022 and 2025, Sovereign House was a cultural events venue associated with the scene, owned by fintech co-founder Nick Allen. In 2024, Magdalene Taylor described it in GQ as the "last bastion" of Dimes Square, and City Journal described it in 2025 as "New York's premier right-wing gathering spot". According to The New Yorker, its speakers were "heterodox, and sometimes controversial". It hosted events including an Elena Velez presentation, a play by Matthew Gasda, a DOGE appreciation party, and events for publications such as The Point and Heavy Traffic. Guest speakers included Benjamin R. Teitelbaum, Norman Finkelstein, and far-right figures such as Curtis Yarvin, Raw Egg Nationalist, and Steve Sailer, a proponent of scientific racism. Sovereign House closed after its lease expired in Spring 2025.

Matthew Gasda's 2026 play The Last Days of Downtown was described in Vice as a "post-mortem" for the Dimes Square scene. According to Ross Barkan, Zohran Mamdani's election as Mayor of New York City in 2025 marked a change in political mood contributing to the decline of Dimes Square.

== Notable people ==
- Betsey Brown, actress and director
- Blaketheman1000, pop/indie artist and producer
- Madeline Cash, author and co-founder of Forever Magazine
- Jordan Castro, writer and editor
- The Dare, singer, DJ, and music producer
- Anna Khachiyan, cultural critic, writer, and co-host of the Red Scare podcast
- Honor Levy, author
- Dasha Nekrasova, actress, filmmaker, and co-host of the Red Scare podcast
- Peter Vack, actor, writer, and filmmaker
- Sean Price Williams, cinematographer and film director
- Elena Velez, fashion designer
- Victoria Campbell, artist and critic

== See also ==
- Frogtwitter
- Dirtbag left
- Post-Internet
- Metrograph
