= Colyar =

Colyar is a surname. Notable people with the surname include:

- Arthur St. Clair Colyar (1818–1907), American lawyer, Confederate politician, and newspaper editor
- Brock Colyar, American journalist
- Michael Colyar (born 1957), American actor, comedian, voiceover artist, and author
