= Honor Levy =

American author

- Born: December 21, 1997 (age 28)
- Education: Bennington College
- Occupation: Author

Honor Levy (born December 21, 1997) is an American author. Her first book, My First Book, was published by Penguin Random House on May 14, 2024.

== Early life and education ==
Levy grew up in Silver Lake, Los Angeles. Her father is a director and her mother is a professional make-up artist. She attended a French-immersion high school and Rock and Roll Camp for Girls in the summer. Afterwards, Levy attended Bennington College, graduating in 2020. She briefly resided in New York City until November 2023, when she moved back to Los Angeles. She is ethnically Jewish.

== Career ==
Levy began writing when she was 14 years old; her first published piece is available as a monologue posted to YouTube.

Shortly before her graduation in May 2020, Levy's short story "Cancel Me" was published by Tyrant Books, and The New Yorker published her flash fiction "Good Boys" in July of the same year.

Levy has since been associated with Dimes Square, a Manhattan-based "microneighborhood" and subculture noted for its reactionary political leanings and aesthetics. In June 2024, she appeared on the podcast Red Scare, whose hosts, Anna Khachiyan and Dasha Nekrasova, are closely affiliated with Dimes Square. Levy herself hosted the podcast Wet Brain alongside Walter Pearce, before an indefinite hiatus was announced in 2022.

Levy's first book, My First Book, is a collection of short stories published in May 2024. My First Book received a critical but generally positive review from Dwight Garner of The New York Times, and was noted for its chronically online prose and commentary on popular and internet culture.
