= Brock Colyar =

American writer

- Born: United States
- Occupations: Journalist, writer

Brock Colyar is a journalist who was born in Tennessee. They are a features writer at New York magazine. They have been the writer of The Cut's nightlife newsletter "are u coming?" since 2021.

In 2023, Colyar was awarded an American Society of Magazine Editors NEXT Award for Journalists Under 30. In 2025, they were a Forbes 30 Under 30 recipient.

== Early life and education ==
Colyar studied gender and sexuality studies and journalism at Northwestern University, starting an LGBTQ magazine Queer Reader in their sophomore year. They identify as non-binary or enby and use they/them pronouns. Colyar subsequently worked as an editorial intern for Ms.

== Career ==
Colyar has interviewed cultural figures such as Charli XCX, Vivian Wilson, Bethenny Frankel, Alex Cooper, Dylan Mulvaney, Sara Ramirez, Ocean Vuong, and Sarah McBride. They have also profiled notable New Yorkers such as Candace Bushnell, Bowen Yang, Honor Levy, Caroline Calloway, Dasha Nekrasova, the Dare, and Susanne Bartsch.

In January 2025, Colyar's New York magazine cover story "The Cruel Kids' Table" about young conservative Americans and Colyar's experiences at a 2024 President Donald Trump re-election party resulted in a conservative backlash from Trump influencer and conservative activist CJ Pearson, who threatened to sue New York magazine because of the story. New York defended the article, saying, “We believe both the cover and story provide an accurate impression of the weekend.”

Colyar's May 2025 New York magazine cover story "It Must Be Nice to Be a West Village Girl" about young women in the West Village neighborhood of New York City inspired an independent short film by Julia DiCesar.
