= The Scary of Sixty-First =

2021 film by Dasha Nekrasova

- Theatrical release poster
- Directed by: Dasha Nekrasova
- Written by: Dasha Nekrasova; Madeline Quinn
- Produced by: Adam Mitchell; Mark Rapaport
- Starring: Betsey Brown; Madeline Quinn; Dasha Nekrasova
- Cinematography: Hunter Zimny
- Edited by: Sophie Corra
- Music by: Eli Keszler
- Production companies: Carnegie Hill Entertainment; Kinematics; Spacemaker Productions
- Distributed by: Utopia
- Release dates: March 1, 2021 (Berlin); December 3, 2021 (United States)
- Running time: 81 minutes
- Country: United States
- Language: English
- Box office: $56,281

The Scary of Sixty-First is a 2021 American horror thriller exploitation film directed by Dasha Nekrasova (in her feature directorial debut), who co-wrote the screenplay with Madeline Quinn. It stars Betsey Brown, Quinn, and Dasha Nekrasova.

The film had its world premiere in the Encounters section of the 71st Berlin International Film Festival, where it won the Best First Feature Award. In May 2021, distribution rights were acquired by distributor Utopia and streaming service Shudder. It opened in theaters in Los Angeles on December 3, 2021, and in New York City on December 17, followed by a VOD release on December 24.

== Plot ==
Noelle and Addie are young adults who are viewing an apartment on the Upper East Side of Manhattan. Despite peculiar elements of the apartment, including abandoned furnishings and a suspicious realtor, the two move in. On their first evening there, Noelle finds a tarot card of The Sun, the only card displaying naked children. Addie is plagued by nightmares.

A mysterious girl shows up at the apartment, having previously been spotted by Noelle and Addie looking inside from the street. Initially posing as a realtor, she reveals that she is there to investigate notorious sex trafficker Jeffrey Epstein. She believes that the apartment was previously owned by Epstein, and suggests that crimes, including child prostitution and murder, may have taken place there. Noelle and the girl begin to obsessively research conspiracy theories surrounding Epstein's death and his alleged activities, and eventually begin a romantic relationship.

Meanwhile, Addie becomes psychologically disturbed, seemingly as a result of living in the apartment. She wanders the streets of Manhattan in a daze. During sex with her boyfriend Greg, she asks him to pretend they are on Epstein's Lolita Express private jet, and engages in ageplay, demanding Greg to treat her like she is 13 years old in a voice that is not her own; she has no memory of the events immediately afterward. She also masturbates to images of Prince Andrew, who was an associate of Epstein's, while dressing and behaving childishly.

Noelle and the girl's research reveals two other Epstein properties five blocks away from the apartment on either side; Noelle suggests a connection to the pentagram. The girl reveals that she also found a tarot card, this one in Addie's bedroom. The two visit a "magical apothecary" to discover the meaning behind the cards, whose owner warns them to leave the apartment immediately and gives them an obsidian crystal for protection. They return to the apartment to find Addie, still seemingly entranced and sexually obsessed with Prince Andrew. Noelle and the girl visit the Metropolitan Correctional Center where Epstein died, only to find Addie there, dressed similarly to a young girl pictured in a photo with Epstein. The two meet Greg at his work and learn the story of the bizarre sexual encounter between him and Addie.

The girl suggests that Addie is a victim of CIA mind control experiments, similar to Project MKUltra. Describing Addie as a "liability", the girl implies that she should be killed, which Noelle angrily refuses. The girl returns to the apartment to find the door chained shut, and evidence of Addie's masturbatory activities. She flees to the apartment's basement to find Addie before a large poster of The Sun tarot card, which includes depictions of nude children. When she discovers the girl's presence, Addie knocks her unconscious and begins to abuse her physically and sexually. She is interrupted by the arrival of Noelle, who kills her by stabbing her repeatedly with a knife. She returns to the apartment to meet the realtor who first showed them the apartment; their conversation implies that Addie's death was a planned part of a Satanic ritual.

The girl regains consciousness and finds Noelle in the apartment. Noelle attacks her and attempts to kill her, but the girl fights back, bashing Noelle's skull with the obsidian crystal. She rushes to Greg's workplace, but when the two return together, the apartment and the basement are empty and clean, with no bodies or evidence of a struggle. Greg leaves angrily. The girl returns to the apartment to find an anonymous note, telling her that the events she experienced are a warning for her to give up her investigations.

== Cast ==
- Betsey Brown as Addie
- Madeline Quinn as Noelle
- Dasha Nekrasova as the girl
- Stephen Gurewitz as the realtor
- Mark Rapaport as Greg
- Aaron Dalla Villa as crystal shop customer
- Jason Grisell as apothecary clerk
- Anna Khachiyan as Ghislaine Maxwell doppelgänger
- Michael M. Bilandic as Greg's boss
- Ruby McCollister as mailroom girl

== Critical reception ==
On the review aggregator website Rotten Tomatoes, the film holds an approval rating of 55% based on 42 reviews, with an average rating of 5.5/10. The website's critics consensus reads, "It's hard not to admire its often ungainly attempts to achieve its ambitions, but The Scary of Sixty-First is a horror provocation that disappoints as often as it thrills." Metacritic, which uses a weighted average, assigned the film a score of 48 out of 100, based on 11 critics, indicating "mixed or average" reviews.

Christian Blauvelt of IndieWire praised the film as "thrilling and unforgettable", drawing comparisons to Eyes Wide Shut (1999), 1970s thrillers and the works of Roman Polanski.
