= Zoë Kestan =

American designer

- Born: c. 1993 (age 32–33); New York City, U.S.
- Other name: Zoe Kestan
- Education: Rhode Island School of Design (BFA)
- Occupations: Designer; former social media figure

Zoë Kestan (born c. 1993) is an American designer and former social media figure based in New York City. She gained public attention for her work in fashion and testimony related to her past relationship with Hunter Biden, which was the subject of federal investigations and legal proceedings.

== Early life and education ==
Zoë Kestan was born and raised in the Yorkville section of Manhattan. She is the daughter of a lawyer and a saleswoman. Her stepfather worked in the garment industry. Kestan attended the Horace Mann School. She studied art and design at the Rhode Island School of Design (RISD), where she earned a BFA in 2014.

== Career ==
After graduating from RISD, Kestan returned to New York City and began working as a color mixer for artist Jeff Koons. Concurrently, she became active in Manhattan's nightlife scene, attending events at venues such as the Boom Boom Room and China Chalet.

In 2013, Kestan developed a following on Instagram, where she shared a combination of personal photographs and visual content inspired by her interests in art and fashion. Her online presence led to collaborations with designers and brands, including Telfar Clemens and Andre Richardson, the publisher of a magazine and streetwear label. She participated in Richardson’s events as a performer and was also featured in his publication.

In 2017, Kestan introduced a New York City-based lingerie and apparel line called WeedSlut, which combined themes of fashion, cannabis culture, and the aesthetics of sex work. The collection debuted at a New York City cocktail lounge. She later worked as a designer for the advertising agency Wieden+Kennedy. In 2022, Kestan shifted her focus to home décor design and took on the role of studio assistant for decorative artist Elizabeth Hayt. She has since resumed participation in the creative community, including attending gallery events and collaborating on artistic projects.

In the mid-2020s, Kestan resumed work on WeedSlut including a line of lingerie, t-shirts, and a mesh baby doll dress. Since 2025, she has done custom commissions for singers Addison Rae, Adéla, and Ella Langley.

== Personal life ==
Kestan met businessman and lobbyist Hunter Biden in December 2017 while working as a dancer at Vivid Cabaret, a strip club in New York City. This meeting marked the beginning of an 11-month relationship, during which they frequently stayed in luxury hotels in New York and Los Angeles. During this time, Kestan witnessed Biden's struggles with substance use, including his crack cocaine addiction.

The relationship ended in late 2018. In the following years, Kestan provided testimony, under immunity, in legal proceedings involving Biden, including his federal trial, where her statements addressed his drug use and financial activities.

Kestan has publicly discussed the lasting impact of her relationship with Biden, noting the challenges it created for her personal and professional life. She has expressed a desire to move forward and reestablish herself outside the context of her past association with Biden.
