= All-day café =

Type of restaurant

An all-day café is a dining establishment that generally serves distinct menus for breakfast, lunch, and dinner, switching from a casual, work-friendly atmosphere for breakfast and lunch to a more formal menu and setting in the evening. The restaurants remain open between courses, offering drinks including coffee, and food including pastries and small plates. All-day cafés tend to serve health-conscious menus, with an emphasis on vegetables. Several founders of all-day establishments have expressed a desire to provide a communal "third place" where, for instance, freelancers would feel comfortable.

Examples include Dimes and Gertie in New York City, Res Ipsa in Philadelphia, and Fellows Cafe in Atlanta. This type of restaurant is said to have originated in Australian "coffee bars", which were imported to California by Australian expatriates.
