= Res Ipsa (restaurant) =

Restaurant and cafe in Philadelphia

Res Ipsa Cafe
- Interactive map of Res Ipsa Cafe

Restaurant information
- Owners: Mark Corpus; Mark Capriotti; Tyler Akin
- Location: Philadelphia, PA, 19103, United States
- Coordinates: 39.9509°N 75.1784°W

Res Ipsa Cafe was a restaurant and café located in the Rittenhouse Square neighborhood of Philadelphia. It was a collaboration between the owners of Philadelphia cafe chain ReAnimator Coffee and Tyler Akin, a chef and the owner of Philadelphia restaurant Stock.

During the day, Res Ipsa Cafe served coffee and light food, but after 5:30 served a dinner menu with primarily Sicilian-inspired dishes.

== History ==
Res Ipsa's storefront was previously occupied by the kitchen of an adjacent restaurant. When the owners of ReAnimator Coffee. Mark Corpus and Mark Capriotti, were shown the space by a broker, they determined a coffee shop would not produce enough income to justify the rent. They contacted the owner and chef of Philadelphia restaurant Stock to work with them to produce substantial dinner menus to serve in the evening. Construction to turn the storefront into a functional restaurant began in 2016, and the restaurant opened later that year. The restaurant was an “all-day [café]” similar to Dimes in New York City, switching from casual fare during the day to a more formal dinner menu and atmosphere at night.

The restaurant was adversely impacted by the COVID-19 pandemic. It did not have the capacity to add outdoor seating, and its pasta did not travel well, meaning it could not make up lost in-person income with money from deliveries. Ultimately, the restaurant closed due to the pandemic. The restaurant was replaced by a location of the bakery Lost Bread Co. After the closure, Michael Vincent Ferreri, the restaurant's former executive chef, reopened South Philadelphia restaurant Irwin's. The reopened Irwin's has been referred to as "a resurrection of Res Ipsa".

The restaurant's name came from an abbreviation of the Latin res ipsa loquitur, meaning "the thing speaks for itself".

=== Lawsuit ===
The restaurant was sued in August 2017 by Res Ipsa, an Atlanta-based clothing and accessories company, for trademark infringement. The similarity in name led to the Atlanta company accidentally receiving praise for sandwiches it did not serve on social media. After formally switching the name of the restaurant to "Res Ipsa Cafe" the case was dismissed.

== Food and aesthetic ==
During the day, Res Ipsa Cafe served ReAnimator coffee, and a simple breakfast menu including sandwiches and yogurt parfait. The Sicilian dinner menu was primarily seafood and pasta-focused. Michael Vincent Ferreri, the executive chef, drew from his professional experience at Italian restaurant Zeppoli and from his family's history — his great-grandparents emigrated from Sicily to the United States — to create the menu. The dinner menu was served only Wednesday through Sunday, but the cafe was open seven days a week. The restaurant received praise for its salads. As is typical for restaurants in Philadelphia, the restaurant was BYOB.

The restaurant's agrodolce chicken was inspired by Ferreri's upbringing in Rochester and cooking Sicilian recipes with relatives. Bon Appétit included the restaurant on its 2017 list of the best restaurants in the United States. Alex Delany, of Bon Appétit, recommended ordering multiple half-portions of the pasta to would-be patrons.

== Reception ==
Jason Sheehan, writing for Philadelphia Magazine, gave the restaurant three out of four stars, in part to prevent the restaurant from being overwhelmed by "...a flood of tourists or culinary day-trippers". Condé Nast Traveler said Res Ipsa offers a "nice respite from the bustle of Center City". A review from The Infatuation praised the quality and variety of pasta.

Several publications highlighted the restaurant's breakfast sandwich.
