= Sarah Gasda =

American civil and environmental engineer

Sarah Eileen Gasda is an American civil engineer and environmental engineering whose research concerns multiphase flow in porous media and its applications in modeling geological carbon sequestration. She works in Norway as Research Director for Computational Geosciences and Modelling at NORCE Research, holds a faculty position at the University of Bergen as professor II in the Department of Physics and Technology, and directs the Centre for Sustainable Subsurface Resources, a joint program of NORCE and the University of Bergen.

== Education and career ==
Gasda joined Princeton University in 2001, as a master's student of Michael A. Celia. She continued at Princeton for a Ph.D., completed in 2008, in civil and environmental engineering. Her doctoral dissertation, Numerical models for evaluating carbon dioxide storage in deep, saline aquifers: Leaky wells and large-scale geological features, was supervised by Celia.

She became a postdoctoral researcher in the Department of Environmental Science and Engineering at the University of North Carolina at Chapel Hill, and then in 2011 moved to Norway to join NORCE. She was promoted to chief scientist at NORCE in 2018.

== Recognition ==
Gasda is a member of the Norwegian Academy of Technological Sciences (NTVA).
