= China Chalet =

Former restaurant and event venue in New York City

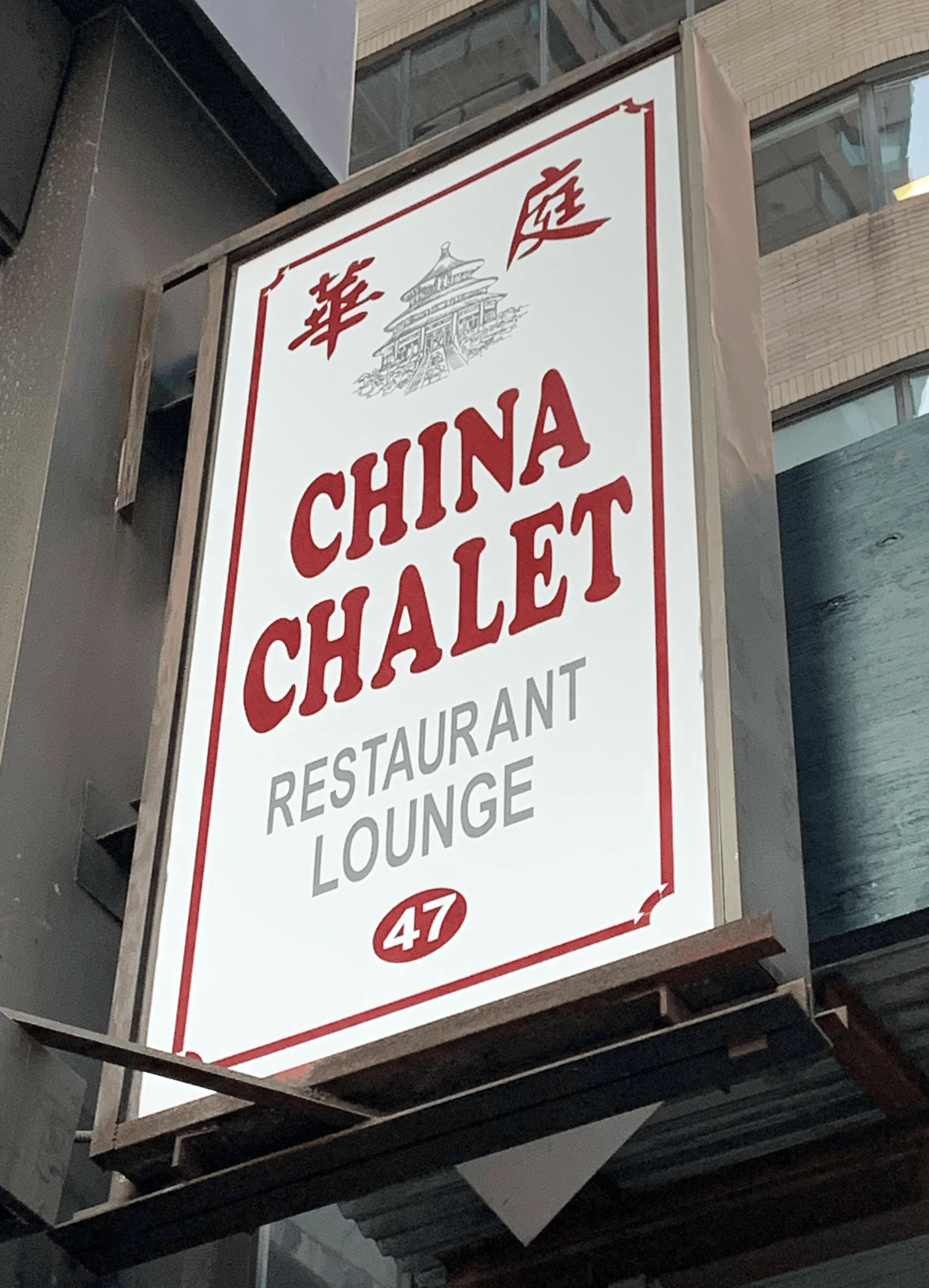
- Signage for China Chalet
- Interactive map of China Chalet

Restaurant information
- Established: 1975
- Closed: 2020
- Previous owner: Keith Ng
- Location: 47 Broadway, Manhattan, New York City, NY, U.S., New York City, New York, 10006, United States
- Coordinates: 40°42′23.7″N 74°0′46.7″W

China Chalet was a Chinese restaurant located in the Financial District of New York City. Opened in 1975, the restaurant operated as a luxury dim sum banquet hall catering to a business clientele. Beginning in the 2000s, China Chalet contemporaneously operated as a rental space for nightlife events, alternately serving as an event space, nightclub, and concert venue. China Chalet permanently closed in 2020.

== History ==
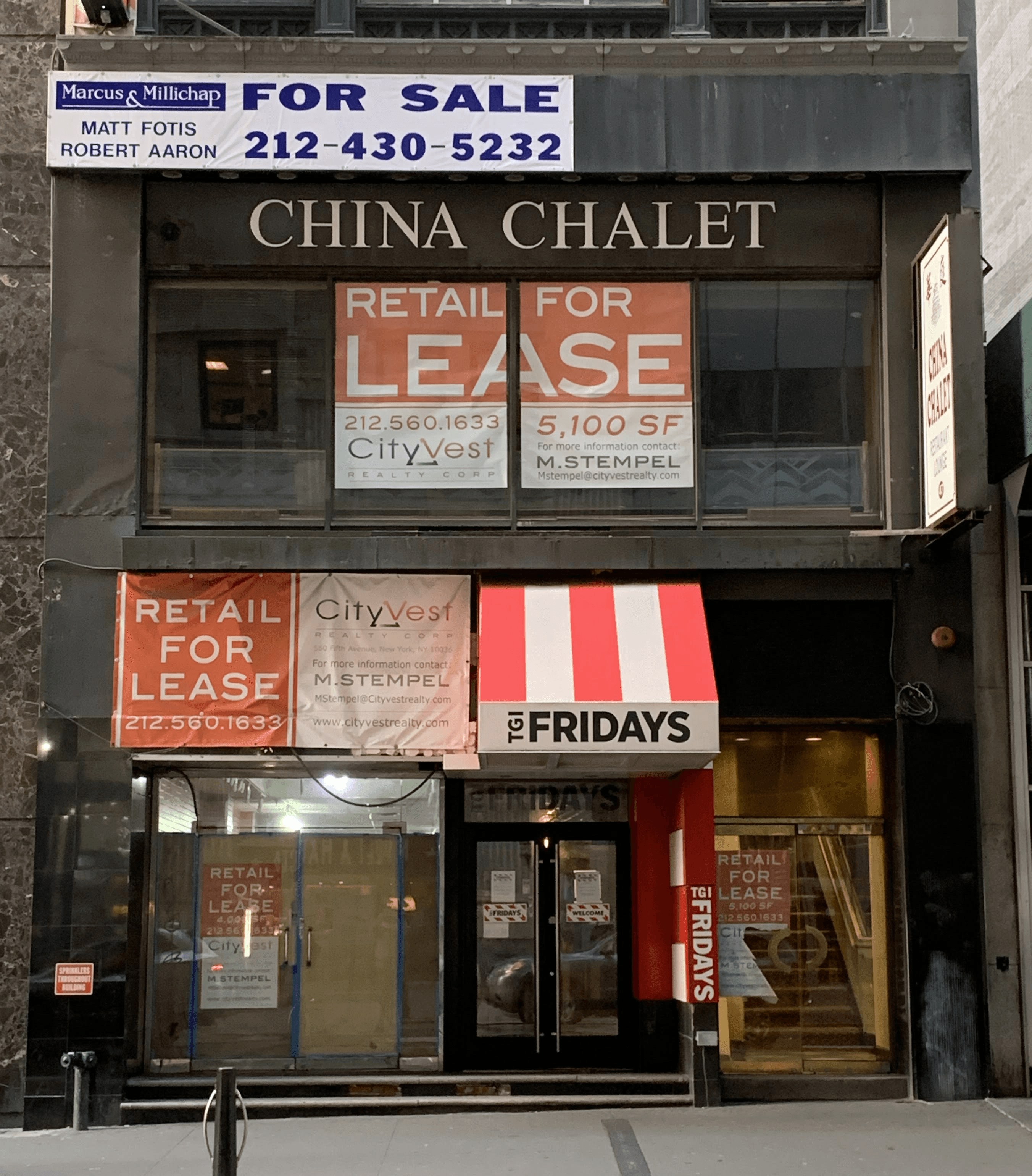
Exterior of 47 Broadway in December 2021, with China Chalet signage still visible

China Chalet opened in 1975 in the Financial District of Manhattan in New York City, located on Broadway near Exchange Place. The restaurant served American Chinese cuisine in a luxury dim sum banquet hall-style setting, with a seating capacity of over 800 across three divided sections, and full bar service at two bars. Its design was typical of Chinese banquet halls in commercial Manhattan that catered to businesspersons: "sumptuously carpeted, with swagged curtains at the windows, and waiters formally clad in vests and ties." The restaurant maintained this style of service and design until its 2020 closure, and was one of the longest-operating Chinese banquet halls in the Wall Street area.

Beginning in the mid-2000s, China Chalet began to rent out its space for use as a concert venue and club for nighttime popup events, while continuing to operate as a restaurant during daytime hours. New York reported that the first such party, an after-party for an exhibition of works by photographer Glynnis McDaris, was held in 2005; McDaris and her partner Gemma Ingalls subsequently began to host regular parties at the restaurant. These and similar events attracted an "artsy crowd" to China Chalet that starkly contrasted the restaurant's traditional daytime clientele; by 2011, The New York Times reported that China Chalet had "been a favorite hideaway of the fashion and art crowd for about five years." The low cost to rent the space led China Chalet to develop a reputation for hosting parties catering to a "broad spectrum of sexual identities, ethnicities and economic means".

China Chalet permanently closed in 2020. Though no reason for the closure was given, the economic downturn prompted by the COVID-19 pandemic was speculated as a probable cause by multiple outlets. Two additional China Chalet locations operated, on the Upper East Side and in Eltingville, Staten Island, respectively. The Eltingville location opened in 2006 and closed in 2020, while the Upper East Side location closed by 2021.

== Reception and legacy ==
"Girls with painted lips sniff bumps of cocaine off of their house keys, and fashion photographers climb onto tables, cameras in hand. Tattooed DJs rub elbows with published poets and design icons. It’s easy to forget that come morning, this place will transform back into a mediocre dim-sum joint, populated by a sleepy lunch crowd oblivious to the previous night’s escapades."

— Eliza Dumais, Thrillist

The New York Times described parties at China Chalet "as if New York's art world had been transported to a Holiday Inn in the Midwest", while Women's Wear Daily called it the "Studio 54 of the Instagram era". Writing for Eater, restaurant critic Robert Sietsema described China Chalet as "a specter of timeworn elegance" evoking the "waning era of the three-martini lunch." Vice noted that China Chalet's popularity as a party venue came at "an inflection point" for New York City nightlife, as "stalwarts like Beatrice Inn and Bungalow 8 began to fade in 2009 due to the 2008 financial crisis" and "the city’s cool kids decamped to various new stomping grounds."

Multiple figures in New York politics and finance dined at China Chalet, including former mayor Rudy Giuliani and former NYPD police commissioner William Bratton. Parties at China Chalet were held or attended by Cardi B, Timothée Chalamet, Carol Lim, Mary-Kate and Ashley Olsen, Ari Marcopoulos, Aurel Schmidt, and Rita Ackermann. Fashion brands such as Calvin Klein and Prada held shows at China Chalet during New York Fashion Week, while Vogue regularly rented the space for photo shoots. Notable artists to have performed at China Chalet include King Krule, Danny Brown, Megan Thee Stallion, and DJ Cassidy.
