= Frogtwitter =

Loose collection of alt-right Twitter personalities

Frogtwitter is a network of loosely-connected pseudonymous X (formerly Twitter) accounts characterized by promoting dissident ideas and policies associated with the alt-right that formed around writer and online personality Costin Alamariu.

== History ==
The name itself is likely to have derived from either the Pepe the Frog meme or from Aristophanes' comedy The Frogs, as speculated by Josh Vandiver. There was a wave of Twitter suspensions for Frogtwitter members in early 2017, followed by a one-off art exhibition in Dalston (a neighborhood of London) open until that May.

== Definitions and descriptions ==
Definitions and descriptions of Frogtwitter vary depending by source and perspective. BuzzFeed simply refers to it as "Alt Right on Twitter." Jacob Siegel, writing for The Baffler, calls it a group "with a similar blend of reactionary and post-libertarian thinking" to Cody Wilson. Siegel also interviewed a member of Frogtwitter, who states, "a lot of it is just having fun with words on the internet... intellectualizing while wanting to communicate serious ideas in a very high-noise environment", and that the group's main thesis is that "there's a decadence, a decline and eventually it will be followed by something else." Ben Schreckinger, writing for Politico, described it as "a network [...] that revel[s] in mythic, aristocratic pasts while trafficking in racism and anti-Semitism."

Andrew Sabisky, writing for International Business Times UK, quoted "Kantbot" summarising Frogtwitter as "the last bastion of indiscriminate and all-embracing cultural criticism; a space not for ideology, but for pure, truly unfiltered critique. It is an anti-political sphere, in many ways, or perhaps one of a politics of pure aesthetics." Sabisky himself lauds Frogtwitter for "the magic of frogtwitter [that] lies in the balance between the darkness of their nihilism and the joyous, majestic, life-affirming vitality with which they express it, buttressed by a fierce intelligence." Ben Sixsmith writing for The American Conservative notes that trying to define Frogtwitter could lead to embarrassment, but he tries by saying "its inhabitants tend to be young, male, white, and nationalistic, but also less fixated on race than the alt-right and more cynical, literary, esoteric, and mischievous. They love to walk the line between satire and seriousness, to get a reaction as with other trolls, but also to deconstruct what they see as artificial forms of social meaning." Dan DeCarlo writing for Claremont Institute's American Mind sums up Frogtwitter as a short-lived, bizarro right-wing avant-garde, and lauds it as a nihilistic collective art project that struggles with the end of liberalism and "a spiritual mutiny against the religion of progressive liberalism."

According to popular member "Bronze Age Pervert", as quoted by Tara Isabella Burton for Vox, Frogtwitter does not advocate for a particular political project but is rather a "dissatisfaction with modern life in many ways for the same reasons liberals were dissatisfied before... It's a world that's tightly controlled, repressive, ugly, extremely polluted." Jacob Siegel notes that Frogtwitter limits its "activism" to tweets alone, but that may not be without consequence, troll and noted 2016 election influencer "Ricky Vaughn" is being sued for the spreading of misinformation and election interference.

== Themes ==
Ben Schreckinger did a brief survey of some of the themes occupying the minds of Frogtwitter: "Figures in this space frequently refer to their belief that elite media is preparing Americans for a future in which their quality of life is greatly diminished and people are reduced to eating insects for protein". And "because this corner of the internet fixates on population genetics and has a high affinity for Slavic and northern European cultures, there is a fascination with the Udmurt people, a small ethnic group that lives mostly in Russia, and the fact that a high proportion of its members have red hair." The accounts also "oppose mass migration, echoing the themes of the Great Replacement conspiracy theory (...) [which] claims that European elites are secretly conspiring to replace their countries' white majorities with immigrants from Africa and the Middle East."

GNET researchers Joshua Molloy and Eviane Leidig highlight particular aspects of Frogtwitter's affection for raw food diets and its distaste for PUFAs, seed oils and soy products.

Andrew Sabisky describes a viral tweet, retweeted by Ann Coulter, by user "menaquinone4" as typical Frogtwitter output which both affirmed and mocked the "Deep state" conspiracy theory by contrasting two pictures, one of a movie star playing a spy holding a sniper rifle next to a picture of former CIA member and 2016 presidential candidate Evan McMullin eating a snack, headed by the caption: "deep state: what you think ur getting vs. what you're actually getting".

"Kantbot"'s viral moment in late 2016 exemplifies some of Frogtwitter's more esoteric themes. Jacob Siegel describes the event in The Baffler: "you may have encountered the viral video of a portly, curly-haired young man in glasses and peacoat going on about Thule. He is holding forth at an anti-Trump rally to an amused reporter and an agitated crowd, explaining that president [Trump] is going to resurrect the lost city of Atlantis and do what Hegel and Fichte could not, by completing the system of German idealism."

== Notable members and adjacencies ==
Prominent members of Frogtwitter mentioned in the media were:

- Bronze Age Pervert
- Kantbot
- basedbrooklyn
- menaquinone4
- Melchizekek
- TV KWA
- L0m3z
- Zero HP Lovecraft
- Logo Daedalus
- Jared Taylor Swift
- Paul Town
- Dr. Benjamin Braddock
- Second City Bureaucrat
- Raw Egg Nationalist
- Stone Age Herbalist
- 17thCenturyShytePost
- (Just) Loki Julianus

These personalities often boast many thousands of online followers.

Anarchist Cody Wilson is said to engage with Frogtwitter, and, according to Jacobin, Frogtwitter is adjacent to incel subculture. The Baffler brings up Frogtwitter's adjacency to the neoreactionary movement. Joshua Molloy and Eviane Leidig make note of the close relationship between the Right Wing Bodybuilder (RWBB) movement and Frogtwitter. Molloy also reports that it is rumored within Frogtwitter that JD Vance (who follows Bronze Age Pervert and Raw Egg Nationalist on X) is exposed to their ideas. According to a friend of Spectator writer Grayson Quay, Tucker Carlson's writers 'literally live' on frogtwitter.
