= Bronze Age Pervert =

Romanian-American Internet personality (born 1980)

- Born: Costin Vlad Alamariu; 21 May 1980 (age 46); Bucharest, Romania
- Education: Massachusetts Institute of Technology (BS); Columbia University (MA); Yale University (PhD)
- Years active: 2013–present
- Known for: Far-right social media activity

Bronze Age Pervert, also known as BAP, is a pseudonymous far-right Internet personality, associated with the manosphere. The media has identified Costin Vlad Alamariu (born May 21, 1980), a Romanian-American, as the person behind the pseudonym.

In his writings on X, his podcast Caribbean Rhythms with Bronze Age Pervert and in his self-published 2018 book Bronze Age Mindset, BAP advances reactionary ideas influenced by Nietzschean philosophy, promoting what he considers the heroic ideals of classical antiquity and denouncing modern society as decadent. He has a dedicated cult following in Western right-wing political circles.

== Identity ==
In 2023, Politico identified the writer Costin Alamariu as the person behind the pseudonym, making reference to other articles and podcasts that had previously identified him. According to Politico, neither Alamariu nor BAP responded to requests for comment, and Alamariu did not deny being BAP when the association was previously made. Graeme Wood of The Atlantic has also identified him, claiming he has known Alamariu for many years.

Alamariu was born in Romania in 1980 and immigrated to the U.S. with his family at the age of 10. He attended Newton South High School near Boston and wrote for the school's newspaper. Alamariu was a classmate and friend of B. J. Novak, who also wrote for the newspaper. In 1997 the two of them, along with Novak's brother Jesse and Peter Owen Nelson pranked visitors at the Boston Museum of Fine Arts by replacing the guided tour with a fake performed by Alamariu, which slowly but steadily became more surreal and profanity laden.

After graduating from high school, Alamariu majored in mathematics at MIT, and studied philosophy as a graduate student at Columbia University. He graduated with a Ph.D. in political science from Yale, with a 2015 dissertation titled The Problem of Tyranny and Philosophy in the Thought of Plato and Nietzsche. At the universities he attended, he was active in criticizing the perceived left-wing bias of academia.

Alamariu was born to a Romanian mother and father. His father was Jewish. He was baptized as an infant in the Romanian Orthodox Church.

== Work ==
=== X (formerly Twitter) ===
BAP is an active X user but has posted under multiple handles, and on multiple sites. The earliest identified posts by the "Bronze Age Pervert" persona appeared on now-defunct web forums in 2010. The Twitter account @bronzeageperv then joined Twitter in November 2013 and developed links to Curtis Yarvin before the account was banned in February 2017. BAP joined Twitter again in March 2017 under the handle @bronzeagemantis. On August 4, 2021, Twitter suspended BAP again. As a result, BAP switched to using Telegram until he was later reinstated on Twitter. After the reinstatement of his account by Elon Musk, BAP's Twitter following continued to grow and "restored structure to a movement that commonly refers to itself as the 'authentic' right-wing Twitter." A separate account with the handle @costin_eats is used by Costin Alamariu when not writing under the 'BAP' pseudonym.

BAP's original Twitter biography stated: "Steppe barbarian. Nationalist, Fascist, Nudist Bodybuilder! Purification of world. Revolt of the damned. Destruction of the cities!" It later described him as a "Free speech and anti-xenoestrogen activist." The banner above BAP's Twitter profile was a close up photo of Cellini's Perseus with the Head of Medusa, and his posts are a mix of post-ironic far-right memes with images of bodybuilders. The images are often considered homoerotic in nature but Josh Vandiver suggested that "[BAP] and his followers regularly celebrate images of handsome and muscular young white men. (...) The images depict men in typical ways for Western masculinities: active, in motion, subjects shaping the world, not sexual objects. BAP posts images of virile young men on beaches or surfboards in tropical locales—including the Caribbean and Baja California—with captions stating they are 'conquering' or 'cleansing' such territories. These are geopolitical visions, a form of popular geopolitics calling for expansion and conquest of the global South."

The account is part of Frogtwitter, a group of pseudonymous online writers with a highly negative view of contemporary American society. This group mythologizes an aristocratic past while engaging in racism and antisemitism, often through memes laden with heavy irony. BAP frequently condemns alt-right leadership figures, such as Richard Spencer. BAP and his acolytes are at odds with white nationalist Nick Fuentes and his groypers, and Fuentes has claimed that Curtis Yarvin and BAP are "at the forefront of a rising Thiel-funded faction of the Right."

A number of right-wing politicians have been criticized for following or interacting with BAP on Twitter, including former White House speechwriter Darren Beattie, Minnesota state senator Roger Chamberlain, vice president of the United States JD Vance, and US Senate candidate Lauren Witzke. Technology investor Peter Thiel has on more than one occasion referenced BAP in speeches to conservative audiences. In February 2017, Curtis Yarvin sarcastically claimed to The Atlantic that Bronze Age Pervert was his White House "cutout / cell leader". In addition to right wing politicians, the broad group of political influencers, bloggers, and podcasters known as "anti-woke leftists" or "dirtbag leftists" have received criticism in the press for discussing and engaging with BAP and the broader far right on Twitter, most notably Anna Khachiyan of the Red Scare podcast.

Josh Vandiver of Ball State University observed that Bronze Age Pervert's "cult" following seems to be global in nature with images appearing on social media of "readers holding the book aloft before beaches and mountains across the world". Bronze Age Pervert's followers often imitate elements of his Twitter account, his writing style, and repeat catchphrases such as "SUBMIT!" and "ghey". Vandiver uses the example of the last term to explain "[w]hen accused of being 'ghey,' [BAP's] preferred spelling of 'gay' – one of many insider code words, partly necessitated by social media censors – BAP accuses his accusers of being themselves hopelessly effete, often by way of comparison to imagined forefathers from a more virile, 'bronze' age". Additionally, Bronze Age Pervert's Twitter followers will "post images of their own physiques, sometimes under the hashtag '#frogtwitter,' seeking BAP's approval and coveted retweet" as well as self-publish their own 'BAPish' books, memes and writings that BAP will generously crosspromote via retweets. By 2023 Vandiver notes that "[d]espite multiple instances of deplatforming from social media, BAP’s following is now large and we can identify 'BAPism' as a masculinist subculture" and that BAP's influence and essays can be found in and on multiple (web)zines (e.g. Man's World) where "masculinist identitarians move feverishly between high theory and jocular memetics, metapolitical musings and geopolitical ambitions."

=== Bronze Age Mindset ===
Bronze Age Mindset
- Author: Bronze Age Pervert
- Cover artist: Owen Cyclops
- Language: English
- Subject: Philosophy, identity politics, masculinity
- Publisher: Independently published
- Publication date: June 6, 2018
- Pages: 198
- ISBN: 978-1983090448

Bronze Age Pervert self-published the book Bronze Age Mindset via Amazon in June 2018. The 77-chapter "exhortation" is written with intentionally poor grammar, mixing Nietzschean philosophy with criticisms of modern society.

The book centers on BAP's ideal vision, the eponymous "Bronze Age Mindset", which he defines as "the secret desire… to be worshiped as a god!" and which he calls a state "of complete power and freedom". The book's main theme argues against the concept of human equality. BAP discusses classical figures, including Alcibiades, Periander of Corinth, and the heroes of the Homeric epics. In particular, BAP argues that the historical figures of the pirate and soldier of fortune are heroic ideals and asserts that classical education is wasted on both (social) liberals and conventional conservatives. Although BAP does not provide sources, notes or formal references in the book, he mentions Nietzsche, Schopenhauer and pre-Socratic thinkers like Heraclitus very frequently.

==== Reception ====
The New Republic describes the book as "rambling", "dizzying", displaying "prose … artfully penned" but "arguments … fractured and incoherent". The Economist echoes the "rambling" classifier. Elisabeth Zerofsky in the New York Times calls the book "a pseudo Nietzschean critique of modernity" written "in a style that mixe[s] a kind of faux-caveman brutishness and message-board pidgin with classical references". Book reviewer Inga-Lina Lindqvist of Swedish Aftonbladet cautions readers that despite the often impenetrable fever-dream style, "to simply dismiss BAP as yet another internet maniac who read Nietzsche and misunderstood Homer's humanistic intentions does not fly. He's too educated, too funny and too influential for that." BAP's thinking is marked by deep anti-egalitarianism. Andrew Marzoni in Aeon Magazine is less impressed and calls the book "Nietzschean pastiche", "a tedious commentary on classical philosophy", an unoriginal, basic paleoconservative call to action after "100 pages of manipulating Empedocles and Heraclitus into refutations of evolutionary biology, civilizational progress, the liberation of women and LGBTQ groups, and the contemporary effeminisation of men (much of which omits definite articles in mock imitation of a caveman)". Nathan Robinson of Current Affairs magazine writes that BAP in Bronze Age Mindset does not attempt to make (any) logical arguments, hides behind a mask of irony and compares the book to Hitler's Mein Kampf multiple times, finally concluding that "all of this ultimately does restate Mein Kampf, albeit with fewer (not zero) references to Jews and the absence of a particular narrative about avenging Germany's national humiliation at Versailles."

In 2019, conservative essayist Michael Anton reviewed Bronze Age Mindset for the Claremont Review of Books. Anton claims that the book's provocativeness makes it successful and popular among right wing youths. Bronze Age Mindset was first given to Anton by Curtis Yarvin, creator of the neoreactionary movement, and Darren Beattie encouraged Anton to read it. The Straussian Claremont Institute subsequently published a symposium on the review in their online publication The American Mind, including a response essay from BAP in which he compared "the anti-male and anti-white rhetoric of the new left" to anti-Tutsi propaganda before the Rwandan genocide.

Tara Isabella Burton in her discussion of Bronze Age Mindset in her own book Strange Rites highlights BAP's tirades against the "bugman", a concept of a human analogous to Nietzsche's and Kojève's idea of the wretched "last man". According to Burton, BAP spends most of Bronze Age Mindset deriding progressive men of the twenty-first century, whom she describes as beta males denuded of their strength by modernity.

Bronze Age Mindset gained a following in right-wing circles, including staffers of the Trump White House and on Capitol Hill, according to anonymous sources described by Politico. National Review writer Nate Hochman claims that many of his peers who read the book and Anton's review of it ended up interning at the Claremont Institute, and asks, "Why did every junior staffer in the Trump administration read 'Bronze Age Mindset?' There was something there that was clearly attractive to young conservative elites." In the summer of 2018 it was among the top 150 books sold on Amazon sitewide, which is notable according to Anton and Dan DeCarlo since it was achieved without the aid of a publicist or book deal. In October 2019, it was still ranked third in Ancient Greek History and #174 in Humour on the Amazon best-seller list.

=== Caribbean Rhythms with Bronze Age Pervert ===
In August 2019, BAP began a political commentary/history podcast called Caribbean Rhythms with Bronze Age Pervert. In 2023 it had approximately 6,500 paying subscribers. According to the conservative National Review, the podcast uses a narrative style that highlights the great man theory. Almost every episode starts with an excerpt from Strauss's "Blue Danube Waltz." Most episodes feature other pieces from the classical music canon during segment breaks, like works from Beethoven, Rachmaninoff, Bach and more. BAP employs a thick Romanian accent on the show of which journalist Helen Lewis says "[t]here’s almost an 'I am Dracula' level to hamming up the accent. (...) this is somebody who’s playing a character on the internet."

James Noel Ward at the American University of Paris describes BAP as "a combination jester, mad prophet, comic character, and Rabelaisian oracle" and highlights BAP's frequent use of slapstick humor (among various other forms) on his podcast: "[BAP] interrupts his podcasts with fantastic pauses as he receives attacks by Israeli commandos, insidious malign agents, exotic carnivorous animals, biting tropical insects, and unseen vampiric forces." Graeme Wood characterizes this more darkly: "[BAP] digresses as if not in control of his own thoughts. He barks insults and orders at subordinates in his recording studio, and one can reasonably wonder whether these figures are comic creations or psychotic delusions".

=== Selective Breeding and the Birth of Philosophy ===
In September 2023, BAP, under his identity Costin Alamariu, published a book titled Selective Breeding and the Birth of Philosophy. The book is a re-release of Alamariu's 2015 doctoral dissertation, originally titled "The Problem of Tyranny and Philosophy in the Thought of Plato and Nietzsche," with the addition of an introduction section. In the book Alamariu makes a case for eugenics and challenges contemporary Western morality by celebrating Nietzschean ideals of strength, aristocracy, and tyranny over modern constitutionalism and democracy. Upon launch it briefly cracked Amazon's top 25 bestsellers.

Political scientist Matthew McManus points out that the work of Alamariu/BAP is influential in, and part of a wider far right philosophical project to reform modern society with natalist and eugenic ideas and ultimately policy. Which McManus summarizes as: "[t]he idea is essentially that our society has become excessively effeminate, weak, compassionate (...) and what [the hard right] want to do is breed or elevate an aristocratic class that's going to be masculine, violent, not necessarily motivated by, let's call it empathy." As BAP Alamariu proposes rebreeding "the original Aryan race, or as close an approximation as possible, through some kind of a Platonic Lebensborn program".

==== Reception ====
Economist Tyler Cowen wrote some brief comments on the book on his blog Marginal Revolution and questions the premise of Alamariu's book that the sexual marketplace is indeed "the pinnacle of every other market" noting that people spend a lot of time not having sex. Further he notes that socialization and not purely breeding plays an important role in how next generations are constituted. Cowen remarks that the book still very much reads like a dissertation. Julius Krein of American Affairs magazine reviewed Alamariu's book and notes that despite Alamariu's insistence on not being a Straussian, Alamariu's work shares significant thematic overlap with Leo Strauss's philosophy, particularly in its exploration of the tension between philosophy and political authority. Krein also observes that while Alamariu rejects the Straussian approach to political conservatism, his arguments largely restate Straussian ideas, merely adopting a provocative tone to suggest, among other things, that philosophers and tyrants are natural allies in their opposition to egalitarianism. Dustin Sebell of Michigan State University reviewed the book for First Things and like Krein he believes that Alamariu's arguments rely too much on shock value. Furthermore he argues that Alamariu's core thesis—that virtue and philosophy arise from hereditary breeding rather than education and socialization—is not sufficiently historically substantiated by Alamariu and internally contradictory. Sebell also thinks that Alamariu misunderstands the philosophical concept of nature, conflating it with natural right.

== Criticism ==
While BAP complains that society has become "something approaching [a] mass concentration camp," journalist Graeme Wood notes that BAP's classmates, many of whom were also fascinated by Nietzsche, have not been spiritually and socially crushed by the concentration camp's matriarchy and "bug men" but instead have gone on to success, holding "good jobs", and being married with families. Wood also comments on BAP's tendency towards homophobia (use of "fag" and "facefag" as insults), while at the same time glorifying bodybuilding, posting of "images of half-naked white hunks in the flower of youth," and sending photos of himself shirtless to friends—practices frequently associated with sexual attraction to the same sex. Bryan Garsten points out that Greek heroes were not all focused on male beauty and bonding, or warfare and conquest of inferiors. Odysseus's "greatness emerged not from his rejection of this world ... He owed myriad debts to those around him: to his men, to his son, to his wife." He also questions the virtue of aristocratic tyranny. "Life in a liberal democracy is full of demanding moments ... As far as I have read, life under tyrants is full of lassitude, selfishness, duplicity, betrayal." William A. Gaston (a political theorist, former Marine, and Brookings Institution scholar) asks how the allegedly weak and flabby liberalism of the United States and its allies was able to defeat the virile fascism of Germany and Japan in World War II.

Political philosopher John Gray dismisses BAP's philosophy as juvenile, adolescent and ultimately merely a flash in the pan, writing in The New Statesman that "BAP's image of male predation, rapine and pillage is the fantasy of an aspiring teenage gang member in a disintegrating modern city" and "[h]is adolescent philosophy will soon be forgotten." Political scientist Mark Lilla shares Gray's disdain for BAP's "preposterous" ideas and figure and reiterates that BAP's audience mainly consists of "acned young men". Political philosopher Harvey Mansfield, who was one of BAP's Yale thesis examiners, argues that "[BAP is] a deliberate seeker of what is vulgar and what is uncivilized, or on the edge of civilization. [BAP] wants to make a point of the dirty necessities of politics and of founding (...) as people are on the edge of beginning civilization. That might be where the greatest truth or the greatest insight into the need for violence is most obvious."

Political science professor C. Bradley Thompson has criticized BAP's illiberal, anti-equality, anti-American, anti-rationalist stances and considers Bronze Age Pervert and his writings to be more or less fascist in nature. Other (Christian) right-wing critiques, like those of Dan DeCarlo, tend to focus on the "empty aesthetics" of the youthful "BAPist" movement and it being "a deeper recrudescence of paganism", (Note: BAP adheres to a type of neopaganism he describes as "an innate sensation, a natural animism".) Evan Myers also points out that the brand of "vitalism" that BAP promotes is a neopagan and illiberal ideology. Robert P. George names BAP as a noteworthy example of a novel trend of "conservative neopagan decadence" on the American right-wing. Jesse Russell notes that fundamentally, the right wing critique of "BAPism" differs little from the critique by the conventional right of the alt-right movement during Donald Trump's 2016 presidential campaign. BAP is part of a cohort of right-wing intellectuals radicalizing the American conservative movement and the Republican Party according to Damon Linker in The New York Times. Political scientist Matt McManus writes that "BAP is not really a conservative or even a reactionary. In fact, [BAP] despises conservatives almost as much as he detests the Left" and argues that BAP's adherence to Nietzsche's "aristocratic radicalism" makes him better understood "as a kind of ultra-fascist of the Julius Evola stripe: someone for whom classical fascism is too democratic, too populist, and too vulgar." An old Yale classmate claims that BAP aspired to become a sort of 'Slavoj Žižek of the Right', meaning a respected and influential intellectual but with a distinct popular appeal. Blake Smith of the University of Chicago points out the strong influence of conservative political philosopher Leo Strauss on BAP's thinking. Journalist Katherine Stewart documents the Straussian Claremont Institute's ongoing intellectual flirtation with BAP and broader New Right ideology in Money, Lies, and God. Nicolas Truong in Le Monde and Octave Larmagnac-Matheron in Philosophie Magazine make note of the close ideological proximity between BAP and the neoreactionary movement (NRx) led by Curtis Yarvin and Nick Land. Nicholas Low of Harvard Divinity School connects "BAP's impious brand of pseudo-philosophy" and effective accelerationism (e/acc) as ascendant strains of reactionary pseudo-Nietzschean thought that "enshrine visions of superhumanity at the heart of their worldviews: both revolve around outlandish dreams of superhuman life".

Vassar College's Pharos project, whose mission is "to document appropriations of Greco-Roman culture by hate groups online", claims that BAP is providing the "traditionalist right wing" with a tailor-made "mythic" narrative that depends "on a toxic blend of misogyny and white supremacy, with the ancient world as its archetype and source of prestige."

BAP is considered to be an (ultra)masculinist. Political scientist Josh Vandiver writes that the broader alt-right and the manosphere, both of which he considers BAP to be a prominent member of, "is unique, and a product of its time, in making masculinity an overt discursive subject and a core (if contested) concept in its ideology, a type of masculinism" which should be understood as "reactions to the perceived triumph of feminist and LGBTQ politics", and thus were critical to the creation of the alt-right. Within that so-called manosphere, masculinity in its various forms is explicitly named and its relation to politics, culture, society, sex, and sexuality is vigorously debated. He also notes that BAP, as well as other alt-right platforms, have revived the idea of the Männerbund, which Vandiver describes as "the intensive grouping of male warriors and initiates understood to have dominated pre-Christian Indo-European societies, especially Germanic ones." Vandiver concludes by cautioning that BAP and the rest of the manosphere "will continue to take the [far right] movement into unusual and uncharted territory".

Researchers Joshua Molloy and Eviane Leidig of the Global Network on Extremism and Technology (GNET) have identified BAP as a key influencer in a right-wing raw food movement. According to BAP, as a self-described 'anti-xenoestrogen activist', the modern food industry is "full of harmful chemicals" that "slowly destroy your essence". In particular BAP and other right-wing food influencers are very concerned about the supposed pollution of modern food with seed oils, polyunsaturated fat and soy products. Central to the far right's extreme rejection of soy products are "fears of internal weakness, and a distrust of the food supply and the rest of the modern world" according to journalist Will Sommer. To counter these supposed dietary ills BAP and others promote diets which tend to be heavy on meat and dairy consumption. Molloy and Leidig note that anti-modern ideas concerning food and diet are not new, and mass consumption of raw meat and dairy is linked to the work of alternative nutritionist Aajonus Vonderplanitz, while 'anti-xenoestrogen activism' also precedes adoption by far-right activists as it was first championed by alternative nutritionist Ray Peat, whose works are often cited and shared by BAP. According to Molloy and Leidig, the further mainstreaming of a "right-wing racial gastropolitics" when linked with further conspiracy theories about "post-Covid food supply sabotage by globalist elites" may "present the potential for violent consequences" and offers the far right further possibilities for radicalisation and retention for broader appeal. In addition to the obsession with diet Hari Kunzru in The New York Review of Books mentions BAP's promotion of "an aristocratic lifestyle of 'sun and steel'" as part of "the faddish fitness culture promoted by the contemporary right-wing 'manosphere'", which refers to a lifestyle centered around nude sunbathing and weightlifting. Kunzru notes that the "raw-meat-eating, perineum-tanning, sperm-retaining 'high-T' influencers" spreading this doctrine are "recognizably indebted to the antimodernist Völkisch movement of the early twentieth century".

Tara Isabella Burton categorizes the "BAPist" phenomenon as fundamentally an atavist, backward-looking one, which is a broader trend on the post-liberal populist right wing. According to Burton, "at once a conscious rejection of intuitionalist values and, in many ways, their natural heir, modern atavism promotes a nostalgic, masculinist vision of animal humanity." It is the nostalgic focus on an idealized notion of the past because "once upon a time, this narrative goes, in a vanished age of gods and heroes, men were men and women were women. Human beings acted in accordance with their biological destiny. Men fought wars. Women had babies." However, in each case, humanity has supposedly fallen away from its inherent nature and intended purpose. Burton argues further that atavism is not a new phenomenon at all: "from Friedrich Nietzsche onward, modern reactionary culture has fetishized the imagined past and condemned (...) 'sclerotic' (to use BAP's word) civilizations of the present." In her book Strange Rites, Burton explains that according to atavists, "real freedom" lies in submission to (biological) hierarchies, nature, strongmen and Nietzschean supermen worth submitting to. Burton adds: "as Bronze Age Pervert is fond of saying: 'SUBMIT!'". Elsewhere, Burton argues that BAP’s atavism feeds into a right-wing eschatological transhumanist-vitalist vision in which recovering primordial masculinity prefigures an imagined evolutionary ascent into a technologically and physically superior Übermensch. In the contemporary "based and red-pilled" iteration of late 19th century German vitalism "the natural vitalist home for the mind is not the body, however chiseled by Bronze Age weightlifting, but the machine, more perfected still."

The conclusion of Burton's discussion of the "BAPist" phenomenon is that it is more akin to a religious cult than a traditional political community as observed in the 20th century. Vandiver concurs with this sentiment and posits that "if a religion emerges from the Alt-Right, BAP may prove, in retrospect, to have been one of its founders." Thompson is also keen to point out that "BAP devotees treat him as prophet just as the natives first treated Kurtz in The Heart of Darkness" and that his following includes "the most unlikely of groups, namely, graduate students and junior faculty trained in political philosophy, particularly those from the so-called Straussian school of thought."

== See also ==
- Might Is Right
- Proto-fascism
- Eugenics
- Masculism
- Militarism / Männerbund
- Philosophy of Friedrich Nietzsche
- Great man theory
- Lebensphilosophie
- Nouvelle Droite
- Dark Enlightenment
- Aestheticization of politics
- Callicles
- The End of History and the Last Man / Thumos / Last Man
- Physis vs Nomos
- Leo Strauss
