= Aurel Schmidt =

Canadian artist

Aurel Schmidt (born 1982) is a Canadian artist who lives and works in New York.

== Work ==
Schmidt is primarily known for her drawings, but has also done work involving sculpture, assemblage and installation. She was included in the 2010 Whitney Biennial, and her work is included in the permanent collection of the Whitney Museum of American Art.
