= Anna Khachiyan =

American podcaster (born 1985)

- Анна Хачиян
- Born: Anna Leonidovna Khachiyan; August 23, 1985 (age 41); Moscow, Russian SFSR, Soviet Union
- Citizenship: Russia; United States
- Education: Rutgers University (BA); New York University (MA)
- Occupations: Writer; podcaster
- Notable work: Red Scare (since 2018)
- Children: 1
- Father: Leonid Khachiyan

Anna Leonidovna Khachiyan (Russian: Анна Леонидовна Хачиян; born August 23, 1985) is a Russian-born American cultural critic, writer, and co-host of the Red Scare podcast with Dasha Nekrasova, based out of New York City.

== Early life ==
Khachiyan was born in Moscow, Soviet Union, on August 23, 1985. In 1990, she immigrated to the United States with her parents and was raised in New Jersey. Her father is the Soviet mathematician and Rutgers University professor Leonid Khachiyan and her mother is Olga Pischikova Reynberg. She is of Armenian, Russian and Ashkenazi Jewish descent.

Khachiyan graduated from South Brunswick High School in 2003. She received the Patrick J. Quigley memorial scholarship from Rutgers University in 2006, studying economics and art history and graduating with honors. She completed a master's degree in art history at New York University, going on to pursue a PhD in Soviet architecture, before dropping out.

Before Red Scare, Khachiyan worked odd jobs as a restaurant hostess, illustrator and actress.

== Career ==
On March 29, 2018, Khachiyan started the cultural commentary podcast Red Scare, with co-host and actress Dasha Nekrasova. The show was initially associated with the dirtbag left. However, in recent years, Khachiyan has been identified more with the new right as well as the subculture surrounding Dimes Square. It covers current topics in American culture and politics in both a comedic and serious tone.

Khachiyan's commentary and critique of neoliberalism and feminism are influenced by historian Christopher Lasch, social critic Camille Paglia, and Michel Houellebecq. She has described herself as "an old-school moralist in the style of Camille Paglia".

In 2018, Khachiyan described Kanye West as "an artist who understands on an intuitive level that there's a difference between playing with aesthetic symbols and ascribing a moral weight to those symbols". She said that right-wing figures like Stephen Bannon, Roger Stone, Ann Coulter and Candace Owens are more "interesting" than those coming from the left, and that these right-wing female figures, though not feminists, "are definitely self-determined women, as disgusting as their politics may be".

Khachiyan has been interviewed by Eric Weinstein and by Bret Easton Ellis on their respective podcasts. She has also appeared on i24NEWS to discuss Russian-born convicted fraudster Anna Delvey, and as a speaker as part of Art Toronto's PLATFORM Speak Series.

In 2020, Khachiyan and Red Scare became aligned with right-wing politics, and supported Donald Trump in the 2024 US presidential election. The American Mind identified the George Floyd protests as a turning point in which the podcast shifted towards right-wing figures such as Bronze Age Pervert, Curtis Yarvin and "race realist" Steve Sailer. Khachiyan has praised Sailer's work, hoping that he would become "a household name". In 2025, she told Curtis Yarvin: "We've always loved [Trump], even when we had to be down-low brothers about it."

In 2022, Khachiyan met with billionaire venture capitalist Peter Thiel and U.S. Senate candidate Blake Masters. Masters, until then president of the Thiel Foundation, called Red Scare "interesting", and hinted to Vanity Fair that it could receive funding from Thiel in the future. Nekrasova and Khachiyan denied receiving any funding from Thiel.

In September 2023, Khachiyan argued the affirmative in a public debate titled "Has the Sexual Revolution Failed?", co-sponsored by The Free Press and the Foundation for Individual Rights and Expression (FIRE). She argued alongside Louise Perry that it had, against speakers Sarah Haider and Grimes.

In a November 2024 discussion with Megyn Kelly on the topic of the Donald Trump's sexual abuse of E. Jean Carroll and the accusations of sexual assault against Brett Kavanaugh, Khachiyan said that one of Trump's "best qualities" is that he "doesn't really lie", and that contrary to the common belief that Trump frequently lies, "he's actually totally honest almost 100% of the time".

In January 2025, after allegations of sexual assault against Neil Gaiman, she said, in reference to Trump's victory in the 2024 presidential election, "Are we really still doing this? #MeToo was rejected at the ballot box!"

In May 2025, Khachiyan supported a fundraiser for a woman who used the n-word against an eight-year-old child, saying: "I will support her on principle because of the importance of not letting the left dictate speech codes and torment everyone with gay race communism."

In June 2025, Khachiyan expressed support for the Trump administration's One Big Beautiful Bill Act, and criticised Elon Musk for his conduct in the Trump–Musk feud, despite praising him: "We have to be grateful to Elon because he did buy Twitter, he was a top donor to the Trump campaign. [...] I think he really did move the needle in getting a lot of the other tech moguls like Bezos and Zuckerberg to come around to the right. But when he's going on the computer and talking about how Trump should exercise more gratitude, he sounds like an ungrateful immigrant."

== Personal life ==
On the February 13, 2021 episode of The Tim Dillon Show, Khachiyan publicly announced that she was eight months pregnant with a son. The father was later confirmed as her ex-boyfriend, the composer and artist Eli Keszler. Their son was born on March 28, 2021.

Khachiyan suffers from adult-onset Still's disease, which she was diagnosed with after contracting COVID-19 in 2021. She had previously questioned the efficacy of vaccines in the efforts to curb COVID-19, describing herself as becoming "an even more conservative Covid truther".

== Filmography ==
Year	Film/Series	Role	Notes
2007	Why I Fired My Secretary		short, screenplay
2014	Facing the Same Direction	Alex	short
2020	PVT Chat	OWS Commentator	
2021	The Scary of Sixty-First	Ghislaine Maxwell doppelgänger	
