= Matthew Gasda =

American playwright

Matthew Gasda (born 1989) is an American playwright, author and essayist.

== Biography ==
Gasda was born in Bethlehem, Pennsylvania. He graduated from Syracuse University, where he studied philosophy. His works are known for their exploration of contemporary themes, often staged in intimate Off-Off-Broadway settings. He has been featured in The New York Times and New York Magazine, and is co-founder and artistic director of The Brooklyn Center for Theater Research.

Gasda gained prominence with his 2022 play Dimes Square, which explores the lives of artists and media figures in New York's Chinatown. The play was performed in unconventional venues like lofts and apartments, contributing to its underground appeal.

== Bibliography ==
=== Plays ===
- Messages (Serpent Club Press, 2015)
- The Bacchae (Serpent Club Press, 2015)
- Ardor (Serpent Club Press, 2016)
- Denmark (Serpent Club Press, 2016)
- Minotaur (Serpent Club Press, 2017)
- Dimes Square and Other Plays (Applause Books, 2023)
- Zoomers and Other Plays (Globe Pequot Press, 2025)

=== Novels ===
- Moon on Water (Serpent Club Press, 2013)
- Sonata for Piano and Violin (Serpent Club Press, 2015)
- The Blue Period (Serpent Club Press, 2020)
- The Sleepers (Arcade Publishing, 2025)
- "Stranger Beauty" (Arcade Publishing, 2026)

=== Poetry ===
- Orchid Elegy (Sagging Meniscus Press, 2017)
- Poems 2011–2021 (Serpent Club Press, 2021)
