= Dasha Nekrasova =

American actress and podcaster (born 1991)

- Даша Некрасова
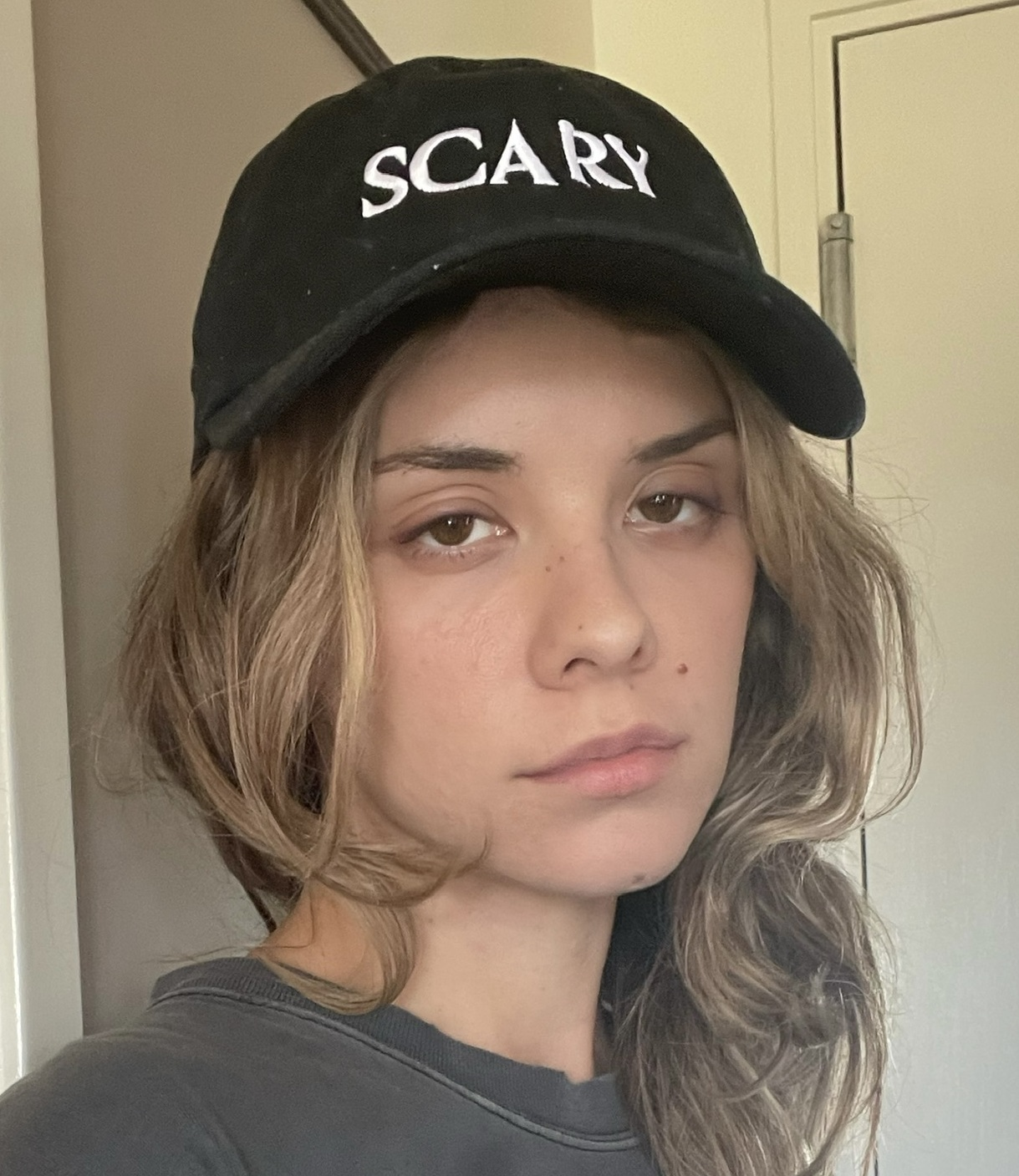
- Nekrasova in 2022
- Born: Daria Dmitrievna Nekrasova; February 19, 1991 (age 35); Minsk, Byelorussian SSR, Soviet Union
- Citizenship: American, Belarusian
- Education: Mills College (BA)
- Occupations: Actress; screenwriter; film director; podcaster
- Years active: 2014–present
- Notable work: Red Scare (since 2018)
- Partners: Adam Friedland (2018–2020); Reilly Sinanan (m. 2025)

Daria "Dasha" Dmitrievna Nekrasova (Note: Belarusian: Дар'я Дзмітрыеўна Някрасава, romanized: Dar'ya Dzmitryyewna Nyakrasava; Russian: Дарья Дмитриевна Некрасова; known by the diminutive Dasha) (born February 19, 1991) is a Soviet-born American actress, filmmaker, and co-host of the Red Scare podcast with Anna Khachiyan, based in Dimes Square, New York City.

In 2018, she became known as "Sailor Socialism" after her interview with an InfoWars reporter, in which she was dressed in a sailor fuku, went viral. In 2021, she made her directorial debut with the horror film The Scary of Sixty-First, for which she won the Best First Feature Award at the Berlin International Film Festival, and appeared in a recurring role as Comfrey on the TV series Succession.

== Early life ==
Nekrasova was born in Minsk, Byelorussian SSR, Soviet Union (now Belarus), to parents who worked as acrobats. She emigrated to the United States with her parents when she was four, settling in Las Vegas, Nevada. In an October 2025 episode of Red Scare, Nekrasova stated that a DNA test showed she had no Russian ancestry and instead identified her heritage as Estonian, Lithuanian, Latvian, and Belarusian.

Nekrasova graduated high school in 2008 at Las Vegas Academy of the Arts. She later attended Berkeley City College and transferred to Mills College, where she studied sociology and philosophy and graduated in 2012. The focus of her study was 19th-century German philosophy, in particular Friedrich Nietzsche, which she said influenced her "[less] politically as it did aesthetically".

== Career ==
Nekrasova first appeared in music videos for alternative artists such as Yumi Zouma and Tocotronic, before making her feature film debut in Wobble Palace, which she co-wrote with director Eugene Kotlyarenko. The New York Times described the film as "a sendup of broke-artist types that shimmers with abashed affection", while RogerEbert.com commented that "while your comedic milage with its loose goofiness may vary, this movie succeeds in contributing a filmic time capsule" for millennials. She appeared as the leading character in the dark comedy The Softness of Bodies, with The Hollywood Reporter saying she inhabited the role "effortlessly".

While promoting Wobble Palace at the 2018 South by Southwest Festival, her interview with right-wing media outlet InfoWars went viral. She was nicknamed "Sailor Socialism" for expressing her support for Bernie Sanders while dressed in a Japanese schoolgirl outfit resembling Sailor Moon, delivering responses such as "I just want people to have free healthcare, honey" and "You people have, like, worms in your brains". The clip was featured in a segment on Venezuela in an episode of Last Week Tonight with John Oliver.

On March 29, 2018, Nekrasova started the podcast Red Scare with co-host Anna Khachiyan. The show was initially associated with the dirtbag left. It was described in The Cut as "a critique of feminism, and capitalism, from deep inside the culture they've spawned." Daily Dot said the show's "schtick" had been summed up by former congressional staffer Simone Norman, as "when hot mean girls become public leftists." However, in recent years, the show has been identified more with the new right.

In February 2019, Nekrasova appeared – alongside Khachiyan – as a runway model at the Marlborough art gallery in Manhattan showcasing the Fall 2019 collection designed by Rachel Comey.

In 2020, Nekrasova made her directorial debut with The Scary of Sixty-First, a thriller co-written with Madeline Quinn, and inspired by the death of Jeffrey Epstein. The film premiered at the 71st Berlin International Film Festival and won the prize for Best First Feature. Later that year, Nekrasova co-wrote the short film, Spectacular Reality, inspired by conspiracy theories surrounding crisis actors and featuring models from No Agency New York, and directed the November 6, 2020 video performance of Oneohtrix Point Never's "I Don't Love Me Anymore" on The Tonight Show Starring Jimmy Fallon.

In November 2021, Nekrasova posted to Instagram a photo of herself with Alex Jones, the host of Infowars, and subsequently praised Jones on her podcast Red Scare as "an incredible entertainer".

Nekrasova appears in a supporting role in season three of the HBO drama Succession as Comfrey, a crisis PR rep.

In February 2024, it was reported that Nekrasova would be an inspiration for a track on Charli XCX's Brat. This was then confirmed by Nekrasova in June on her podcast as being the track "Mean Girls", stating "Yeah, the Charli song is kind of like a party girl anthem. It's a great song. She sent it to me a couple of months ago and told me about it."

== Personal life ==
Nekrasova was formerly engaged to comedian and talk show host Adam Friedland.

In May 2025, Nekrasova married Reilly Sinanan.

=== Political views ===
Nekrasova voted for Donald Trump in the 2024 US presidential election, after having supported Bernie Sanders in 2016. In July 2024, she told Michael Tracey on the System Update podcast: "I genuinely do love Donald Trump for the way he makes me feel. I did watch some of the RNC – I found some of it pretty electrifying. I think, in terms of images I like to see, I love Donald Trump."

In February 2023, Nekrasova debated political polarization at the Yale Political Union, where she spoke in favor of polarization, declaring that, in the aesthetics of political discourse, "extremism is sexy."

In March 2023, Nekrasova and Khachiyan attended a New York Young Republican Club party featuring Roger Stone, and in 2025 she attended a party in celebration of Trump's inauguration alongside right-wing figures such as Steve Bannon and Curtis Yarvin.

In January 2025, Nekrasova said that she hoped Trump would withdraw military aid for Ukraine, as he had promised during the election, and hoped that he "ends the war". She said this was a reason she had voted for Trump.

In November 2025, Nekrasova was fired by The Gersh Agency and dropped from the upcoming film Iconoclast following her podcast interview with far-right commentator Nick Fuentes. In the interview on her podcast, Red Scare, Nekrasova praised Fuentes with comments such as "I'm such a fan, honestly." Additionally Nekrasova, Khachiyan and Fuentes discussed "international Jewry" multiple times, advancing offensive stereotypes about Jews, Italians, Asians and others. In October 2026, Nekrasova was criticized for shaming the accuser in the 2024 Cornell University rape controversy, as well as calling women upset over the case's lack of accountability as "deranged".

=== Religious beliefs ===
Nekrasova is a self-described "Slovak-Ruthenian Greek" Eastern Catholic. She is a revert to Catholicism. She has been described as part of a conservative trend towards the Catholic Church as an aesthetic reaction against contemporary social progressivism.

In a 2020 interview, Nekrasova stated:

Catholicism is nice because it involves a whole body of work outside of the Bible—it's a very aesthetic, literary religion. My faith is just something that's improved the quality of my life, my thoughts, and my relationships [...] What's so great about faith is that it doesn't have to be grounded in rational thought. We are seeing a lot of people return to religion because everything feels so senseless and pointless, so why not be a Catholic?

Nekrasova was highly critical of Pope Francis, referring to him as a "layperson", "heretic", and "antipope", and has discussed on her podcast the topic of sedevacantism, the belief that all popes since Pope Pius XII are invalid as a result of the Second Vatican Council. Nekrasova has said that "Francis is not the real Pope, we all know it ... You're not gonna get rid of the Freemasons. You're not gonna get rid of the Jews. They infiltrated the Church a long time ago."

== Filmography ==
=== Film ===
| Year | Project | Role | Notes | Ref. |
|---|---|---|---|---|
| 2015 | The Eating Place | Fiona | Short | |
| 2015 | Hypochrondria | Belinda | Short | |
| 2015 | The Lotus Gun | Daphine | Short | |
| 2016 | The Sound of Blue, Green and Red | Jenny | Short | |
| 2017 | That Abominable Mystery | Alex | Short | |
| 2017 | My Boss Told Me to Have a Good Day, so I Went Home | Herself | Fashion film created for FFFM 2017 | |
| 2017 | The Art of Eating | Lily | Short | |
| 2017 | Prowler | The Nurse | Short | |
| 2017 | Normalize | Ms. Push Buttons | Short | |
| 2017 | The Darby Bonarsky Story | Darby Bonarsky | Short; also co-writer | |
| 2018 | Nothing Bad Will Happen | Woman | Short | |
| 2018 | Wobble Palace | Jane | Also co-writer | |
| 2018 | Softness of Bodies | Charlotte Parks | | |
| 2018 | The Ghost Who Walks | Mitzie | | |
| 2020 | PVT Chat | QT4U | | |
| 2021 | The Scary of Sixty-First | The Girl | Also writer and director | |
| 2023 | Bad Behaviour | Beverly Woods | | |
| 2023 | The Beast | Dakota | | |
| 2024 | The Code | Celine Unger | | |
| 2024 | www.RachelOrmont.com | Darci | | |
| 2025 | Materialists | Daisy | | |

=== Television ===
| Year | Project | Role | Notes | Ref. |
|---|---|---|---|---|
| 2014 | Cotton | Sasha | Web series | |
| 2017 | Steps | Orphan #2 | Web series | |
| 2019 | Mr. Robot | Celeste | Episode: "401 Unauthorized" | |
| 2019 | Cake | Barbara | Episode: "Headspace" | |
| 2019 | Dickinson | Ellen Mandeville Grout | Episode: "'Faith' is a fine invention" | |
| 2020 | The Shivering Truth | Mrs. Minugm | Voice; Episode: "The Diff" | |
| 2021 | The Serpent | Connie-Jo Bronzich | Episode: "Episode Four" | |
| 2021 | Succession | Comfrey Pellits | 9 episodes | |

=== Music videos ===
| Year | Title | Performer(s) | Ref. |
|---|---|---|---|
| 2014 | "Don't Care" | Antwon (feat. Sad Andy) | |
| 2014 | "Basements" | Future Death | |
| 2014 | "The Brae" | Yumi Zouma | |
| 2014 | "A Long Walk Home for Parted Lovers" | Yumi Zouma | |
| 2015 | "Prolog" | Tocotronic | |
| 2015 | "Rebel Boy" | Tocotronic | |
| 2016 | "I Don't Love You" | DJDS | |
| 2016 | "Taking What's Not Yours" | TV Girl | |
| 2016 | "Vinaigrette" | Gonjasufi | |

=== Video game ===
| Year | Project | Role | Notes | Ref. |
|---|---|---|---|---|
| 2019 | Disco Elysium | Klaasje Amandou | Voice; original release only, replaced in The Final Cut | |

== Awards and nominations ==
| Year | Award | Category | Work | Result | Ref. |
|---|---|---|---|---|---|
| 2021 | Berlin International Film Festival | Best First Feature Award | The Scary of Sixty-First | Won | |
