= Rachel Comey =

American fashion designer

Rachel Comey is an American independent fashion designer based in New York City. She is the founder of Rachel Comey, a clothing, shoes, and accessories brand known for its "intellectual, arts-and-crafts aesthetic."

== Early life ==
Comey was born outside of Hartford, Connecticut. In 1994, she graduated from the University of Vermont, where she focused on Asian studies, printmaking, and sculpture.

== Career and brand ==
After college, Comey worked at an art gallery in Vermont and designed a line of novelty underwear. In 1997, she moved to New York, where she worked as a freelance production assistant and later as a design consultant at Theory. During that time she began making costumes for her then-boyfriend Eugene Hutz's band, Gogol Bordello. In 2001, after her designs caught the eye of a stylist friend, Comey was commissioned to make two hand-painted shirts for musician David Bowie. She charged him $100 per shirt. Soon after, Comey was fired from Theory for performing outside work.

In September 2001, Comey presented her first menswear collection. In 2004, Comey expanded her brand to include womenswear. Of her Spring-Summer 2004 ready-to-wear collection, Vogue published, "The overall mood was pure summer, and the collection full of confident, easy clothes for cool customers with discerning eyes."

In 2009, Comey was inducted into Council of Fashion Designers of America.

Her clothes have been worn by celebrities and artists including Miranda July, Rashida Jones, Lady Gaga and more.

=== Fashion shows ===
Comey's first official fashion show took place in September 2001, days before 9/11, near her studio in Tribeca. The ad-hoc, menswear-only show was held on the street and featured models including Waris Ahluwalia and Devendra Banhart.

To present her Spring-Summer 2014 ready-to-wear collection, Comey hosted a sit-down dinner at Pioneer Works in Red Hook, Brooklyn featuring a performance by Justin Vivian Bond. Thus began a series of untraditional presentations taking place at venues including Hauser Wirth & Schimmel in Los Angeles, CA. To celebrate the brand's fifteenth anniversary in 2016, Comey presented her Spring-Summer 2017 ready-to-wear collection on the sidewalk of Crosby Street in New York City, a nod to her first-ever fashion show in 2001.

In addition to choosing unconventional venues, Comey is also known for casting unconventional models in her fashion shows. For her Spring-Summer 2016 ready-to-wear show, Comey included "artists, eccentrics, dancers, and businesswomen" in addition to professional models.

=== Unisex line ===
In March 2017, Comey introduced a line of unisex clothing – "because clothes are for everyone."

== Pop culture ==
In 2002, Comey appeared in a documentary short about Gogol Bordello.

In 2014, Comey played herself in the "Rachel" episode of the web series High Maintenance.

== Personal life ==
Comey lives with her husband, Sean Carmody, and two children in New York's SoHo neighborhood.
