= Barton Cortright =

American cinematographer

- Occupation: Cinematographer
- Years active: 2013–present
- Website: bartcortright.com

Barton Cortright is an American cinematographer who is best known for his work on The Feeling That The Time For Doing Something has Passed, The Cathedral and Drunken Noodles.

== Career ==
Cortright graduated from Carnegie Mellon with a degree in lighting and projection design for theater. After a brief career as a projection designer, he transitioned to pursuing cinematography. His work has been screened at festivals including Cannes, Venice, Berlinale, Sundance, and New York Film Festival.

== Filmography ==
=== Film ===
Year	Title	Director	Notes
2018	The World is Full of Secrets	Graham Swon	
2018	Notes on an Appearance	Ricky D'Ambrose	
2022	The Cathedral	Ricky D'Ambrose	
2022	Actors	Betsey Brown	
2023	An Evening Song (for three voices)	Graham Swon	
2023	Downtown Owl	Hamish Linklater, Lily Rabe	
2023	The Feeling That The Time For Doing Something Has Passed	Joanna Arnow	
2024	The Code	Eugene Kotlyarenko	
2024	Messy	Alexi Wasser	
2024	www.RachelOrmont.com	Peter Vack	
2025	Drunken Noodles	Lucio Castro	
2025	After This Death	Lucio Castro	
2026	Ponderosa	Rob Rice	
2026	Lucy Schulman	Ellie Sachs	
2026	What Can't Be Mentioned	Dan Sallitt	
