= Drunken Noodles =

2025 drama film

- American theatrical release poster
- Directed by: Lucio Castro
- Written by: Lucio Castro
- Produced by: Lucio Castro; Barton Cortright; Joanne Lee; Julia Bloch
- Starring: Laith Khalifeh; Joél Isaac; Ezriel Kornel; Céline Clermontois; John Arthur Peetz; Guillermo García Arriaza; Matthew Risch
- Cinematography: Barton Cortright
- Edited by: Lucio Castro
- Music by: Yegang Yoo; Robert Lombardo
- Production companies: Alsina 427; Nice Dissolve
- Distributed by: Strand Releasing
- Release dates: May 18, 2025 (Cannes); June 26, 2026 (United States)
- Running time: 82 minutes
- Countries: United States; Argentina
- Languages: English; Spanish

Drunken Noodles is a 2025 drama film written, produced, directed and edited by Lucio Castro. It stars Laith Khalifeh, Joél Isaac, Ezriel Kornel, Céline Clermontois, John Arthur Peetz, Guillermo García Arriaza and Matthew Risch.

The film had its world premiere in the ACID section of the 2025 Cannes Film Festival on May 18, where it was nominated for the Queer Palm. It was theatrically released in the United States on June 26, 2026, by Strand Releasing.

== Premise ==
Over the course of two summers, a young art student has a series of unexpected intimate encounters.

== Cast ==
- Laith Khalifeh as Adnan
- Joél Isaac as Yariel
- Ezriel Kornel as Sal
- Céline Clermontois as Gallery Owner
- John Arthur Peetz as Cruising Man in Park
- Guillermo García Arriaza as Faun
- Matthew Risch as Iggie

== Production ==
Lucio Castro was inspired to make the film by the life of Sal Salandra.

== Release ==
It had its world premiere at the 2025 Cannes Film Festival on May 18, 2025, in the ACID section. Prior to, Strand Releasing acquired distribution rights to the film. It also screened at the 2025 New York Film Festival in the Currents section on September 30, 2025. It was released in the United States on June 26, 2026.

== Reception ==
On review aggregator website Rotten Tomatoes, the film holds an approval rating of 100% based on 15 reviews, with an average rating of 7.8/10.
