= Hamid Dehghani =

Iranian director, playwright, and actor

- حمید دهقانی
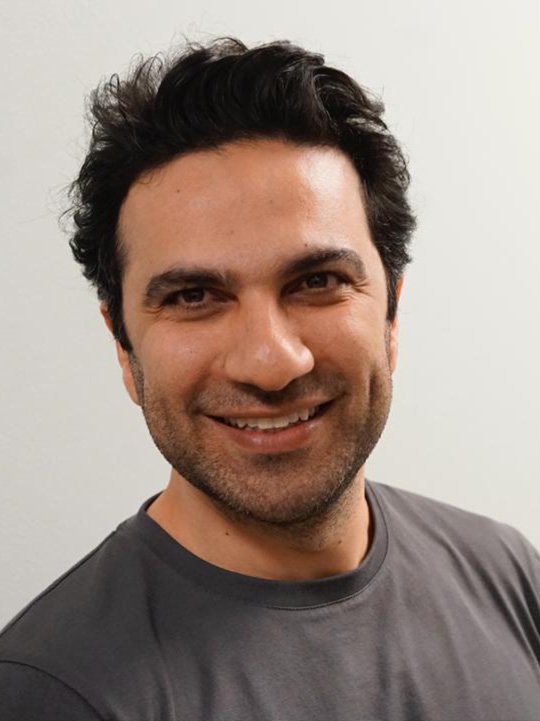
- Hamid Dehghani in 2025
- Born: 1984 (age 41–42); Iran
- Education: BA and MA in Theatre Directing (Tehran University of Art), MFA in Directing (Northwestern University)
- Occupations: Director, Playwright, Actor
- Notable work: English, Selling Kabul, From the Environs of Milad, Sohrab’s Transgression
- Awards: Princess Grace Award in Theatre
- Website: Official Website

Hamid Dehghani is an Iranian director, playwright, and actor. Dehghani has directed several notable plays, including English (play) by Sanaz Toossi and Selling Kabul by Sylvia Khoury. He has collaborated with prominent theatres such as the Goodman Theatre, Guthrie Theater, and Northlight Theatre.

== Early life and education ==
Dehghani was born in Iran. He pursued a bachelor's degree and master's degree from Tehran University of Art. He then earned an MFA from Northwestern University in 2022.

== Career ==
=== Directing ===
Dehghani has directed productions in both Iran and the United States. His major works include:

| Year | Title | Playwright | Theatre | References |
|---|---|---|---|---|
| 2024 | English (play) | Sanaz Toossi | Guthrie Theatre, Goodman Theatre | |
| 2024 | Selling Kabul | Sylvia Khoury | Northlight Theatre | |
| 2024 | Baba | Denmo Ebrahim | Amphibian Stage | |
| | From the Environs of Milad | Hamid Dehghani | Iranshahr Theater | |
| | Sohrab’s Transgression | Hamid Dehghani | Entezami Theater/Fajr International Theater Festival | |
| 2004 | Leila | Morteza Hoseinzadeh | Tehran University of Art | |
| 2004 | Nathan and Tabileth | Barry Bermange | Khourshid Theatre | |

== Awards and honors ==
- Princess Grace Award in Theatre

== Reception ==
Chris Jones of the Chicago Tribune called English "a brilliant piece of writing, dramaturgically rich, poetic and humorous, clearly based in lived experience and sufficiently nuanced to impress even relativists like me who are interested in the old liberal counterpoint".
