= Marjan Neshat =

Iranian-American actress (born 1975/1976)

- Neshat in 2026
- Born: 1975/1976 (age 49–50); Tehran, Iran
- Education: State University of New York at Purchase
- Occupation: Actress
- Years active: 2002–present

Marjan Neshat (born 1975/1976) is an Iranian actress. In 2025, her performances in the play English gave her a nomination for the Tony Award for Best Featured Actress in a Play.

== Early life ==
Born in Tehran, her family left Iran in 1984, when she was eight years-old, following incidents that caused them to fear for their safety. She had an uncle living in Seattle who managed to help get them visas to the United States. Neshat had wanted to be an actress from a young age. She moved to New York City in 1998 and studied at State University of New York at Purchase.

== Career ==
=== Stage ===
She made her Off-Broadway debut in 2002 in Donna Spector play Golden Ladder. She also appeared Off-Broadway in a production of The Seagull with Dianne Wiest and Alan Cumming in 2008. From 2021 she appeared Off-Broadway in a series of celebrate plays including Sylvia Khoury's Selling Kabul, the Sanaz Toossi Wish You Were Here, and David Cale play Sandra.

In 2022, she first appeared in Sanaz Toossi play English portraying Marjan, the teacher, when it premiered off-Broadway for the Atlantic Theater Company at the Linda Gross Theatre. It debuted on Broadway at the Roundabout Theatre Company's Todd Haimes Theatre in January 2025. He performance won her an Obie Award and in 2025, she became the first Iranian-born actress ever nominated for the Tony Award for Best Featured Actress in a Play. The play also won the 2023 Pulitzer Prize for Drama.

Year	Title	Role	Venue	Ref.
2002	Golden Ladder	Mary Scaccia	Off-Broadway, Players' Theatre	
2008	The Seagull	Masha	Off-Broadway, Classic Stage Company	
2016	Queens	Aamani/Nasima	Off-Broadway, Women's Project Theatre	
2019	Joan	Performer	Off-Broadway, Colt Coueur	
2020	Selling Kabul	Afiya	Off-Broadway, Playwrights Horizons	
2022	Wish You Were Here	Nazanin	Off-Broadway, Playwrights Horizons	
2022	Sandra	Performer	Off-Broadway, Vineyard Theatre	
2025	English	Marjan	Broadway, Todd Haimes Theatre	

=== Film and television ===
Her film credits include Sex and the City 2 (2010) and Rockaway (2017). Her television roles include New Amsterdam, Quantico, Elementary and Blue Bloods. In 2025, she played a secondary role in the Netflix thriller series The Night Agent, in which she portrayed an Iranian mother whose daughter in New York takes risks to get her out of Iran.

== Awards and nominations ==
Award	Year	Category	Work	Result	Ref.
Tony Award	2025	Best Featured Actress in a Play	English	Nominated	
Drama Desk Award	2022	The Sam Norkin Off-Broadway Award		Won	
Drama League Award	2025	Distinguished Performance	English	Nominated	
Obie Awards	2022	Special Citation	English	Won	
Obie Awards	2023	Special Citation	English	Won	

== Personal life ==
She has a son, Wilder.

== See also ==
- List of Iranian actresses
