= After This Death =

- Directed by: Lucio Castro
- Written by: Lucio Castro
- Produced by: David Hinojosa; Anita Gou; Patrick Donovan; Caroline Clark; Luca Intili
- Starring: Mía Maestro; Lee Pace; Rupert Friend; Gwendoline Christie; Philip Ettinger
- Cinematography: Barton Cortright
- Edited by: Kali Kahn
- Music by: Robert Lombardo; Yegang Yoo
- Production companies: 2AM; Kindred Spirit
- Distributed by: Sundance Now
- Release dates: February 19, 2025 (Berlinale); November 20, 2026 (United States)
- Running time: 96 minutes
- Country: United States
- Languages: English; Spanish

After This Death is a 2025 American romantic drama film written and directed by Lucio Castro. It stars Mía Maestro, Lee Pace, Rupert Friend, Gwendoline Christie and Philip Ettinger.

It had its world premiere at the 75th Berlin International Film Festival on February 19, 2025. It was released on November 20, 2026, by Sundance Now.

== Premise ==
While hiking, Isabel meets Elliot, a musician, and the two form a connection. When she attends one of his concerts, an affair ignites, however, Elliot becomes distant and disappears.

== Cast ==
- Mía Maestro as Isabel
- Lee Pace as Elliot
- Rupert Friend as Ted
- Gwendoline Christie as Alice
- Philip Ettinger as Ronnie
- Jack Haven as Messenger
- Jordan Carlos as Carlos
- Laurent Retjo as Seymour

== Production ==
Principal photography took place in Hudson Valley, New York.

== Release ==
It had its world premiere at the 75th Berlin International Film Festival on February 19, 2025. It also screened at Tribeca Festival on June 9, 2025. In October 2026, Sundance Now was announced to have acquired distribution rights to the film, setting a November 20, 2026, release.
