= Babak Tafti =

American actor

- Occupation: Actor

Babak Tafti is an Iranian-American actor best known for the role of Emil Michael on Super Pumped, Chris in The Feeling That the Time for Doing Something Has Passed, Bradford Luke in Billions, and Eduard Asgarov in Succession.

== Career ==
Tafti graduated from the Yale School of Drama. He appeared as Saeed in the 2012 production of the J.T. Rogers play Blood and Gifts at La Jolla Playhouse. The following year, he reprised his role as Khadi Asmann in the Off-Broadway debut of Rajiv Joseph's play The North Pool; he had previously performed the role at the Barrington Stage Company. He later reprised his role as Rodney in the commercial run of Bess Wohl's play Small Mouth Sounds at the Signature Theatre Company; he had previously performed the role at Ars Nova. The following year, he performed in the world premiere of The Profane by Zayd Dohrn. He had a "breakout performance" as Cassio in the Shakespeare in the Park 2018 production in Othello.

After appearing in small roles on television, Tafti was cast as Eduard Asgarov in a recurring role in season 2 of Succession. He landed his first series regular role as Emil Michael on Super Pumped in 2022. He appeared in a recurring role of Bradford Luke on Billions the following year.

== Filmography ==
=== Film ===
| Year | Title | Row | Notes |
|---|---|---|---|
| 2008 | $5 a Day | Room Service Waiter | —N/a |
| 2009 | Flicker | Jack | —N/a |
| 2009 | Terminator Salvation | Malik | —N/a |
| 2019 | Swing Shift | Trevor | Short film |
| 2019 | Benim | Yusuf | Short film |
| 2019 | Campfire Alpha | Joey | Short film |
| 2019 | Swallow | Aaron | —N/a |
| 2019 | I Miss You | Adnan | —N/a |
| 2020 | A Dress Above | Gil | Short film |
| 2022 | Fraud | André Djawadi | Short film |
| 2022 | Rear View | August | Short film |
| 2023 | The Feeling That the Time for Doing Something Has Passed | Chris | —N/a |
| 2026 | Crime 101 | Ali | |

=== Television ===
| Year | Title | Row | Notes |
|---|---|---|---|
| 2009 | Crash | Charlie Wanz | 1 episode |
| 2011 | Blue Bloods | Hafiz Demir | 1 episode |
| 2014 | Nurse Jackie | Ajay | 1 episode |
| 2015 | Orange Is the New Black | Afghan Trainee Farzad | 1 episode |
| 2018 | Quantico | Adnan Hamza | 1 episode |
| 2018 | Instinct | Max | 1 episode |
| 2018 | Elementary | Jonathan Dawson | 1 episode |
| 2018 | New Amsterdam | Tariq Ali | 1 episode |
| 2018 | Murphy Brown | Khaled | 1 episode |
| 2019–2021 | Legacies | Sphinx | 4 episodes |
| 2019 | Succession | Eduard Asgarov | 3 episodes |
| 2020 | Bull | Dr. Samir Shadid | 1 episode |
| 2020 | Ramy | Amir | 1 episode |
| 2021 | The Equalizer | Reza Shaheen | 1 episode |
| 2022 | Super Pumped | Emil Michael | 7 episodes |
| 2023 | Billions | Bradford Luke | 11 episodes |
| TBD | Joseph of Egypt | Simeon | Post-production |

== Theatre ==
| Year | Production | Role | Venue |
|---|---|---|---|
| 2012 | Blood and Gifts | Saeed | La Jolla Playhouse |
| 2012 | The North Pool | Khadim Asmaan | Barrington Stage Company |
| 2013 | The North Pool | Khadim Asmaan | Vineyard Theatre |
| 2015 | Small Mouth Sounds | Rodney | Ars Nova / Signature Theatre Company |
| 2016 | Small Mouth Sounds | Rodney | Ars Nova / Signature Theatre Company |
| 2017 | The Profane | Sam | Playwrights Horizons |
| 2018 | Othello | Cassio | Shakespeare in the Park |
| 2019 | Selling Kabul | Taroon | Williamstown Theatre Festival |
| 2023 | English (play) | Omid | Barrington Stage Company |
| 2025 | Lowcountry | David | Atlantic Theater Company |
