= Northlight Theatre =

Northlight Theatre is a professional, non-profit theater company located in Evanston, Illinois. Established in 1974, it has become a recognized regional theater in the Chicago area, presenting a variety of contemporary and classic works.

== History ==
Northlight Theatre was founded in 1974 by Gregory Kandel, along with Mike Nussbaum and Frank Galati, as the Evanston Theatre Company. Its first season in 1975-76 featured Jumpers by Tom Stoppard, directed by Galati. The theater's name was changed to North Light Repertory, Inc. in 1978 and eventually to Northlight Theatre in 1984.

Starting in a school auditorium in Evanston, for most of its life the company produced plays in a variety of Evanston area venues. It was housed for 29 years at the North Shore Center for the Performing Arts in Skokie before moving to its own newly-built theater in downtown Evanston in September, 2026.

== Productions ==
Northlight Theatre has produced a wide variety of plays throughout its history. Some notable productions include:

- White Guy on the Bus (2015), directed by BJ Jones
- The Book of Will (2017), directed by Jessica Thebus
- Into the Breeches! (2019), directed by Shana Cooper
- Selling Kabul (2024), directed by Hamid Dehghani

== Awards and recognition ==
Northlight Theatre has earned multiple Joseph Jefferson Awards, highlighting its impact on Chicago's theater scene. The theater's dedication to new play development is exemplified through programs such as Interplay, which has facilitated the transition of many works to full productions.

== Educational and community programs ==
Northlight Theatre also offers a variety of educational programs, including student matinees and workshops. These initiatives aim to engage with the community and promote theater as an accessible art form.
