= Nitya Vidyasagar =

American actress

- Born: Muscat, Oman
- Citizenship: United States
- Occupation: Actress
- Years active: 2008–present
- Known for: Sesame Street

Nitya Vidyasagar is an American actress best known for her role as "Leela" on Sesame Street.

== Early life and education ==
Vidyasagar was born in Muscat, Oman to Telugu Indian parents and grew up in Kolkata, Bengaluru, and Hyderabad before moving to the United States in 1995 at the age of 12. She graduated from the St. Andrew's Episcopal School in 2001. She received a BFA with honors in drama and a minor in music from New York University.

== Career ==
Vidyasagar was the first Indian American cast member of Sesame Street. Leela runs a laundromat next to Mr. Hooper's Store. Sesame Street producers were not looking for an Indian American actress before they cast Vidyasagar, but the show's writers plan to use parts of Vidyasagar's background in certain episodes. Leela is described as "a young Indian American who embraces her heritage and culture".

Vidyasagar is primarily a stage actress. She trained at the Stella Adler Studio of Acting. She received praise for her performance in the drama Selling Kabul, in which she plays a central female character anxious for her brother's safety.

== Filmography ==
=== Film ===
Year	Title	Role	Notes
2009	Split Ends	Mehar Manjri	Feature film
2010	Wall Street: Money Never Sleeps	Secretary	
2017	Raksha	Archana	Short
2018	Mammoth	Nitya	Short
2019	Velvet Buzzsaw	Gita	

=== Television ===
Year	Title	Role	Notes
2008–2015	Sesame Street	Leela	Series Regular
2010	The Good Wife	Frida Verma	Season 1 Episode 20: "Mock"
2012	Smash	Jill Abrams	Season 1 Episode 5: "Lets Be Bad"
2015	The Player	Medina Raqib	Season 1 Episode 1: "Pilot"
2016	Major Crimes	Amala	Season 5 Episode 1: "Present Tense"
2017	Blue Bloods	Dr. Nadia Khan	Season 8 Episode 9: "Pain Killers"
2017	Suits	Stephanie Patel	Recurring
2018	SEAL Team	Meera Nelson	Season 1 Episode 12: "The Upside Down"
2019	Troopers	Una	Recurring
2019	S.W.A.T.	Sergeant Wilson	Season 2 Episode 21: "Day of Dread"
2019	NCIS: Los Angeles	Natasha	Season 11 Episode 10: "Mother"
2022	The Woman in the House Across the Street from the Girl in the Window	Hillary	Episode 4
2022	Station 19	Tabitha Salzman	Season 5 Episode 12: "In My Tree"
2022	All Rise	Zoya Hameed	
2025	All's Fair	Dr. Samira Ramesh	Episode: "I Want Revenge"

=== Theatre ===
Year	Title	Role	Notes
	Modern Terrorism: Or They Who Want to Kill Us and How We Learn to Love Them	Yalda Abbasi	Second Stage Theater
	The Glorious Ones	Armanda	Lincoln Center Theater
	Serendib	Anna	Ensemble Studio Theatre
	Cecilia's Last Tea Party	Cecilia	Passage Theatre Company
	A Midsummer Night's Dream	Puck	Flux Theatre Ensemble
	NINJA: The Musical	Janine	Desipina & Co
	Monetizing Emma	Emma	Planet Connections Festival
	Coney Island Avenue	Anna	New York Theatre Workshop
2022	Selling Kabul	Afiya	Ensemble Theatre Company Santa Barbara
