= Mother Future Self =

- Directed by: Tori Lancaster
- Written by: Tori Lancaster
- Produced by: Cheyenne Cage; Tori Lancaster; Stevie Borrello; Hannah Myers
- Starring: Imani Jade Powers; Betsey Brown; Juliet Brett; Ben Groh
- Cinematography: Isaac Banks; Tyler Harmon-Townsend
- Edited by: Tori Lancaster; Kali Kahn
- Music by: Jesse Scheinin
- Production companies: Human Horse, Inc
- Release date: June 5, 2026 (Tribeca Film Festival)
- Running time: 90 minutes
- Country: United States
- Language: English

Mother Future Self is a 2026 American comedy-drama film written, produced, and directed by Tori Lancaster. It stars Imani Jade Powers, Betsey Brown, Juliet Brett, and Ben Groh.

The film premiered at the Tribeca Film Festival on June 5, 2026.

== Premise ==
An experimental dance camp in rural Maine sure sounds like a great place to have a long-awaited reunion, no? Sofi and Jordan rekindle friendships and more against a gorgeous backdrop as the pendulum swings between reconciliation and rupture.

== Cast ==
- Imani Jade Powers
- Betsey Brown
- Juliet Brett
- Ben Groh

== Production ==
Principal photography occurred in 2021 and 2023, on a comedy-drama film by filmmaker Tori Lancaster, starring Imani Jade Powers, Betsey Brown, Juliet Brett, and Ben Groh. In April 2026, the film was selected to screen at the Tribeca Festival.

== Release ==
Mother Future Self premiered at the Tribeca Film Festival on June 5, 2026.
