= The Cow Who Sang a Song Into the Future =

- Theatrical release poster
- Directed by: Francisca Alegría
- Written by: Francisca Alegría; Manuela Infante; Fernanda Urrejola
- Produced by: Tom Dercourt; Alejandra García
- Starring: Mía Maestro; Leonor Varela; Alfredo Castro; Marcial Tagle; Enzo Ferrada; Laura Del Río Ríos
- Cinematography: Inti Briones
- Edited by: Andrea Chignoli; Carlos Ruiz-Tagle
- Music by: Pierre Desprats
- Production companies: Bord Cadre Films; Sovereign Films; Wood Producciones
- Release date: January 23, 2022 (Sundance)
- Running time: 98 minutes
- Countries: Chile; France; United States; Germany
- Language: Spanish
- Box office: $32,838

The Cow Who Sang a Song Into the Future (Spanish: La vaca que cantó una canción hacia el futuro) is a 2022 drama film directed by Francisca Alegría and written by Alegría, Manuela Infante & Fernanda Urrejola. It premiered at the Sundance Film Festival in late January 2022. It is a co-production between Chile, France, the United States and Germany.

== Synopsis ==
Fish are dying in Chile's rivers due to water pollution caused by human activity. Their lifeless bodies are being dragged ashore along the banks of the Cruces River. In the middle of the river, a woman named Magdalena emerges from the depths, gasping for air. She had been left for dead many years ago.

Upon returning to her family's dairy farm, her husband Enrique suffers a heart attack upon seeing her. His daughter Cecilia then returns home with her two children to take care of him. All the people who thought Magdalena were dead react in different ways to her return.

== Cast ==
- Mía Maestro as Magdalena
- Alfredo Castro as Enrique
- Leonor Varela as Cecilia
- Marcial Tagle as Bernardo
- Enzo Ferrada as Tomás

== Production ==
The film was shown for the first time on January 23, 2022 at the Sundance Film Festival. It was screened at the San Francisco International Film Festival at the end of April 2022. It was presented at the Guadalajara International Film Festival in June 2022 and at the International Film Festival Fantasy Film from mid-July 2022. Screened at the Melbourne International Film Festival in August 2022.

== Reception ==
On review aggregator website Rotten Tomatoes, the film has an approval rating of 94%, based on 31 reviews, with an average rating of 6.4/10. The site's critics consensus reads, "With a hopeful tune, The Cow Who Sang a Song Into the Future basks in magical realism to deliver a compelling family drama swathed in a powerful environmental fable." On Metacritic, the film holds a weighted average rating of 66 out of 100, based on 9 critics, indicating "generally favorable" reviews.

In her review, Caitlin Quinlan of the film magazine Little White Lies describes the film as a folkloric meditation on the relationship between humans and the environment, mother and child. Francisca Alegría's film has a mystical quality and moves fluidly through its minimalist plot. The characters stumble into dreamlike settings through a vision of a world in which they expect to live. If Magdalena's return coincides with the decline of the habitat and thus positions her as a kind of eco-prophet, this can also be understood as an allegory for Mother Earth. Even in its abstraction, The Cow Who Sang a Song Into the Future is a curious film that encourages introspection and offers a hopeful vision for collective healing.

=== Awards ===
Cleveland International Film Festival 2022

- Nominated in the New Direction Competition (Francisca Alegría)

International Film Festival in Guadalajara 2022

- Nomination in the Ibero-American Feature Film Competition

Munich Film Festival 2022

- Nomination in the CineRebels contest (Francisca Alegría)

Luxembourg City Film Festival 2022

- Nomination in the Official Competition

Melbourne International Film Festival 2022

- Nomination in the Bright Horizons Contest

Miami Film Festival 2022

- Knight Marimbas Award Nomination

Neuchatel International Fantastic Film Festival 2022

- Nomination in the international competition

San Francisco International Film Festival 2022

- Nomination in the Latino Film Competition
