= End of the Century (film) =

2019 Argentine romantic drama film

- Theatrical release poster
- Spanish: Fin de siglo
- Directed by: Lucio Castro
- Written by: Lucio Castro
- Produced by: Joanne Lee
- Starring: Juan Barberini; Ramón Pujol; Mía Maestro
- Cinematography: Bernat Mestres
- Edited by: Lucio Castro
- Music by: Robert Lombardo
- Production companies: Alsina 427; JWProductions
- Distributed by: Cine Tren
- Release dates: 30 March 2019 (New Directors/New Films Festival); 6 February 2020 (Argentina)
- Running time: 84 minutes
- Country: Argentina
- Language: Spanish

End of the Century (Spanish: Fin de siglo) is a 2019 Argentine romantic drama film written and directed by Lucio Castro. The film stars Juan Barberini as Ocho, a man from Argentina on vacation in Barcelona, who has a casual sexual encounter with Javi (Ramón Pujol), a Spaniard from Berlin. The men soon realize that they have met before, 20 years earlier in 1999, when they were both in the closet about their sexuality and too afraid to pursue a relationship with each other. The film also stars Mía Maestro as Sonia, Javi's girlfriend at the time of the original meeting.

The film had its world premiere at the New Directors/New Films Festival on 30 March 2019. It had its Argentine premiere on 8 April at the Buenos Aires International Festival of Independent Cinema, where it won the award for Best Argentine Film. It was subsequently screened at other LGBT and general interest film festivals, and won the award for Best First Feature at the Frameline Film Festival. The film was released theatrically in Argentina on 6 February 2020 by Cine Tren.
