= Crime 101 (2026 film) =

Film by Bart Layton

- Theatrical release poster
- Directed by: Bart Layton
- Screenplay by: Bart Layton
- Based on: Crime 101 by Don Winslow
- Produced by: Tim Bevan; Eric Fellner; Derrin Schlesinger; Dimitri Doganis; Bart Layton; Shane Salerno; Chris Hemsworth; Ben Grayson
- Starring: Chris Hemsworth; Mark Ruffalo; Barry Keoghan; Monica Barbaro; Corey Hawkins; Jennifer Jason Leigh; Nick Nolte; Halle Berry
- Cinematography: Erik Wilson
- Edited by: Jacob Secher Schulsinger; Julian Hart
- Music by: Blanck Mass
- Production companies: Working Title Films; Raw; Wild State; The Story Factory
- Distributed by: Amazon MGM Studios (United States and Canada) (Note: Released through the Metro-Goldwyn-Mayer banner.); Sony Pictures Releasing International (International) (Note: excludes France (Amazon Prime Video))
- Release dates: January 28, 2026 (London); February 13, 2026 (United States and United Kingdom)
- Running time: 140 minutes
- Countries: United Kingdom; United States
- Language: English
- Budget: $90 million
- Box office: $72.9 million

Crime 101 is a 2026 crime thriller film starring Chris Hemsworth, Mark Ruffalo, Barry Keoghan, and Halle Berry. It is written and directed by Bart Layton, based on the 2020 novella by Don Winslow. The film also features Monica Barbaro, Corey Hawkins, Jennifer Jason Leigh, and Nick Nolte.

A co-production between the United States and the United Kingdom, the film premiered in London on January 28, 2026, and was released in the United States by Amazon MGM Studios and internationally by Sony Pictures Releasing International on February 13, 2026. It received positive reviews from critics but was a box-office bomb, grossing $72.9 million worldwide on a budget of $90 million.

== Plot ==
In Los Angeles, Mike is an elusive and disciplined jewel thief, carefully planning robberies to avoid violence and DNA evidence while escaping via U.S. Route 101. Intercepting a diamond delivery carrying decoys, he steals $3 million in genuine diamonds but is shaken after being grazed by an unexpected bullet. He calls off a planned robbery in Santa Barbara, but his fence, Money, enlists volatile young biker Ormon instead.

LAPD Detective Lou Lubesnick links the diamond theft to Mike's string of unsolved robberies and suggests a lone suspect is responsible, but his theory is dismissed. The lonely Mike strikes up a romance with a stranger, Maya, after she rear-ends his car. After Ormon violently carries out the Santa Barbara job, Mike cuts ties with Money, who directs Ormon to intercept Mike's next heist. Preparing another heist, Mike pays Devon, a hacker, for information on Sharon, a high-end insurance broker. Long undervalued by her firm, Sharon is further frustrated when a new colleague closes a lucrative deal with the wealthy Steven Monroe.

Mike realizes he is being tracked by Ormon, who threatens Devon into revealing that Sharon is connected to Mike's plan. Lou discovers the car Mike used in the diamond robbery, and a trace of blood inside matches Mike's juvenile record with his birth name, James. Sharon rejects Mike's attempt to recruit her as an accomplice, and Mike spots Ormon, confronting him after a high-speed chase; realizing he has been sent by Money, Mike warns Ormon to stay away. Separating from his unfaithful wife, Lou finds himself joining Sharon's yoga class.

Lou is suspended for refusing to help cover up the police shooting of another jewel thief but continues his investigation and tracks down Mike's foster mother. Denied a promotion yet again, Sharon agrees to help Mike. Demanding a $3 million share, she provides inside information on an illicit diamond purchase Monroe has arranged to make with $5.5 million in cash, for his upcoming wedding at the Beverly Wilshire Hotel. Ormon viciously interrogates Sharon, who turns to Lou for help and admits everything and quits her job after excoriating her boss. Wary of Mike's secretive nature, Maya ends their relationship after he reveals he will be leaving town.

The briefcase of diamonds arrives with a courier, and Mike takes the place of his security guard, unaware Lou is posing as the courier himself. Driving to the hotel, the two of them deliver the briefcase to Monroe and his fiancée Adrienne in the wedding suite. Mike seizes the cash at gunpoint, but Lou retrieves a gun from the case and reveals himself as a police officer. Their standoff is interrupted by Ormon, disguised as a hotel employee. Demanding the case, he shoots and wounds Monroe, but Mike kills Ormon before he can shoot Lou. Allowing Mike to escape empty-handed, Lou uses knowledge of financial crimes Monroe has committed to force Monroe and his fiancée to support his story as he frames Ormon for Mike's robberies.

Having stolen the decoy gems taken into evidence from Mike's earlier heist, Lou swaps them with real diamonds from the briefcase, which he gives to Sharon to start a new life. He discovers Mike has left him his vintage green 1968 Camaro and Mike sends Maya a childhood photo, asking her for a second chance.

== Cast ==
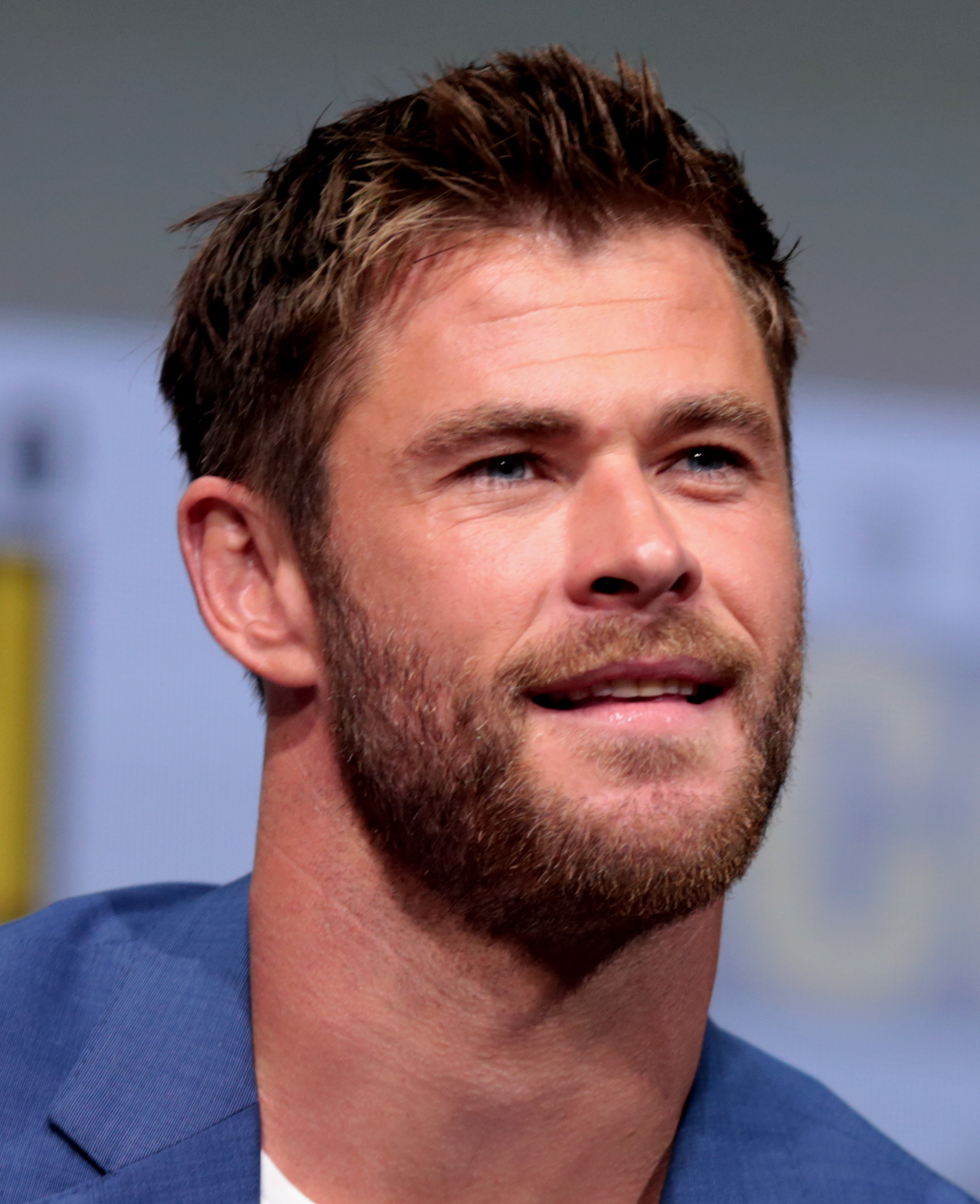
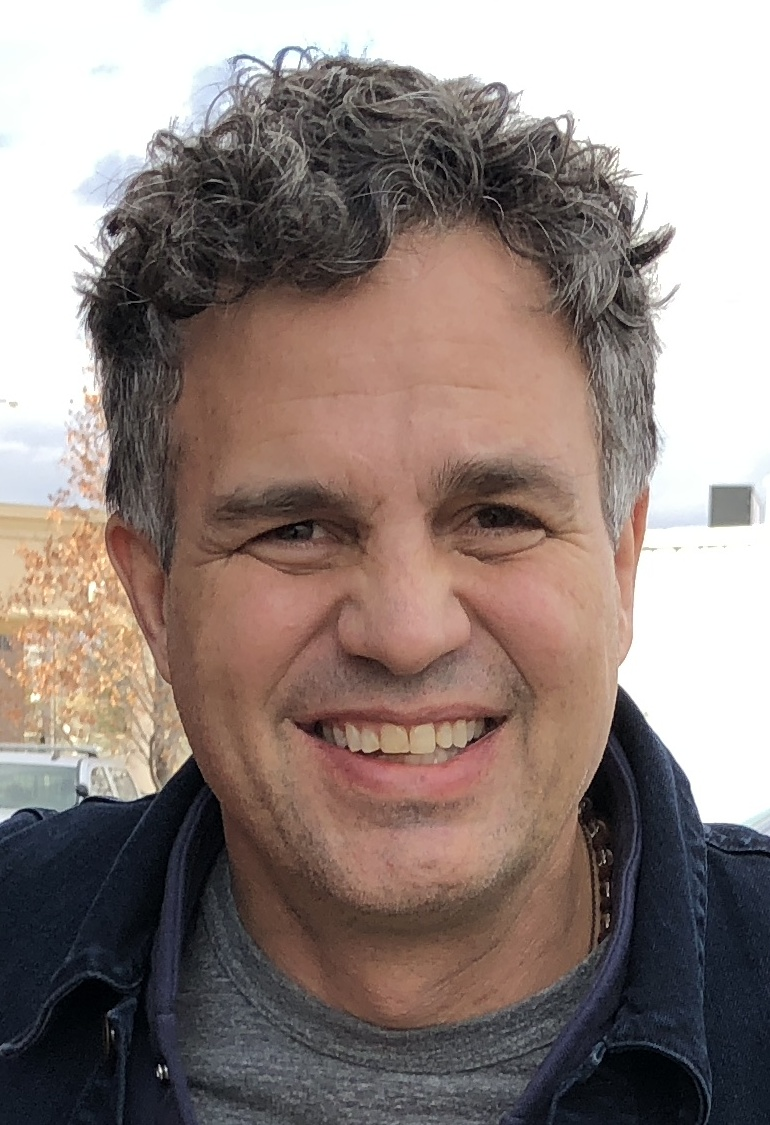
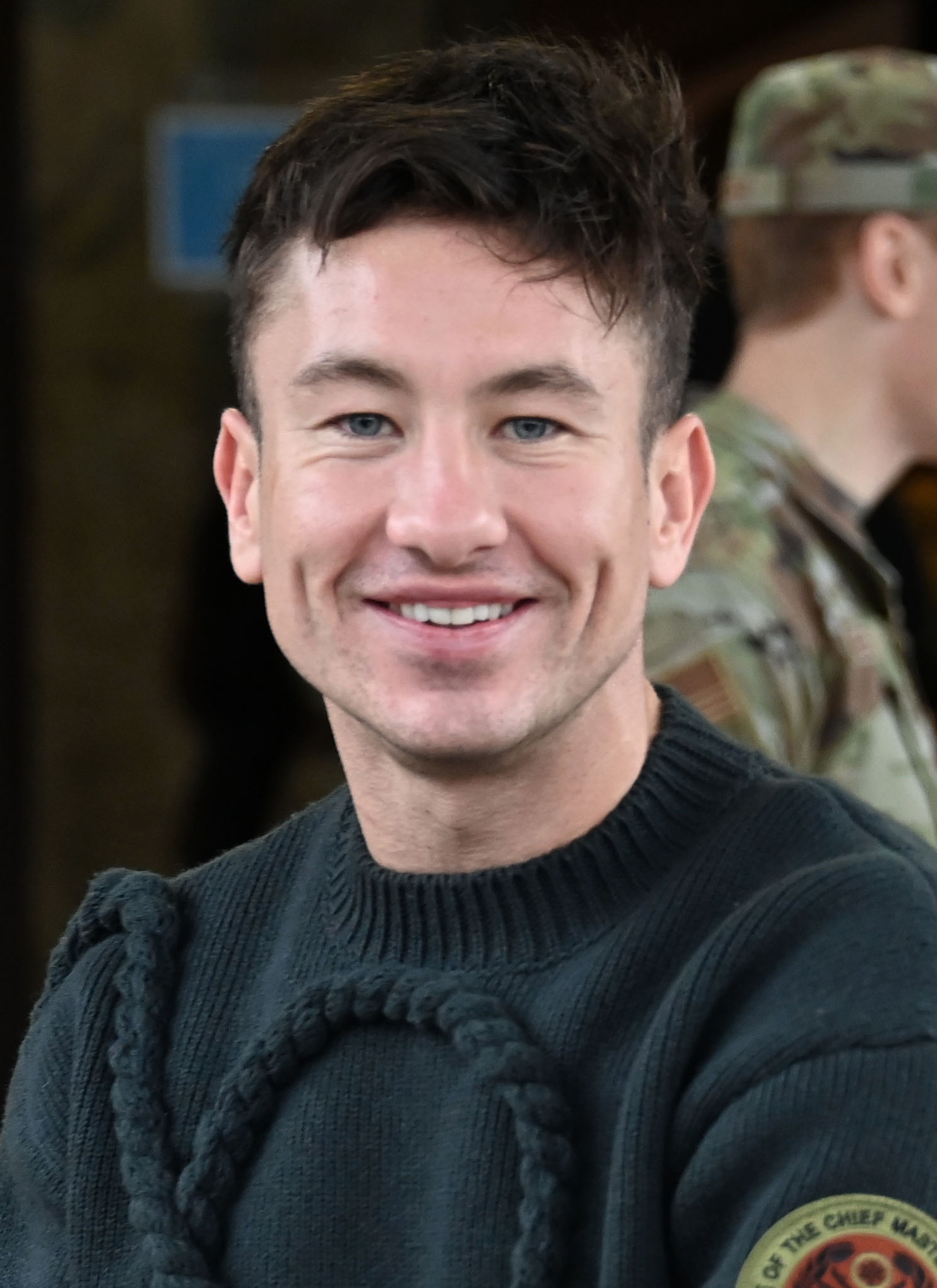
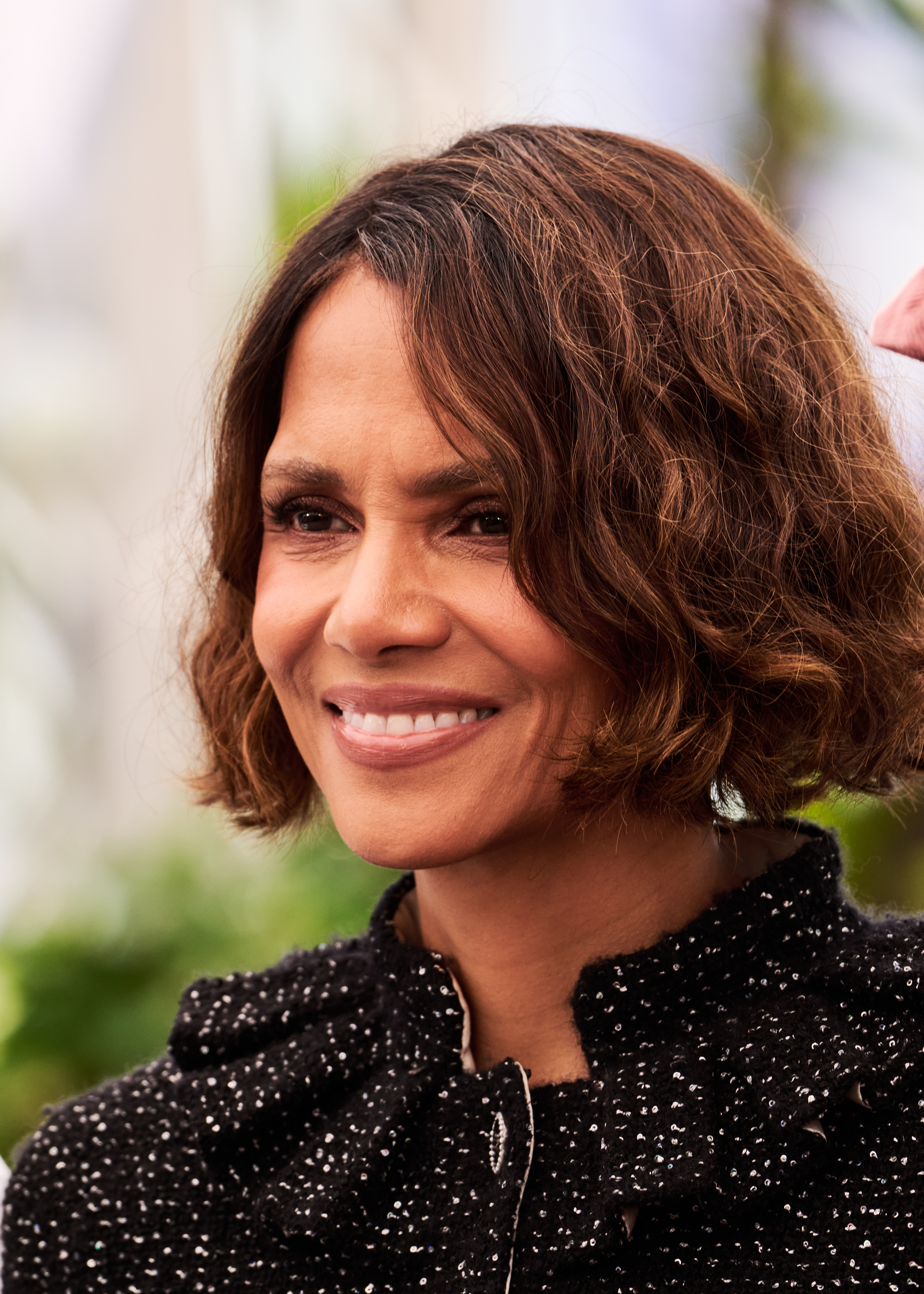
The film stars Chris Hemsworth, Mark Ruffalo, Barry Keoghan and Halle Berry.
- Chris Hemsworth as Mike/James Davis, a Los Angeles jewel thief
- Mark Ruffalo as Det. Lou Lubesnick, a detective tracking Mike
- Barry Keoghan as Ormon, a psychotic, violent young biker
- Halle Berry as Sharon Combs, an insurance broker who teams up with Mike
- Monica Barbaro as Maya, Mike's love interest
- Corey Hawkins as Det. Tillman, Lou's partner
- Jennifer Jason Leigh as Angie Lubesnick, Lou's estranged wife
- Nick Nolte as Money, a well-connected but unpredictable underworld fence
- Tate Donovan as Steven Monroe, a wealthy client of Sharon's
- Devon Bostick as Devon, a hacker
- Payman Maadi as Sammy Kassem
- Babak Tafti as Ali
- Deborah Hedwall as Anne
- Paul Adelstein as Mark
- Drew Powell as Det. Townsend
- Matthew Del Negro as Police Captain Stewart
- John Schwab as Foster
- Andra Nechita as Adrienne
- John Douglas as Grant

== Production ==
In August 2023, it was announced that Amazon Studios (later renamed to Amazon MGM Studios) would distribute Crime 101, a film adaptation of the Don Winslow novella of the same name, beating out Netflix with a nearly $90 million offer; Pedro Pascal and Chris Hemsworth would star and Bart Layton would direct. In May 2024, Mark Ruffalo replaced Pascal (who departed due to "scheduling conflicts") and Barry Keoghan was also cast. In October, Halle Berry, Corey Hawkins and Monica Barbaro joined the cast in undisclosed roles. In November, Jennifer Jason Leigh, Nick Nolte, Tate Donovan, Babak Tafti, Payman Maadi, Deborah Hedwall, Devon Bostick, Paul Adelstein, Drew Powell and Matthew Del Negro rounded out the cast.

Principal photography began in October 2024, in Los Angeles. Jacob Secher Schulsinger served as the editor, while Blanck Mass composed the score.

== Release ==
Crime 101 premiered on January 28, 2026, in London and was released in the United States on February 13, 2026, after initially being set for January 23. The film streamed on Amazon Prime Video on April 1, 2026, and it was released on DVD, Blu-ray and Ultra HD Blu-ray on June 30 by Alliance Entertainment and MGM Home Entertainment.

== Reception ==
=== Box office ===
Crime 101 grossed $37 million in the United States and Canada, and $36 million in other territories, for a worldwide total of $72 million.

In the United States and Canada, Crime 101 was released alongside Wuthering Heights; Good Luck, Have Fun, Don't Die; and Goat, and was projected to gross $15–17 million from 3,161 theaters in its four-day opening weekend. The film grossed $3.9 million on its first day, and went on to debut to $14.3 million (and $16 million over the four days), finishing third behind Wuthering Heights and Goat. In its second weekend the film made $5.8 million, finishing in fourth.

=== Critical response ===
On the review aggregator website Rotten Tomatoes, 88% of 193 critics' reviews are positive, with an average rating of 7.1/10. The website's consensus reads: "Crime 101 has studied the greats of L.A. Noir closely and shows its homework with sleek action set pieces and vivid characterizations, receiving top marks and graduating near the top of its class." Metacritic, which uses a weighted average, assigned the film a score of 68 out of 100, based on 37 critics, indicating "generally favorable" reviews. Audiences polled by CinemaScore gave the film an average grade of "B" on an A+ to F scale.
