= 1st Night =

- Directed by: Christopher Menaul
- Starring: Richard E. Grant; Sarah Brightman; Mia Maestro; Julian Ovenden
- Release dates: June 2010 (London UK Film Focus); May 3, 2013 (United States)
- Running time: 116 minutes

1st Night is a 2010 opera themed comedy film directed by Christopher Menaul and starring Richard E. Grant, Sarah Brightman, Mia Maestro, and Julian Ovenden.

== Plot ==
1st Night is about a rich industrialist Adam (Richard E. Grant), who aspires to a more cultured world. Spurred on by playful jibes that he is little more than a city suit living the capitalist's dream, this frustrated amateur opera singer decides to throw an opera (Mozart's Così fan tutte) in his lavish country retreat. Once his friends see him belting out the notes, he feels sure it will spell the end to their shallow taunts. In fact, it might even help him win the hand of Celia (Sarah Brightman), the female conductor he has been pursuing whom - it just so happens - is the first to be recruited for his showpiece.

== Cast ==
- Mia Maestro as Nicoletta Lampedusa / Fiordiligi
- Stanley Townsend as Paulo Prodi
- Oliver Dimsdale as Philip Ford / Director
- Julian Ovenden as Tom Chambers / Ferrando
- Sarah Brightman as Celia / Conductor
- Jane Howe as Audrey
- Tessa Peake-Jones as Mrs, Hammond
- KLAUS as Baskerville (dog)
- Emma Williams as Tamsin Ford / Dorabella
- Jack Walker as Eric Hammond
- Nigel Lindsay as Martin Mays / Guglielmo
- Richard E. Grant as Sir Adam Drummond / Don Alfonso
- Laura Power as Stella / Stage Manager
- Hugh Ross as Bunny / Costumes
- Andrew Massey as Nathan / Rehearsal Pianist (credited as Andy Massey)
- Susannah Fielding as Debbie Drew / Despina
- Alfie Boe (voice) as Ferrando/Julian Ovenden's singing voice
