= All Jacked Up and Full of Worms =

- Directed by: Alex Phillips
- Written by: Alex Phillips
- Starring: Trevor Dawkins; Phillip Andre Botello; Betsey Brown; Eva Fellows; Mike Lopez; Carol Rhyu
- Production companies: Special Movies; Eleven04 Productions; Full Spectrum Features
- Distributed by: Cinedigm
- Release date: July 16, 2022 (Fantasia International Film Festival)
- Running time: 72 minutes
- Country: United States
- Language: English

All Jacked Up and Full of Worms is a 2022 American horror film directed by Alex Phillips, starring Trevor Dawkins, Phillip Andre Botello, and Betsey Brown.

== Cast ==
- Phillip Andre Botello as Roscoe
- Trevor Dawkins as Benny
- Betsey Brown as Samantha
- Mike Lopez as Biff
- Eva Fellows as Henrietta
- Carol Rhyu
- Noah Lepawsky as Jared
- Sammy Arechar as Dennis

== Production ==
The film originated as a 20-page play that Phillips wrote in 2016 while working as a PA on other film sets. When discussing the thematic inspiration for the film, Phillips said: "To put it simply, I wanted to talk about a yearning for normalcy and a 'regular life,' but also feeling totally broken and too fucked up to deserve that sort of thing."

== Release ==
The film premiered at the Fantasia International Film Festival on 16 July 2022. It is also part of Fantastic Fest's Burnt Ends 2022 showcase.

== Reception ==
Mary Beth McAndrews of Dread Central rated the film 3.5 stars out of 5, writing "Transgressive, upsetting, and disturbing, ‘All Jacked Up And Full Of Worms’ is a slippery nightmare that tries a little too hard to be disgusting." The film received positive reviews in ScreenAnarchy and RogerEbert.com.

Simon Rother of HorrorNews.net was more critical of the film, giving it a score of 4/10.
