= Monica Barbaro =

American actress (born 1989)

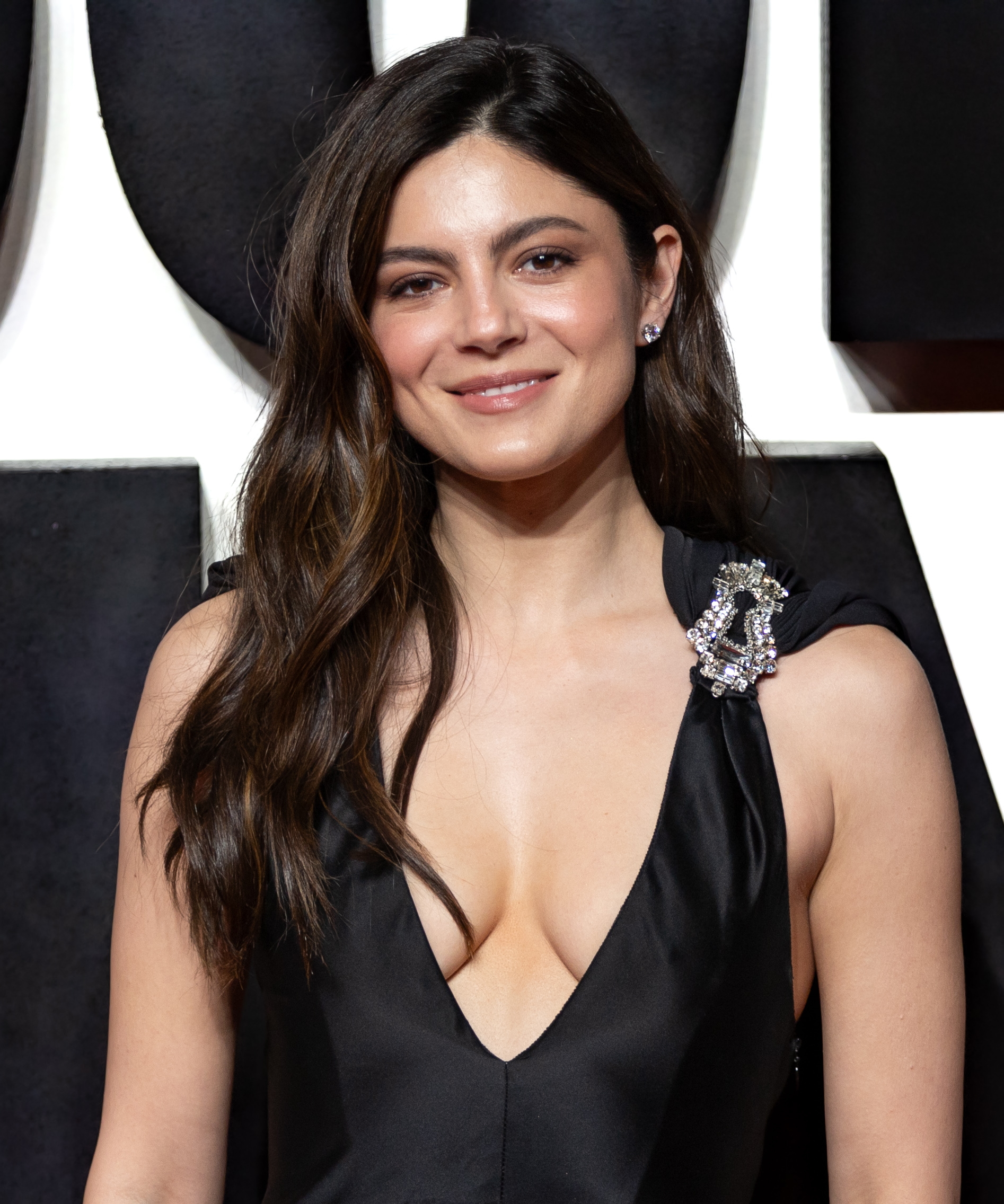
- Barbaro at the London premiere of A Complete Unknown in 2025
- Born: Monica Maria Barbaro; June 17, 1989 (age 37); San Francisco, California, U.S.
- Education: New York University (BFA)
- Occupation: Actress
- Years active: 2012–present

Monica Maria Barbaro (/ˈbɑːrbəroʊ/; born June 17, 1989) is an American actress. Known for her work on stage and screen, her accolades include nominations for an Academy Award and an Actor Award.

She started her career in television, taking supporting roles in Unreal (2016), Chicago P.D. (2016–2017), Chicago Justice (2017), The Good Cop (2018), and Splitting Up Together (2018–2019) with a leading role in the Netflix action comedy series FUBAR (2023–2025)

Barbaro made her feature film debut in the independent film The Cathedral (2021). She portrayed Joan Baez in the Bob Dylan-biopic A Complete Unknown (2024) earning a nomination for the Academy Award for Best Supporting Actress. She has also acted in the action films Top Gun: Maverick (2022) and Crime 101 (2026) as well as the romantic comedies At Midnight (2023) and One Night Only (2026).

On stage, she acted in the West End revival of the Christopher Hampton play Les Liaisons Dangereuses (2025) at the Royal National Theatre.

== Early life ==
Barbaro was born on June 17, 1989, to Heidi (née Wagner) and Nicholas Barbaro. She has a sister, Eva, and a brother, Michael. Barbaro's father is Italian American, and her mother is of Mexican, German, and Nicaraguan descent. Her parents divorced when she was a child. Barbaro was born in San Francisco and grew up in Mill Valley, California, where she graduated from Tamalpais High School in 2007.

Barbaro started dancing at an early age and went on to study ballet. While taking electives in acting, she completed a degree in dance at New York University's Tisch School of the Arts in New York City.

After graduating in 2010, she decided to pursue acting and returned to San Francisco. There, she booked a commercial and a short film, connected with an agent, and attended the Beverly Hills Playhouse acting school.

== Career ==
=== 2013–2021: Rise to prominence ===
Barbaro gained attention in 2013 for her lead role in It's Not About the Nail, a viral comedy short about communication in a marriage. Her first major television role was portraying the character of Yael on the second season of the Lifetime television series UnREAL. Following UnREAL, Barbaro joined the cast of NBC legal drama Chicago Justice, an entry in Dick Wolf's Chicago franchise, in which she portrayed Anna Valdez. In 2018, Barbaro also played Cora Vasquez on Netflix's The Good Cop, alongside Josh Groban and Tony Danza. Between 2018 and 2019, Barbaro had a recurring part in the ABC sitcom Splitting Up Together.

=== 2022–2025: Career breakthrough ===
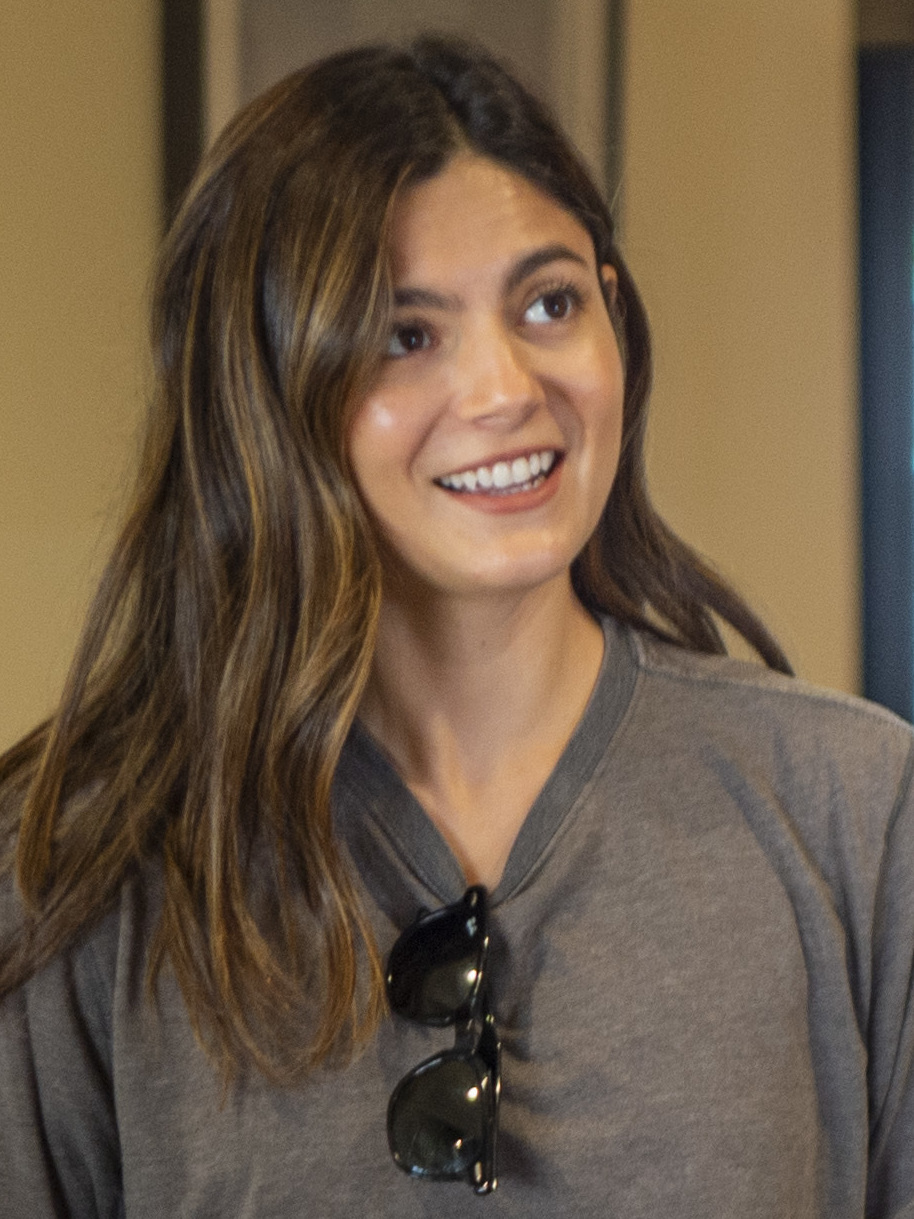
Barbaro during Fleet Week San Francisco in 2022, around the time Top Gun: Maverick released

In the 2022 blockbuster Top Gun: Maverick starring Tom Cruise, Barbaro portrayed naval aviator Lieutenant Natasha "Phoenix" Trace. The film was a critical and financial success and went on to earn a nomination for the Academy Award for Best Picture. The following year, Barbaro starred in the romantic comedy At Midnight (2023). The film received mixed reviews for its story but Barbaro earned acclaim for her performance. San Francisco Chronicle declared "Barbaro...proves with seemingly effortless charm that she can carry a rom-com". Barbaro, a professional dancer, was able to lend her talents in a scene that involved the two leads dancing a combination of salsa and the tango.

From 2023 to 2025 she starred in the Netflix action comedy series FUBAR alongside Arnold Schwarzenegger. In 2024, she played activist and folk singer Joan Baez in the James Mangold-directed Bob Dylan biopic A Complete Unknown, starring Timothée Chalamet. Barbaro took singing and guitar lessons to prepare for this role. David Rooney of The Hollywood Reporter praised her performance writing, "Barbaro sings like an angel, her voice rich, clear and expressive. She gives the character the radiant self-possession of a woman who never loses sight of who she is". He also cited her and Chalamet's duets in the film as being the "standout musical moments". For her performance, she received multiple accolades, including nominations for the Academy Award for Best Supporting Actress and the Screen Actors Guild Award for Outstanding Performance by a Female Actor in a Supporting Role.

She was included in Time magazine's Time 100 Next list in 2025.

=== 2026–present ===
Barbaro made her stage debut in 2026 acting in a West End revival of the French play Les Liaisons dangereuses at the National Theatre. She starred opposite Lesley Manville and Aidan Turner, with direction by Marianne Elliott. Dominic Maxwell of The Times noted Barbaro's "flawless English voice" and added that her performance is "one of the evening’s hits".

That same year she starred in the romantic comedy One Night Only opposite Callum Turner. Also in 2026, she is set to portray Mira Murati in the Luca Guadagnino directed biographical drama Artificial starring alongside Andrew Garfield as Sam Altman. In June 2026, she was cast in the Untitled Ocean's Eleven prequel opposite Margot Robbie and Bradley Cooper.

== Personal life ==
Since early 2025, Barbaro has been in a relationship with actor Andrew Garfield.

== Acting credits ==
=== Film ===
Key
†	Denotes films that have not yet been released

Year	Title	Role	Notes	Ref.
2013	Bullish	Eva		
2021	The Cathedral	Lydia Damrosch		
2022	Top Gun: Maverick	Natasha "Phoenix" Trace		
2022	I'm Charlie Walker	Peggy		
2023	At Midnight	Sophie Wilder		
2024	A Complete Unknown	Joan Baez	Also performed 7 songs for its soundtrack	
2026	Crime 101	Maya		
2026	One Night Only	Allie		
2026	Artificial	Mira Murati		
2027	Untitled Ocean's Eleven prequel †		Filming	

=== Television ===
Year	Title	Role	Notes	Ref.
2015	Stitchers	Brenda 'Bentley' Miller	Episode: "The Root of All Evil"	
2016	Hawaii Five-0	Ella Koha	Episode: "Ke Koa Lokomaika'i"	
2016	Cooper Barrett's Guide to Surviving Life	Attractive Girl	Episode "How to Survive Working with Friends"	
2016	Unreal	Yael	Main role (season 2), 10 episodes	
2016	Notorious	Chloe Edwards	Episode: "Tell Me a Secret"	
2016–2017	Chicago P.D.	Assistant State's Attorney Anna Valdez	4 episodes	
2017	Chicago Justice	Assistant State's Attorney Anna Valdez	Main role	
2017	Lethal Weapon	Nora Cooper	Episode: "Flight Risk"	
2018	The Good Cop	Cora Vasquez	Main role	
2018–2019	Splitting Up Together	Lisa Apple	Recurring role	
2019	Stumptown	Liz Melero	4 episodes	
2023–2025	FUBAR	Emma Brunner	Main role	

=== Theater ===
Year	Title	Role	Venue	Ref.
2026	Les Liaisons Dangereuses	Madame de Tourvel	Lyttelton Theatre, Royal National Theatre	

=== Video games ===
Year	Title	Role	Notes	Ref.
2023	Forspoken	Auden Keen	Voice role	

== Discography ==
Soundtrack albums

List of soundtrack albums, with selected chart positions
Title	Album details	Peak chart positions				
Title	Album details	US Sales	US Sound.	UK Amer.	UK Comp.	UK Sound.
A Complete Unknown (Original Motion Picture Soundtrack)	Released: December 20, 2024; Label: Columbia; Formats: CD, vinyl, digital download, streaming	44	17	5	11	3

Songs

List of non-single appearances
Title	Year	Other artist(s)	Album
"Girl from the North Country"	2024	Timothée Chalamet	A Complete Unknown
"Don't Think Twice, It's All Right"	2024	Timothée Chalamet	A Complete Unknown
"Blowin' in the Wind"	2024	Timothée Chalamet	A Complete Unknown
"It Ain't Me Babe"	2024	Timothée Chalamet	A Complete Unknown
"Silver Dagger"	2024	—N/a	A Complete Unknown
"The House of the Rising Sun"	2024	—N/a	A Complete Unknown
"There but for Fortune"	2024	—N/a	A Complete Unknown

== Awards and nominations ==
Year	Awards	Category	Nominated work	Result	Ref.
2024	Academy Awards	Best Supporting Actress	A Complete Unknown	Nominated	
2024	Actor Awards	Outstanding Performance by a Female Actor in a Supporting Role	A Complete Unknown	Nominated	
2024	Actor Awards	Outstanding Cast in a Motion Picture	A Complete Unknown	Nominated	
2024	The Astra Awards	Breakthrough Award	A Complete Unknown	Won	
2024	AARP Movies for Grownups Awards	Best Ensemble	A Complete Unknown	Nominated	
2024	Dallas–Fort Worth Film Critics Association	Best Supporting Actress	A Complete Unknown	5th place	
2024	Phoenix Film Critics Circle	Best Supporting Actress	A Complete Unknown	Nominated	
2024	St. Louis Film Critics Association	Best Supporting Actress	A Complete Unknown	Nominated	
2024	Vancouver Film Critics Circle	Best Supporting Actress	A Complete Unknown	Nominated	
