= Lucio Castro =

Filmmaker and fashion designer (born 1975)

- Born: Buenos Aires, Argentina
- Education: University of Buenos Aires; Parsons School of Design
- Occupation: Film director

Lucio Castro (born December 11, 1975) is a film director and fashion designer born in Argentina and based in New York City.

== Early life and education ==
Castro was born in Buenos Aires on December 11th, 1975; his family had immigrated to Argentina in the 1930s. His mother was a Spanish telenovela actress and his father was a nuclear physicist. He graduated from the University of Buenos Aires in 1999 with a film degree and later attended Parsons School of Design.

== Career ==
=== Fashion ===
Castro worked for Marc Jacobs, Armani Exchange, and DKNY Jeans before founding his own fashion label in 2011.

=== Film ===
After directing a series of short films throughout the 2000s and 2010s, his first feature film, End of the Century, premiered at the New Directors/New Films Festival at the Museum of Modern Art. His second feature film, After This Death, had its world premiere at the 75th Berlin International Film Festival in 2025. His third feature film Drunken Noodles is slated to debut at the ACID parallel section of the 2025 Cannes Film Festival on May 18, 2025.

== Personal life ==
Castro is gay.

== Filmography ==
Key
†	Denotes films that have not yet been released

Year	Title	Director	Writer	Producer	Ref.
2019	End of the Century	Yes	Yes	No	
2025	After This Death	Yes	Yes	Executive	
2025	Drunken Noodles	Yes	Yes	Yes	
