= Lucy Schulman =

- Directed by: Ellie Sachs
- Written by: Ellie Sachs
- Produced by: Fernando Loureiro; Guilherme Coelho; Morwin Schmookler; Gabriel Amaral
- Starring: Ellie Sachs; David Cross; Thomas Mann; Hasan Minhaj; Annabelle Attanasio; Chelsea Frei; Sandrine Holt; Eisa Davis; Olivia Luccardi; Joanna Arnow; Stephen Adly Guirgis; Will Janowitz; Dan Perlman; Devon Walker; Kareem Rahma
- Cinematography: Barton Cortright
- Edited by: Kate Pedatella; Henry Hayes
- Music by: Giosuè Greco
- Production company: Tigresa
- Distributed by: Aero Films
- Release dates: June 5, 2026 (Tribeca Festival); 2027 (United States)
- Running time: 94 minutes
- Country: United States
- Language: English

Lucy Schulman is a 2026 American romantic comedy film written and directed by Ellie Sachs. Sachs stars alongside David Cross, Thomas Mann, Hasan Minhaj, Annabelle Attanasio, Chelsea Frei, Sandrine Holt, Eisa Davis, Olivia Luccardi, Joanna Arnow, Stephen Adly Guirgis, Will Janowitz, Dan Perlman, Devon Walker, and Kareem Rahma.

The film premiered at the Tribeca Festival on June 5, 2026. It is scheduled to be released in the United States in 2027.

== Premise ==
After a crushing breakup, Lucy moves back in with her eccentric single dad and dives into bad dates, false starts, and growing pains.

== Cast ==
- Ellie Sachs as Lucy Schulman
- David Cross
- Thomas Mann
- Hasan Minhaj
- Annabelle Attanasio
- Chelsea Frei
- Sandrine Holt
- Eisa Davis
- Olivia Luccardi
- Joanna Arnow
- Stephen Adly Guirgis
- Will Janowitz
- Dan Perlman
- Devon Walker
- Kareem Rahma
- Tuffy Questell
- Henry Hall

== Production ==
Principal photography had been completed in July 2025 in New York City, on a romantic comedy film titled Lucy Schulman by filmmaker Ellie Sachs. It starred Sachs alongside David Cross, Thomas Mann, Hasan Minhaj, Annabelle Attanasio, Chelsea Frei, Sandrine Holt, Eisa Davis, Olivia Luccardi, Joanna Arnow, Stephen Adly Guirgis, Will Janowitz, Devon Walker, Kareem Rahma, Tuffy Questell, and Henry Hall. In April 2026, the film was selected to screen at the Tribeca Festival.

== Release ==
Lucy Schulman premiered at the Tribeca Festival on June 5, 2026.

It is expected to be theatrical released in early 2027 by Aero Films.
