= Mía Maestro =

Argentine actress and singer (born 1978)

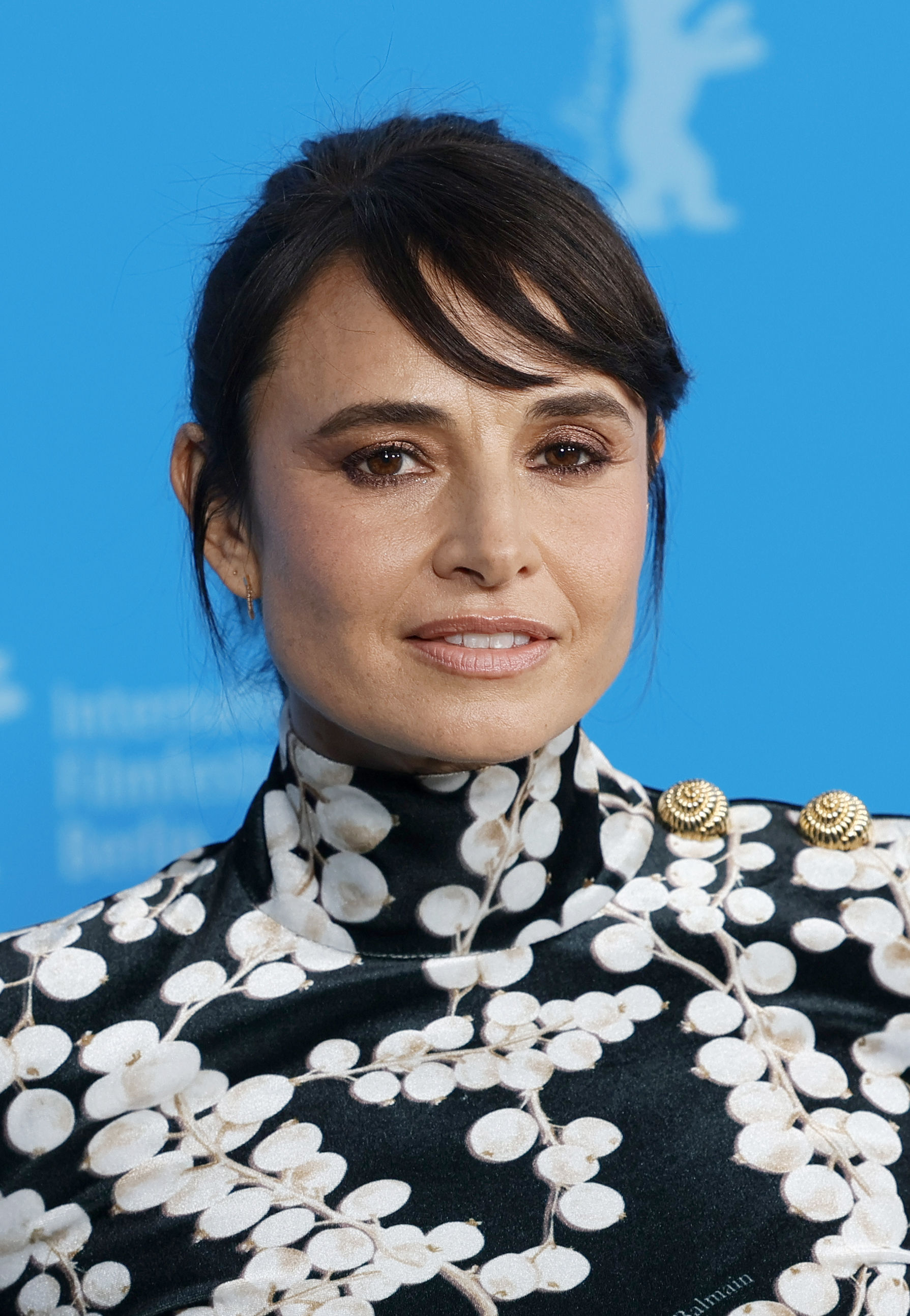
- Maestro at the 2025 Berlinale
- Born: 19 June 1978 (age 48); Buenos Aires, Argentina
- Occupations: Actress, singer
- Years active: 1998–present

Mía Maestro (born 19 June 1978) is an Argentine actress and singer. She is known for her roles as Nora Martinez on The Strain, as Nadia Santos on the television drama Alias, as Cristina Kahlo in Frida, as Chichina Ferreyra in The Motorcycle Diaries, and as Carmen in The Twilight Saga.

== Early life and career ==
Maestro was born in Buenos Aires, on 19 June 1978. She made her screen debut in Carlos Saura’s Tango, which received Golden Globe and Academy Award nominations for Best Foreign Film. Initially trained in Argentina, Maestro traveled to Berlin to develop a vocal repertoire of the works of Kurt Weill and Hanns Eisler. Her first proper acting turn was in the play The Summer Trilogy by Carlo Goldoni, and by 1998, she secured the coveted role of Lulu in Frank Wedekind’s Pandora's Box at the San Martin Theater in her hometown of Buenos Aires. For this she garnered an "Ace" Award for Best New Artist of the Year.

In 2004, she joined the cast of ABC's critically acclaimed series Alias for two seasons. In the same year, Maestro also appeared in the Argentine film La Niña Santa (aka The Holy Girl), directed by Lucrecia Martel, as well as the Focus Features film The Motorcycle Diaries, alongside Gael Garcia Bernal, (Golden Globe nominee in 2005 for Best Foreign Film) based on the journals of Che Guevara, leader of the Cuban Revolution. Maestro has starred as a victim of a kidnapping in Venezuela in Jonathan Jakubowicz’s thriller Secuestro Express, released by Miramax. In December 2005, she starred in Prince's music video for "Te Amo Corazón", which was directed by their mutual friend Salma Hayek.

In 2006, she co-starred in Wolfgang Petersen's film Poseidon. where she played Elena Gonzalaz, a stowaway girl going to meet her sick brother in the hospital with friend and waiter Valentine. Maestro starred in the off-Broadway musical play, My Life as a Fairytale, inspired by the life and works of author Hans Christian Andersen and singing the music of Stephin Merritt from The Magnetic Fields. She also starred in 1st Night, based on the opera Così fan tutte by Mozart, the comedy Meant to Be, and the American indie film The Music Never Stopped, based on an Oliver Sacks story.

Maestro has been cast as the lead character in Cutthroat, an ABC television pilot for the 2010–2011 season. As of 30 September 2010, she has been cast as Carmen of the Denali Coven in The Twilight Saga: Breaking Dawn – Part 1 and Part 2. Maestro guest-starred in White Collar, as Maya, a restaurant owner, with whom Neal Caffrey (Matt Bomer) has a fling while on the run.

She played Dr. Nora Martinez in the vampire horror series The Strain, created by Guillermo del Toro. She also guest starred in the NBC television series Hannibal in 2015, playing the role of Allegra Pazzi, the wife of an Italian inspector. In 2017, she returned to theater and played the role of Diana Salazar in Ferdinand von Schirach's Terror. The play was produced in multiple countries, an adapted version of the play had its United States premiere in a production by Miami New Drama at Miami Beach's Colony Theatre.

In 2019, she starred as Sonia in the critically-acclaimed indie drama End of the Century. Maestro starred in the lead role of Magdalena in the magical realist film The Cow Who Sang a Song Into the Future (2022), directed by Francisca Alegria. The film premiered and competed for Grand Jury Prize at Sundance Film Festival. In August 2022, it has been announced that Maestro is cast as the lead role opposite James Franco in the biopic Alina of Cuba, about Fidel Castro and his daughter Alina Fernández. Maestro is set to portray Natalia Revuelta Clews, Castro's lover and the mother of Alina. Maestro starred in the independent film, Grassland which was directed by Common and released at the Los Angeles Latino International Film Festival on June 2, 2024.

=== Musical career ===
As a singer-songwriter, Maestro has been performing in Los Angeles, New York City, and Buenos Aires, and is in preparation to start recording her EP followed by an album. In 2010, she performed in Iceland where she opened for Emiliana Torrini during several shows at the Háskólabíó theater in Reykjavík. She has collaborated with the UK band Faithless, singing on the song "Love is My Condition" on their album The Dance, released in May 2010.

Maestro's version of "Lloverá" appeared on the Twilight: Breaking Dawn – Part 1 soundtrack, also as part of an EP titled Blue Eyed Sailor, released in November 2012. The EP features three songs: "Blue Eyed Sailor", "Time to Go" (featuring Damien Rice) and "Lloverá". It also features a music video of "Blue Eyed Sailor", directed by Juan Azulay and Guillermo Navarro, inspired by the art of Cecilia Paredes.

On 7 October 2014, Mia Maestro's debut album Si Agua was released by Arts & Crafts. It was recorded in Iceland. NPR's Alt.Latino referred to her voice as one of Alt.Latino's favorites of 2014.

== Awards ==
She won an ACE Award for her performance in the stage production of Pandora's Box. For her work in Alias, she won the Imagen Award for Best Supporting Actress in Television. In 2019, she has been awarded an honorable mention Grand Jury Award by Outfest for her performance in End of the Century, shared with her co-stars Juan Barberini and Ramon Pujol.

== Filmography ==
=== Films ===
Year	Title	Role	Notes
1998	Tango	Elena Flores	
1999	The Venice Project	Danilla	
2000	Timecode	Ana Pauls	
2000	Picking Up the Pieces	Carla	
2000	El astillero	Mujer	
2001	Hotel	Cariola	
2002	Frida	Cristina Kahlo	Choreographer: Tango
2003	Four Lean Hounds	Kay	Short film
2004	The Motorcycle Diaries	Chichina Ferreyra	
2004	The Holy Girl	Inés	
2005	Kept and Dreamless	Celina	
2005	Deepwater	Iris	
2005	Secuestro Express	Carla	
2006	Poseidon	Elena Morales	
2007	The Box	Sasha Eccles	
2008	Visioneers	Charisma	
2010	Meant to Be	Gigi	
2010	1st Night	Nicoletta	
2010	Water and Salt	Micaela	
2011	The Music Never Stopped	Celia	
2011	The Speed of Thought	Anna Manheim	
2011	It Goes Without Saying	Joan	Short film
2011	The Twilight Saga: Breaking Dawn – Part 1	Carmen Denali	
2012	The Twilight Saga: Breaking Dawn – Part 2	Carmen Denali	
2012	Savages	Dolores	
2013	Some Girl(s)	Tyler	
2014	Grand Street	Antonia	
2019	End of the Century (Fin de siglo)	Sonia	
2020	The Binding (Il Legame)	Emma	
2022	The Cow Who Sang a Song Into the Future	Magdalena	
2024	Grassland	Sofia	
2025	After This Death	Isabel	
2026	Baton	TBA	Post-production

=== Television ===
Year	Title	Role	Notes
2000	For Love or Country: The Arturo Sandoval Story	Marianela	TV movie
2001	In the Time of the Butterflies	Maria Teresa	TV movie
2004–2006	Alias	Nadia Santos	Guest (Season 3); Main cast (Season 4); Special guest (Season 5): 31 episodes
2005	Family Guy	Loka	1 episode; Voice role
2006	The Ten Commandments	Zipporah	TV movie
2007	The Man	Dr. Lola Fiero	TV movie
2008	The Summit	Maria Puerto	2 episodes; Miniseries
2008–2009	Crusoe	Olivia	7 episodes
2010	Cutthroat	Nina Cabrera	TV movie
2012	White Collar	Maya	2 episodes
2013	Person of Interest	Mira Dobrica	1 episode
2014–2015	The Strain	Dr. Nora Martinez	Main cast (Season 1–2): 26 episodes
2015	Hannibal	Allegra Pazzi	Episode: "Contorno"
2015	Scandal	Elise Martin	3 episodes
2018	Nashville	Rosa	2 episodes
2019–2021	Mayans M.C.	Sederica Palomo	9 episodes
2021	Rise and Shine, Benedict Stone	Emilia	TV movie
2023	Extrapolations	Mariama Cruz	1 episode

=== Theater ===
Year	Title	Role	Notes
2005	My Life as a Fairytale	The Little Mermaid	Off-Broadway Revival
2017	Terror	Diana Salazar	Colony Theatre

== Discography ==
=== Studio albums ===
Title	Album details
Si Agua	Released: October 7, 2014; Label: Nacional Records; Formats: Digital download
