= Www.RachelOrmont.com =

www.RachelOrmont.com
- Directed by: Peter Vack
- Written by: Peter Vack
- Produced by: Ron Farrar Brown; Curtis Everett Pawley; KJ Rothweiler; Rebekah Sherman-Myntti; Rachel Walden
- Starring: Betsey Brown; Chloe Cherry; Dasha Nekrasova
- Cinematography: Barton Cortright
- Edited by: Brad Turner
- Music by: Eli Keszler
- Production companies: The Ion Project; Gummy Films; Simone Films; Fast Rainbow Films
- Release dates: July 25, 2024 (San Francisco); October 14, 2024 (Sydney)
- Running time: 83 minutes
- Country: United States
- Language: English

www.RachelOrmont.com is a 2024 American experimental science-fiction drama film directed by Peter Vack. It is his second feature film and stars Betsey Brown, Chloe Cherry, and Dasha Nekrasova.

It tells the story of the coming of age of a woman who is raised as a slave by a massive entertainment conglomerate which controls all online content, and premiered July 7, 2025 at the San Francisco Jewish Film Festival.

== Plot ==
In a dystopian alternate 1991, media conglomerate North American Assessment and Advertising Agency (NAAAAA) accepts the sale of human beings into slavery as test subjects for the entertainment industry. A disaffected woman named Rachel sells her four month old infant, also named Rachel, to the company, and is subsequently accepted as an employee herself.

Thirty-one years later, the senior Rachel has been cloned six times as the pop star Mommy and the junior Rachel has grown into a childlike, severely developmentally stunted artificial fan of Mommy 6.0's concerts and public persona, her entire life controlled by the company. Aside from the anonymous NAAAAA employees who clean her cell twice a year, Rachel has had no physical human contact her entire life, as her only social connection is a glitchy AI chatbot called Poorspigga, and thus she has no conception of the difference between human physicality and figures on a screen. She starts developing muddled tentative sexual feelings for Mommy 6.0, barely understanding the maternal connection between the two, and begins acting out in company review sessions. Subsequently, NAAAAA promotes her to a product reviewer to take advantage of her burgeoning sexual awakening. She wakes up dressed in a motion capture suit, housed in a green screen studio, and is forced to constantly demonstrate the use of a wand vibrator branded with political slogans for the entertainment of a baying online audience of commentators and consumers. While Rachel initially enjoys the masturbation, the constant use of the wand quickly becomes painful and dehumanizing, and she begs for it to stop.

NAAAAA promotes her once again, this time to a content creator in a small office-like cell, as the artificial younger daughter of a performative family of livestreamers, the Ormonts. While she connects with the kindly parents, a long-married actor couple who play up their marital discord for the audience, she finds herself confused and overwhelmed by her "sibling," Darci Ormont, who is another NAAAAA celebrity. Darci is an abrasive and controlling political commentator who hosts a wildly popular Traditionalist Catholicism-themed show where sexual impropriety is displayed for pornographic consumption, and subsequently punished. Rachel tries her hand at creating her own show, but is not very successful. Her only serious fan is a strange woman who messages her interrogative questions about her political identity. NAAAAA announces a contest to meet Mommy 6.0, Rachel's wildest dream, and she subsequently seems to win the opportunity only to discover it is a cruel prank by Darci, who was posing as her friend to gather data. Rachel is turned into an embarrassing laughingstock by the internet audience, and breaks down yet again.

Unable to fulfill any role at the company, Rachel is dumped on the street outside NAAAAA's headquarters in Manhattan's Union Square. She is told she cannot apply to go back inside for another six months. Rachel is overwhelmed by the enormity of being in the physical world, and ends up as a homeless woman shuttling back and forth along the L train between Union Square and the 14th Street/Sixth Avenue station. Six months later Rachel begs to be let in and is accepted, having been too traumatized by the real world to deal with it.

Sixty-one years later, Rachel is an old woman dying in a hospital bed. A NAAAAA representative offers her two choices of retirement: uploading her mind to a digital server to continue her employment or release back onto the streets of New York. Rachel chooses the former, and is subsequently reunited with the digital ghosts of Darci, the Ormonts, and Poorspigga, as well as Mommy 6.0. The two kiss, and embrace, yet Rachel is confused why the interaction doesn't provoke the feelings she wanted. Mommy 6.0 only responds in marketable platitudes. Rachel, distraught by the absence of humanity, subsequently asks to have her digital mind shut down, which is granted.

== Cast ==
- Betsey Brown as Rachel
- Chloe Cherry as Mommy 6.0
- Dasha Nekrasova as Darci
- Jane Brown as Mrs Ormont
- Ron Farrar Brown as Mr Ormont
- Sofia Haukeman as Poorspigga
- Jimmy Noonan as Khartoum
- Crystal Ward as Gotham
- Ben Tripp as George
- John Borras as Bronx John
- Ivy Wolk as audience member
- Allen Lewis Rickman, Ratnesh Dubey, and Melissa Carpio as board members
- Curtis Yarvin as audience member
- James Jones as audience member

== Production ==
Variety announced the production of www.RachelOrmont.com in July 2022, calling it a "sci-fi drama". The film was described as a "psychedelic technosatire about growing up in captivity".

The project was produced by The Ion Pack in association with Gummy Films, Simone Films, and Fast Rainbow Films.

The domain name "www.rachelormont.com" features a still of Rachel clasping her hands and looking up while dramatic music plays. It also features a contact button that connects the user to a Rachel-themed email.

== Release ==
www.RachelOrmont.com had its world premiere at the San Francisco Jewish Film Festival on 25 July 2024. It then premiered at SXSW Sydney in October, before appearing at multiple venues across the United States.

== Reception ==
Forbes wrote: "This fictional tale collapses the internet, theater, the movie screen into a dystopian world where, with the creation of a world blurring online and offline, the three merge into a secret fourth thing."

In PopMatters, Nick Malone called the film "a filthy and absurd midnight movie determined to fry brains and flip stomachs; a film so terminally online that even the milder scenes would, as the kids say, 'kill a Victorian child'. The second feature-length effort from NYC's Peter Vack following his 2017 debut Assholes (a grossout 'romance' about addiction and anal fetish starring the director's sister and parents), RachelOrmont is a provocation of a different breed: one that dares the squeamish to reckon with the schizoid darkness happening on cellphones all around them; and for those already part of its world to feel the vice grip they're in."

In J. The Jewish News of Northern California, David Wilensky called the film "darkly, outrageously funny. It is also, for want of a better word, utterly gross", and added: "Do not see this with anyone you're related to of another generation. It will go poorly."

In 2024, Filmmaker reported that the film was achieving "'cult hit' status".
