= The Cathedral (2021 film) =

2021 film by Ricky D'Ambrose

- Official promotional poster
- Directed by: Ricky D'Ambrose
- Written by: Ricky D'Ambrose
- Produced by: Graham Swon
- Starring: Brian d'Arcy James; Monica Barbaro; Mark Zeisler; Geraldine Singer; William Bednar-Carter; Madeline Hudelson; Linnea Gregg
- Cinematography: Barton Cortright
- Edited by: Ricky D'Ambrose
- Production company: Ravenser Odd
- Distributed by: MUBI
- Release dates: September 2021 (Venice); September 2, 2022 (United States)
- Running time: 88 minutes
- Country: United States
- Language: English
- Budget: $200,000

The Cathedral is a 2021 American semi-autobiographical coming-of-age drama film written, directed, and edited by Ricky D'Ambrose. It stars Brian d'Arcy James, Monica Barbaro, Mark Zeisler, Geraldine Singer, and William Bednar-Carter. It revolves around an only child's meditative, impressionistic account of an American family's rise and fall over two decades.

The film had its world premiere at the 78th Venice International Film Festival in September 2021, where it was awarded the HFPA Special Prize. It was given a limited theatrical release in the United States on September 2, 2022, before its streaming release on September 9, by MUBI. It received generally positive reviews from critics. At the 38th Independent Spirit Awards, it won the John Cassavetes Award and was nominated for Best Supporting Performance (for James) and Best Editing.

== Premise ==
The film follows the life of Jesse Damrosch from his birth in 1987 until his college acceptance at the age of twenty. Familial drama like the AIDS-related death of his uncle Joseph, and his tense relationship with his father occurs against the backdrop of historical events like the 1993 bombing of the World Trade Center in New York City and the presidency of George W. Bush.

== Cast ==
- Brian d'Arcy James as Richard Damrosch
- Monica Barbaro as Lydia Damrosch
- Mark Zeisler as Nick Orkin
- Geraldine Singer as Flora Orkin
- Hudson McGuire as Jesse (age 3–5)
- Henry Glendon Walter V as Jesse (age 9)
- Robert Levey II as Jesse (age 12)
- William Bednar-Carter as Jesse (age 16)
- Madeline Hudelson as Kara Orkin
- Linnea Gregg as Christine Orkin

== Production ==
The film was selected for the Biennale College Cinema 2020-2021 program, which awarded it a €150,000 grant for production. It is a semi-autobiographical film based on the life of Ricky D'Ambrose, who wrote, directed and edited the film. David Lowery served as the film's executive producer.

== Release ==
The film had its international premiere at the 78th Venice International Film Festival. It premiered in the United States at the 2022 Sundance Film Festival. In December 2021, Visit Films purchased worldwide sales rights to the film, with Mubi acquiring the distribution rights for the United States and United Kingdom respectively.

== Reception ==
The film received mostly positive reviews from critics, who praised its approach to storytelling and visuals. On the review aggregator website Rotten Tomatoes, 96% of 23 critics' reviews are positive, with an average rating of 7.6/10. The website's consensus reads: "As carefully and impressively constructed as its title would suggest, The Cathedral offers an absorbing, impressionistic child's-eye look at family life." Metacritic, which uses a weighted average, assigned the film a score of 82 out of 100, based on 6 critics, indicating "universal acclaim".

Writing for Deadline Hollywood, Todd McCarthy described the film as "eccentric" and praised filmmaking D'Ambrose's technique. In a review for Artforum, Amy Taubin characterized the film's use of sensory and visual guides to explore the memory of Jesse as "experimental." Richard Brody of The New Yorker favorably compared The Cathedral to the autobiographical films of Terence Davies.

Brian Tallerico, writing for RogerEbert.com, gave a more mixed review. He described the film as "clever" but said that some aspects of its performances and direction made it feel "disjointed" at times. Jordan Raup of The Film Stage gave the film a B, praising its handling of a coming of age story, while criticizing some performances as being "wooden".

Alissa Wilkinson of Vox described the film as "quietly stunning jewel box of a film", and included it on a list of the 18 best films at Sundance in 2022. It was also included on Thrillist's list of "The Best Movies at the 2022 Sundance Film Festival."
