= Ponderosa (film) =

- Directed by: Rob Rice
- Written by: Rob Rice
- Produced by: Megan Pickrell; Matthew Porterfield; Amy Powell; Rob Rice
- Starring: Jack Dylan Grazer; Alexis Bledel; Bill Camp
- Cinematography: Barton Cortright
- Edited by: Mina Fitzpatrick
- Music by: Curtis Green
- Production companies: 42West; Full Spectrum Features
- Release date: June 6, 2026 (Tribeca Festival)
- Running time: 90 minutes
- Country: United States
- Language: English

Ponderosa is a 2026 American comedy-drama horror mystery film written, produced, and directed by Rob Rice. It stars Jack Dylan Grazer, Alexis Bledel, and Bill Camp.

The film premiered at the Tribeca Festival on June 6, 2026, and afterwards screened widely across the US, at festivals such as the New/Next Film Fest, the Chicago Underground Film Festival, and Indie Memphis, as well as internationally at the 50th Sao Paolo Mostra and the 67th Thessaloniki International Film Festival, where the film was awarded Best Director and Best Actress.

== Premise ==
When the buffet where Zeke's mom works closes down, he's forced to entertain the wild advances of a rich regular who is weirdly obsessed with becoming his father.

== Cast ==
- Jack Dylan Grazer as Zeke
- Alexis Bledel as Sandra
- Bill Camp as George
- Nicholas Podany as The Sponsor

== Production ==
Principal photography occurred in November 2024 in Naperville, Illinois on the experimental horror-comedy, with additional production in Ludington, Michigan.

== Release ==
Ponderosa premiered in the US Narrative Competition at the Tribeca Festival on June 6, 2026.
