= I'm Charlie Walker =

American drama film

- Directed by: Patrick Gilles
- Screenplay by: Patrick Gilles
- Produced by: Charlie Walker; Mike Regen; Patrick Gilles
- Starring: Mike Colter; Safiya Fredericks; Monica Barbaro; Dylan Baker
- Cinematography: Bill Holshevnikoff
- Production company: FAMM Films
- Distributed by: Shout! Studios
- Release date: June 10, 2022
- Running time: 78 minutes
- Country: United States
- Language: English

I'm Charlie Walker is a 2022 true-life drama film. It is written and directed by Patrick Gilles. The film stars Mike Colter, Safiya Fredericks, Dylan Baker and Monica Barbaro.

== Plot ==
Charlie Walker faced down racism to lead a clean up in San Francisco Bay in 1971 after two tankers collide beneath the Golden Gate Bridge, leaking 800,000 gallons of oil.

== Cast ==
- Mike Colter as Charlie Walker
- Safiya Fredericks as Ann Walker
- Monica Barbaro as Peggy
- Dylan Baker as Mr Bennett
- Emma Caulfield as Fran
- Steven Wiig as Dan Wallace
- Boots Riley as Bartender Ray
- Carl Lumbly as Willie
- Mark Leslie Ford as Mr Sharpe
- Greg Cipes as Zephyr
- Willie Brown as cab driver

== Production ==
Patrick Gilles wrote and directed the real life story from FAMM Films. The film was produced by Charlie Walker and Mike Regen, with William O’Keeffe executive producer. Mark Harris, Jordan Fields and John Rotella served as associate producers. Shout Studios picked up distribution rights in February 2022.

== Release ==
The film had a video-on-demand and limited theatrical release date of June 10, 2022.

== Reception ==
On the review aggregator website Rotten Tomatoes, I'm Charlie Walker holds an approval rating of 43% based on 21 reviews.

Lisa Kennedy in The New York Times said Colter imbues Walker with a "cool savvy". Robert Abele for TheWrap described "a commanding, old-school star-wattage turn from Mike Colter" but concedes that "its mix of sidelined Black history and fight-the-power narrative is too messy to have the impact it should".
