= The Feeling That the Time for Doing Something Has Passed =

- Theatrical release poster
- Directed by: Joanna Arnow
- Written by: Joanna Arnow
- Produced by: Graham Swon; Pierce Varous
- Starring: Scott Cohen; Babak Tafti; Joanna Arnow; Michael Cyril Creighton; Alysia Reiner
- Cinematography: Barton Cortright
- Edited by: Joanna Arnow
- Music by: Robinson Senpauroca
- Production companies: Magnetic Labs; Ravenser Odd; Nice Dissolve
- Distributed by: Magnolia Pictures
- Release dates: May 19, 2023 (Cannes); April 26, 2024 (United States)
- Running time: 87 minutes
- Country: United States
- Language: English
- Box office: $82,083

The Feeling That the Time for Doing Something Has Passed is a 2023 American comedy film, written by, directed by, and starring Joanna Arnow. It also stars Scott Cohen, Babak Tafti, Michael Cyril Creighton and Alysia Reiner. Sean Baker serves as an executive producer.

It had its world premiere at the 76th Cannes Film Festival in the Directors' Fortnight section on May 19, 2023. It was released in the United States on April 26, 2024.

== Plot ==
Ann is a 33-year-old woman in a long-term casual BDSM relationship with Allen, who dominates her. Ann is emotionally detached from her anonymous corporate job, from her judgmental parents, and from her uninterested dom. At work, she receives an award for one year of service despite having been there for more than three years, and her manager has her working on a project that would make her own job obsolete.

She begins seeing Thomas, a younger man who composes scores for children's films, though that relationship quickly peters out when he gets back together with his ex. Her sister crashes at Ann's place as her sister's marriage is on the rocks due to her husband's infidelity. At work, Ann's manager gets laid off, while she is given new responsibilities and a new title, despite not wanting them.

She meets Elliot, a dom who seems to be much more invested in roleplay than her previous partners. He dresses her in a "fuckpig" costume and is generally much more demeaning and controlling. Initially, this appeals to Ann, but he doesn't like that she requires aftercare following their sessions, and she gets bored of his attempts at public humiliation. Her sister begins to get more involved with her life, often frustrating Ann, and her boss, Karl, starts micromanaging her.

She asks her sister to move out after her sister realizes that Ann is in a relationship, something Ann has never confided to anyone in her family. She starts seeing Allen again but withdraws when she learns he is a Zionist, though she is apologetic about it soon after. Ann takes a break from all her relationships to go on a vacation with her parents, who are highly critical of her. Her dad plays guitar and sings while she's trying to read, and her mother is condescending to her.

Ann's friends help her make a dating profile on a non-fetish site. She goes on a series of dates, though none of them turn into anything until she meets Chris, with whom she bonds over a shared love of A League of Their Own. The two begin seeing each other, though Ann is uncertain if they are casual or serious. They continue to bond, but Ann has trouble communicating with him as she is used to having men tell her what to do rather than take her feelings into account.

She starts spending more time with her parents and taking on more responsibilities at work. When a coworker Ann spends a lot of time with gets another job, Ann frames some photographs he took and leaves them for him as a going-away present. Her relationship with Chris begins to get more serious, and she tries to get him into BDSM. He initially seems uncomfortable with the idea, but the two begin trying to incorporate domination and submission into their relationship.

However, she falls into old habits, getting back together with Allen, despite the fact that he continues to show little interest in her life. The film ends without revealing whether she breaks up with Chris.

== Cast ==
- Joanna Arnow as Ann
- Scott Cohen as Allen
- Babak Tafti as Chris
- Michael Cyril Creighton as Karl
- Alysia Reiner as Sister
- Keith Poulson as Simon
- Peter Vack as Thomas
- Parish Bradley as Elliot

== Release ==
The film premiered at the 2023 Cannes Film Festival in the Directors' Fortnight section on May 19, 2023. Shortly after, Magnolia Pictures acquired U.S. distribution rights to the film. It also screened at the Toronto International Film Festival on September 9, 2023, New York Film Festival on October 5, 2023, AFI Fest on October 27, 2023, and San Francisco IndieFest on February 10, 2024. It was released in the United States on April 26, 2024.

== Reception ==
On the review aggregator website Rotten Tomatoes, 85% of 48 critics' reviews are positive, with an average rating of 7.4/10. The website's consensus reads: "Joanna Arnow finds bleak humor in the struggle to connect with The Feeling That the Time for Doing Something Has Passed, a deadpan comedy that discomfits as confidently as it amuses." Metacritic, which uses a weighted average, assigned the film a score of 77 out of 100, based on 16 critics, indicating "generally favorable" reviews.
