= English (play) =

Play by Sanaz Toossi premiered in 2022

- Original language: English
- Written by: Sanaz Toossi
- Subject: Language, identity, cultural assimilation
- Setting: Karaj, Iran, 2008

Premiere
- Date: February 22, 2022
- Place: Linda Gross Theatre (New York City)

English is a play by Sanaz Toossi. The play explores themes of language, identity, and cultural assimilation, set in an English-language classroom in Karaj, Iran, in 2008. The play won the 2023 Pulitzer Prize for Drama.

The play premiered Off-Broadway at the Linda Gross Theatre by the Atlantic Theater Company in 2022 followed by several productions in Washington, D.C., Chicago, Minneapolis and San Diego, having its Broadway debut at the Roundabout Theatre Company's Todd Haimes Theatre in 2025.

The original Off-Broadway and Broadway productions received positive reviews by theatre critics, also praising Tala Ashe's and Marjan Neshat's acting performances. The productions received nominations at the Drama League Awards and five nominations at the 78th Tony Awards, including for Best Play.

== Plot ==
The play is centered around four Iranian adults preparing for the Test of English as a Foreign Language, which is crucial for their ambitions to study or live abroad. The students include Elham, an aspiring medical student; Omid, who seeks a green card; Roya, who wants to communicate with her Canadian granddaughter; and Goli, who is earnest and determined to learn. Their teacher, Marjan, who has spent nine years in Manchester, England, enforces a strict English-only rule in class, creating tension and highlighting the personal and cultural conflicts each student faces.

While a majority of the dialogue in the play is in English, the play utilizes a storytelling device where the characters speak English with heavy accents, but when speaking Farsi the actors speak English in their own native accents, to represent the flow of language in their native tongue.

== Characters ==
- Marjan: The English teacher who has returned to Iran after living in Manchester. She pushes her students to speak only English in class.
- Elham: A strong-willed and competitive student who struggles with the implication that mastering English means sacrificing her Iranian identity.
- Omid: Charming and self-assured, Omid enjoys watching English-language movies to improve his language skills.
- Roya: Soft-spoken but capable of fiery frustration, especially regarding her son.
- Goli: Sweet and earnest, representing the hardworking student who tries to stay out of conflicts.

== Original cast and characters ==
| Character | Off-Broadway (2022) | Broadway (2025) |
|---|---|---|
| Marjan | Marjan Neshat | Marjan Neshat |
| Elham | Tala Ashe | Tala Ashe |
| Roya | Pooya Mohseni | Pooya Mohseni |
| Goli | Ava Lalezarzadeh | Ava Lalezarzadeh |
| Omid | Hadi Tabbal | Hadi Tabbal |

== Production history ==
=== Atlantic Theater Company, New York City (2022) ===
English premiered Off-Broadway on February 22, 2022, at the Linda Gross Theatre by the Atlantic Theater Company. The production was directed by Knud Adams, scenic design by Marsha Ginsberg, costume design by Enver Chakartash, lighting design by Reza Behjat, and sound design by Sinan Refik Zafar. The cast, supervised by Stephen Kope, featured Tala Ashe and Marjan Neshat as lead roles and Ava Lalezarzadeh, Pooya Mohseni and Hadi Tabbal on supporting roles.

=== Studio Theater, Washington, D.C. (2023) ===
The Studio Theatre in Washington presented English from January 11, 2023, to March 12 of that year under the thater's production events Masks Required. Knud Adams directed the production.

=== The Old Globe Theatre, San Diego (2024) ===
The Old Globe Theatre in San Diego presented English from January 27 to February 25, 2024. Arya Shahi directed the production. Pooya Mohseni played Marjan and was part of the 2025 Broadway original cast.

=== Goodman Theatre, Chicago (2024) ===
English premiered at the Goodman Theatre's Owen Theatre in Chicago on May 10, 2024. The Goodman Theatre's production of English was directed by Iranian director Hamid Dehghani. It received acclaim for its thoughtful portrayal of the characters' struggles with language and identity. The set was designed by Courtney O’Neill, with costumes by Shahrzad Mazaheri, lighting by Jason Lynch, and sound design by Mikaal Sulaiman.

=== Guthrie Theater, Minneapolis (2024) ===
The Guthrie Theater's production of English opened on July 13, 2024, on the McGuire Proscenium Stage. Directed by Hamid Dehghani, the production was co-produced with the Goodman Theatre. The set design was by Courtney O’Neill, with costumes by Shahrzad Mazaheri, lighting by Jason Lynch, and sound design by Mikaal Sulaiman.

=== Roundabout Theatre Company, New York City (2025) ===
The play premiered on Broadway at the Roundabout Theatre Company's Todd Haimes Theatre in previews on January 3, 2025, and officially opened on January 23. The whole original production team returned to their respective positions, including the direction of Knud Adams.

== Reception ==
=== Off-Broadway and Broadway productions reception ===
The original Off-Broadway and Broadway productions received mostly positive reviews.

=== Others productions reception ===
Charles McNulty of Los Angeles Times wrote that the San Diego Old Globe Theatre production "is wrought with an emotional delicacy that’s beautifully captured in Arya Shahi’s well-acted production."

Critics praised the Goodman Theatre production of English for its witty and insightful script, as well as its ability to balance humor with serious themes. The play has been described as a rich character study that delves into the power of language and the personal costs of learning a new language. The Chicago Tribune praised the production for its "brilliant" portrayal of the characters' experiences, highlighting the play's global significance.

The Guthrie Theater's production of English, directed by Hamid Dehghani, received positive reviews for its emotional depth and portrayal of the struggles faced by Iranian immigrants learning a new language. Critics praised the play's humor, insight, and strong performances, while some noted the subtlety of its narrative. Overall, the production was lauded for its authenticity and impactful storytelling.

== Awards and nominations ==
| Year | Award | Category | Nominee | Result |
|---|---|---|---|---|
| 2023 | Pulitzer Prize | Drama | English | Won |
| 2025 | Tony Awards | Best Play | English | Nominated |
| 2025 | Tony Awards | Best Direction of a Play | Knud Adams | Nominated |
| 2025 | Tony Awards | Best Featured Actress in a Play | Tala Ashe | Nominated |
| 2025 | Tony Awards | Best Featured Actress in a Play | Marjan Neshat | Nominated |
| 2025 | Tony Awards | Best Scenic Design in a Play | Marsha Ginsberg | Nominated |
| 2025 | Drama League Awards | Outstanding Production of a Play | English | Nominated |
| 2025 | Drama League Awards | Outstanding Direction of a Play | Knud Adams | Nominated |
| 2025 | Drama League Awards | Distinguished Performance | Tala Ashe | Nominated |
| 2025 | Drama League Awards | Distinguished Performance | Marjan Neshat | Nominated |
| 2025 | Theatre World Awards | Outstanding Debut Performance | Marjan Neshat | Won |
