= Joanna Arnow =

American filmmaker (born 1986)

- Born: December 23, 1986 (age 39)
- Citizenship: American
- Occupations: Filmmaker, actress
- Years active: 2013-present
- Notable work: The Feeling That the Time for Doing Something Has Passed

Joanna Arnow is an American filmmaker and actress best known for writing, directing and starring in the 2023 film The Feeling That the Time for Doing Something Has Passed.

== Early life and education ==
Arnow was raised in Brooklyn and studied film at Wesleyan University. She is Jewish.

== Career ==
The Feeling That the Time for Doing Something Has Passed premiered in the Directors' Fortnight at the 2023 Cannes Film Festival. The film was released theatrically in the United States in 2024.

== Filmography ==
Year	Title	Writer	Director	Actor	Role	Notes
2013	i hate myself :)	Yes	Yes	Yes	Herself	Autobiographical documentary
2015	Bad at Dancing	Yes	Yes	Yes	Joanna	Short film
2018	Chained for Life	No	No	Yes	Hospital Representative	—N/a
2019	Laying Out	Yes	Yes	Yes	Joanna	Short film
2022	F***ed in the Head	No	No	Yes	Carrie	—N/a
2023	The Feeling That the Time for Doing Something Has Passed	Yes	Yes	Yes	Ann	—N/a
2026	Lucy Schulman	No	No	Yes	TBA	Post-production

== Awards and nominations ==
Year	Award	Category	Nominated work	Result	Ref.
2013	Lower East Side Film Festival	Audience Award	i hate myself :)	Won	
2014	Northside Film Festival	Best Feature Jury Prize	i hate myself :)	Won	
2015	AFI Fest	Best Live Action Short Film	Bad at Dancing	Nominated	
2015	Berlin International Film Festival	Golden Bear for Best Short Film	Bad at Dancing	Nominated	
2015	Berlin International Film Festival	Silver Bear for Best Short Film	Bad at Dancing	Won	
2015	Berlin International Film Festival	Teddy Award	Bad at Dancing	Nominated	
2015	Hong Kong International Film Festival	Best Short Film	Bad at Dancing	Nominated	
2023	Cannes Film Festival	Directors' Fortnight	The Feeling That the Time for Doing Something Has Passed	Nominated	
2023	Deauville Film Festival	Grand Special Prize	The Feeling That the Time for Doing Something Has Passed	Nominated	
2023	Festival du Nouveau Cinéma	Best Film	The Feeling That the Time for Doing Something Has Passed	Nominated	
2023	Hamptons International Film Festival	Best Narrative Feature	The Feeling That the Time for Doing Something Has Passed	Honorable mention	
2023	Indie Memphis Film Festival	Duncan Williams Best Screenplay Award	The Feeling That the Time for Doing Something Has Passed	Won	
2023	Montclair Film Festival	Future/Now Competition	The Feeling That the Time for Doing Something Has Passed	Won	
2023	Munich Film Festival	Best Film by an Emerging Director	The Feeling That the Time for Doing Something Has Passed	Nominated	
2023	São Paulo International Film Festival	New Directors Competition: Best Fiction	The Feeling That the Time for Doing Something Has Passed	Nominated	
2023	Thessaloniki Film Festival	Best Director, International Competition	The Feeling That the Time for Doing Something Has Passed	Won	
2023	Valladolid International Film Festival	Best Feature Film	The Feeling That the Time for Doing Something Has Passed	Nominated	
2024	Film Independent Spirit Awards	Someone to Watch Award	The Feeling That the Time for Doing Something Has Passed	Nominated	
2024	Cleveland International Film Festival	New Direction Competition	The Feeling That the Time for Doing Something Has Passed	Nominated	
