= Betsey Brown (filmmaker) =

American actress and director

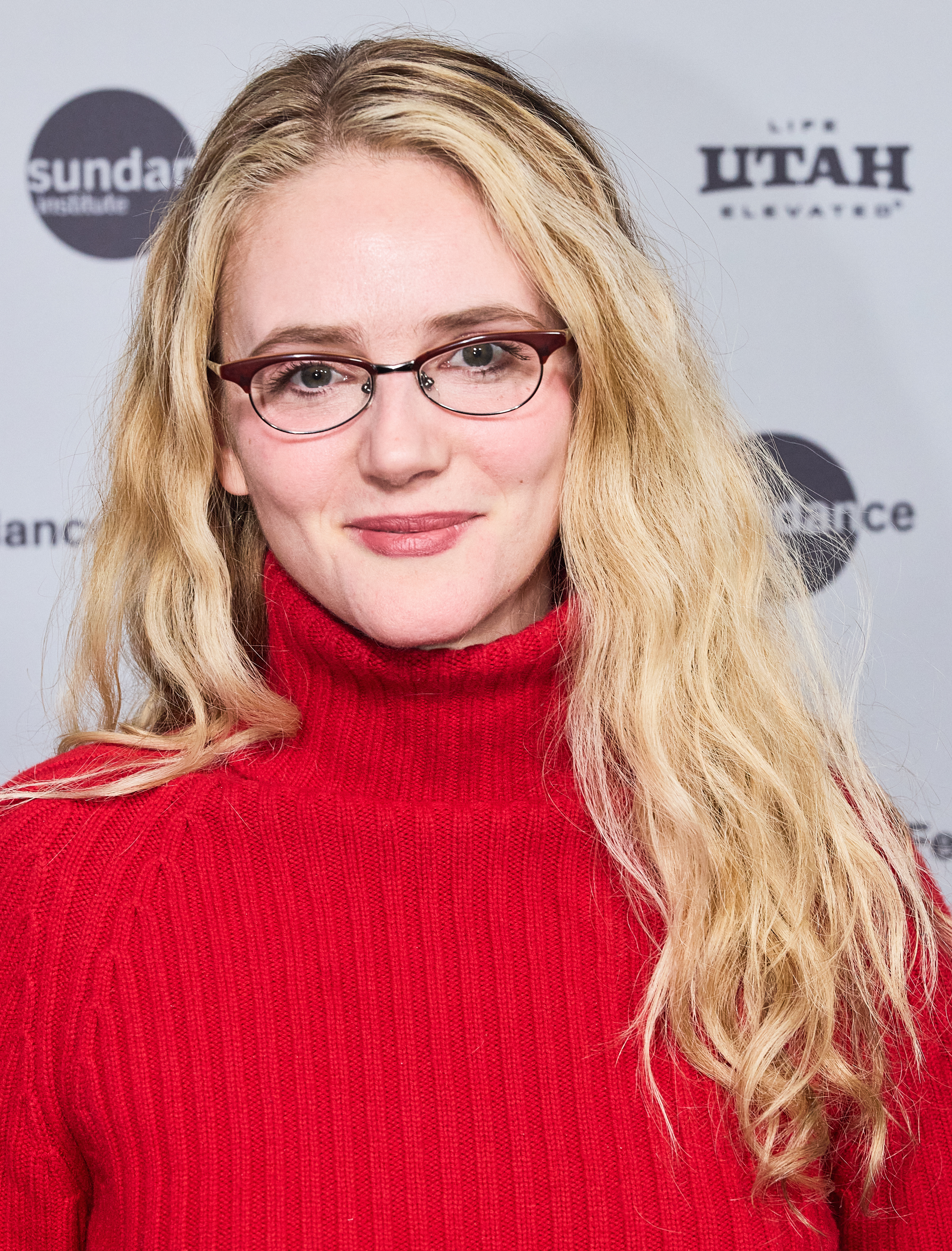
- Brown at the 2026 Sundance Film Festival
- Born: New York City, U.S.
- Occupations: Actress; director
- Years active: 2005–present
- Relatives: Peter Vack (brother)

Betsey Brown is an American actress and director known for starring in The Scary of Sixty-First and for directing and performing in the 2021 satire Actors.

== Early life ==
Brown was born and raised in Manhattan. Her father, Ron Brown, is a filmmaker, and her mother, Jane Brown, is a psychoanalyst. Her brother is actor and filmmaker Peter Vack.

== Career ==
After appearing in a number of short films and bit roles, Brown wrote, directed, and starred in the 2015 short film Shegetsey Betsey, which won the Audience Award for Best Experimental Short at the New Orleans Film Festival. Brown starred in the 2021 film The Scary of Sixty-First, directed by Dasha Nekrasova.

Brown's feature debut, Actors, was released in 2021. Actors has attracted controversy, as the plot centers a cisgender man (played by Peter Vack) who, in an attempt to further his career as a filmmaker, poses as a trans woman, despite not truly identifying as such. Brown and Vack initially stated on their Kickstarter page for Actors that the film is not a reflection of "the trans experience", but rather a depiction of "white cis male fragility" and "the lengths some will go to keep their seat at the table". However, a 2023 screening of Actors at the Music Box Theatre in Chicago was cancelled in the wake of public backlash towards the film, which included transgender director Jane Schoenbrun labeling the film as transphobic in a tweet directed at the theater.

Brown frequently collaborates with her brother, Peter Vack. She appeared in his 2017 film Assholes, while he starred in Actors. She starred as Rachel Ormont alongside Nekrasova and Chloe Cherry in Vack's film www.RachelOrmont.com, which premiered at the 2024 San Francisco Jewish Film Festival. That year, Brown served a juror for the 2024 Florida Film Festival.

== Filmography ==
=== Film ===
Key
†	Denotes films that have not yet been released

Year	Title	Role	Notes
2005	A Perfect Fit	Girl at Ballet Barre	—N/a
2010	Consent	Samantha	—N/a
2012	Forelsket	Betsey	—N/a
2015	Lace Crater	Maybe Susan	—N/a
2015	Shegetsey Betsey	Betsey	Short film, also wrote and directed
2017	Assholes	Adah Shapiro	—N/a
2021	The Scary of Sixty-First	Addy	—N/a
2021	Actors	Betsey	Also wrote and directed
2022	Hannah Ha Ha	Caitie	—N/a
2022	All Jacked Up and Full of Worms	Samantha	—N/a
2023	Caviar	Antigone Corday	—N/a
2023	The Sweet East	Betsy Ross Girl	—N/a
2024	www.RachelOrmont.com	Rachel Ormont	—N/a
2024	Carnage for Christmas	Radio Operator (voice)	Post-production
2025	Castration Movie Anthology ii. The Best of Both Worlds	Casper	—N/a
2026	Mother Future Self †		Post-production
TBA	Naked in the Park †		Post-production

=== Television ===
Year	Title	Row	Notes
2013–2014	The Carrie Diaries	Jen #3	2 episodes
2014	A Crime to Remember	Gretchen Fritz	1 episode
2015	Forever	Lucy Templeton	1 episode

== Awards and nominations ==
Year	Award	Category	Nominated work	Result
2015	New Orleans Film Festival	Audience Award for Best Experimental Short	Shegetsey Betsey	Won
2021	Molins Film Festival	Audience Award Being Different - Best Actress	The Scary of Sixty-First	Won
