= Graham Swon =

American film producer

- Education: Carnegie Mellon University
- Occupation: Producer
- Years active: 2015–present
- Spouse: Rae Swon

Graham Swon is an American film producer, director and writer. He produced The Feeling That The Time For Doing Something Has Passed, The Cathedral, and Fourteen.

== Career ==
In 2016, Swon was selected as one of Filmmaker Magazine’s 25 New Faces of Film. In 2022 at the Film Independent Spirit Awards he was nominated for the Producers Award and won the John Cassavetes Award for The Cathedral.

In addition to producing Graham has directed two feature films, The World is Full of Secrets (2018) and An Evening Song (for three voices) (2023).

== Filmography ==
Year	Film	Credit
2016	Hermia & Helena	Producer
2018	Classical Period	Producer
2018	Notes on an Appearance	Producer
2018	The World is Full of Secrets	Director, Writer, Producer
2019	Fourteen	co-producer
2021	The Cathedral	Producer
2021	The Scary of Sixty-First	line producer
2023	The Feeling That The Time For Doing Something Has Passed	Producer
2023	An Evening Song (for three voices)	Director, Writer, Producer
2026	What Can’t Be Mentioned	Producer
