= Actors (2021 film) =

2021 film directed by Betsey Brown

- Directed by: Betsey Brown
- Written by: Betsey Brown
- Produced by: Emily McEvoy
- Starring: Betsey Brown; Peter Vack; Andrew Ryder
- Cinematography: Andrew Ryder; Barton Cortright
- Edited by: Betsey Brown; Benjamin Moses Smith; Brúsi ÓIason
- Release date: 2021
- Running time: 80 minutes
- Country: United States

Actors is a 2021 film written and directed by Betsey Brown. It stars Brown, Peter Vack, and Andrew Ryder. In 2023, filmmaker Jane Schoenbrun posted on X, criticizing the film for being transphobic, due to a scene where a male character pretends to be trans. Following the criticism by Schoenbrun, the film has been removed by Music Box Theatre, that was set to premiere.
