= Sal Salandra =

American artist (born 1946)

- Born: January 1, 1946 (age 79); Edgewood, New Jersey, U.S.
- Known for: Embroidery, needlework, "thread painting"
- Website: www.salsalandra.com

Sal Salandra (born January 1, 1946) is an American contemporary artist who creates primarily homoerotic embroidery which he calls "thread painting."

== Biography ==
Sal Salandra is a second-generation Italian-American who grew up in Edgewood, New Jersey with three brothers and three sisters as a devout Catholic who considered a career in the priesthood. Christian imagery remains present in his artwork. Salandra studied to become a priest; however, because of his severe dyslexia, he gave up this career path and instead became a hairdresser. Salandra worked as a hairdresser in New Jersey for 55 years. In 1993, Salandra moved with his husband to East Hampton, New York from the couple's apartment in the West Village.

Salandra picked up needlepoint in 1980 when he was bedridden with the flu, with a needlepoint kit he received as a gift from his mother-in-law. In 2015 he began using needlepoint to make figurative images of human forms. This change lead to his trademark homoerotic motifs. His work melds leather, BDSM, and other gay sexual subcultures with figures from American pop culture and Catholic iconography. Salandra cites the corporeal punishments intrinsic to Catholic tradition as an inspiration for his BDSM scenes.

His "thread paintings" are often composed of multiple smaller scenes composing one larger scene. As Osman Can Yerebakan analyzes Salandra's work for the Brooklyn Rail: "he blends Hieronymus Bosch’s chaos with the flat pseudo-perspectives of Middle Eastern and South Asian miniature painting."

Salandra received media attention after his inclusion in the January 2020 iteration of New York's Outsider Art Fair brought a new focus on his work. At age 74, the self-taught artist had his first solo show "Sal Salandra's Thread Art Paintings" at East Hampton Shed's mobile extension, East Hampton Tow, on the 4th of July, 2020. This was followed by a solo show in 2021 at the appointment-only gallery Club Rhubarb, which was then followed by a group show in the Netherlands in 2022. His works are often displayed in "candy-colored" frames.
