= Ricky D'Ambrose =

American filmmaker (born 1987)

- Citizenship: American
- Occupation: Filmmaker
- Years active: 2015-present
- Notable work: The Cathedral

Ricky D'Ambrose is an American filmmaker known for directing the 2021 film The Cathedral.

== Career ==
His first feature, Notes on an Appearance, had its world premiere at Berlinale and its North American premiere at New Directors / New Films.

In 2017, he was named one of Filmmaker's 25 New Faces of Independent Film.

In 2021, The Cathedral had its world premiere at the 2021 Venice Film Festival and its North American premiere at Sundance. The film was nominated for three Film Independent Spirit awards and won the 2022 John Cassavetes Independent Spirit Award and was a Gotham Award nominee for 'Best Film'.

As a critic, he has contributed to The Nation, Filmmaker, n+1, MUBI and Film Quarterly.

== Filmography ==
Year	Film	Credit
2013	Pilgrims	short film
2015	Six Cents in the Pocket	short film
2017	Spiral Jetty	short film
2018	Notes on an Appearance	
2019	The Sky is Clear and Blue Today	short film
2020	Object Lessons, or: What Happened Whitsunday	short film
2021	The Cathedral	

== Awards and nominations ==
Year	Award	Category	Nominated work	Result	Ref.
2016	Berlin International Film Festival	Golden Berlin Bear for Best Short Film	Six Cents in the Pocket	Nominated	
2018	Berlin International Film Festival	Best First Feature Award	Notes on an Appearance	Nominated	
2018	Sarasota Film Festival	Independent Visions	Notes on an Appearance	Won	
2018	Montclair Film Festival	Future/Now	Notes on an Appearance	Nominated	
2018	Jeonju International Film Festival	International Competition	Notes on an Appearance	Nominated	
2020	Hamburg International Short Film Festival	Best International Short Film	The Sky is Clear and Blue Today	Nominated	
2021	Venice Film Festival	HFPA Special Prize	The Cathedral	Won	
2022	Film Independent Spirit Awards	Best Editing	The Cathedral	Nominated	
2022	Film Independent Spirit Awards	John Cassavetes Award	The Cathedral	Won	
2022	Gotham Awards	Best Feature	The Cathedral	Nominated	
2022	Sundance Film Festival	NEXT Innovator Award	The Cathedral	Nominated	
2022	Entrevues Film Festival	Grand Prix Janine Bazine Award	The Cathedral	Nominated	
2022	Ghent International Film Festival	North Sea Port Audience Award	The Cathedral	Nominated	
2022	Jerusalem Film Festival	Best International Debut	The Cathedral	Nominated	
2022	Sao Paulo International Film Festival	New Directors Competition	The Cathedral	Nominated	
2022	Athens Avant-Garde Film Festival	Grand Jury Prize	The Cathedral	Nominated	
