= Peter Vack =

American actor (born 1986)

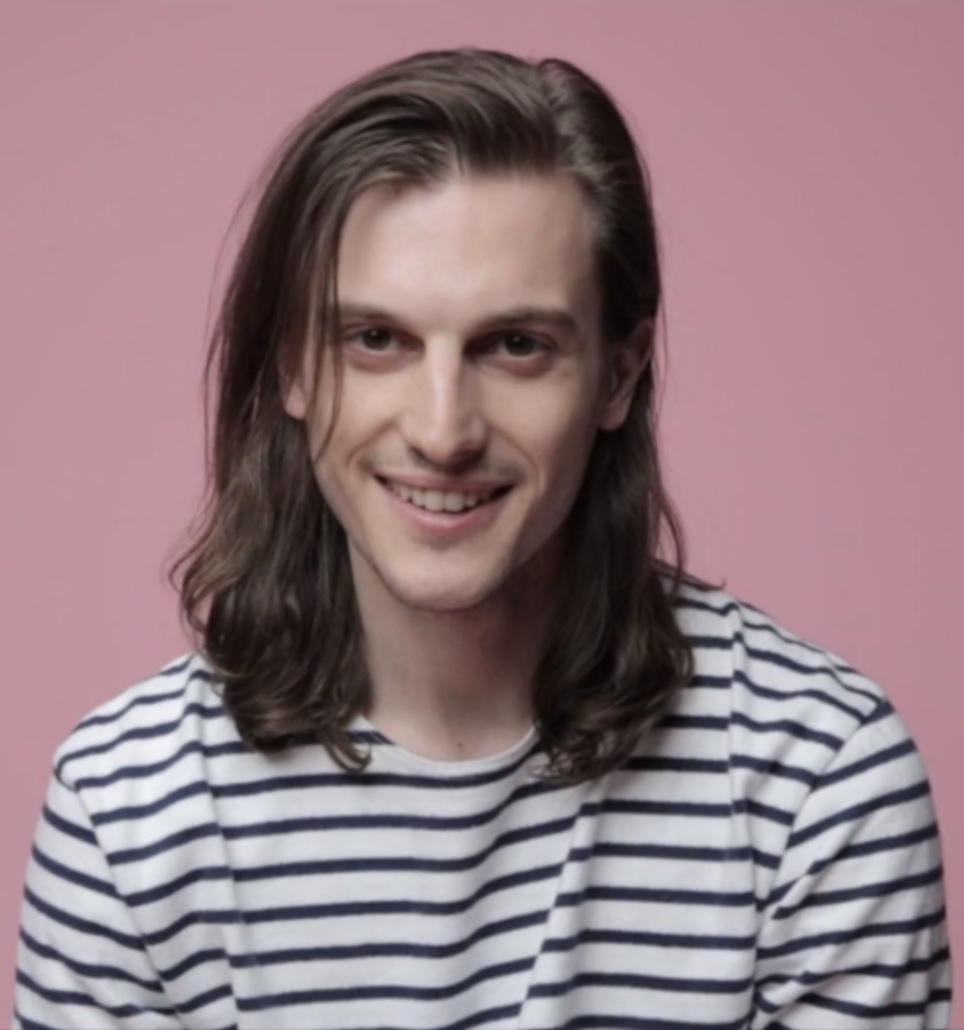
- Vack, filmed by Untitled Project Magazine in 2016
- Born: Peter S. Brown; September 19, 1986 (age 40); West Village, New York, U.S.
- Occupations: Actor; director; writer; producer
- Years active: 1996–present

Peter S. Brown (born September 19, 1986), better known by his stage name Peter Vack, is an American actor, writer, director and producer. He portrayed Jason Strider in the MTV comedy series I Just Want My Pants Back (2011–2012), and Alex Merriweather in the Amazon Video comedy-drama series Mozart in the Jungle (2014–2015). Vack also voiced antagonist Gary Smith in the Rockstar Games video game Bully. In 2017, he released his feature directorial debut, Assholes.

== Early life and education ==
Vack was born in the West Village neighborhood of Manhattan in New York City to Jane (née Spivack) and Ronald Brown, a movie producer and writer. His younger sister, Betsey, is an actress, director, and writer. Vack is Jewish.

Raised in New York City, he attended Riverdale Country School and graduated from Professional Children's School. Vack graduated from the University of Southern California, where he studied Theater.

== Career ==
Vack made his acting debut in the short film Dear Diary (1996), which won the Academy Award for Best Live Action Short Film. Vack has guest-starred in single episodes of Hope & Faith (2004), Third Watch (2004), Law & Order: Special Victims Unit (2005), Ghost Whisperer (2009) and Cold Case (2010). He also played a lead acting role in a music video for the song, 'Love in the Old Days', by James Franco's and Tim O'Keefe's band, Daddy.

From 2011 until its cancellation the following year, he portrayed Jason Strider in the short-lived MTV television series I Just Want My Pants Back. He co-starred as Alex Merriweather in the Amazon Video comedy-drama series Mozart in the Jungle (2014–2015), alongside Lola Kirke, Malcolm McDowell and Bernadette Peters.

In 2020, Vack gave an in-depth interview on popular podcast The Ion Pod.

In 2024, Vack released www.RachelOrmont.com, a feature film he wrote and directed; described as a "technosatire about growing up in captivity" starring Betsey Brown, Chloe Cherry, and Dasha Nekrasova.

== Filmography ==
=== Film ===
Year	Title	Role	Notes
1996	Dear Diary	Peter	Short film
1997	A Bedtime Story	Son	Short film
2005	A Perfect Fit	Ernie	
2006	The Treatment	Ted	
2006	Love/Death/Cobain	Doug Mortimer	Short film
2010	Consent	Joshua	
2011	A November	Boyfriend	Short film; also writer
2011	God Don't Make the Laws	Joey Larch	
2012	Commentary	Pierce Phoenix Reagan	
2012	Kiss of the Damned	Adam	
2013	CBGB	Legs McNeil	
2013	Send	N/A	Writer, director and producer
2014	Fort Tilden	Benji	
2014	I Believe in Unicorns	Sterling	
2014	Swelter	Madsen	
2015	6 Years	Will	
2015	The Intern	ATF Creative Team	
2015	Lace Crater	Michael	
2015	Ma	Priest	
2016	Slash	Mike Holloway	
2017	M.F.A.	Luke	
2017	The Price	Alex Mueller	
2017	Assholes	Adam Shapiro	Writer, director, producer
2017	Child Psychology	Peter	Short film
2017	Good People	Thorn	Short film
2017	Everything is Free	Christian	
2018	After Everything	Young Cancer Survivor	
2018	The Great Pretender	Adrian	
2019	Brittany Runs a Marathon	Ryan	
2019	Jake and Kyle Get Wedding Dates	Cousin Ricky (voice)	Direct-to-video
2019	Someone Great	Matt Lasher	
2020	PVT Chat	Jack	
2021	Actors	Peter/Petra	
2023	The Feeling That the Time for Doing Something Has Passed	Thomas	
2024	Replay	Julian	
2024	www.RachelOrmont.com	N/A	Writer, director
2025	Castration Movie Anthology ii. The Best of Both Worlds	Brody	

=== Television ===
Year	Title	Role	Notes
2004	As the World Turns	Casey Hughes	Unknown episodes
2004	Hope & Faith	Rodney	Episode: "Madam President"
2004	Third Watch	Danny's Partner	Episode: "Family Ties: Part 1"
2005	Law & Order: Special Victims Unit	Owen	Episode: "Hooked"
2009	Ghost Whisperer	Paul Jett	Episode: "Do Over"
2010	Cold Case	Lee Mavoides '89	Episode: "Almost Paradise"
2011–2012	I Just Want My Pants Back	Jason Strider	12 episodes
2014	The Michael J. Fox Show	Andreas	Episode: "Couples"
2014–2015	Mozart in the Jungle	Alex Merriweather	11 episodes
2015	The Blacklist	Asher Sutton	3 episodes
2018	Homeland	Clint	5 episodes
2019	The Bold Type	Patrick Duchand	Season 3
2020	Love Life	Jim	Main role

=== Video games ===
Year	Title	Role	Notes
2006	Bully	Gary Smith	Main antagonist

== Awards and nominations ==
Year	Award	Category	Work	Result
2010	New York VisionFest Award	Breakthrough Performance	Consent	Won
2014	SXSW Grand Jury Award	Narrative Short	Send	Nominated
