= Sylvia Khoury =

American writer and playwright

- Education: Columbia University (BA); The New School (MFA); Mount Sinai Medical Center (MD)
- Writing career
- Notable awards: Whiting Award (2021); Pulitzer Prize for Drama finalist (2022)

Sylvia Khoury is an American writer and playwright.

She was born in New York and has French and Lebanese ancestry. She was educated at Columbia University (BA) and The New School for Drama (MFA), and in 2021 gained an MD from the Icahn School of Medicine at Mount Sinai.

Khoury was the recipient of the 2021 Whiting Award for drama. Her play Selling Kabul is a 2022 Pulitzer Prize finalist for drama. Her other plays include Power Strip, Against the Hillside and The Place Women Go.
