= Selling Kabul =

2019 play by Sylvia Khoury

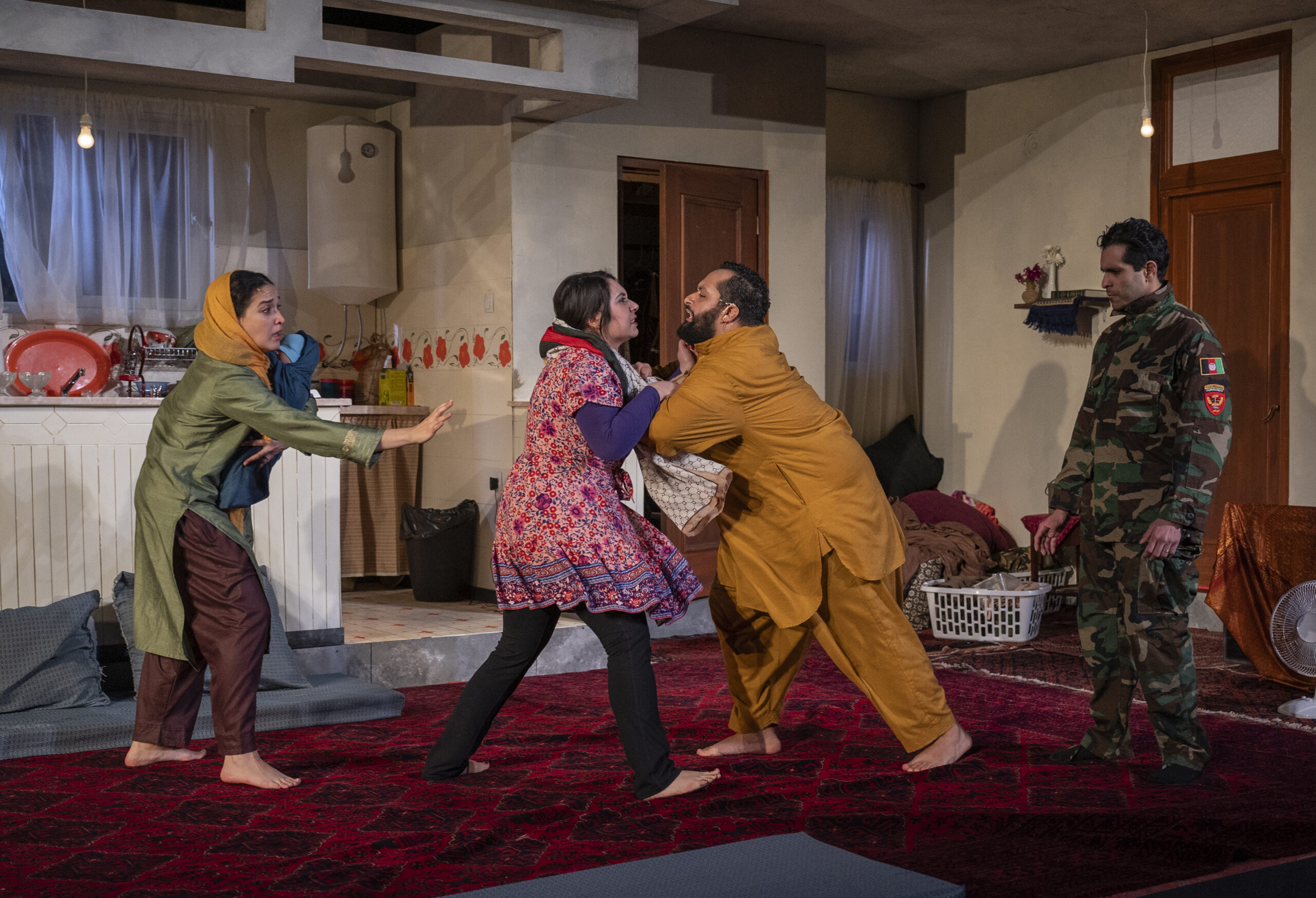
- Written by: Sylvia Khoury
- Subject: War in Afghanistan (2001–2021)
- Setting: Afghanistan

Premiere
- Date: July 10, 2019
- Place: Williamstown, Massachusetts

Selling Kabul is a 2019 American play by Sylvia Khoury. Set in 2013, the play centers a former interpreter for the U.S. Military during the War in Afghanistan forced to choose between witnessing the birth of his child or staying in hiding as a target of the Taliban. The play was a finalist for the 2022 Pulitzer Prize for Drama.

== Production history ==
=== Williamstown Theatre Festival (2019) ===
Selling Kabul had its world premiere on July 10, 2019 on the Nikos Stage at the Williamstown Theatre Festival, produced in association with Playwrights Horizons. The play won the 2018 L. Arnold Weissberger New Play Award administered by the Williamstown Theatre Festival, which grants winners a reading at the Williastown Theatre Festival. This production was directed by Tyne Rafaeli, and featured Omid Abtahi, May Calamawy, Marjan Neshat, and Babak Tafti.

=== Playwrights Horizons (2021) ===
Selling Kabul made its Off-Broadway and New York debut on November 17, 2021 through Playwrights Horizons at the Peter Jay Sharp Theatre, directed by Tyne Rafaeli and starring Francis Benhamou, Mattico David, Marjan Neshat, and Dario Ladani Sanchez. This production was produced in association with the Williamstown Theatre Festival. The show was initially scheduled to play in March 2020, with Babak Tafti in the role of Taroon, but was rescheduled due to the COVID-19 pandemic.

=== Northlight Theatre (2024) ===
In 2024, Selling Kabul was staged at Northlight Theatre in Chicago, directed by Hamid Dehghani. This production received critical acclaim for its tense and emotionally rich portrayal of the play's themes.

== Reception ==
The show has received positive reviews. Alexis Soloski of The New York Times declared the show's Playwrights Horizon production a Critics Pick, praising its sharp writing and the effective suspense created by the script and production design. Catey Sullivan, writing about a February 2024 production of the show by Northlight Theatre for the Chicago Sun-Times, similarly praised Khoury for having "structured a breathless, airtight plot where every moment of dialogue — and even seemingly innocuous bits of sound design — fits precisely into an intricate, meticulously rendered puzzle that shocks and surprises right up until the last piece falls into place."
