= Sanaz Toossi =

American playwright and screenwriter

- Born: 1991 or 1992 (age 34–35); Orange County, California, U.S.
- Education: University of California, Santa Barbara (BA); New York University (MFA)
- Occupations: Playwright, screenwriter, actress
- Writing career
- Genres: Drama, comedy, dramatic comedy, comedy-drama
- Subjects: Iranian diaspora, language, identity, family

Sanaz Toossi (born 1991/1992) is an American playwright and screenwriter. Her play English won the Pulitzer Prize for Drama in 2023.

== Life and career ==
Toossi was born in Orange County, California, where she grew up. She is of Iranian descent; her father, an engineer, emigrated to the United States before the Iranian Revolution and her mother, a chemist, did so afterward. She is an only child, speaking Persian in her family home and English outside it, and visited Iran regularly when she was growing up. She grew up a self-described "weird theatre kid."

Toossi earned her bachelor's degree from the University of California, Santa Barbara, majoring in pre-law. She said that she decided to change her career plan from law to playwriting after seeing a performance of Amy Herzog's 4000 Miles at the South Coast Repertory. She graduated from the Tisch School of the Arts at NYU in 2018. There she studied under Suzan-Lori Parks, Oskar Eustis, and Lucas Hnath. Her plays are drawn from personal experience and the experiences of her family.

Her first two major plays opened in New York in early 2022, in off-Broadway theaters: English at the Atlantic Theater Company in February and Wish You Were Here at Playwrights Horizons in April.

=== English ===
Toossi originally wrote English as her NYU graduate school thesis. She described it as an angry reaction to President Trump's 2017 executive order, known as the "Muslim ban," prohibiting travel to the United States from Iran and six other Muslim-majority states. The play is a comedy set in a schoolroom in Karaj, Iran where a teacher is teaching the English language to four adult students. Helen Shaw wrote in a February 2025 review in The New Yorker that English addresses "the way half-learned languages can rub against one another, sometimes erasing aspects—compassion, graciousness, humor—of the person using them." Shaw added, "for all the precise realism of the play's setting and dialogue, Toossi seems to be writing allegorically about a wider experience, perhaps one familiar to her, of the immigrant's double consciousness."

The first production of English, scheduled for 2020 at the Roundabout Theatre Company's Underground Black Box Theatre, was postponed because of the COVID-19 pandemic. The play opened at the Atlantic Theater Company's Linda Gross Theater, in a co-production with Roundabout, on February 22, 2022. English was staged in 2023 and 2024 across North America, in Boston; Washington, D.C.; Toronto; Montreal; Berkeley, California; Atlanta; Pittsfield, Massachusetts; Seattle; Chicago; and Minneapolis; in the UK in May and June 2024, first staged by the Royal Shakespeare Company and then at the Kiln Theatre in London; in Melbourne and Canberra, Australia in August and September 2024; and in January 2025, at the Todd Haimes Theater, as its Broadway debut. Toossi herself starred in the 2023 Barrington Stage production of English as Elham.

=== Wish You Were Here ===
Toossi wrote Wish You Were Here long after English, though it debuted first. She has called it a love letter to her mother. It has been described as a "drama" or a "comedy" or a "dramatic comedy" or a "comedy-drama." It is also partially set in Karaj, and in it five women talk about their lives over thirteen years beginning in 1978, against the backdrop of that period of Iranian history. Shaw's New Yorker review describes Wish You Were Here as "gorgeous," stating "I was reminded of how brilliantly Toossi can write for people who don't understand their own motivations," and that in it, compared to English, "the playwright demonstrates far more comfort with elision and, ironically, with the unspoken."

Wish You Were Here premiered on July 1, 2020, as an audio performance released on Audible by the Williamstown Theatre Festival in Williamstown, Massachusetts. Its stage debut at Playwrights Horizons began previews April 13, 2022 and officially opened on May 3, 2022. Its run there was extended at least twice. Toossi acted in that performance, playing the role of Rana, on May 21 and 22, 2022. It was staged at South Coast Repertory in southern California in January–February 2025.

== Awards ==
In 2020, Toossi was one of 20 playwrights named as winners of the Steinberg Playwright Awards by the Harold and Mimi Steinberg Charitable Trust. She won the 2021 National Theatre Conference's Barrie & Bernice Stavis Playwright Award as "an outstanding emerging playwright". In 2022 the Dramatists Guild of America names Toossi as winner of the Horton Foote Award, for "a dramatist whose work seeks to plumb the ineffable nature of being human." She received a special citation for emerging talent, based on English and Wish You Were Here, in the 2022 New York Drama Critics' Circle Awards.

English received the Williamstown Theatre Festival's L. Arnold Weissberger New Play Award in 2020, the Lucille Lortel Award for Outstanding Play in 2022, the 2022 Obie Award for Best New American Play, the 2021-22 John Gassner Award (for a new American play, preferably by a new playwright) from the Outer Critics Circle Awards, the Dramatists Guild's 2023 Hull-Warriner Award (co-winner), and the 2023 Pulitzer Prize for drama.

Wish You Were Here was nominated for the 2023 Drama Desk Award for Outstanding Play.

== Works ==
=== As playwright ===
- English (2022)
- Wish You Were Here (2022)

=== As screenwriter ===
- A League of Their Own (2022)
- Five Women
- Invitation to a Bonfire
- Adults
