= Robert Lombardo (composer) =

American composer (1932–2026)

- Born: Robert Michael Lombardo; March 5, 1932
- Died: March 18, 2026 (aged 94)
- Era: Contemporary

Robert Michael Lombardo (March 5, 1932 – March 18, 2026) was an American composer and composition teacher.

== Life ==
Born in Hartford, Connecticut, to Sicilian immigrants, Lombardo received his musical training at the Hartt College of Music, the University of Hartford (BMus., composition cum laude, 1954, MMus., composition, 1955), Hochschule für Musik, Berlin (1958–1959) and the University of Iowa (Ph.D., composition, 1959–1961). His principal composition teacher was Arnold Franchetti. He also studied with Philip Bezanson and Boris Blacher.

Lombardo began teaching music theory at the University of Iowa in 1959, then moved to Hartt College in 1963. In 1964, Lombardo became Professor of theory and composition and Composer-in-Residence at The Music Conservatory of Chicago College of Performing Arts at Roosevelt University in Chicago, a position he would hold for 35 years until 1999.

Lombardo died on March 18, 2026, at the age of 94.

== Works ==
Lombardo's compositions include over 200 works for opera, orchestra, chamber music, instrumental solos, choral music, musicals, and electronic music. He has collaborated with his wife, Kathleen, poet and playwright, on several compositions. Lombardo is also one of the few composers writing for the mandolin. Dimitris Marinos performed his Concerto for Mandolin and String Quartet in a world premiere in Chicago in 1995. In addition, Marinos has recorded six of Lombardo's compositions.

Lombardo's works have been performed all over the world. In 1992, contemporary music group CUBE performed his work, in Chicago. Roosevelt University hosted a performance of several of his works on his 80th birthday. And for these, Lombardo has been the recipient of multiple awards. In 1964, he received a Guggenheim Fellowship in Music Composition, and two grants from the National Endowment for the Arts and three Ford Foundation Grants in 1962, 1963 and 1964 among others.

Lombardo's works are not limited to simply compositions; he is also respected for his commissions, which include an important work commissioned by the Serge Koussevitzky Foundation and housed in the Library of Congress. Lombardo's papers, including musical scores and correspondence, are housed at the Northwestern University Library.
