= Association du cinéma indépendant pour sa diffusion =

French film association

- Abbreviation: ACID
- Formation: 1992
- Type: Association
- Location(s): Paris, France
- Key people: Pauline Ginot (general delegate)
- Website: www.lacid.org

The Association du cinéma indépendant pour sa diffusion (ACID; transl. Association for the Diffusion of Independent Cinema) is an association of film directors with the goal of promoting the theatrical distribution of independent films and encouraging debates between filmmakers and audiences. It was founded in 1992.

Since 1993, ACID has presented a selection of nine feature films, fiction or documentary, for screening at the annual Cannes Film Festival. It is a parallel section of the festival, such as Directors' Fortnight and Critics' Week, focusing on films without French distributors and first features. It has been named one of the Top 100 Essential Film Festivals.

== Cannes Film Festival ==
ACID showcased the early features of the likes of Oscar winner Justine Triet and Oscar-nominated director Kaouther Ben Hania, as well as award winning filmmakers Radu Jude, Guy Maddin and Robert Guediguian.

Palme d’Or winner Triet’s first feature Age of Panic (La Bataille de Solférino) played in the section in 2013, while Ben Hania’s mockumentary Challat Tunes (Challat de Tunis) made the ACID cut the following the year.

A programming committee of 14 filmmakers chose the 2024 selection, which included nine feature films as world premieres, three of which were documentaries.

== See also ==
- Cannes Film Festival
- Directors' Fortnight
- Critics' Week
