= Overdressed =

Overdressed may refer to:

- Overdressed (Caedmon's Call album), 2007
- Overdressed (Cat Cohen album), 2024
