= Busboy (disambiguation) =

A busser (busboy or busgirl) is someone who assists the waiting staff in the restaurant and catering industry.

Busboy(s) may also refer to:

- Busboy Productions, a television production company
- "The Busboy", an episode of the TV series Seinfeld
- Busboys (film), an upcoming American comedy film
- The BusBoys, a musical group
