= Eva Victor =

American actor, writer, and director

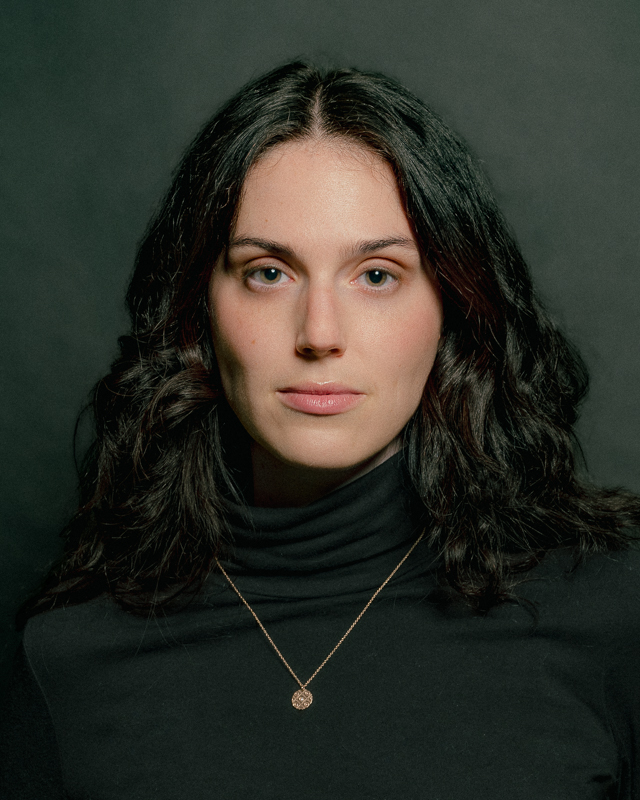
- Victor in 2025
- Born: February 11, 1994 (age 32); Paris, France
- Occupations: Actor; writer; director
- Years active: 2014—present

Eva Victor (/ˈeɪvə/ AY-və; born 11 February 1994) is a French-American actor, writer, and director. They (Note: Victor uses they/them and she/her pronouns. This article uses they/them for consistency.) appeared in the television series Billions from 2020 to 2023, and made their directorial debut with the self-starring independent film Sorry, Baby (2025), for which they were nominated for the Golden Globe Award for Best Actress in a Motion Picture – Drama.

== Early life ==
Victor was born in Paris, France, in 1994. Their family later moved to San Francisco, where they grew up.

Victor attended The International School of San Francisco, which they describe as "an intensely disciplined French speaking school," and sang in a choir. They went to college at Northwestern University to study acting, with a minor in playwriting. While there, Victor took part in comedy as part of the improv team. After graduating, they gained representation after performing a dramatic acting showcase.

== Career ==
Victor began working at feminist satire website Reductress as an intern. They later became an associate editor and staff writer at Reductress. They have written for The New Yorker's Daily Shouts section and have appeared on MTV's Decoded. Victor worked as an actress with the arts education organization Story Pirates, based in New York City.

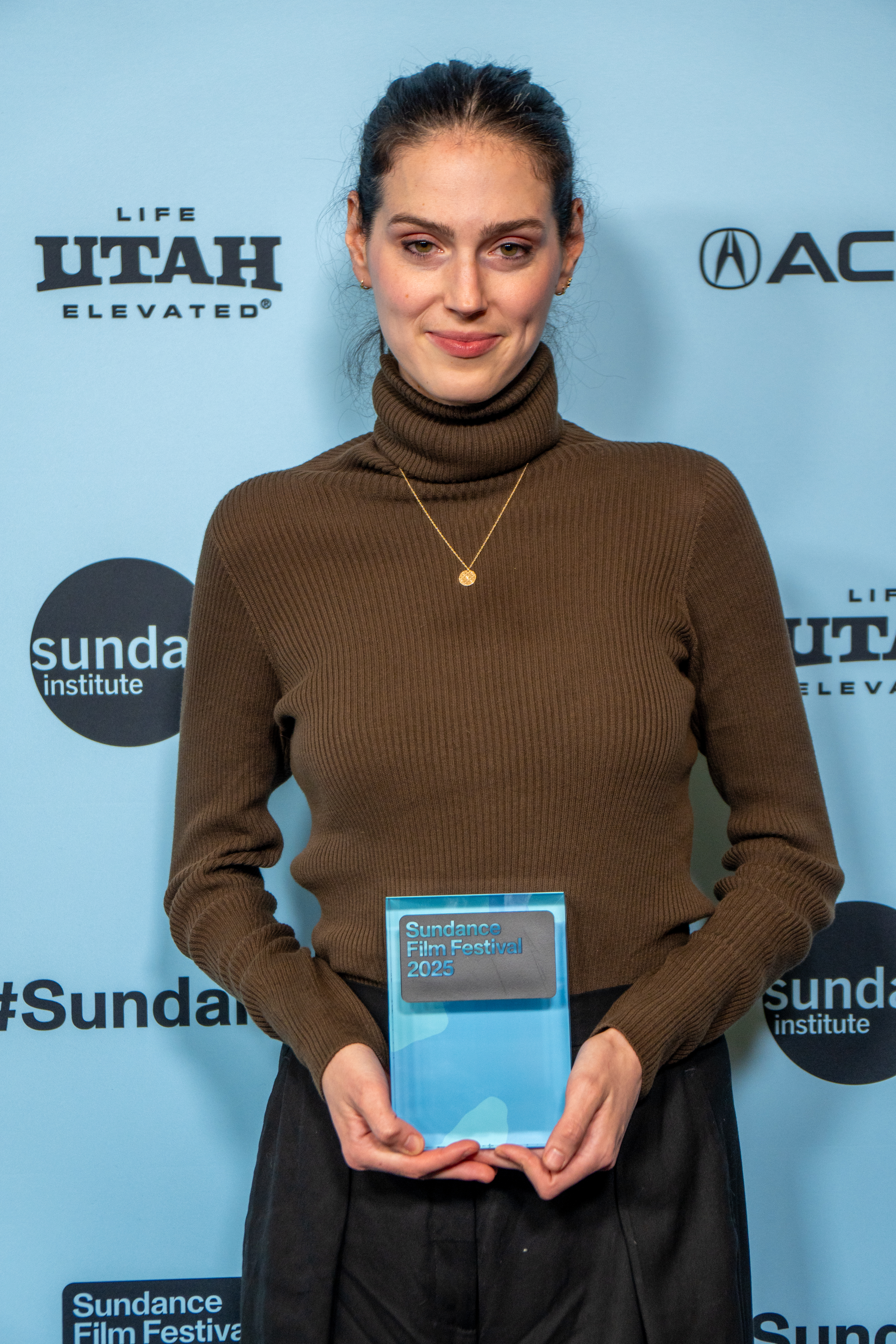
Victor at the 2025 Sundance Film Festival Awards

A number of comedy videos they have posted on Twitter have gone viral. They performed some of these videos at a live event hosted by BuzzFeed in 2019. Victor also makes videos for Comedy Central.

Victor appeared in recurring roles in some of television series aired on Showtime, first as Rian in Billions and later as Susan Fowler in the first season of Super Pumped. In December 2019, Victor was cast in Jonah Feingold's directorial debut Dating and New York.

Victor became interested in filmmaking during the COVID-19 pandemic. Films that inspired them included Persona, In the Mood for Love, The Spirit of the Beehive, Burning, Margaret, and Losing Ground. They also shadowed filmmaker Jane Schoenbrun on the set of I Saw The TV Glow.

In 2025, Victor made their directorial debut with Sorry, Baby, a film about a college literature professor named Agnes living through the aftermath of a sexual assault she experienced while in graduate school. Produced by Barry Jenkins, the film had its world premiere at the 2025 Sundance Film Festival and won the Waldo Salt Screenwriting Award. The film also screened at 2025 Cannes Film Festival, where it was nominated for Caméra d'Or and Queer Palm. While writing the script, Victor sublet their cousin's home in rural Maine, secluding themselves for three weeks in the middle of winter with just their cat. During a Q&A session with Le Cinema Club, Victor stated the goal of making the film was to "feel safe enough to laugh" despite a focus on depression and sexual assault.

== Personal life ==
Victor at the 2026 New York Film Festival for Behemoth!

Victor is queer and non-binary, and uses both they/them and she/her pronouns. They are a survivor of sexual assault, which served as an inspiration for Sorry, Baby.

== Filmography ==
- Billions (2020–2023) as Rian
- Dating and New York (2021) as Jenna 'The Rebounds' Brookes
- Super Pumped (2022) as Susan Fowler
- Boys Go to Jupiter (2024) as Gail 5000 (voice)
- Sorry, Baby (2025) as Agnes (also writer and director)
- Teenage Sex and Death at Camp Miasma (2026) as DJ Ella Giastic
- Behemoth! (2026) as Nadia Hynes
- The Terrors of Jordan Mendoza (2026) as Colleen

== Awards and nominations ==
Organization	Date of ceremony	Category	Nominated work	Result	Ref.
Astra Awards	January 9, 2026	Best Actress – Comedy or Musical	Sorry, Baby	Nominated	
Astra Midseason Movie Awards	July 3, 2025	Best Actress	Sorry, Baby	Runner-up	
British Independent Film Awards	November 30, 2025	Best International Independent Film	Sorry, Baby	Nominated	
Cannes Film Festival	May 24, 2025	Directors' Fortnight	Sorry, Baby	Nominated	
Cannes Film Festival	May 24, 2025	Camera d'Or	Sorry, Baby	Nominated	
Cannes Film Festival	May 24, 2025	Queer Palm	Sorry, Baby	Nominated	
Critics' Choice Movie Awards	January 4, 2026	Best Original Screenplay	Sorry, Baby	Nominated	
Directors Guild of America Awards	February 7, 2026	Directors Guild Award for Outstanding Directorial Feature Debut	Sorry, Baby	Nominated	
Golden Globe Awards	January 11, 2026	Best Actress in a Motion Picture - Drama	Sorry, Baby	Nominated	
Gotham Film Awards	December 1, 2025	Best Original Screenplay	Sorry, Baby	Nominated	
Film Independent Spirit Awards	February 16, 2026	Best Director	Sorry, Baby	Nominated	
Film Independent Spirit Awards	February 16, 2026	Best Screenplay	Sorry, Baby	Won	
Las Culturistas Culture Awards	August 5, 2025	We Could See Boop! Award for Best Thing to See	Sorry, Baby	Nominated	
Los Angeles Film Critics Association Awards	December 7, 2025	Best Screenplay	Sorry, Baby	Runner-up	
Mill Valley Film Festival	October 5, 2025	Mind the Gap Award	Sorry, Baby	Won	
National Board of Review	January 13, 2026	Best Directorial Debut	Sorry, Baby	Won	
Seattle Film Critics Society	December 15, 2025	Best Actress	Sorry, Baby	Nominated	
Seattle Film Critics Society	December 15, 2025	Best Screenplay	Sorry, Baby	Nominated	
Sundance Film Festival	February 2, 2025	Waldo Salt Screenwriting Award	Sorry, Baby	Won	
St. Louis Film Critics Association Awards	December 14, 2025	Best Original Screenplay	Sorry, Baby	Nominated	
St. Louis Film Critics Association Awards	December 14, 2025	Best First Feature Film	Sorry, Baby	Won	
Valladolid International Film Festival	November 1, 2025	Best Actress	Sorry, Baby	Won	
