= Catherine Cohen =

American comedian and actress

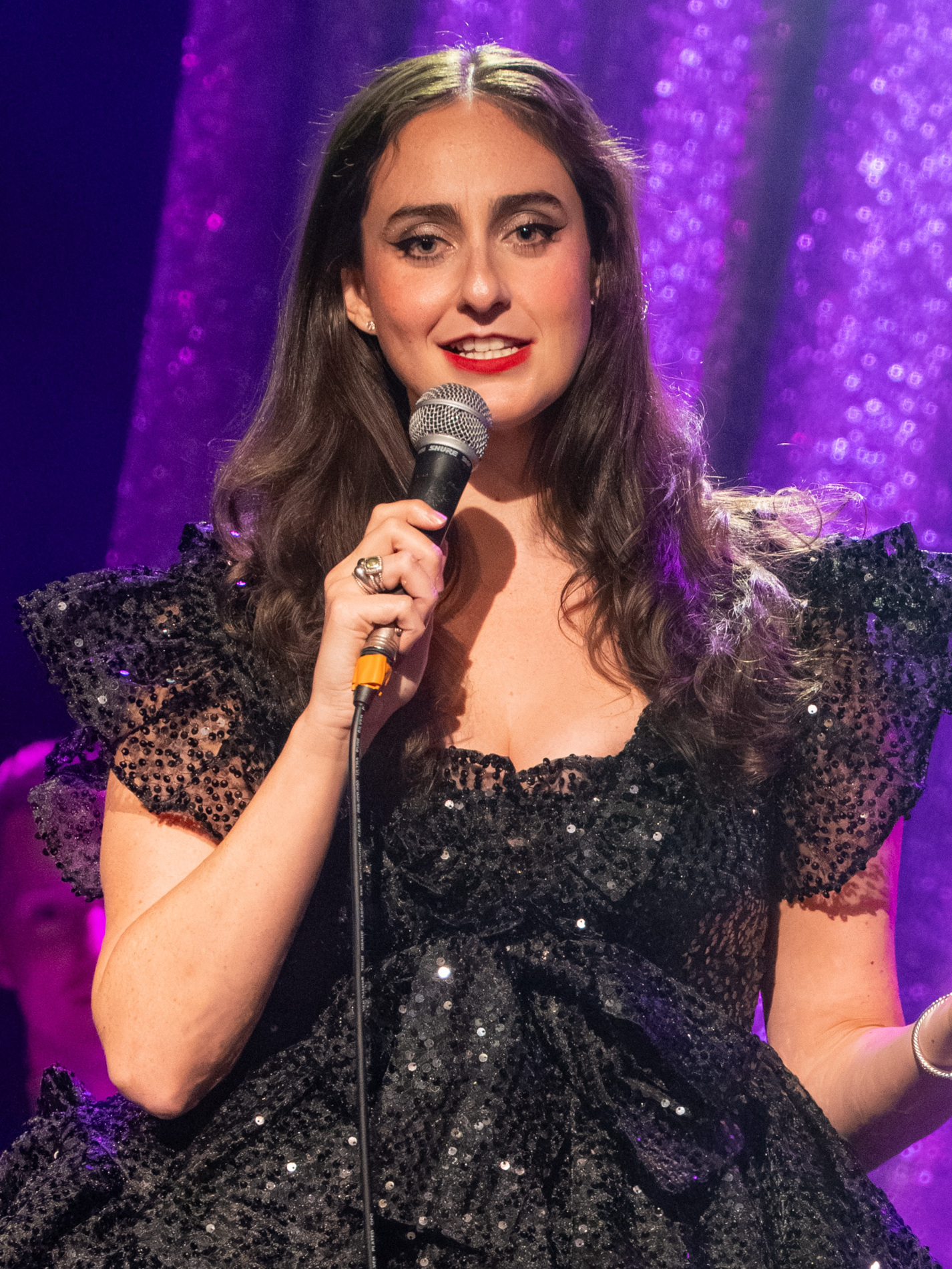
- Cohen performing at Edinburgh Festival Fringe in 2025
- Born: August 11, 1991 (age 35)
- Education: Princeton University (BA)
- Occupations: Comedian; actress; singer

Catherine Cohen (born August 11, 1991), also known as Cat Cohen, is an American comedian, actress, and singer. Her live comedy performances combine stand-up comedy with cabaret-style songs. Her first Netflix comedy special, The Twist...? She's Gorgeous, was released in 2022.

== Early life ==
Cohen was born on August 11, 1991, and raised in Houston, Texas. She graduated from Princeton University, where she was a member of the Ivy Club and the Kappa Alpha Theta sorority. She then moved to New York City to perform stand-up and sketch comedy, taking classes at the Upright Citizens Brigade and working at the Peoples Improv Theater.

== Career ==
=== Comedy ===
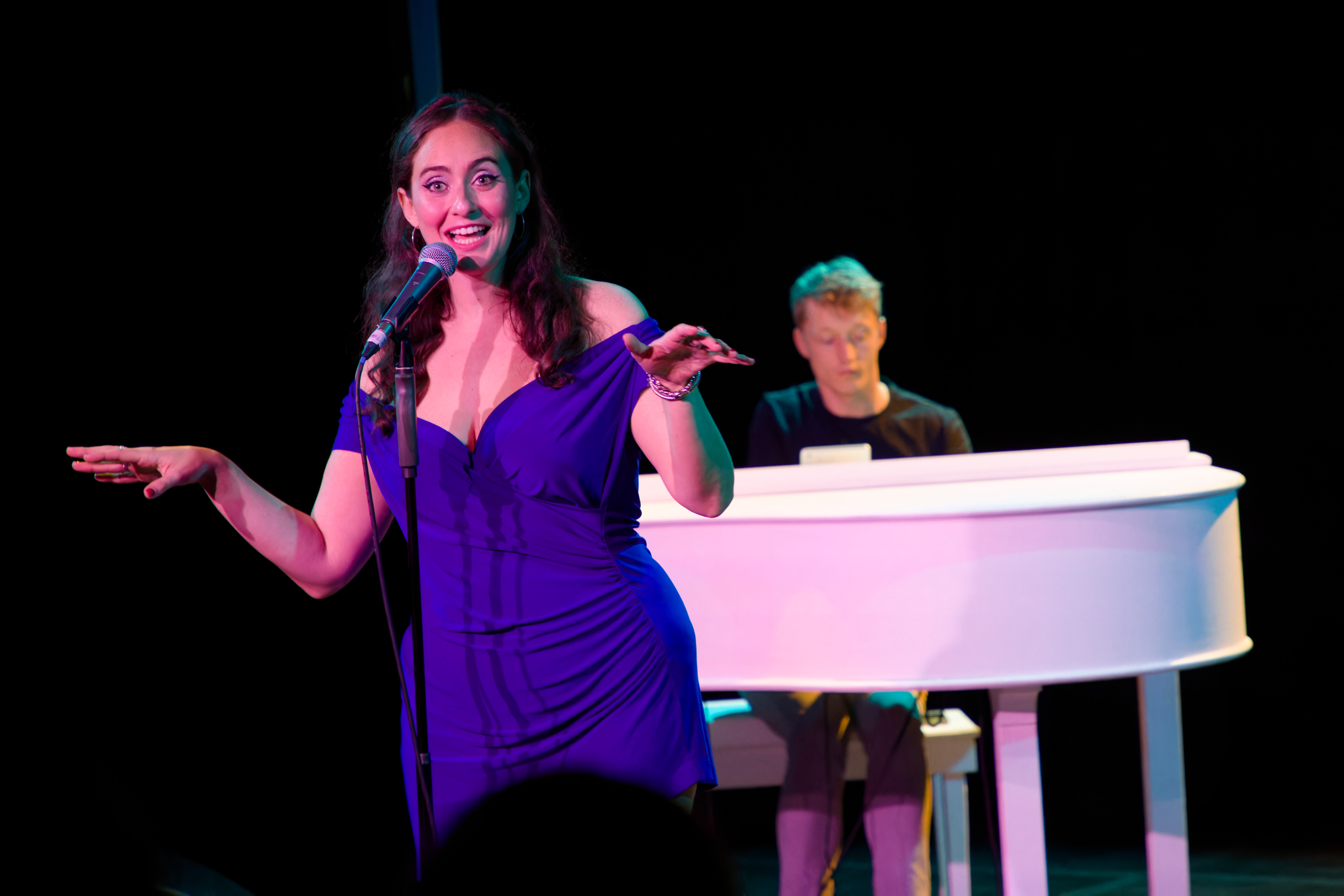
Cat Cohen at the 2024 Edinburgh Festival Fringe

Cohen has received positive critical reception for performing comedy cabaret, and was named on "comedians to watch" lists by Vulture and Time Out in 2018. She has a monthly show at Joe's Pub called The Twist...? She's Gorgeous, which includes singing and accompaniment, and a weekly show called Cabernet Cabaret at Club Cumming. Both shows are performed with her frequent collaborator, Henry Koperski, who accompanies her on the piano. Her performances were described by Madeleine Aggeler of The Cut as "a spinning, glittery, Technicolor explosion". She also co-hosts a monthly comedy show called It's a Guy Thing with Patti Harrison and Mitra Jouhari. As an actress, she has appeared on comedy series such as High Maintenance, Broad City, Search Party, and What We Do in the Shadows.

In 2019, Cohen was a nominee for best comedian at the 11th Shorty Awards, and won the best newcomer award at the Edinburgh Fringe. Her first Netflix comedy special, also called The Twist...? She's Gorgeous, was released in 2022 based on her 2019 Edinburgh Fringe show.

Cohen hosts a weekly podcast called Seek Treatment with co-host Pat Regan. The show premiered on July 24, 2018.

In 2026, her one-woman show, Broad Strokes, a musical about her experience having a stroke at the age of 30, debuted at the Lucille Lortel Theatre. The production opened on July 27, 2026, directed by Alex Timbers and starring Cohen, who wrote the lyrics and book and co-wrote the music with David Dabbon.

=== Music ===
Cohen's debut album, Overdressed, was announced to come out November 2024 via Elektra Records under Atlantic Records. She told Rolling Stone that merging her love of comedy with Pop music is a dream come true.

== Personal life ==
As of December 2022, Cohen is in a relationship with actor Brian Muller.

== Filmography ==
=== Film ===
Year	Title	Role
2020	The Lovebirds	Mrs. Hipster
2020	Slow Machine	Cretinous Roommate
2021	Home Sweet Home Alone	Mrs. Claus
2021	Dating and New York	Jessie Katz
2023	At Midnight	Rachel Abrams
2024	The French Italian	Valerie
2025	Sentimental Value	Nicky
2025	The Running Man	Fake Kardashian
TBA	Goodbye Girl	

=== Television ===
Year	Title	Role	Notes
2015–2018	The Special Without Brett Davis	Various roles	2 episodes
2016	Above Average Presents	Wife	Episode: "Unwritten Rules Of Baseball IRL"
2017	Difficult People	Millenial Velma	Episode: "Sweet Tea"
2018	Broad City	Girl	Season 5, episode 10
2019	High Maintenance	Darby	Episode: "Craig"
2019	Alternatino with Arturo Castro	Salesgirl	Episode: "The Gift"
2020	Three Busy Debras	Narrator	6 episodes
2020–2021	Search Party	Miami	2 episodes
2021	Special	Stella	Episode: "I Don't Like It Like This"
2021	Awkwafina Is Nora from Queens	Jennifar	Episode: "Charlie's Angels"
2021	What We Do in the Shadows	Sheila	Episode: "The Siren"
2024	Girls5eva	Taffy England	Episode: "Orlando"
2024	Only Murders in the Building	Trina Brothers	5 episodes
2025	Sirens	Lily	2 episodes

== Discography ==
All credits adapted from Spotify and Apple Music.

=== As lead artist ===
==== Singles ====
Year	Title	Album	Writer(s)	Producer(s)
2024	"Blame It On The Moon"	Overdressed	Catherine Cohen, David Dabbon	Couros
2024	"Can U Send Me That??"	Overdressed	Catherine Cohen, Belot, Pura Bliss	Couros

==== Studio albums ====
Title	Details
Overdressed	Released: November 15, 2024; Label: Elektra Entertainment; Formats: Digital download, streaming
