= Dating and New York =

American comedy film

- Theatrical release poster
- Directed by: Jonah Feingold
- Written by: Jonah Feingold
- Produced by: Joaquin Acrich
- Starring: Jaboukie Young-White; Francesca Reale; Catherine Cohen; Brian Muller; Jerry Ferrara; Arturo Castro; Taylor Hill; Alex Moffat; Eva Victor; Yedoye Travis
- Cinematography: Maria Rusche
- Edited by: Hanna A. Park
- Music by: Grant Fonda
- Production company: MXN Entertainment
- Distributed by: IFC Films
- Release dates: June 13, 2021 (Tribeca); September 10, 2021 (United States)
- Running time: 91 minutes
- Country: United States
- Language: English
- Box office: $47,215

Dating and New York is a 2021 American comedy film written and directed by Jonah Feingold in his directorial debut. It stars Jaboukie Young-White, Francesca Reale, Catherine Cohen, Brian Muller, Jerry Ferrara, Arturo Castro, Taylor Hill, Alex Moffat, Eva Victor and Yedoye Travis.

It had its world premiere at Tribeca Film Festival on June 13, 2021. It was released on September 10, 2021 by IFC Films.

== Cast ==
- Jaboukie Young-White as Milo Marks
- Francesca Reale as Wendy Brinkley
- Catherine Cohen as Jessie Katz
- Brian Muller as Hank Kadner
- Jerry Ferrara as Cole
- Arturo Castro as Bradley
- Taylor Hill as Olivia
- Jonah Feingold as Mort
- Alex Moffat as Trent 'The Rebounds' Wilkinson
- Eva Victor as Jenna 'The Rebounds' Brookes
- Yedoye Travis as Tripp

== Production ==
In December 2019, it was announced Jaboukie Young-White, Francesca Reale, Catherine Cohen, Brian Muller, Jerry Ferrara, Arturo Castro, Taylor Hill, Alex Moffat, Eva Victor and Yedoye Travis had joined the cast of the film, with Jonah Feingold directing from a screenplay he wrote.

Principal photography began in October 2019. The film was shot in New York at 22 locations in 15 days.

== Release ==
The film had its world premiere at the Tribeca Film Festival on June 13, 2021. Prior to the festival, IFC Films acquired distribution rights to the film. It was released in theaters by IFC Films on September 10, 2021.

== Reception ==
On the review aggregator website Rotten Tomatoes, 41% of 22 critics' reviews are positive, with an average rating of 5.3/10. Metacritic, which uses a weighted average, assigned the film a score of 42 out of 100 based on six critics, indicating "mixed or average" reviews.
