= Margo's Got Money Troubles (novel) =

2024 novel by Rufi Thorpe

- Author: Rufi Thorpe
- Publisher: Morrow/HarperCollins
- Publication date: June 11, 2024

Margo's Got Money Troubles is a 2024 novel by Rufi Thorpe. It was adapted into a television series of the same name that premiered on Apple TV in April 2026, with Elle Fanning starring as the titular character.

The novel was a finalist for the 2024 Kirkus Prize.
