= Diego (album) =

Studio album by Diego Boneta
- Released: 2005
- Recorded: 2005
- Genre: Latin pop
- Language: Spanish • Portuguese
- Label: EMI Music
- Producer: Cachorro López

Diego Boneta chronology
Diego (2005)	Indigo (2008)

Special Edition
- Diego (+D) Más

Diego is the debut studio album of Diego Boneta, released in 2005. At that time, Boneta was known as Diego González or, simply, Diego.

== Track listing ==
1. "Solo Existes Tú" (Bruno, Kara DioGuardi) – 3:05
2. "Responde" (Jade Ell, Mats Hedström) – 3:46
3. "Más" (Paulyna Carraz, Memo Méndez Guiu) – 3:47
4. "La Solución" (Leonel García, Nahuel Schajris) – 3:08
5. "No Quiero" (García) – 3:48
6. "Mi Revolución" (Cachorro López, Sebastián Schon) – 3:40
7. "Siempre Te Amaré" (Billy Méndez, Alex Sirvent) – 2:54
8. "Mientes" (Juan Gigena Abalos) – 2:56
9. "Me Muero sin Ti" (Charles Twong, Farhad Zand) – 2:56
10. "Te voy a Encontrar" (Mario Sandoval) – 3:27
11. "Desde Que Estás Aquí" (María Bernal) – 3:36

== Diego(+D) Más ==
Special Edition [Bonus Tracks]

1. "Más" [Versión Acústica] (Carraz, Guiu) – 3:32
2. "Más" [Remix] (Carraz, Guiu) – 6:20
3. "Responde" [En Portugués] (Ell, Hedström) – 2:57
4. "Más" [En Portugués] (Carraz, Guiu) – 3:50
5. "Solo Exsistes tú" [En Portugués] – 3:06

== Diego (Edição Brasil) – Portuguese version ==
1. "Quero só você" – 3:06
2. "Responde" – 3:47
3. "Mais" – 3:49
4. "Não vai ser fácil" – 3:8
5. "Revolução" – 3:39
6. "Sempre te amarei" – 2:55
7. "Mente" – 2:56
8. "Não posso viver sem você" – 2:53
9. "La Solución" (Spanish languaged bonus tracks) – 3:09
10. "Te voy a encontrar" (Spanish languaged bonus tracks) – 3:27
11. "Desde que estás aqui" (Spanish languaged bonus tracks) – 3:34

== Personnel ==
- Juan Gigena Abalos – guitar
- Dany Avila – drums
- Juan Blas Caballero – arranger, keyboards, programming, engineer, bass
- Silvio Furmanski – guitar
- Claudio Ledda - coros
- Alejandro Giacomán – mastering
- Diego Javier González – vocals
- Camilo Lara – executive producer, A&R
- Güido Laris – vocal director
- Olga Laris – photography
- Cachorro López – arranger, keyboards, programming, producer, Bass, musical direction, baritone guitar
- Melissa Mochulske – A&R
- Demian Nava – engineer
- Claudio Rabello – producer
- Joan Romagosa – producer
- Pablo López Ruiz – keyboards, programming
- Sebastián Schon – guitar, arranger, keyboards, programming, engineer
- Cesar Sogbe – mixing
- Guillermo Vadala – bass
