= Rufi Thorpe =

American novelist (born 1985)

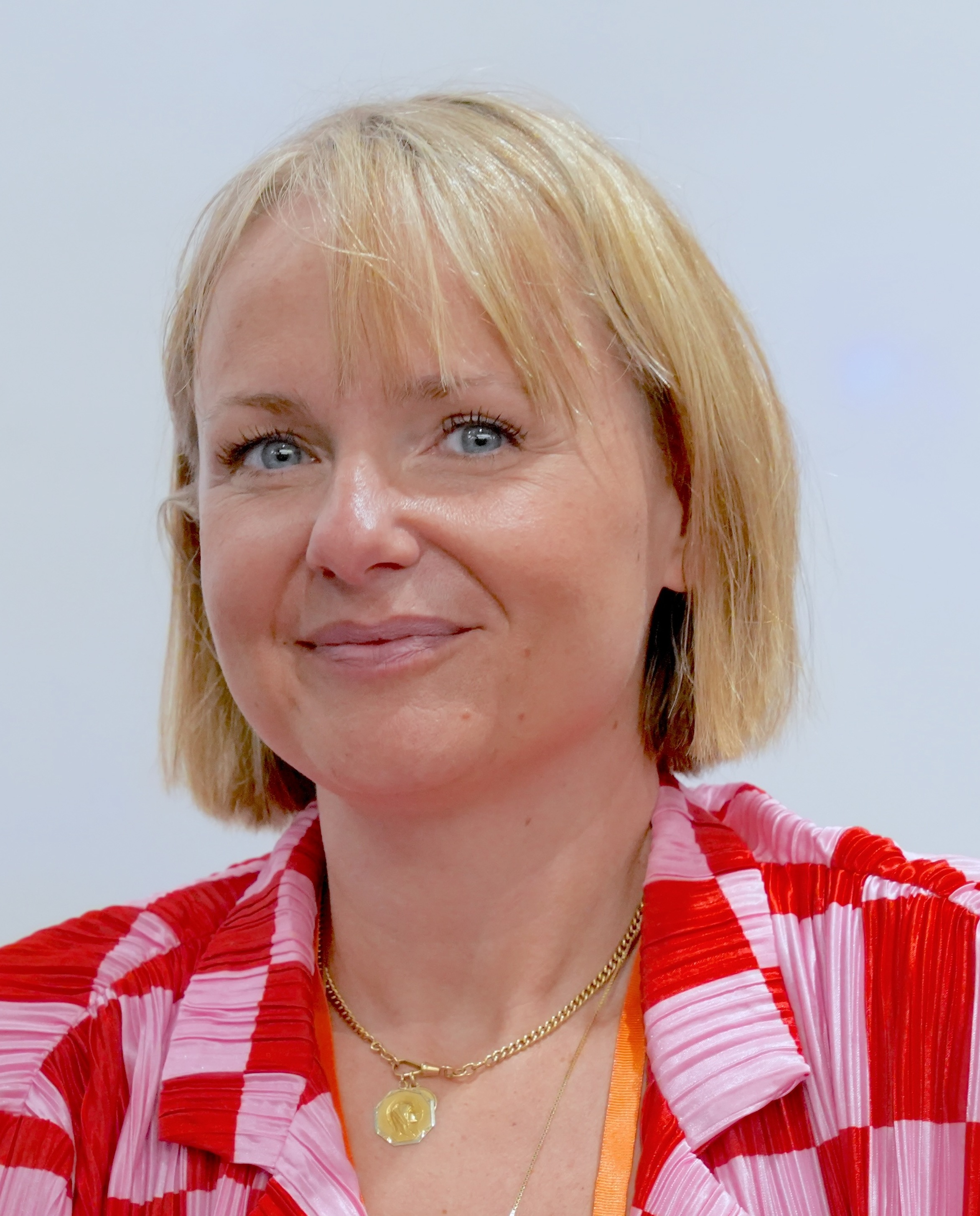
- Thorpe in 2025
- Born: 1985 (age 40–41) Dallas, Texas, US
- Area: Writer
- Notable works: Margo's Got Money Troubles

Rufi Thorpe (born 1985) is an American novelist and nonfiction writer. Her books have been longlisted or finalists for several literary awards including the International Dylan Thomas Prize, PEN/Faulkner Award, and Flaherty-Dunnan First Novel Prize. Her novel Margo's Got Money Troubles was a finalist for the Kirkus Prize and was adapted for television.

== Life and education ==
Thorpe was born in Dallas, but moved to Southern California starting at the age of 6, where she was raised by a single mother. She attended Phillips Exeter Academy, but left early to attend Eugene Lang College in New York where she studied philosophy and literature, graduating in 2006. She was a Henry Hoyns Fellow at the University of Virginia where she received a Master of Fine Arts in 2009. She lives in California with her husband and two sons.

== Writing career and bibliography ==
Thorpe is the author of four novels and has written for magazines, newspapers and online publications such as the New York Times, Vela, Poets & Writers and Literary Hub.

Her first novel, The Girls from Corona del Mar, Alfred A. Knopf (New York, NY), 2014, was longlisted for the International Dylan Thomas Prize and the Flaherty-Dunnan First Novel Prize.

Thorpe's next novel, Dear Fang, with Love, Alfred A. Knopf (New York, NY), 2016, was given a starred review by Publishers Weekly, and was said by Kirkus Reviews to be, "Melancholic and whimsical at once, Thorpe's novel is bumpy, quirky, and wholly original."

Knockout Queen, Alfred A. Knopf (New York, NY), 2020, was a finalist for the PEN/Faulkner Award.

Thorpe's book Margo's Got Money Troubles, William Morrow (New York, NY), June 11, 2024, has been adapted into a television series on Apple TV.

Accolades include:

- Finalist for the 2024 Kirkus Prize
- Finalist for the Goodreads Choice Awards
- Finalist for the 2025 Mark Twain American Voice in Literature Award
- Winner of the Libby Award for Best Book Club Book
- Book of the Month Club Pick
- LibraryReads Pick
- Time Magazine's 100 Must-Read Books of 2024
