= City of Dead Men =

2014 film

- Theatrical release poster
- Directed by: Kirk Sullivan
- Screenplay by: Andrew Poston
- Produced by: Alejo Arango; Laura Gómez Vargas
- Starring: Diego Boneta; Jackson Rathbone; María Mesa
- Cinematography: Joshua Reis
- Edited by: Harold Parker
- Music by: Camilo Posada
- Production company: Contento Films
- Distributed by: Signature Entertainment
- Release date: 15 November 2014 (Mórbido Fest)
- Running time: 87 minutes
- Countries: United States; Colombia
- Language: English

City of Dead Men is a horror film directed by Kirk Sullivan, marking Sullivan's directorial debut, and starring Diego Boneta, Jackson Rathbone and María Mesa. The film tells the story of Michael, an American traveler that arrives in Medellín where he meets Melody, who introduces him to a radical group of young men called "The Dead Men" who live in an abandoned psychiatric hospital.
