= Lindsey Normington =

American actor, stripper

- Born: 24 July 1996 (age 30); Grand Rapids, Michigan, U.S.
- Education: Grand Valley State University
- Organization: Actor's Equity
- Website: lindseynormington.com

Lindsey Elaine Normington (born 24 July 1996) is an actress, director, writer, and stripper best known for her role as Diamond, the antagonistic coworker of the titular character in Sean Baker's Palme d'Or and Academy Award-winning film Anora (2024). She also organized the first unionized strip club in the United States.

== Early life and education ==
Normington grew up in Rockford, Michigan. At age seven, she saw a high school production of Little Shop of Horrors which inspired her to perform in plays and musicals all throughout her childhood and teenage years. She graduated from Grand Valley State University in 2018, where she played Sally Bowles in a college production of Cabaret.

== Career ==
In 2018, as a senior at GVSU, she created a one-person show called Figurehead that was an official selection at the 2019 United Solo Festival in New York City, where she earned the award of Best Emerging Actress.

In 2023, Normington co-directed the narrative short How To (Without A Doubt) Get Rich And Famous In LA that won the Open Projector Night award from the Grand Rapids Film Society.

Normington has appeared on television as a background dancer in The Idol and Blindspotting, in music videos for Five Finger Death Punch, Ghost, Girl in Red, and She Past Away, as well as a lead actress in several short films. In 2024, she played a supporting role in Anora. In 2025, she had speaking roles in the HBO series Hacks and the CBS series Elsbeth and was added to the cast of Margot's Got Money Troubles.

=== Labor organizing ===
In 2023, she played an active role in organizing the only unionized strip club in the United States at the time, the Star Garden in North Hollywood.

== Filmography ==
=== Film and television ===
Year	Title	Role	Notes	Ref.
2016	Off Book	Marcie		
2019	Sandbagger	Lee		
2021	Blindspotting	Stripper (uncredited)	TV series; 1 episode	
2021	True Story	Stripper (uncredited)	TV mini series; 1 episode	
2022	Harry Potter and The Weekly Sessions	Ginny Weasley	TV mini series; 1 episode	
2022	All Rise	Eden Porter	TV series; 1 episode	
2023	Snuff Queen	Audrey Doe	Film	
2023	The Idol	Pole dancer	TV series; 2 episodes	
2024	Anora	Diamond	Film	
2025	Hacks	Cherry	TV series; 1 episodes	
2025	Elsbeth	Alaïa Jade	TV series; 1 episode	
2025	We'll Still Be Here	Mel	Short	
2026	Margo's Got Money Troubles	Rose	TV series; 4 episodes	
2026	Together Forever	Sydney	Short	
2026	Going Sane: The Rise and Fall of the Center for Feeling Therapy	Anonymous	Semi-documentary	
2026	Compliance	Sarah	Film	
2026	Lifewasters	Marna	Web short	
2026	Busboys	June	Film	

=== Music videos ===
Year	Artist	Song	Role
2021	Girl In Red	"I'll Call You Mine"	
2022	McKenna Michels	"Born to Die"	Faith
2023	Prof	"Judy"	Juror 5
2023	Five Finger Death Punch	"Judgement Day"	Female thug
2024	Eagles	"Hotel California" (Sphere residency)	Greek chorus: Lucille Ball
2024	She Past Away	"İnziva"	The Maiden
