= Tim Dillon (comedian) =

American comedian and podcaster (born 1985)

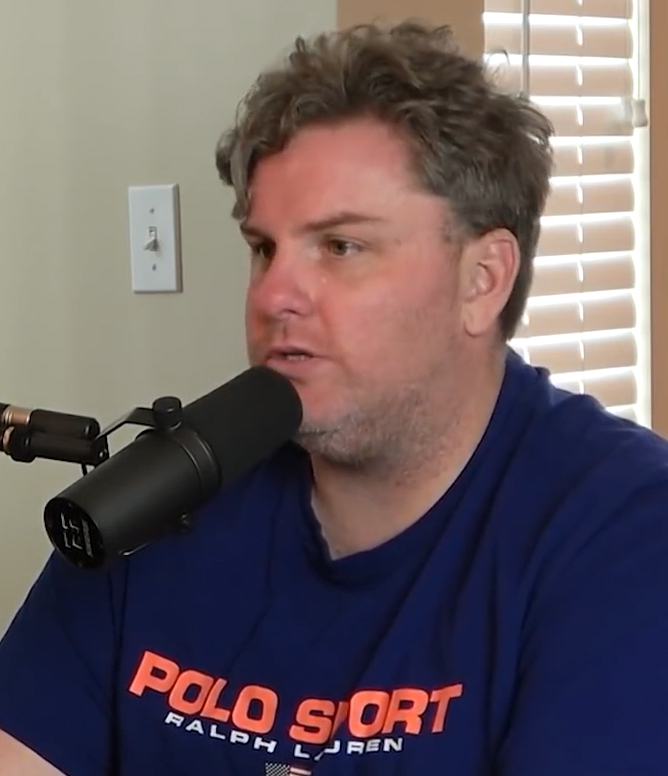
- Dillon in 2021
- Born: Tim J. Dillon; January 22, 1985 (age 41); Island Park, New York, U.S.
- Education: Nassau Community College
- Years active: 2010–present

Comedy career
- Medium: Stand-up; podcast
- Genres: Observational comedy; shock humor; insult comedy; satire; sketch comedy
- Subjects: Current events; culture; human behavior; self-deprecation; politics; American decline; religion

YouTube information
- Channel: The Tim Dillon Show
- Years active: 2016–present
- Subscribers: 1.09 million
- Views: 251.9 million
- Last updated: March 20, 2026
- Website: Official website

Tim J. Dillon (born January 22, 1985) is an American stand-up comedian and podcaster. He is the host of The Tim Dillon Show, a comedy podcast in which he discusses news, politics, and popular culture. Dillon began performing stand-up in New York City in 2010, and has since gained attention for his satirical style and commentary on contemporary issues.

== Early life ==
Dillon was born and raised in Island Park, New York. He is of Irish descent.

As a child in 1994, he landed a small role on the PBS children's show Sesame Street. Dillon said on The Joe Rogan Experience, "I was a child actor as a kid and I failed. I was on Sesame Street twice. I did the polka with Snuffleupagus."

Dillon attended Nassau Community College and won a Bronze Award in Impromptu Speaking in 2005.

== Career ==
Before becoming a professional comedian, Dillon worked as a New York City tour guide. He also worked as a mortgage broker, selling subprime mortgages prior to the 2008 financial crisis. He began performing stand-up around 2010. After a 2016 appearance at the Just for Laughs comedy festival in Montreal, Rolling Stone named Dillon as one of the "10 Comedians You Need to Know" in 2017. Along with Luis J. Gomez and Nick Mullen, Dillon was also a co-host of the Real Ass Podcast spin-off podcast Bastard Radio in 2020.

Vulture described Dillon in 2016 as "simultaneously a boisterous, conservative-leaning Long Island native and a thoughtful, homosexual foodie with a soft spot for frozen yogurt." Rolling Stone in 2017 described him as "capable of formulating an articulate (and often contrarian) opinion about anything at a moment's notice."

In August 2022, Dillon released his first standup special: Tim Dillon: A Real Hero.

=== The Tim Dillon Show podcast ===
The Tim Dillon Show
- Genre: Comedy; Talk; Entertainment; Culture
- Format: Audio & video
- Language: English

Creative team
- Created by: Tim Dillon

Cast and voices
- Hosted by: Tim Dillon

Production
- Length: 60 – 120 min.

Publication
- No. of episodes: 512 (as of September 12th, 2026)

Related
- Website: YouTube (video version); Spotify (audio version)

The Tim Dillon Show is a comedic video podcast hosted by Dillon that discusses events from his life and news topics that often revolve around American cultural issues, the entertainment industry, and politics. The Tim Dillon Show was originally named Tim Dillon Is Going to Hell, when the podcast was first launched on the GaS Digital Network and featured co-host and fellow Long Island-based comedian Ray Kump.

=== 2025 Riyadh Comedy Festival controversy ===
In late August 2025, Dillon defended his decision to appear at the Riyadh Comedy Festival in Riyadh, Saudi Arabia, by saying that the Saudis were paying him enough money (US$375,000) to "look the other way." In September 2025, Dillon announced that he had been fired from the Riyadh Comedy Festival for making jokes about forced labor in Saudi Arabia on the August 30 episode of his podcast.

== Political views ==
Dillon said in 2016, "I'm politically all over the map, though I lean conservative", and "I don't think politically I line up with anything." He said he did not vote in the 2020 U.S. elections, disapproving of both candidates, Donald Trump and Joe Biden.

Dillon interviewed Republican vice presidential nominee JD Vance on his podcast, the week before the 2024 United States presidential election.

== Personal life ==
As of March 2021, he resides in Los Angeles, after briefly living in Austin, Texas. At age 25, he came out as gay.

== Filmography ==
=== Film ===
Year	Title	Role	Notes
2009	Boston Psychiatric	Bruce the Bartender	
2018	Anything Boys Can Do	Co-Worker	
2020	Timing	Tim	
2023	Thanksgiving	Manny	
2024	Joker: Folie à Deux	Arkham Guard	
2026	Busboys	Tim, Manager of the Restaurant	

=== Television ===
Year	Title	Role	Notes
1994	Sesame Street	Himself/uncredited child	
2016	Above Average Presents	Fan	Episode: "Fans Who Booed Porzingis: Where are they Now?"
2016	Thanksgiving	Himself	Episode: "Politics"
2016	Hardest Jobs in Sports	Super Bowl Party Chicken Wing Butcher	
2018	Resolutions	Boss	
2018	You Didn't Want to Know	Himself	Episode: "Baby Tossing"
2018	Dollar Store Therapist	Tim	Episode: "Insults"
2022	Tim Dillon: A Real Hero	Himself	Netflix standup special
2024	Tim Dillon: This Is Your Country	Himself	Netflix standup special
2025	Tim Dillon: I'm Your Mother	Himself	Netflix standup special
