= Arturo Castro (Guatemalan actor) =

Guatemalan actor (born 1985)

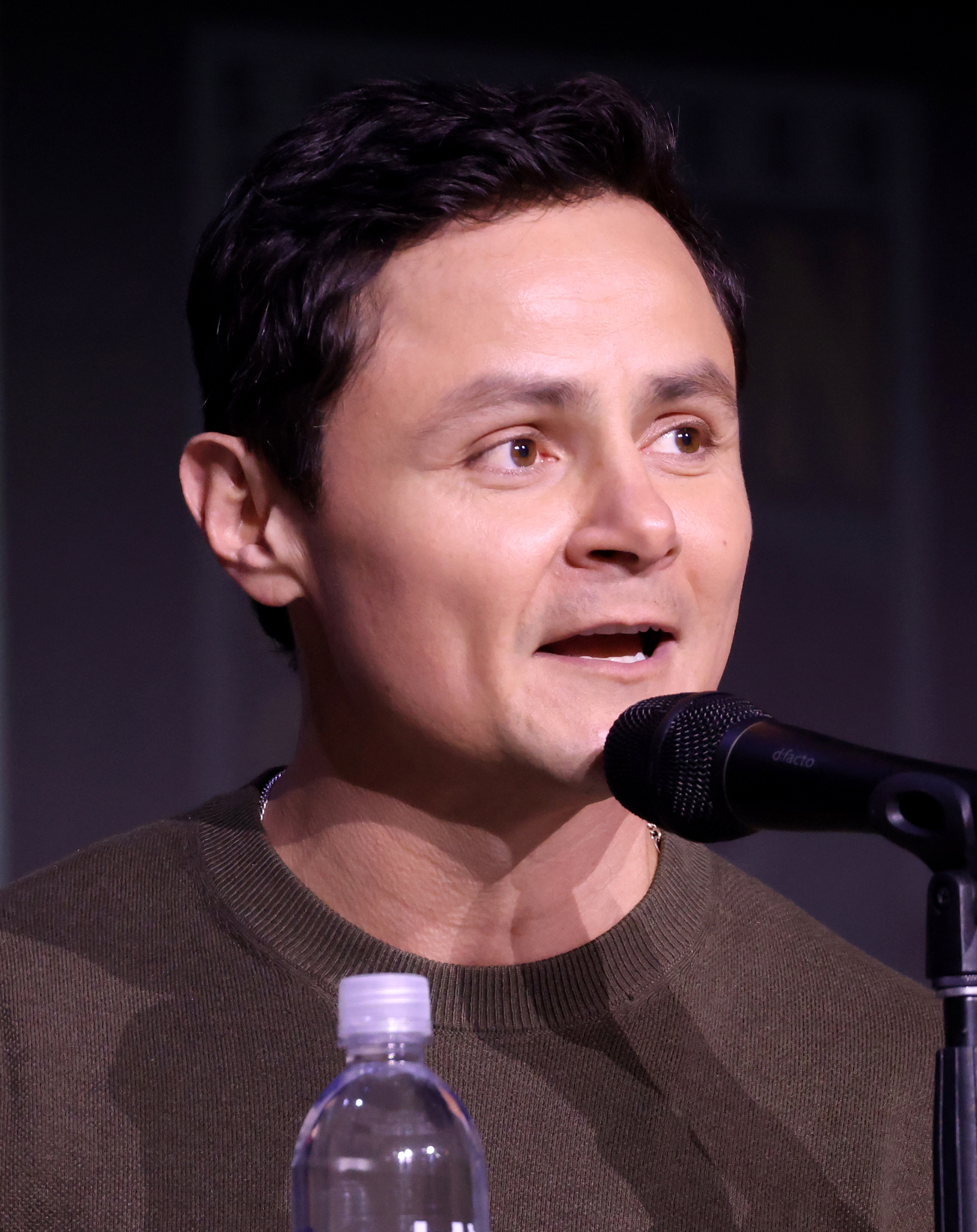
- Castro at the 2025 San Diego Comic-Con
- Born: November 26, 1985 (age 40); Guatemala City, Guatemala
- Occupation: Actor
- Years active: 2008–present
- Known for: Jaimé Castro on Broad City; David Rodríguez on Narcos; Pablo Escobar in Weird: The Al Yankovic Story

Arturo Castro (born November 26, 1985) is a Guatemalan actor best known for his portrayal of Jaimé Castro on the Comedy Central series Broad City, David Rodríguez on the Netflix series Narcos, and Pablo Escobar in The Roku Channel film Weird: The Al Yankovic Story.

== Career ==
Castro hosted his own show, Conexion, on Guatemala's national network, a year before moving to New York City. In New York, he attended the American Academy of Dramatic Arts, where he met Abbi Jacobson and Ilana Glazer and landed the role of Jaimé in Broad City. Castro had one of the leading roles in Ang Lee's war drama Billy Lynn's Long Halftime Walk, playing Marcellino "Mango" Montoya, a member of Billy Lynn's Bravo Squad.

In 2017 Arturo landed a role as David Rodríguez, son of Cali Cartel kingpin Miguel Rodríguez Orejuela, in season 3 of the Netflix series Narcos. He also played Jose in Bushwick, a film about 20-year-old Lucy and war veteran Stupe depending on each other for survival when a Texas military force invades their Brooklyn neighborhood.

Castro created and starred in Comedy Central's Alternatino with Arturo Castro, a sketch comedy show centering on life as a modern Mestizo man. The show premiered in June 2019 and ran for one season. He played officer Jones in Yes Day, sharing screen with Jennifer Garner.

== Influences ==
Castro cites Eddie Izzard and Al Pacino as major acting and comedic influences.

== Filmography ==
Key
†	Denotes films that have not yet been released

=== Film ===
Year	Title	Role	Notes
2012	Indigo Children	Armand	
2014	Sun Belt Express	Miguel	
2016	Ace the Case	Juan	
2016	Billy Lynn's Long Halftime Walk	"Mango" Montoya	
2017	Bushwick	Jose	
2017	Deidra & Laney Rob a Train	McMillan	
2017	Snatched	Dr. Armando	
2019	The Informer	Daniel Gomez	
2019	Semper Fi	"Snowball"	
2019	Lady and the Tramp	Joe	
2020	The Broken Hearts Gallery	Marcos	
2021	Yes Day	Officer Jones	
2021	Dating and New York	Bradley	
2022	Weird: The Al Yankovic Story	Pablo Escobar	
2022	The Menu	Soren	
2023	Molli and Max in the Future	Walter	
2023	White Men Can't Jump	Bobby	
2024	Road House	Moe	
2024	The Present	Dr. Polhemus	
2024	Operation Taco Gary's	Tiago	
2025	Tron: Ares	Seth	
2025	Untitled Home Invasion Romance	Ernie Guerra	
2025	The Room Returns!	Steven	
2025	The SpongeBob Movie: Search for SquarePants	Ride Operator	
2026	Mike & Nick & Nick & Alice	Dumbass Tony	
2026	Matchbox: The Movie †	Ted	Post-production
2027	A Place in Hell †	TBA	Post-production

=== Television ===
Year	Title	Role	Notes
2009–2013	We Speak NYC	Jorge / Fredy	Episode: "Love and Money" & "The Storm"
2012	The Pack	Juan	
2013	Lady Business	Tyler	2 episodes
2014	2040	Arturo Winthrop	
2014–2019	Broad City	Jaimé Castro	25 episodes
2015	The Good Wife	Juan, The Dishwasher	Episode: "The Debate"
2015	Sex & Drugs & Rock & Roll	Pizza Guy	Episode: "Doctor Doctor"
2015–2016	Alternatino	Arturo	Web series, 6 episodes
2016	Invented Today	Hamilton	
2017	Narcos	David Rodríguez	10 episodes
2017	No Activity	Miguel	7 episodes
2018	Ghost Story Club	Gary	8 episodes
2019	Dollar Store Therapist	Arturo	Episode: "Sharks"
2019	Alternatino with Arturo Castro	Various	10 episodes; also creator and executive producer
2019	Room 104	Craig	Episode: "Itchy"
2019	Silicon Valley	Máximo Reyes	3 episodes
2019–2020	Elena of Avalor	Felipe (voice)	2 episodes
2020	American Dad!	Colombian Villager (voice)	Episode: "100 Years a Solid Fool"
2020	Flipped	Diego	6 episodes
2020	At Home with Amy Sedaris	Castrodamus	Episode: "New Year's"
2021	Mr. Corman	Victor	8 episodes
2022	Is It Cake?	Himself (judge)	Episode: "Cake Crashers"
2022	The Proud Family: Louder and Prouder	Neato Tito (voice)	Episode: "Get In"
2022	Entergalactic	Len (voice)	TV special
2022	The Recruit	Sandoval Luna	Episode: "I.C.I.N.C."
2022–2026	The Terminal List	Jordan Groff	5 episodes
2023	History of the World, Part II	Private Martinez	Episode: "II"
2023	Archer	El Cambiante (voice)	Episode: "Face Off"
2023	The Great American Baking Show: Celebrity Holiday	Himself (contestant)	TV special
2023–2025	Family Guy	(voice)	2 episodes
2024	The Vince Staples Show	Police Officer	Episode: "Pink House"
2025	Bad Thoughts	James Gonzalez / Jose	2 episodes

=== Web ===
Year	Title	Role	Notes
2026	Backyard Sports: The Animated Special	Pablo Sanchez (voice)	Animated special
