= At Midnight (2023 film) =

- Poster
- Directed by: Jonah Feingold
- Screenplay by: Jonah Feingold; Maria Hinojos; Giovanni M. Porta
- Story by: Giovanni M. Porta; Diego Boneta
- Produced by: Diego Boneta; Eréndira Núñez Larios; David Bernon; Josh Glick; Brian Kavanaugh-Jones; Fred Berger
- Starring: Diego Boneta; Monica Barbaro
- Cinematography: Chuy Chávez
- Edited by: Veronica Rutledge
- Music by: Grant Fonda
- Production companies: Paramount International Networks; Three Amigos
- Distributed by: Paramount+
- Release date: February 10, 2023
- Running time: 100 minutes
- Country: Mexico
- Languages: English; Spanish

At Midnight is 2023 Mexican-American romantic comedy film directed by Jonah Feingold from a script he co-wrote with Maria Hinojos and Giovanni M. Porta. The film stars Monica Barbaro and Diego Boneta, who also produced. The film was released on Paramount+ on February 10, 2023.

== Premise ==
Sophie Wilder is in Mexico City filming Super Society 3 and hopes to get her own spin-off. While shooting, she catches her boyfriend and co-star, Adam, cheating on her with a crew member. As Sophie struggles to figure out how she can move forward, she meets Alejandro, a junior manager at a hotel used for the production. A deep friendship develops between Sophie and Alejandro as they try to figure out how things can develop in their limited time together.

== Cast ==
- Diego Boneta as Alejandro
- Monica Barbaro as Sophie Wilder
- Anders Holm as Adam
- Whitney Cummings
- Catherine Cohen
- Casey Thomas Brown
- Maya Zapata
- Fernando Carsa
- Dazelle Yvette as Deborah Jackson IMDB
- Ricardo Esquerra
- Matt Ramos as a fan critic for Super Society

== Production ==
At Midnight was first written by Giovanni M. Porta with Diego Boneta. Jonah Feingold later signed on to direct and helped write a second draft with Maria Hinojos. Most of the film's starring cast was announced February 2022 as it began shooting in Mexico in February 2022.

The film was written with a desire to showcase the beauty of Mexico that is often overshadowed by its frequent portrayal as a desert. The goal was to have Mexico City feel like another character in the film akin to portrayals of Paris or New York. Director Jonah Feingold credited his Mexican production crew, Diego Boneta, and cinematographer Chuy Chávez with helping him capture the aesthetic of the city.

== Release ==
At Midnight was released simultaneously to regions around the world on February 10, 2023, for streaming on Paramount+.

== Reception ==
On the review aggregator website Rotten Tomatoes, 40% of 35 critics' reviews are positive, with an average rating of 5.2/10. The website's consensus reads: "Diego Boneta and Monica Barbaro are appealing, well-matched leads -- here's hoping they reunite for a picture better than the strained and predictable At Midnight." Writing for Variety, Courtney Howard felt that it was a formulaic romantic comedy, but she praised the performances of Boneta and Barbaro, highlighting the chemistry between the two. G. Allen Johnson of the San Francisco Chronicle praised the performances by the cast, especially Barbaro's, but called the scripted story "daffy".
