= EXmas =

2023 film by Jonah Feingold

- Release poster
- Directed by: Jonah Feingold
- Written by: Dan Steele
- Produced by: Jason Moring; Michael Philip; Richard Alan Reid
- Starring: Leighton Meester; Robbie Amell; Michael Hitchcock; Kathy Greenwood
- Cinematography: Stephen Whitehead
- Edited by: Yvette Amirian
- Music by: Grant Fonda
- Production companies: BuzzFeed Studios; CR8IV DNA
- Distributed by: Amazon Freevee
- Release date: November 17, 2023
- Running time: 93 minutes
- Country: United States
- Language: English

EXmas is a 2023 American Christmas romantic comedy film directed by Jonah Feingold, starring Leighton Meester and Robbie Amell. It was released on Amazon Freevee on November 17, 2023.

Graham decides to surprise his family by traveling home for Christmas, only to discover that his ex-fiancee Ali is the guest of honor.

== Plot ==
Six months after breaking off their engagement, Ali and Graham separately reminisce about their time together as Christmas approaches. As Ali bakes, she laments to her friends about giving up her ex-fiancé's loving family, while Graham works nonstop as a game developer. His boss moves up his work deadline to Christmas so Graham tells his family that he will be unable to leave LA.

Regretting his choice, Graham flies to Minnesota as a surprise for his family only to find Ali there. Sheepishly his mother, Jeannie, and sister, Mindy, reveal that they invited Ali and gave her his childhood bedroom. Later he finds out that his father, Dennis, and brother, Elliot, have also stayed in touch with her. Graham decides to stay and make Ali look bad to force his family choose him over her. Realizing what he's up to, Ali makes a bet with him to see who can win over the family. The two then engage in childish sabotage to outdo each other.

At the annual Stroop Christmas party Ali meets Brady, Graham's old high school rival who now works for Dennis. Meanwhile, Graham hits it off with Jess, a local. Later that night they all go to a bar where Ali and Graham try to make each other jealous. In the midst of their hijinks, Mindy reveals that she has broken up with her girlfriend, Heather, so Graham and Ali both comfort her.

The next day, the competition continues as the family prepares for Christmas Eve dinner. Graham sabotages Ali by using up all the butter, so she finds a jar of butter to use for her cookies instead. At dinner, Brady and Jess unexpectedly join. Graham and Jess refuse to eat dessert as everyone enjoys Ali's cookies only for the group to realize that she used THC butter. While everyone else is stoned Graham accidentally reveals Mindy's breakup to his parents, dampening the mood. Graham and Jess leave to go clubbing where she reveals that she wants him to join her for a threesome. Deciding he can't go through with it, Graham heads home. Meanwhile, realizing Brady only wants her to buy a car from him, Ali leaves him and goes to bed.

Graham drunkenly stumbles into his childhood bed, waking Ali up. The two begin arguing which culminates in a kiss. The next morning, they wake up cuddling only for Jeannie to barge into the room with breakfast. As Ali hides under the covers, Jeannie gives Graham advice about Ali which both take to heart. At church, Graham attempts to talk to Ali about the prior night and says that he's willing to forgive her for dumping him. She retorts that perhaps he is the one that needs her forgiveness.

As the family go to the local ice rink to play Christmas hockey together, Dennis suddenly has a heart attack. Graham immediately administers CPR, saving his life. At the hospital while Dennis recovers, Ali and Graham have a truce and wish each other the best.

The next morning Ali says a tearful farewell to the whole family and heads to the airport. Finally realizing he can't let her go, Graham races to stop her only to find her back on the doorstep. After giving an impassioned speech, the pair finally get back together.

A year later the family celebrate Christmas in LA at Graham and Ali's new house. The pair are engaged once more, Graham has his own business and Ali finally gets her food truck.

In a post-credits scene, two years have gone by and the family is celebrating Christmas in LA once again. Hearing a knock at the door, Mindy and Graham, who is carrying his baby, go to open it only to see Heather on their doorstep. Graham reveals that he invited her as revenge.

== Cast ==
- Leighton Meester as Ali Moyer, Graham's ex-fiancee
- Robbie Amell as Graham Stroop
- Michael Hitchcock as Dennis Stroop, Graham's father
- Kathryn Greenwood as Jeannie Stroop, Graham's mother
- Veronika Slowikowska as Mindy Stroop, Graham's sister
- Steven Huy as Elliott Stroop
- Thomas Cadrot as Brady
- Emily Schoen as Quinn
- Donna Benedicto as Jess
- Rachel Risen as Neethal
- Spencer John Borgeson as Randy

== Production ==
On October 17, 2023, it was announced that BuzzFeed Studios' Christmas film EXmas, starring Leighton Meester and Robbie Amell, would premiere on Amazon Freevee. It was written by Dan Steele and directed by Jonah Feingold, and also stars Michael Hitchcock, Kathy Greenwood, Veronika Slowikowska, and Steven Huy. It was produced by Richard Alan Reid, Michael Philip, and Jason Moring.

== Release ==
The trailer was released on October 17, 2023. The film was released on Amazon Freevee on November 17, 2023.

On the review aggregator website Rotten Tomatoes, 44% of 16 critics' reviews are positive, with an average rating of 5.6/10.
