= Jonah Feingold =

American filmmaker

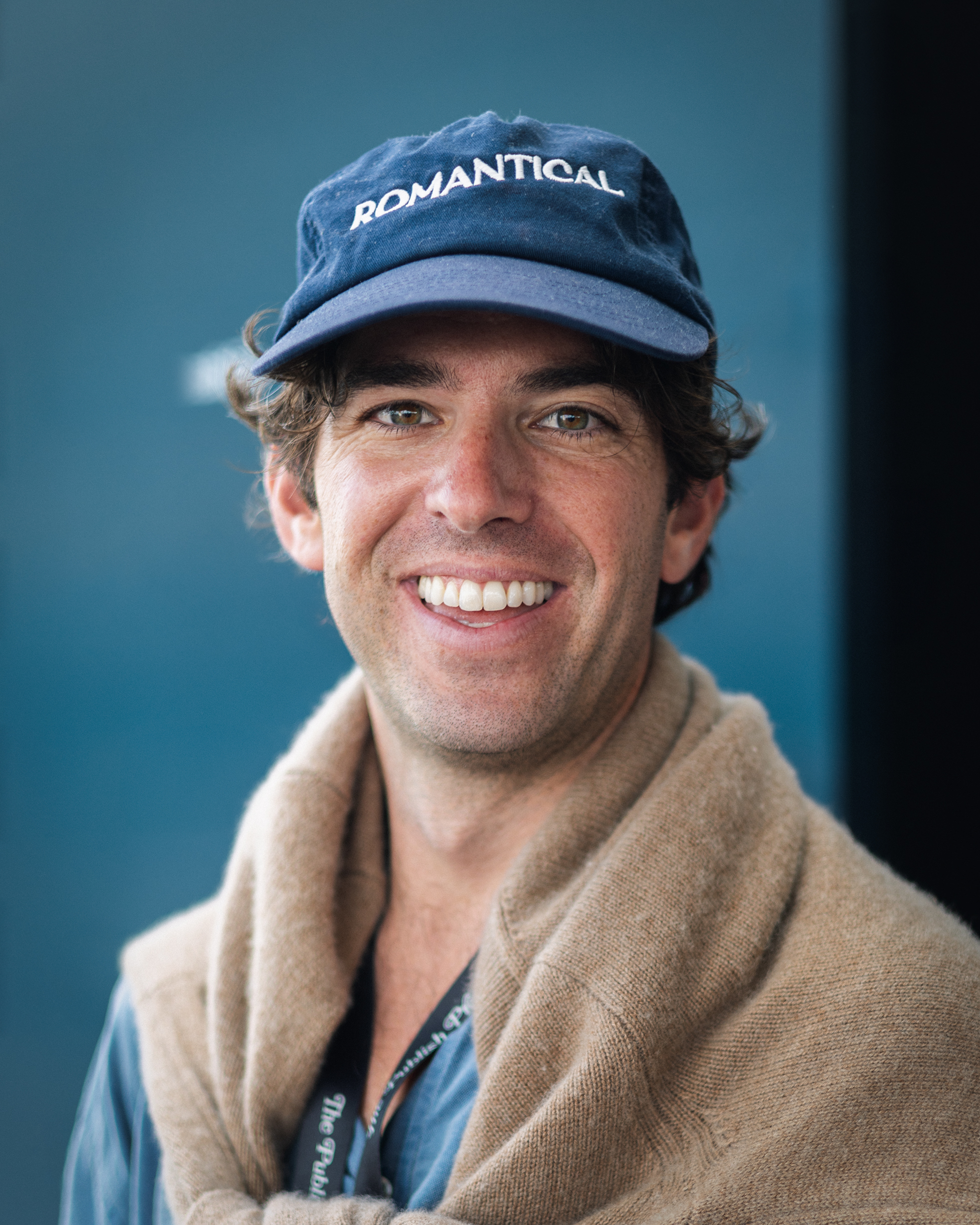
- Born: New York City, U.S.
- Occupation: Filmmaker
- Years active: 2014–present
- Known for: Star Wars Wes Anderson; Dating & New York; At Midnight; EXmas

Jonah Feingold (born in New York City) is an American filmmaker and former podcaster.

== Career ==
In 2014, Feingold released the video Star Wars Wes Anderson which parodied the trailer of the upcoming Star Wars movie and quickly became popular online.

In 2015, he created the short film Letters to Manhattan (A Whole Foods Love Story).

In June 2017, he launched with Dante Basco the film project Bangarang which spins off the character Rufio, thug leader of the Lost Boys, from the 1991 movie Hook. The development of the project started with a Kickstarter campaign.

In 2017, Feingold wrote and directed his debut feature film, Dating & New York. It stars Jaboukie Young-White and Francesca Reale, and premiered at the Tribeca Film Festival on June 13, 2021. Prior to the festival, the film's rights were acquired by IFC Films. Also in 2020, Feingold began co-hosting the Hinge-produced relationship podcast Dating Sucks with Ilana Dunn. The partnership began when the two went on a date after meeting on the dating app, who Dunn was working for as a content producer at the time; while they both decided that neither were ready for a relationship, they decided to stay friends and build a podcast together. Due to the COVID-19 pandemic, the show ended after 10 episodes, and Dunn was let go from Hinge, leading to the two starting a new podcast under a new name, Seeing Other People. Feingold left the podcast in 2021 to focus full-time on his film career.

On February 10, 2023, Feingold's second feature film, At Midnight, premiered on Paramount+. He directed the Christmas film EXmas, which premiered on Amazon Freevee on November 17, 2023.

In 2025, Feingold wrote, directed and starred in the independent romantic comedy feature film 31 Candles, which was acquired by Level 33 Entertainment. It premiered at the Miami Jewish Film Festival on January 11, 2025. Also in 2025, he released the independent micro-feature Good to See You, which he wrote, directed, and starred in. It was made available to stream for free on YouTube starting on July 21, 2025.

Feingold based the film's delayed bar mitzvah premise partly on his own experience of not having the ceremony as a child because of dyslexia.

== Filmography ==
Year	Title	Director	Writer	Producer	Notes
2021	Dating & New York	Yes	Yes	Yes	
2023	At Midnight	Yes	Yes	No	
2023	EXmas	Yes	No	No	
2025	31 Candles	Yes	Yes	No	Also starred in
2025	Good to See You	Yes	Yes	Yes	Also starred in
2026	Busboys	Yes	No	No	
