= Diego Boneta =

Mexican actor and singer (born 1993)

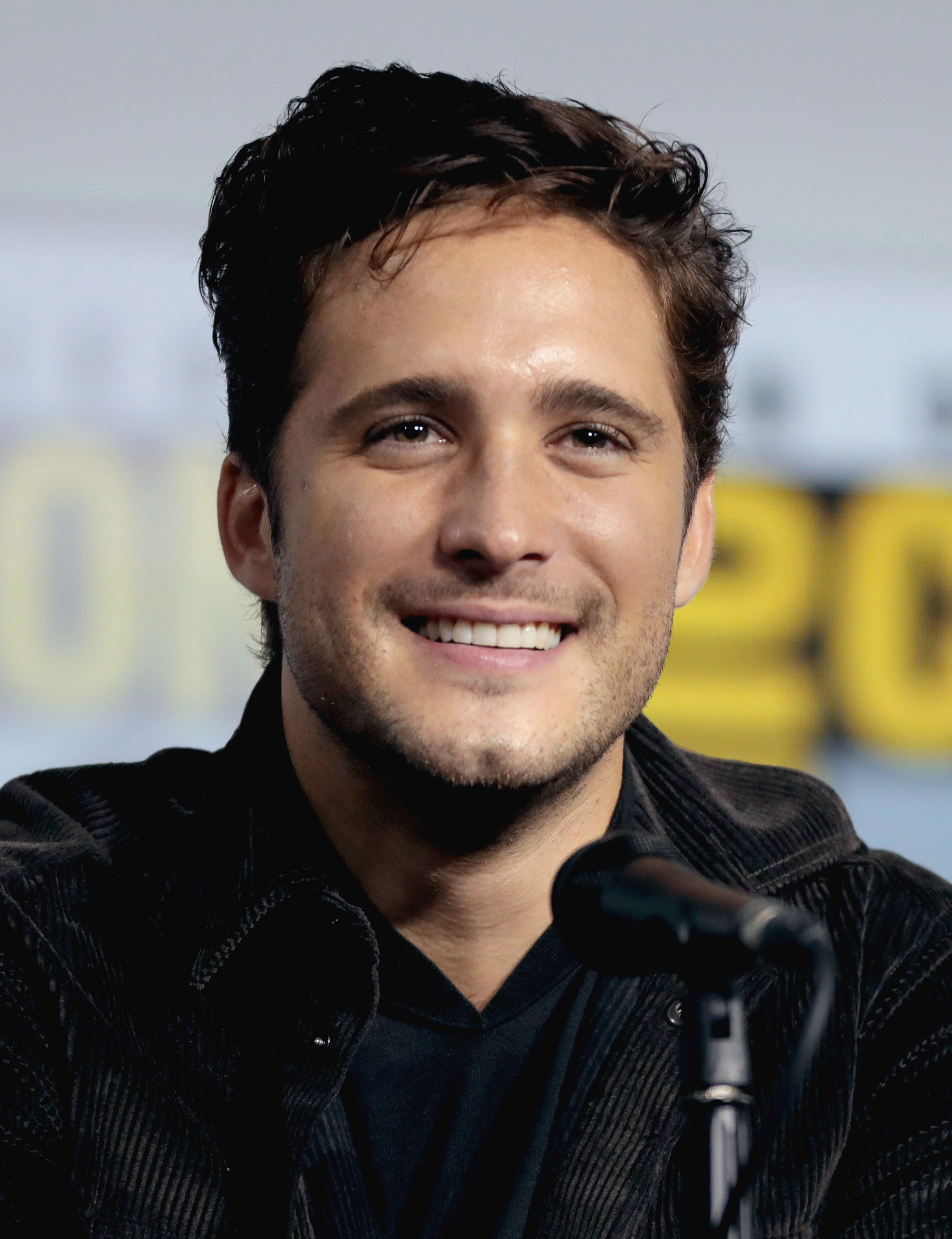
- Boneta in 2019
- Born: Diego Andrés González Boneta; 29 November 1990 (age 35); Mexico City, Mexico
- Citizenship: Mexico
- Occupations: Singer-songwriter; actor
- Years active: 2002–present
- Musical career
- Genre: Latin pop
- Label: EMI
- Website: diegoboneta.com

Diego Andrés González Boneta (born 29 November 1990) is a Mexican actor, producer and singer. He gained wider recognition after starring in Rock of Ages (2012) alongside Tom Cruise and in the Netflix biographical series Luis Miguel: The Series (2018). He also starred in the romantic comedy films Father of the Bride (2022), and At Midnight (2023).

He recorded his self-titled debut album with his first single, "Responde" in 2006. A Brazilian version of the album with songs in Portuguese was recorded in 2006. In 2008, he released his second album titled Indigo.

== Early life ==
Boneta was born in Mexico City, the son of two engineers: Lauro González, who was born in Mexico City, and Astrid Boneta. He has two siblings. Although he never knew his maternal grandfather, Otto Boneta, a songwriter and psychiatrist, Diego credits him with his musical talents. Boneta grew up between Mexico City and Los Angeles, California.

Boneta speaks Spanish and English fluently.

== Acting career ==
He started his career in Mexico singing and acting. He worked extensively in television and appeared in the reality show Código F.A.M.A.. He did two children's telenovelas: Alegrijes y rebujos and Misión S.O.S with Allison Lozz which were shown on Univision. He was also in the teenage-oriented telenovela Rebelde. In 2010, at the age of 20 years, he appeared in the TV series Pretty Little Liars as Alex Santiago and in 90210 as Javier Luna which was "practically me with a different name" where he could sing and compose, mainly "Siempre tú" which came out at the end of the second season and the beginning of the third. His first film came in 2011 as Tyler Adams in the teen flick Mean Girls 2 opposite Meaghan Martin and Jennifer Stone. Martin was the only actor he knew at that time, he recalled it was really easy to work with her because they were friends. The film also gave him the opportunity to experience high school for the first time, as he was tutored while working.

As he shot into the spotlight he became the cover model of TROIX magazine's 'March Men Madness' 2011 issue, introducing him as "Prince Charming". His big Hollywood break came when he starred in Adam Shankman's film adaptation of the hit Broadway musical Rock of Ages alongside Tom Cruise and Julianne Hough. He played Drew Boley, a young upstart in Los Angeles in the late 1980s with dreams of becoming a rock star. Of Boneta's audition, Shankman called him the "next big thing" and compared him to Zac Efron, Channing Tatum, and Liam Hemsworth.

In 2012, Diego starred in the MTV series Underemployed. In this 12-episode series, Boneta played Miles González, a hilarious stripper. In 2014, Boneta was featured in Abercrombie & Fitch's "Making of a Star" campaign. As a result, photos of Boneta shot by Bruce Weber were featured in A&F stores worldwide. In 2015, Boneta played warrior Amram in the mini-series The Dovekeepers, and recorded the song "The Warrior" which was used as the series' opening theme. Between September and December 2015, he starred in Ryan Murphy's comedy-horror series Scream Queens for the Fox network. The show featured an all-star cast including Ariana Grande, Keke Palmer, Nick Jonas, Emma Roberts, Jamie Lee Curtis and Lea Michele.

Boneta played Luis Miguel, the Grammy award-winning artist in the TV bio-musical series, Luis Miguel: The Series. The show is based on the early career of the famous Mexican artist. The series officially premiered on April 22, 2018 on Telemundo and Netflix, with its second season premiering in April 2021.

In 2022 he starred in the romantic comedy remake Father of the Bride (2022) portraying the romantic interest opposite Adria Arjona. The film also starred Andy Garcia and Gloria Estefan. The film was released on HBO Max and received positive reviews. The following year he starred in the Paramount+ romantic comedy At Midnight (2023) alongside Monica Barbaro. The film received mixed reviews for its story but also earned praise for the chemistry between the two leads. Boneta produced the film and received a story credit for writing the original draft of the film.

In 2023 and 2024, Diego became Lexus Mexico Voice.

== Music career ==
=== Diego ===
During his stint in Rebelde, he released his debut album, titled Diego, in Mexico, Chile and Brazil in 2006. The album was available for digital sale on April 3, 2006 and released in the United States on April 24. The first single, "Responde", became a top ten single in various countries including Argentina and Brazil. His songs were synchronized in the telenovela Rebelde and, once finished, he went on an international tour with Mexican pop group RBD as a guest. "It was a really cool experience, because in countries like Brazil or Romania everybody sang my songs in Spanish," he said.

When promoting his first album in Mexico he opened three concerts (in Mexico City, Guadalajara and Monterrey) for Hilary Duff in 2006.

=== Indigo ===
His second album, titled Indigo, was released on 25 March 2008. It features the single "Perdido en Ti" and "Losing Me", and is produced by Mitch Allan and written by Allan and Kara DioGuardi. On 5 May 2008, "Losing Me" and "Perdido En Ti" became iTunes Free Single of the Week.

== Writing career ==
On May 1, 2025, Diego's debut thriller novel, "The Undoing of Alejandro Velasco", will be published by Amazon Crossing.

== Filmography ==
=== Film ===
Year	Title	Role	Notes
2012	Rock of Ages	Drew Boley	
2014	City of Dead Men	Michael	
2015	Eden	Arnie	
2015	Summer Camp	Will	
2016	Pelé: Birth of a Legend	José Altafini	
2017	Before I Fall	Mr. Daimler	
2017	The Reason You Haven't Had Sex in So Long	Gary	Short film
2017	Another You	Marcus	Also associate producer
2017	The Titan	Íker Hernández	
2017	Blood Ride	Brian	
2017	A Bend in the Road		
2018	The Reason Nobody Likes You	Isaac	Short film
2018	Monster Party	Ollie	
2019	Terminator: Dark Fate	Diego Ramos	
2020	Revenge Ride	Brian	
2020	New Order	Daniel	
2020	Love, Weddings & Other Disasters	Mack	
2020	Monster Hunter	Marshall	
2021	Die in a Gunfight	Ben Gibbon	
2022	Father of the Bride	Adan Castillo	
2023	At Midnight	Alejandro	Also co-writer and producer
2025	Juegos de Seducción	Sebastián	
2026	Starbright	Joshua	
2026	Killing Castro	Fidel Castro	

=== Television ===
Year	Title	Role	Notes
2002–03	Código F.A.M.A.	Himself	Reality show/Contest
2003–04	Alegrijes y rebujos	Ricardo Sánchez	
2004–05	Misión S.O.S	Christian Martínez	
2005–06	Rebelde	Rocco Bezauri	Season 2-3
2005	La energía de Sonric'slandia	Himself	Episode: "Ele"
2010	Zeke and Luther	Tiki Delgado	Episode: "Kojo's BFF"
2010	90210	Javier Luna	5 episodes
2010	Pretty Little Liars	Alex Santiago	5 episodes
2011	Mean Girls 2	Tyler Adams	Television film
2012	Made in Hollywood	Himself	Archive footage
2012–13	Underemployed	Miles	12 episodes
2015	The Dovekeepers	Amram	2 episodes
2015	Scream Queens	Pete Martinez	Main role (season 1): 10 episodes
2016	Jane the Virgin	Dax	Episode: "Chapter Thirty-Two"
2017	Latin American Music Awards	Host	Award show
2018–21	Luis Miguel: The Series	Luis Miguel Gallego Basteri	Main role; also executive producer
2024	Who Killed Him?	Jorge Gil	Main role
TBA	El Gato	Frank Guerrero / El Gato Negro	Main role; also executive producer

== Discography ==
Diego discography
- Studio albums: 3
- Singles: 7
- Music videos: 5

=== Studio albums ===
Title	Album details
Diego	Released: 2006 (Mexico) July 10, 2006 (Brazil) August, 2006 (Chile) April 24, 2007 (United States); Formats: CD; Label: EMI Music; Language: Spanish language
Diego (Portuguese edition)	Released: July 10, 2006 (Brazil); Formats: CD; Label: EMI Music; Language: Portuguese & Spanish
Indigo	Released: March 25, 2008 (Mexico); Formats: CD; Label: EMI Music; Language: Spanish & English

=== Video albums ===
Title	Album details	Notes
Diego - En Vivo En El Maracanã	Released: December 2006; Formats: DVD	Tracklist: Solo Existes Tú; La Solución; Mais; Responde; Bonus: Responde (studio version); Más (studio version); Extras: Bastidores; Diego en Brasil; Galeria de Fotos

=== Singles ===
Title	Year	Album
"Aquí Voy"	2005	Non-album single
"Responde"	2006	Diego
"Más"	2006	Diego
"Solo Existes Tú"	2007	Diego
"Perdido En Ti"	2008	Indigo
"Millón De Años"	2008	Indigo
"Siempre Tú"	2010	Non-album single
"The Warrior"	2015	Non-album single
"The Hurt"	2015	Non-album single
"Éramos Algo"	2016	Non-album single
"Ur Love"	2016	Non-album single

== Music videos ==
List of music videos, showing year released and director
Title	Year	Director(s)
"Responde"	2006	—N/a
"Más"	2006	—N/a
"Solo Existes Tú"	2007	—N/a
"Perdido En Ti"	2008	—N/a
"Millón De Años"	2008	—N/a
"About You Now"	2008	Miranda Cosgrove
"The Warrior"	2015	—N/a
"The Hurt"	2015	—N/a

=== Soundtrack ===
Year	Title	Song	Notes
2010	90210	"One More Time"	Uncredited
2010	90210	"Fade Away"	Writer/Acoustic; Uncredited
2010	90210	"Siempre Tu"	Writer; Uncredited
2010	Pretty Little Liars	"Siempre Tu"	Uncredited
2012	Rock of Ages	Various	
2018	Luis Miguel	Various	Luis Miguel: La Serie — Soundtrack

== Awards and nominations ==
Year	Award	Category	Work	Result
2012	ALMA Awards	Favorite Movie Actor	Rock of Ages	Won
2012	CinemaCon	Rising Star	Rock of Ages	Won
2012	Teen Choice Awards	Chemistry	Rock of Ages	Nominated
2018	5th Fénix Awards	Best Acting Ensemble in Series	Luis Miguel: The Series	Nominated
2019	Platino Awards	Best Actor in a Miniseries or TV series	Luis Miguel: The Series	Nominated
2020	Seguso	Best Young Actor	New Order	Won
