= Fairfax (TV series) =

American adult animated television series

- Genre: Animated sitcom; Comedy
- Created by: Matt Hausfater; Aaron Buchsbaum; Teddy Riley
- Directed by: Angelo Hatgistavrou
- Voices of: Skyler Gisondo; Kiersey Clemons; Peter S. Kim; Jaboukie Young-White
- Composer: Joseph Shirley
- Country of origin: United States
- Original language: English
- No. of seasons: 2
- No. of episodes: 16

Production
- Executive producers: Matt Hausfater; Aaron Buchsbaum; Teddy Riley; Peter A. Knight; Jon Zimelis; Jason U. Nadler; Chris Prynoski; Shannon Prynoski; Ben Kalina; Antonio Canobbio
- Producer: Robbee Jones
- Editor: Megan Love
- Running time: 30 minutes
- Production companies: The Adorable Trio; Chicky Chopson Televisuals; Serious Business; Titmouse, Inc.; Amazon Studios

Original release
- Network: Amazon Prime Video
- Release: October 29, 2021 – June 10, 2022

Fairfax is an American adult animated comedy television series created by Matt Hausfater, Aaron Buchsbaum, and Teddy Riley. The series is voiced by Skyler Gisondo, Kiersey Clemons, Peter S. Kim, and Jaboukie Young-White. It was released on Amazon Prime Video on October 29, 2021.

== Premise ==
Four middle school best friends attempt to become popular on Fairfax Avenue – the heart of Los Angeles' hypebeast culture.

== Cast and characters ==
=== Main ===
- Skyler Gisondo as Dale
- Kiersey Clemons as Derica
- Peter S. Kim as Benny
- Jaboukie Young-White as Truman

=== Guest ===
- Pamela Adlon as Phyllis
- Jeff Bottoms as The Plug
- Yvette Nicole Brown as Trini
- Rob Delaney as Grant
- Zoey Deutch as Lily
- Colton Dunn as Principal Weston
- John Leguizamo as Glenn the pigeon
- Camila Mendes as Melody
- Larry Owens as Jules
- Linda Park as Joy
- Billy Porter as Hiroki Hassan
- Ben Schwartz as Cody
- Tim Simons as Brian
- J. B. Smoove as Quattro the pigeon
- SungWon Cho as Jay
- Dr. Phil as himself

== Episodes ==
=== Series overview ===
Season	Episodes	Originally released
1	8	October 29, 2021
2	8	June 10, 2022

=== Season 1 (2021) ===
No. overall	No. in season	Title	Directed by	Written by	Original release date
1	1	"Pilot"	Matt Taylor	Teddy Riley, Aaron Buchsbaum, Matthew Hausfater	October 29, 2021
2	2	"Big Peens"	Douglas Einar Olsen	Teddy Riley, Aaron Buchsbaum, Matthew Hausfater	October 29, 2021
3	3	"Fairfolks"	Matt Taylor	Laura Pollak	October 29, 2021
4	4	"Dale Hates His Dad"	Erica Hayes	Evan Waite	October 29, 2021
5	5	"Chernobylfest"	Douglas Einar Olsen	Shana Gohd	October 29, 2021
6	6	"Smells Like E-Spirit"	Erica Hayes	Evan Waite	October 29, 2021
7	7	"Secure the Bag"	Matt Taylor, Patrick Kochakji	Connie Shin	October 29, 2021
8	8	"Belly of the Hypebeast"	Doug Einar Olsen	Aaron Buchsbaum, Teddy Riley, Matthew Hausfater	October 29, 2021

=== Season 2 (2022) ===
No. overall	No. in season	Title	Directed by	Written by	Original release date
9	1	"Fairfax at Night"	Erica Hayes	Aaron Buchsbaum, Teddy Riley, Matthew Hausfater	June 10, 2022
10	2	"So You Think You Can Grieve?"	Patrick Kochakji	Shaun Diston	June 10, 2022
11	3	"The Circle of Hype"	Douglas Einar Olsen	Laura Pollak	June 10, 2022
12	4	"Career Day"	Erica Hayes, Becks Wallace	Marlena Rodriguez	June 10, 2022
13	5	"This Binch is on Fire"	Patrick Kochakji	Michael Liebenson	June 10, 2022
14	6	"Clout 9"	Douglas Einar Olsen	Jen Kim	June 10, 2022
15	7	"Big Little Al's"	Erica Hayes, Becks Wallace	Ariel Ladensohn	June 10, 2022
16	8	"Fashion War"	Patrick Kochakji	Aaron Buchsbaum, Matthew Hausfater, Teddy Riley	June 10, 2022

== Production ==
The project was first announced to be in development at Amazon Studios on December 19, 2019, with Matt Hausfater attached as co-creator. On January 29, 2020, Amazon Prime Video gave the project a 2-season order consisting of 8 half-hour episodes per season, with Aaron Buchsbaum and Teddy Riley joining as co-creators and executive producing the project alongside Hausfater. It was also announced that Chris Prynoski, Shannon Prynoski, and Ben Kalina of Titmouse, Inc. were set to also executive produce the series alongside Serious Business. The characters for the series were designed by graphic designer Somehoodlum.

On September 29, 2021, it was announced that Skyler Gisondo, Kiersey Clemons, Peter S. Kim, and Jaboukie Young-White would make up the main voice cast with Pamela Adlon, Yvette Nicole Brown, Rob Delaney, Zoey Deutch, John Leguizamo, Camila Mendes, Billy Porter, and Ben Schwartz among the guest stars.

== Release ==
All eight episodes of the first season premiered on Amazon Prime Video on October 29, 2021. Season 2 was released on June 10, 2022.

== Reception ==
The first season holds an 83% approval rating on review aggregator Rotten Tomatoes, based on 12 critic reviews. Daniel Fienberg of The Hollywood Reporter called the series "...a fittingly ephemeral thing, more amusingly silly than deeply funny. It's visually energetic, humorously frantic and populated by an exceptional voice cast. It's much more invested in endless name-dropping than in being consistently substantive, but it does a good job of simultaneously respecting and mocking the world it's depicting." In a negative review, Megan Kirby of The A.V. Club wrote, "Fairfax presents itself as a show for the terminally online. But somehow, it only scratches the surface of the internet culture that makes up its whole premise."
