= Margo's Got Money Troubles =

2026 American comedy-drama television series

- Genre: Comedy-drama
- Created by: David E. Kelley
- Based on: Margo's Got Money Troubles by Rufi Thorpe
- Showrunner: David E. Kelley
- Starring: Elle Fanning; Nick Offerman; Greg Kinnear; Thaddea Graham; Michael Angarano; Michelle Pfeiffer; Nicole Kidman
- Music by: Nathan Micay
- Opening theme: "Blow My Mind" by Robyn
- Country of origin: United States
- Original language: English
- No. of seasons: 1
- No. of episodes: 8

Production
- Executive producers: Sam French; Phoebe Zimmer; Alli Reich; Boo Killebrew; Rufi Thorpe; Brittany Kahan Ward; Matthew Tinker; Nicole Kidman; Per Saari; Elle Fanning; Dakota Fanning; Michelle Pfeiffer; Dearbhla Walsh; Eva Anderson; David E. Kelley; Checka Propper
- Producer: Caroline James
- Cinematography: Carl Herse; Tari Segal
- Editors: Ben Lester; Libby Cuenin
- Running time: 35–44 minutes
- Production companies: David E. Kelley Productions; Blossom Films; Lewellen Pictures; A24

Original release
- Network: Apple TV
- Release: April 15, 2026 – present

Margo's Got Money Troubles is an American comedy-drama television series created by David E. Kelley, based on the 2024 novel by Rufi Thorpe. It stars Elle Fanning, Nick Offerman, Greg Kinnear, Thaddea Graham, Michael Angarano, Michelle Pfeiffer, and Nicole Kidman. The series premiered on Apple TV on April 15, 2026. It received positive reviews from critics and was renewed for a second season. For its first season, it won three awards at the 78th Primetime Emmy Awards, while also receiving a nomination for Outstanding Comedy Series, as well as acting nominations for Fanning, Pfeiffer, and Offerman.

== Premise ==
Margo's Got Money Troubles centers on Margo Millet (Elle Fanning), the daughter of a Hooters waitress, Shyanne (Michelle Pfeiffer), and a former professional wrestler, Jinx (Nick Offerman). After becoming pregnant by her English professor (Michael Angarano), Margo turns to OnlyFans to financially support herself with the help of her estranged father, who tries to share wisdom gleaned from his wrestling days.

== Cast and characters ==
=== Main ===
- Elle Fanning as Margo Millet, a 20-year-old aspiring writer and freshman college dropout who turns to OnlyFans to support herself and her newborn after her professor gets her pregnant
- Nick Offerman as James "Jinx" Millet, Margo's estranged father, a former professional wrestler and recovering addict who moves in to assist with childcare and provides wrestling-inspired business advice
- Greg Kinnear as Kenneth "Kenny" Herns, an Episcopalian youth minister who is dating Margo's mother, Shyanne
- Thaddea Graham as Susie, Margo's roommate, an accomplished cosplayer and avid wrestling fan who helps Margo navigate the world of online content creation
- Michael Angarano as Mark Gable, Margo's community college professor who fathers her child and then vanishes from her life
- Michelle Pfeiffer as Shyanne, Margo's sassy, appearance-focused mother, a former Hooters waitress working in management at Bloomingdale's, who supports Margo despite disapproving of many of her decisions
- Nicole Kidman as Linda "Lace" Sawkins, a retired female wrestler-turned-lawyer who helps Margo and Jinx in legal disputes with Mark

=== Recurring ===
- Sasha Diamond as Becca, Margo's high school best friend, who attends New York University
- Marcia Gay Harden as Elizabeth Gable, Mark's protective mother
- Rico Nasty as KC, an OnlyFans creator under the username "WangMangler"
- Lindsey Normington as Rose, an OnlyFans creator under the username "SucculentRose"

=== Guest ===
- Laura San Giacomo as Tessa, Margo's boss at a restaurant
- Caitlin McGee as Sarah Gable, Mark's wife
- Annalise Basso as Kathryn, one of Margo's roommates
- Marisela Zumbado as Katie, another of Margo's roommates
- Kerri Kenney as Dana Lockhart, a job interviewer who rejects Margo
- Geoff Pierson as Lawrence J. Boch, Mark's family lawyer
- Rikishi as himself
- Chris Jericho as himself, Jinx's wrestling partner
- Jon Daly as Steve Thunder, a stage magician in Las Vegas
- Ericka Kreutz as Nadia
- Paul McCrane as Judge Andrew Spence

== Episodes ==
No.	Title	Directed by	Written by	Original release date
1	"The Hungry Ghost"	Dearbhla Walsh	David E. Kelley	April 15, 2026
Margo Millet is a 20-year-old aspiring writer and freshman at Fullerton College. When her married literature professor, Mark Gable, praises her latest assignment, Margo is flattered and begins an affair with him, despite warnings from her best friend, Becca, who attends college in New York City. Margo gets pregnant and informs Mark, who deduces that she intends to have an abortion. Having conceived Margo during a one-night stand, her mother, Shyanne, worries that the pregnancy will derail Margo's college career, but Margo decides to keep the baby. Some time later, after a trip to Bloomingdale's with Shyanne to buy a stroller, a heavily pregnant Margo spots Mark with his wife and children in the parking lot. Margo privately confronts Mark for ghosting her, and after he questions whether the baby is his, she says she wants nothing from him. Margo is then furious with Shyanne for not celebrating her pregnancy, to which Shyanne responds that life as Margo never got to know it is over. Margo gives birth to a baby boy, with Shyanne by her side.
2	"You Got This"	Dearbhla Walsh	David E. Kelley	April 15, 2026
After giving birth to her son, Bodhi, Margo is overwhelmed by motherhood, particularly struggling to get Bodhi to breastfeed. Shyanne reluctantly agrees to babysit Bodhi so that Margo can return to work. When Shyanne brings a crying Bodhi to the restaurant where Margo works, convinced that she is not cut out to be a grandmother, Margo's boss Tessa fires her. Later, Margo learns that two of her three roommates, annoyed by Bodhi's constant crying, are moving out the next week, leaving Margo with a larger portion of the rent. The next day, Margo stops by Mark's office at Fullerton with Bodhi in tow and demands $3,000 from him. That night, Margo joins Shyanne and her boyfriend, Kenny, an Episcopalian youth minister, for dinner at Applebee's and receives a phone call from Mark's mother, Elizabeth, who arranges a meeting about the $3,000 she demanded. After Margo gives Kenny her blessing, he proposes to Shyanne, who happily accepts. Later that night, Margo's father, Jinx, a former professional wrestler and recovering addict just released from rehab, arrives at her door.
3	"Jinxed"	Kate Herron	David E. Kelley	April 15, 2026
Margo introduces Jinx to Bodhi and lets him stay the night at her apartment. After an unsuccessful job interview, Margo meets with Elizabeth and the family lawyer, who suggests setting up a trust fund for Bodhi that should increase to $300,000 by the time he turns 18. Margo agrees to the arrangement, which also stipulates that she is barred from attending Fullerton and must sign a non-disclosure agreement. When Shyanne brings Margo her maid of honor dress, Jinx is shaken by the news of Shyanne's wedding. Margo agrees to let Jinx move in with her and her remaining roommate, Susie. Shyanne disapproves of this, accusing Jinx of nearly destroying Margo's life when he walked out, but Margo defends him. After Jinx mentions that a female professional wrestler made more money in a month on OnlyFans than in a year of wrestling, Margo creates an OnlyFans account under the username "HungryGhost", inspired by a poem Mark wrote for her. She charges subscribers $20 to compare their penises to Pokémon, and soon gains her first subscribers.
4	"Buddies"	Kate Herron	Eva Anderson	April 22, 2026
Margo's OnlyFans account reaches nearly 200 subscribers. In order to grow her following, Margo messages KC and Rose, a pair of popular OnlyFans creators based nearby in Orange County, proposing a collaboration. KC and Rose invite Margo to their apartment and agree to try collaborating with her. Inspired by a remark Shyanne made about how Margo trusts Jinx despite barely knowing him, he invites Margo to a wrestling fan convention so she can get a glimpse of his prior life. Shortly afterwards, Jinx accidentally walks in on Susie taking suggestive photos of Margo. When Margo tells Jinx about her OnlyFans account, he is disgusted. At the wrestling convention, Jinx apologizes to Margo for judging her and encounters an old friend, Lace, who challenges him to an impromptu match in the ring. When Lace kicks Jinx to the ground, he is suddenly unable to move. When Jinx asks about Bodhi's father, Margo reveals it is Mark. Jinx goes to Mark's office at Fullerton and breaks his hand with a handshake.
5	"Flamingos"	Dearbhla Walsh	Boo Killebrew	April 29, 2026
Margo and Shyanne go to Las Vegas for Shyanne's wedding to Kenny. Jinx tags along to look after Bodhi. When Kenny realizes he has forgotten his tie for the wedding ceremony, Margo offers to help him pick a new one, and they begin to bond. That night, while Kenny is asleep, Shyanne takes Margo and Jinx to a local bar for a proper bachelorette party. Shyanne reminisces about the time she and Jinx had sex in the bathroom of that bar before remarking that he ruined his chance to be with her. After Jinx leaves, Margo and Shyanne have a wild night out in the city. As they share a tender moment, Margo tells Shyanne about her OnlyFans account, and Shyanne lashes out in anger. The next day, Shyanne and Kenny marry in front of an Elvis impersonator and Margo toasts the newlyweds. Outside the chapel, Jinx cries after observing the ceremony. Margo and Jinx decide to leave Las Vegas together.
6	"Grudge Match"	Alice Seabright	Keiko Green	May 6, 2026
With assistance from Jinx and Susie, Margo collaborates with KC and Rose on a series of videos to promote her HungryGhost persona, a blue-skinned alien, which are posted on HungryGhost's TikTok and Instagram accounts. Mark files a restraining order against Jinx, who pays a visit to Lace, now a lawyer. Lace advises Jinx to stay away from Mark and implies that she might still be interested in Jinx. Margo's videos as HungryGhost go viral, resulting in a surge in OnlyFans subscribers. Margo and the visiting Becca attend a New Year's Eve party. Some partygoers recognize Margo as HungryGhost, and she receives harassing messages. Having learned of Margo's OnlyFans, Becca questions her life choices, and the two part ways after a heated argument. The next morning, Margo and Jinx visit Shyanne after Margo's OnlyFans is exposed. Margo comes clean to Kenny, who is sympathetic and offers his support. Margo is notified that Mark has filed for full custody of Bodhi on the grounds that she is an unfit mother.
7	"Lariat Takedown"	Alice Seabright	Eva Anderson & David E. Kelley	May 13, 2026
During a mediation session with Lace acting as Margo's attorney, Mark expresses concerns about how Margo's job as a sex worker will affect her life, including Bodhi's upbringing. In the reception area, Elizabeth enrages Shyanne by claiming Margo targeted Mark in order to exploit him. Shyanne punches Elizabeth, breaking her jaw. Jinx is hospitalized after Margo and Susie find him passed out in the bathtub with a heroin needle in his arm. At the hospital, Lace instructs Margo to throw Jinx out of her apartment, as Mark has requested a home inspection and a psychiatric evaluation. Jinx checks into a methadone clinic and Shyanne allows him to stay at her former apartment. Before Jinx can move out of Margo's apartment, a child protective services (CPS) agent and a public health nurse pay a surprise visit to inspect the apartment, having received an anonymous complaint. Due to Jinx's history of drug abuse, the agent requires that Margo, Jinx, and Susie all take drug tests.
8	"Lock and Load"	Dearbhla Walsh	Eva Anderson & David E. Kelley	May 20, 2026
Jinx's drug test is positive. Lace instructs Margo to prepare for her psychiatric evaluation and tells Shyanne to apologize to Elizabeth. Elizabeth, whose jaw is wired shut, accepts Shyanne's apology, then remarks how disappointed Shyanne must be in Margo. During a second mediation session, Margo is declared psychologically fit to retain full custody of Bodhi, but Mark demands joint custody and requests that Margo's interactions with Bodhi be supervised for the first two years. Enraged, Margo lunges at Mark, forcing the case into Superior Court. At the court hearing, Judge Andrew Spence evaluates Margo's family by having each member hold Bodhi. When Mark holds Bodhi for the first time, the baby immediately cries. Margo is granted primary custody while Mark is allowed to have Bodhi two weekends a month. Margo makes peace with Mark, who reveals he never reported her to CPS. Kenny admits to calling CPS because he was worried about Bodhi after Jinx's relapse, leaving Shyanne hurt. Margo continues to expand her career as an OnlyFans creator.

== Production ==
=== Development ===
It was announced in October 2023 that Elle Fanning and Nicole Kidman would star in and executive produce the series, of which David E. Kelley would serve as showrunner. In February 2024, Apple TV+ landed the rights to the series and gave it a straight-to-series order. In April 2025, Dearbhla Walsh, Kate Herron, and Alice Seabright were revealed as the series' directors. Walsh directed four of the eight episodes, including the pilot, and Herron and Seabright directed two episodes each. Walsh also served as executive producer of the series. In May 2026, Apple TV renewed the series for a second season.

=== Casting ===
In September 2024, Michelle Pfeiffer joined the cast and became an executive producer. It is the first time she has collaborated with Kelley, her husband. Nick Offerman and Thaddea Graham were added to the cast in the following months. In February 2025, Marcia Gay Harden and Michael Angarano were cast in guest roles. In March 2025, Greg Kinnear, Lindsey Normington, Rico Nasty, and Michael Workéyè joined the cast.

=== Filming ===
In November 2024, principal photography was set to begin in January 2025 in New York. It began instead in Los Angeles in February, and was expected to conclude in May. On June 24, 2025, Pfeiffer announced that filming had wrapped.

== Release ==
Margo's Got Money Troubles premiered at the 2026 SXSW Film & TV Festival on March 12, 2026, in Austin, Texas. It released its first three episodes on April 15, 2026, with new episodes to drop weekly thereafter through May 20.

== Reception ==
=== Critical response ===
Metacritic review
breakdown (unweighted)

Positive
25 (86%)
Mixed
4 (14%)
Negative
0 (0%)

On the review aggregator website Rotten Tomatoes, the series holds an approval rating of 96%, based on 74 critic reviews, with an average rating of 8/10. The website's critics consensus reads: "Rich in character and dramatic antics, Margo's Got Money Troubles succeeds because of its attention to emotional detail, authentic performances, and brilliant storytelling." Metacritic, which uses a weighted average, assigned a score of 79 out of 100, based on 29 critics, indicating "generally favorable" reviews.

=== Awards and nominations ===
Year	Award	Date of ceremony	Category	Recipient(s)	Result	Ref.
2026	Astra TV Awards	August 15, 2026	Best Comedy Series	Margo's Got Money Troubles	Nominated	
2026	Astra TV Awards	August 15, 2026	Best Actress in a Comedy Series	Elle Fanning	Nominated	
2026	Astra TV Awards	August 15, 2026	Best Supporting Actor in a Comedy Series	Nick Offerman	Nominated	
2026	Astra TV Awards	August 15, 2026	Best Supporting Actress in a Comedy Series	Michelle Pfeiffer	Nominated	
2026	Astra TV Awards	August 15, 2026	Best Streaming Comedy Ensemble	Margo's Got Money Troubles	Nominated	
2026	Astra TV Awards	August 15, 2026	Best Book to Screen Series	Margo's Got Money Troubles	Nominated	
2026	Celebration of LGBTQ+ Cinema & Television	May 30, 2026	Director Award	Dearbhla Walsh	Honored	
2026	Dorian TV Awards	August 15, 2026	Best TV Performance – Comedy	Elle Fanning	Nominated	
2026	Dorian TV Awards	August 15, 2026	Best Supporting TV Performance – Comedy	Michelle Pfeiffer	Nominated	
2026	Gotham TV Awards	June 1, 2026	Outstanding Lead Performance in a Comedy Series	Elle Fanning	Nominated	
2026	Gotham TV Awards	June 1, 2026	Outstanding Supporting Performance in a Comedy Series	Michelle Pfeiffer	Nominated	
2026	Primetime Emmy Awards	September 14, 2026	Outstanding Comedy Series	Sam French, Phoebe Zimmer, Alli Reich, Boo Killebrew, Rufi Thorpe, Brittany Kahan-Ward, Matthew Tinker, Nicole Kidman, Per Saari, Elle Fanning, Dakota Fanning, Michelle Pfeiffer, Dearbhla Walsh, Eva Anderson, David E. Kelley, Briar McQuilkin, Jes Anderson, and Caroline James	Nominated	
2026	Primetime Emmy Awards	September 14, 2026	Outstanding Lead Actress in a Comedy Series	Elle Fanning	Nominated	
2026	Primetime Emmy Awards	September 14, 2026	Outstanding Supporting Actor in a Comedy Series	Nick Offerman	Nominated	
2026	Primetime Emmy Awards	September 14, 2026	Outstanding Supporting Actress in a Comedy Series	Michelle Pfeiffer	Nominated	
2026	Primetime Creative Arts Emmy Awards	September 5–6, 2026	Outstanding Cinematography for a Series (One Hour)	Tari Segal (for "Flamingos")	Nominated	
2026	Primetime Creative Arts Emmy Awards	September 5–6, 2026	Outstanding Contemporary Costumes for a Series	Mirren Gordon-Crozier, Tracy Jarvis, Brooke Thatawat, Mallory Bradley, Key Costumer, and Tara White (for "Grudge Match")	Won	
2026	Primetime Creative Arts Emmy Awards	September 5–6, 2026	Outstanding Contemporary Hairstyling	Jaime Leigh McIntosh, Ahou Mofid, Celeste Gonzalez, Kim Santantonio, and R'riyana Kilne (for "Buddies")	Won	
2026	Primetime Creative Arts Emmy Awards	September 5–6, 2026	Outstanding Contemporary Makeup (Non-Prosthetic)	Erin Ayanian Monroe, Michele Teleis, Bonni Flowers, Valli O'Reilly, and Angela Levin (for "Grudge Match")	Won	
2026	Set Decorators Society of America TV Awards	August 9, 2026	Best Achievement in Décor/Design of a One Hour Contemporary Series	Linette McCown and Richard Bloom	Nominated	
2026	TCA Awards	August 20, 2026	Outstanding Achievement in Comedy	Margo's Got Money Troubles	Nominated	
2026	TCA Awards	August 20, 2026	Individual Achievement in Comedy	Elle Fanning	Nominated	
2026	TCA Awards	August 20, 2026	Outstanding New Program	Margo's Got Money Troubles	Nominated	

== Impact ==
UCLA professor Daniel T. Blumstein cited Margo's Got Money Troubles as inspiration for starting an "OnlyMarms" account on OnlyFans, to raise money for marmot research.
