= Matchbox: The Movie =

2026 film by Sam Hargrave

- Release poster
- Directed by: Sam Hargrave
- Written by: David Coggeshall
- Based on: Matchbox by Mattel
- Produced by: David Ellison; Dana Goldberg; Don Granger; Robbie Brenner
- Starring: John Cena; Jessica Biel; Sam Richardson; Arturo Castro; Teyonah Parris; Corey Stoll; Bill Camp; Golshifteh Farahani; Danai Gurira
- Cinematography: Pedro Luque
- Edited by: Dirk Westervelt
- Music by: Alex Belcher
- Production companies: Apple Studios; Skydance Media; Mattel Studios
- Distributed by: Apple TV
- Release dates: October 5, 2026 (AMC Lincoln Square); October 9, 2026 (Apple TV)
- Running time: 126 minutes
- Country: United States
- Language: English

Matchbox: The Movie is a 2026 American action comedy film directed by Sam Hargrave and written by David Coggeshall, based on the toy brand Matchbox by Mattel. It stars John Cena, Jessica Biel, Sam Richardson, Arturo Castro, Teyonah Parris, Corey Stoll, Bill Camp, Golshifteh Farahani, and Danai Gurira. In the film, CIA spy Sean Walker reunites with childhood friends only to be drugged and kidnapped by a group looking for a nuclear warhead. The CIA believes Walker and his friends stole the nuclear weapon, so the group decides to re-steal the bomb and clear their names.

Matchbox: The Movie was released in the United States on Apple TV on October 9, 2026. It received negative reviews from critics.

== Plot ==
In the late 1990s, middle schoolers Sean, Aimee, Crosby, Ted and Charmaine form a tight-knit group of friends known as the "Matchbox Gang" in Cartersville, Ohio, bonded by their shared childhood interest in Matchbox cars. Although Sean harbors a crush on Aimee, the group eventually drifts into adulthood along separate paths. Years later, Aimee works as a motor-racing paramedic, Crosby is a construction foreman married to Charmaine, now a newscopter pilot, and Ted works as a high school science teacher. Unlike his friends who lead quiet lives in their hometown, Sean serves as a globe-trotting CIA operative.

One day, Smalley, a mechanic at the auto repair shop and Aimee’s uncle, passes away, prompting Sean to return to his hometown after 28 years and reunite with Aimee, Crosby, Ted, and Charmaine. Unexpectedly, the incoming CIA Director, Mosier, kidnapped the five individuals, suspecting that Sean had stolen a nuclear warhead intended for a CIA ally. Sean rescued the group, fitted Mosier and the others with parachutes before pushing them out of the plane, and then landed the aircraft in Casablanca.

Subsequently, Sean discovers that his trusted CIA contact, Helen, along with several other associates, have gone rogue. They have stolen the nuclear warhead and intend to detonate it at a peace summit in Budapest, aiming to incite the United States to engage in further foreign conflicts. Aimee, Crosby, Ted, and Charmaine have been framed by the CIA and are now wanted fugitives; Sean leads them as they evade the forces sent by Helen. Determined to recover the nuclear warhead and clear his friends' names, Sean—with the help of his Russian ally, Grigor, seeks out his Romanian ally, Robbie, who is currently in possession of the warhead. Helen’s associates, including Falko, showed up and took away the nuclear warhead along with Sean.

Aimee, Crosby, Ted, and Charmaine decide to rescue Sean and recover the nuclear warhead; Robbie provides them with vehicles and other equipment, enabling them to catch up with Helen’s convoy. In the end, with the help of his friends, Sean killed Falko and the others, but Helen managed to escape with the nuclear warhead.

Helen left the truck carrying the nuclear warhead in Budapest, then attempted to depart by helicopter. Matchbox Gang discovered the nuclear warhead, but it is set to detonate once it moves beyond a certain distance from Helen. Sean caught up with Helen and managed to retrieve the detonator, while Helen died in a helicopter crash. Afterward, Mosier arrived to retrieve the nuclear warhead, thanked the Matchbox Gang for their contribution, cleared Aimee, Crosby, Ted, and Charmaine of all charges, and provided them with compensation. Sean said goodbye to his friends and left with Mosier.

Aimee, Crosby, Ted, and Charmaine returned to Ohio. Crosby and Charmaine decided to move to Seattle to pursue Charmaine’s dream. Sean and Aimee reunite and resolve their lingering issues, allowing their long-stalled romance to finally blossom.

== Cast ==
- John Cena as Sean Walker
  - Graham Harvey as young Sean Walker
- Jessica Biel as Aimee
  - Reagan Marum as young Aimee
- Sam Richardson as Crosby
  - Aiden Stoxx as young Crosby
- Arturo Castro as Ted
  - Max Fox as young Ted
- Teyonah Parris as Charmaine
  - Braxton Paul as young Charmaine
- Corey Stoll as Mosier
- Bill Camp as Smalley
- Golshifteh Farahani as Robbie
- Danai Gurira as Helen
- Daniel Bernhardt as Falko
- Randeep Hooda as Mustafa
- Kristoffer Hivju as Grigor
- Tornike Gogrichiani as Eastbrook
- Sam Hargrave as Crew Chief Grizz

== Production ==
In May 2024, Skydance Media and Mattel Films were developing a live-action film based on the toy brand Matchbox. Sam Hargrave had been hired to direct the film, and David Coggeshall and Jonathan Tropper were writing the screenplay. In September, John Cena joined the cast in the lead role. In November, Jessica Biel joined the cast in an undisclosed role. In December, Sam Richardson, Arturo Castro, and Teyonah Parris joined the cast in undisclosed roles. Randeep Hooda, Danai Gurira, Corey Stoll, Bill Camp, and Golshifteh Farahani would later be added to the cast.

Filming began in Budapest in January 2025, with additional filming taking place in Casablanca in March, as evidenced by social media posts showing lead actor John Cena filming action car scenes on location. Scenes were also filmed in Erfoud, Merzouga, and New Milford Connecticut. Production was set in Slovakia and Los Angeles. Principal photography ended on April 7, 2025.

== Release ==
Matchbox: The Movie had its world premiere at the AMC Lincoln Square Theater in New York on October 5, 2026, and was released to Apple TV on October 9.

== Reception ==
=== Viewership ===
Matchbox: The Movie ranked first on Apple TV viewing chart in the United States within the first 24 hours of its release, surpassing Mayday and F1, and is currently in the top 10 in 23 countries.

=== Critical response ===
On the review aggregator website Rotten Tomatoes, 30% of 43 critics' reviews are positive, with an average rating of 4/10. Metacritic, which uses a weighted average, assigned the film a score of 34 out of 100, based on 12 critics, indicating "generally unfavorable" reviews.

Nell Minow, writing for RogerEbert.com, gave the film three out of four stars, writing, "Thanks to a powerhouse cast, a director who did stunts in Avengers movies, excellent cinematography from Pedro Luque, and editing by Dirk Westervelt, it's quite fun." Benjamin Lee of The Guardian gave Matchbox: the Movie one star out of five, calling it "an empty-headed, synthetically made action film, cobbled together as if by machinery only, so lacking in personality or even viguor that it's impossible to believe that anyone involved was there for anything but an undeserved paycheck."
