= Overdressed (Cat Cohen album) =

Studio album by Cat Cohen
- Released: November 15, 2024
- Length: 31:03
- Label: Elektra
- Producer: Couros

Singles from Overdressed
- 1. "Can U Send Me That??" Released: October 4, 2024; 2. "Blame It On The Moon" Released: October 16, 2024; 3. "Plus One" Released: November 15, 2024

Overdressed is a studio album by American comedian and recording artist Cat Cohen, released via the label Elektra Records on November 15, 2024. The comedic album has ten tracks, with multiple songs about the holiday season.

== Composition ==
Overdressed was recorded in nine days in London, England with songwriter and producer Couros. The lead single, "Can U Send Me That" was released in early October 2024, with the second single "Blame It On The Moon" released shortly after. The album contains a blend of Pop music and Cohen’s comedy, addressing astrology, party photos, and begging for attention. Cohen told Billboard that the album consists partially of old songs that have already been in her previous comedy specials.

== Track listing ==
Track listing and credits adapted from Apple Music and Spotify.

Overdressed
No.	Title	Writer(s)	Producer(s)	Length
1.	"Events!"	Cat Cohen; Henry Koperski	Couros	2:52
2.	"Can U Send Me That??"	Cohen; Belot; Pura Bliss; Couros	Couros	3:10
3.	"I Like Men"	Cohen; Belot; Pura Bliss; David Dabbon	Couros	4:11
4.	"Plus One"	Cohen; Koperski	Couros	2:35
5.	"Blame It On The Moon"	Cohen; Dabbon	Couros	3:35
6.	"Time of Year"	Cohen; Koperski	Couros	2:24
7.	"I Just Bought A Journal"	Cohen; Belot; Pura Bliss; Couros	Couros	3:44
8.	"Going Out Tonight"	Cohen; Couros	Couros	3:01
9.	"Only One"	Cohen	Couros	2:12
10.	"Good Not Bad"	Cohen	Couros	3:14
Total length:				31:03

== Personnel ==
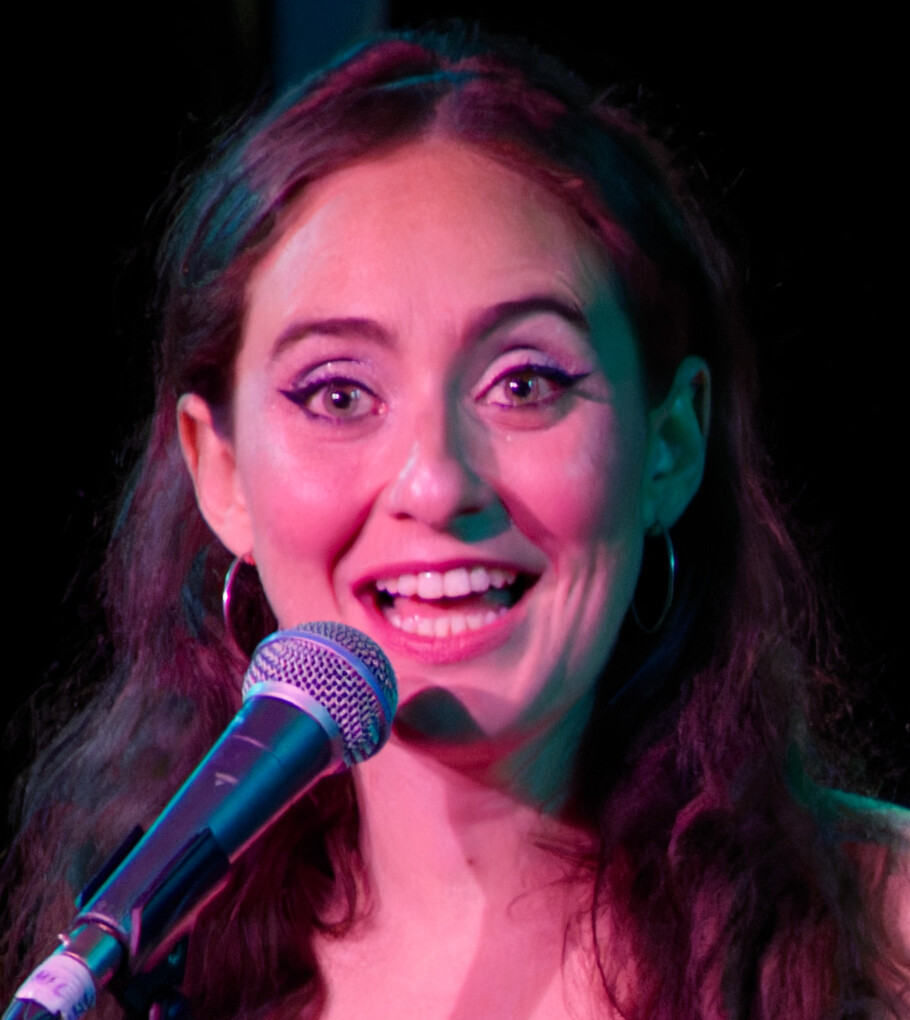
Cat Cohen at the 2024 Edinburgh Festival Fringe.

Personnel adapted from Apple Music and Spotify.

- Cat Cohen – primary artist, composer
- Couros – composer, producer
- Henry Koperski – composer
- David Dabbon – composer
- Belot – composer
- Pura Bliss – composer
