= Alternatino with Arturo Castro =

- Genre: Sketch comedy
- Created by: Arturo Castro
- Directed by: Nick Jasenovec
- Presented by: Arturo Castro
- Country of origin: United States
- Original language: English
- No. of seasons: 1
- No. of episodes: 10

Production
- Executive producers: Arturo Castro; Jay Martel; Nick Jasenovec; Sam Saife; David Martin; Jon Thoday; Richard Allen-Turner
- Running time: 30 minutes
- Production companies: Arturo Pictures; JS Martel Productions; Avalon Television

Original release
- Network: Comedy Central
- Release: June 18 – August 20, 2019

Alternatino with Arturo Castro is an American sketch comedy television series, created by and starring Arturo Castro, which premiered on June 18, 2019 on Comedy Central. The series is executive produced by Castro, Jay Martel, Nick Jasenovec, Sam Saife, David Martin, Jon Thoday, and Richard Allen-Turner. Jasenovec directed the whole first season as well.

The series was renewed for a second season and would have moved to Quibi, but as the service shut down in December 2020, this never materialized.

== Premise ==
Alternatino with Arturo Castro is described as "a sketch show based on Arturo's experiences as a Latino millennial in the United States."

== Production ==
=== Development ===
On April 17, 2018, it was announced that Comedy Central had given the production a series order. The series was created by and set to star Arturo Castro who will also executive produce alongside Nick Jasenovec, Sam Saife, David Martin, Jon Thoday, and Richard Allen-Turner. Jasenovec is also expected to act as director for the series. Production companies involved with the series include Avalon Television.

On June 26, 2018, it was reported that Jay Martel had been hired as a showrunner and executive producer for the series.

On April 18, 2019, it was announced that the series would premiere on June 18, 2019.

=== Filming ===
Principal photography for the series had reportedly commenced by December 11, 2018, in New York City, New York.

== Episodes ==
No.	Title	Directed by	Written by	Original release date	U.S. viewers (millions)
1	"The Date"	Nicholas Jasenovec	Jeremy Beiler, Joanna Bradley, Arturo Castro, Rebecca Drysdale, Brenda Fitzgibbons, Chris Garcia, & Nicholas Jasenovec	June 10, 2019 (online); June 18, 2019 (Comedy Central)	0.287
2	"The Pivot"	Nicholas Jasenovec	Zachary Bornstein, Jen Burton, Arturo Castro, Brendan Fitzgibbons, Mike Hanford, Hannah Levy, Jay Martel, Adriana Robles, Sergio Serna, David Sidorov, & David St. Germain	June 25, 2019	0.218
3	"The Aunts"	Nicholas Jasenovec	Zachary Bornstein, Jen Burton, Arturo Castro, Brendan Fitzgibbons, Mike Hanford, Hannah Levy, Jay Martel, Adriana Robles, Sergio Serna, David Sidorov, & David St. Germain	July 2, 2019	0.226
4	"The Girlfriend"	Nicholas Jasenovec	Zachary Bornstein, Jen Burton, Arturo Castro, Brendan Fitzgibbons, Mike Hanford, Hannah Levy, Jay Martel, Adriana Robles, Sergio Serna, David Sidorov, & David St. Germain	July 9, 2019	0.221
5	"La Pulga"	Nicholas Jasenovec	Zachary Bornstein, Jen Burton, Arturo Castro, Brendan Fitzgibbons, Mike Hanford, Hannah Levy, Jay Martel, Adriana Robles, Sergio Serna, David Sidorov, & David St. Germain	July 16, 2019	0.198
6	"The Teammate"	Nicholas Jasenovec	Zachary Bornstein, Jen Burton, Arturo Castro, Brendan Fitzgibbons, Mike Hanford, Hannah Levy, Jay Martel, Adriana Robles, Sergio Serna, David Sidorov, & David St. Germain	July 23, 2019	0.170
7	"The Gift"	Nicholas Jasenovec	Zachary Bornstein, Jen Burton, Arturo Castro, Brendan Fitzgibbons, Mike Hanford, Hannah Levy, Jay Martel, Adriana Robles, Sergio Serna, David Sidorov, & David St. Germain	July 30, 2019	0.208
8	"The Neighbor"	Nicholas Jasenovec	Zachary Bornstein, Jen Burton, Arturo Castro, Brendan Fitzgibbons, Mike Hanford, Hannah Levy, Jay Martel, Adriana Robles, Sergio Serna, David Sidorov, & David St. Germain	August 6, 2019	0.209
9	"The Quince"	Nicholas Jasenovec	Zachary Bornstein, Jen Burton, Arturo Castro, Brendan Fitzgibbons, Mike Hanford, Hannah Levy, Jay Martel, Adriana Robles, Sergio Serna, David Sidorov, & David St. Germain	August 13, 2019	0.262
10	"The Dreamer"	Nicholas Jasenovec	Zachary Bornstein, Jen Burton, Arturo Castro, Brendan Fitzgibbons, Mike Hanford, Hannah Levy, Jay Martel, Adriana Robles, Sergio Serna, David Sidorov, & David St. Germain	August 20, 2019	0.204
