= Jaboukie Young-White =

American comedian, actor (born 1994)

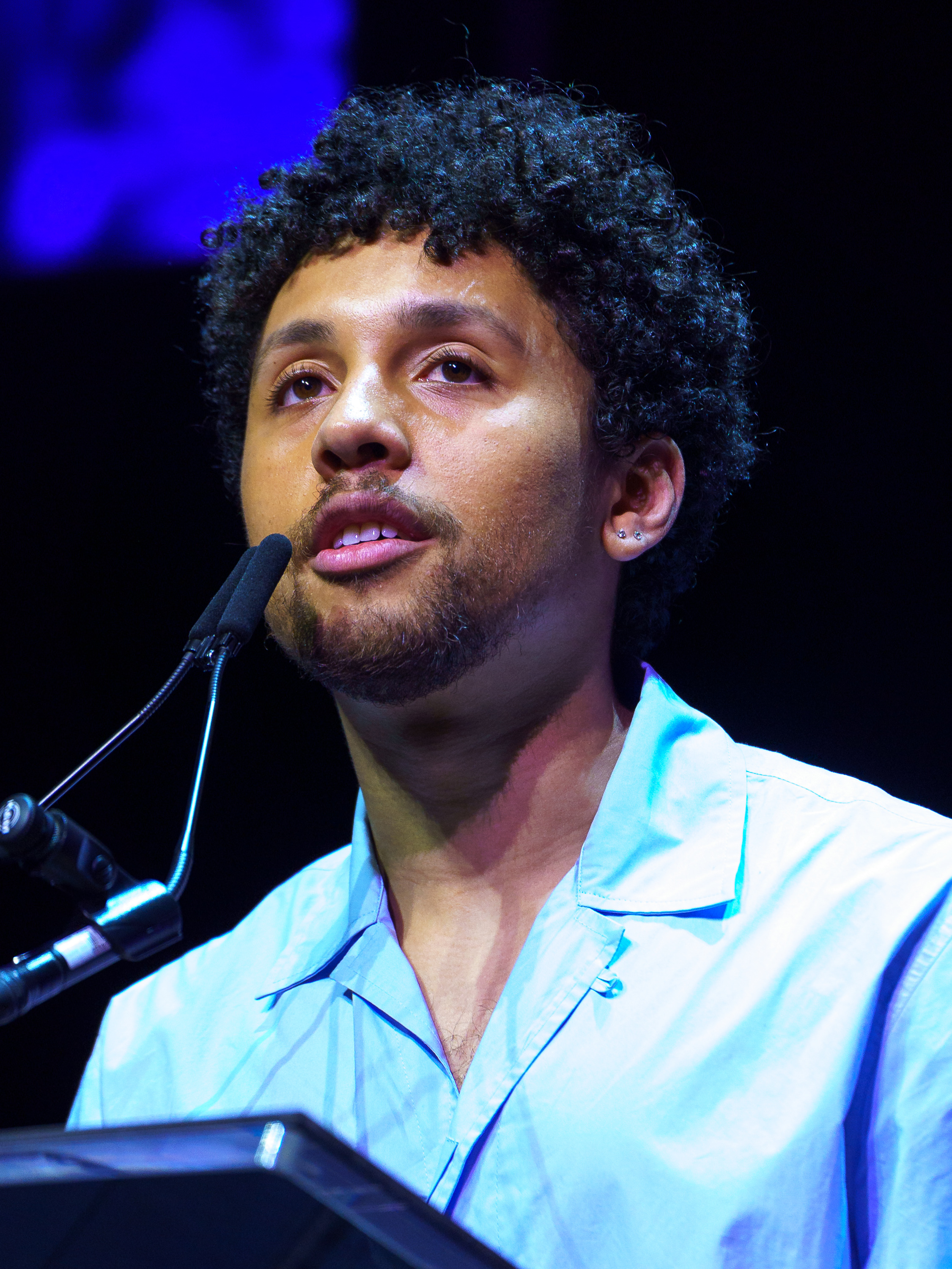
- Young-White at SXSW 2024
- Born: July 24, 1994 (age 32)
- Other name: Jaboukie
- Education: DePaul University (dropped out)
- Occupations: Comedian; writer; actor; musician
- Years active: 2013–present
- Known for: Only Murders in the Building; Strange World

Jaboukie Young-White (born July 24, 1994) is an American comedian, actor, writer and musician.

Young-White first gained recognition at a young age as a comedian, through which he made his television debut as a guest performer on two episodes of The Tonight Show Starring Jimmy Fallon (2017–2018). After his film debut in the black comedy Rough Night (2017), he co-wrote the Netflix mockumentary television series American Vandal (2018). His subsequent films included his first leading role in Dating and New York (2021), alongside supporting parts in Someone Great (2019) and C'mon C'mon (2021), and voice roles in Strange World (2022) and Ruby Gillman, Teenage Kraken (2023).

On television, Young-White played recurring parts on Awkwafina Is Nora from Queens (2020–2021) and Only Murders in the Building (2021–2022).

== Early life ==
Young-White was born to Jamaican immigrants and raised in Harvey, Illinois. He later attended Marian Catholic High School followed by DePaul University, where he became involved in improv comedy through the collegiate improvisation program "The Titanic Players". He ultimately left DePaul in 2016 during his senior year to pursue comedy full-time.

== Career ==
=== 2010s ===
Young-White performed stand-up for the first time at an open mic night when he was 19; he was hired for his first stand-up gig when he was 21. He continued to perform stand-up at several bars and clubs around Chicago and New York City, and was a finalist at the 2016 NYC Devil Cup Stand Up Festival.

Beginning in late 2016, several of his memes, tweets, and posts went viral. He subsequently gained prominence on social media, particularly on Twitter and Instagram, where he grew a large following.

Since 2017, he has performed stand-up twice on The Tonight Show Starring Jimmy Fallon.

As of 2018, he wrote for the Netflix television shows Big Mouth and American Vandal. In October of that year, he was hired as a correspondent on The Daily Show; he made his first appearance opposite Trevor Noah on October 11, 2018, and left in 2021.

In early 2019, Young-White was negotiating to be a lead in an untitled Bo Burnham and Amy York Rubin film alongside Danielle Macdonald.

On Martin Luther King Day (January 20, 2020), Young-White was temporarily banned from Twitter for posting a tweet posing as the FBI and claiming that they were responsible for the activist's assassination.

=== 2020s ===
On March 23, 2020, Twitter again suspended Young-White after he changed his display name and icon to that of the CNN Breaking News account, and tweeting: "BREAKING: Joe Biden is not DEAD. He just getting some dick. We've all been there cnn.com", thus making it appear as though CNN had posted the tweet. His account was restored less than a day later. However, he was subsequently stripped of his verified status.

In 2021, Young-White starred in the film Dating and New York. He also appeared opposite Joaquin Phoenix in the film C'mon C'mon and had a recurring role in the television series Only Murders in the Building. He voiced the lead role of Truman in the animated series Fairfax.

On June 10, 2021, it was announced that Young-White would be teaming up with Issa Rae and her production company Hoorae to develop the book The Gang's All Queer: The Lives of Gay Gang Members by Vanessa R. Panfil into a series for HBO. He will write and executive produce the project.

On July 20, 2021, it was announced that Young-White would be writing the script for an upcoming animated feature inspired by music of the late rapper Juice Wrld.

In 2022, Young-White had a recurring role in Rae's television show Rap Shit. He also voice acted in the Disney+ series Baymax! and voiced main character Ethan Clade in the Disney animated feature Strange World.

On September 30, 2022, Young-White released his debut single "BBC" via Interscope Records under the moniker "jaboukie." Two more singles, "ROCKWHYLER" and "not_me_tho," were subsequently released.

On August 1, 2023, jaboukie announced his debut album, All who can't hear must feel, which was released on August 25, 2023.

In July 2025, rapper and hip-hop artist Doechii revealed that she was working with Young-White for the script of her upcoming stage show School of Hip Hop that blended live choreography and evocative visuals with cultural commentary and satire. He will be appearing in Trash Mountain, a new movie written by fellow-comedian Caleb Hearon, according to an October 2025 announcement.

== Personal life ==
Young-White is gay, and did not come out to his parents until his 2017 debut on The Tonight Show. He is estranged from his "violently homophobic" father, but remains in contact with his mother who is accepting of his queerness. He lives in New York City.

== Awards and recognition ==
In 2017, he was featured on Rolling Stone's "25 Under 25: Meet the Young Musicians, Actors, Activists Changing the World" list. The following year, he was included in Vulture's "20 Comedians You Should and Will Know" list. In 2020, Young-White was placed on BET's "Future 40" list, which is a list of "40 of the most inspiring and innovative vanguards who are redefining what it means to be unapologetically young, gifted & black".

Young-White received the 2024 Comedy Connoisseur Award at Variety's annual Power of Comedy event for his broad body of work, including stand up performances and television appearances.

== Filmography ==
=== Film ===
Year	Title	Role	Notes
2015	Rooftops and Fire Escapes	Party Guy	Short
2017	Rough Night	Borat	
2018	Set It Up	Assistant Alex	
2018	Ralph Breaks the Internet	McNeely	Voice only
2019	Someone Great	Mikey	
2019	Vanilla	Garret	
2021	Dating and New York	Milo	
2021	C'mon C'mon	Fernando	
2022	Strange World	Ethan Clade	Voice only
2023	Ruby Gillman, Teenage Kraken	Connor	Voice only
2024	Golden	—N/a	Unreleased
2025	Companion	Teddy	
2025	The Threesome	Greg	
2026	The Love Hypothesis	Malcolm	
2026	Trash Mountain	TBA	Post-production

=== Television ===
Year	Title	Role	Notes
2017–18	The Tonight Show Starring Jimmy Fallon	Himself	Stand-up performer, 2 episodes
2018	Influencer	Duffer Stone	TV movie
2018	American Vandal	—N/a	Writer
2018–21	The Daily Show with Trevor Noah	Himself (correspondent)	57 episodes
2019	Crashing	Himself	Episode: "Jaboukie"
2019	Big Mouth	(voice)	Episode: "Duke"; also writer
2019	Total Forgiveness	Himself	Episode: "Stand-up/Diaries"
2019	The Rank Room	Himself	Episode: "What Is the Worst Tattoo to Get?"
2020	BoJack Horseman	(voice)	2 episodes
2020–21	Awkwafina Is Nora from Queens	Daniel	3 episodes
2021–22	Only Murders in the Building	Sam	5 episodes
2021–22	Fairfax	Truman, Reporter 2, Off-Brian Stan No. 2, Random Female Griever, Shu, EMTIT, Kellen, Extra 3, Sean (voice)	15 episodes
2022	Battle Kitty	Warriors, Squires, Cocky Warrior, Erik, Robber 2, Brad, Angelions, Pirates, Ghosts, Glitch Warrior (voice)	7 episodes
2022	Baymax!	Mbita (voice)	2 episodes
2022	The Great North	Holden (voice)	Episode: "Mall-mento Adventure"
2022–23	Rap Shit	Francois Boom	11 episodes
2023	Bob's Burgers	Blue Haired Teen (voice)	Episode: "These Boots Are Made for Stalking"
2023	Black Mirror	TV Eric	Episode: "Joan Is Awful"
2024	Fantasmas	Skyler	2 episodes
2025-2026	Abbott Elementary	Elijah	Recurring role; also executive story editor (S6)

=== Web ===
Year	Title	Role	Notes
2017	Black Tylenol	Martin	

== Discography ==
=== Studio albums ===
Title	EP details
All who can't hear must feel	Releases: August 25, 2023; Label: Interscope Records; Format: streaming

=== Singles ===
- "bbc" (2022)
- "ROCKWHYLER" (2022)
- "GONER" (2023)
- "not_me_tho" (2023)

=== Music videos ===
Title	Year	Director	Notes
"bbc"	2022	Jaboukie Young-White	
"ROCKWHYLER"	2022	Jaboukie Young-White	
"not_me_tho'	2023	Jaboukie Young-White	
