= Busboys (film) =

- Theatrical release poster
- Directed by: Jonah Feingold
- Screenplay by: David Spade; Theo Von
- Produced by: David Spade; Theo Von; Robert Ogden Barnum
- Starring: David Spade; Theo Von; Tim Dillon; Bobby Lee; Trevor Wallace; Jay Pharoah; Charlotte McKinney; Chris Elliott
- Cinematography: Jeff Leeds Cohn
- Edited by: Nathan Floody
- Music by: Chad Courneya; Hari Dafusia
- Production company: Night Media
- Distributed by: Busboys Holdings
- Release date: April 17, 2026
- Running time: 97 minutes
- Country: United States
- Language: English
- Box office: $2.6 million

Busboys is a 2026 American comedy film directed by Jonah Feingold and written and produced by David Spade and Theo Von, who also star in the film. The film follows two friends who become busboys in hopes that becoming waiters will help increase their social status and cash flow.

The film was released on April 17, 2026.

== Premise ==
A pair of idiot friends believe that if they become waiters, all of their problems will be solved. They are not entirely wrong, but they are not entirely right.

== Plot ==
Markie Montgomery (Spade) works for a service, "Last Lap," to give dying dogs an exciting drive before they are put to sleep. While on a drive with a dog, he accidentally hits a young high school student named Steefen Barn (Von, young version portrayed by Gavin Warren), who had just dropped out of school after being ridiculed for his father being in jail for murder. Steef is knocked unconscious and taken to the hospital. Waking at the hospital, Markie is waiting at Steef's bedside and is saddened to learn that Steef's mother and her girlfriend do not care for him and instead hoped that this incident would have killed him so she could claim the life insurance and use the money for a sex change operation. After his mother leaves, Steef tells Markie that he just quit high school and doesn't know what to do. Markie tells him he could help him and the film jumps forward 16 years to Markie and Steef working for a septic service company called "We Suck." Steef, who is saving money for his mother's Gender-affirming surgery, and Markie are paid very little, so the two are in dire financial straits.

Markie takes his girlfriend, Pam, to a restaurant and attempts to propose while several mishaps and a flirtatious waiter prevent him from being able to do so. Pam leaves with the waiter to go to the Cacti Lounge, where Markie had originally planned to take Pam. Disheartened by the failed proposal, Markie goes to work and confides in Steef, who assures Markie that there's still a chance even though Pam has made several social media posts that indicate she has left him for the waiter. They decide to go to her at the Cacti Lounge. Along the way, Markie loses his confidence and the two decide to go to Mexico to start a new life. They are stopped by the border wall and they decide to go back. On the way back they are beset by a hoard of Rabbits, which constantly dart in front of their car and get run over. While mourning the death of the hundreds of rabbits, the two pull into a restaurant where a "Busboys wanted" banner is hung. Markie believes that the two of them can start as busboys and graduate to waiters, at which point Pam will want him back.

After a miscommunication results in Markie having a strange sexual encounter with the manager of the restaurant, the two are hired on the condition that they do not speak of what happened. The two begin to work very hard to prove they are waiter material and grow relationships with the other bussers, including Murderball, a man who was wheelchair-bound after eating some bad chicken that gave him polio. After being passed over for promotion they turn to other ways to make money. There is a patron of the restaurant who sells drugs, so they meet with him and accept a roughly 5% cut of the profits in exchange for selling his Dexatrim. Upon attempting to sell to an undercover DEA agent (Pharoah), Markie and Steef are immediately caught by the law but sneak away when multiple agencies vie for jurisdiction of the situation. Markie and Steef are finally arrested after selling to a man who consumes an entire bag of the pills and rams his car into a parked vehicle.

While being interviewed at the police station, the detectives realize Markie and Steef have an association with the drug lord they are trying to arrest but that the two are morons slinging an herbal supplement that is legal over the counter. They decide to use Markie and Steef as informants and send them undercover into a high school for practice. Steef finds that he likes high school now. Now that the two are practiced informants, the detectives send Markie and Steef back into the restaurant to get information on the drug lord. After Steef learns that it was Markie that hit him with his car 16 years ago, he and Markie have a falling out. While hanging out in the back lot, Steef sees Murderball leave his Electronic cigarette on the ground and attempts to return it to him. Murderball is having an impassioned phone call in his RV, also in the back lot, during which he is up and walking around in the RV. When Steef sees this, he is amazed at the miracle that has occurred while Murderball is eager for Steef to forget what he's seen. Steef leaves to tell the other bussers what he saw and, in that time, Murderball has descended down a secret tunnel in his RV into a drug manufacturing lab, where he rules as kingpin. Steef returns to Murderball's RV so he can take him to the others and finds the tunnel. He descends and is captured. Markie is looking for Steef and also finds the tunnel. After descending, he, too, is captured. The two are about to be shot by Murderball. Murderball asks if they have any last words, at which point Markie tells Steef that it was the dog, not himself, that was driving and hit Steef that day 16 years ago and that he is so sorry. Steef forgives him. Suddenly a gilded revolver emerges from between the two of them and shoots Murderball before he can execute the two men. It is revealed that Steef's father was the true kingpin of the operation and Steef and his father have a brief reunion, which is cut short when the law arrives. Again the agencies have a dispute over authority and jurisdiction, during which time Steef's father, Markie, and Steef escape.

Following the chaos of the drug operation takedown, Markie is offered the promotion to waiter, which he declines because he already has everything he ever wanted in his friendship with Steef. Steef decides to return to school, and Markie moves on from Pam. The film ends with Pam and the waiter living in a small apartment with plumbing issues while Pam reads an article describing Markie's heroism. Pam puts her cigarette out on the waiter's neck in frustration.

== Cast ==
- David Spade as Markie Montgomery
- Theo Von as Steefen 'Steef' Barn
- Tim Dillon as Tim, the manager of the restaurant
- Trevor Wallace as Terry, Troy's son and a YouTube influencer
- Jay Pharoah as Crackhead, an undercover DEA agent
- Charlotte McKinney as Pam, Markie's girlfriend
- Chris Elliott as Troy, Steef and Markie's boss at We Suck
- Jimmy Gonzales as Murderball, a wheelchair-bound busboy and drug dealer
- Michelle Ortiz as April, a hostess at the restaurant
- Leah McKendrick as Romina, a busgirl at the restaurant
- Christian Gnecco Quintero as Rick, a model busboy
- Vanessa Gonzales as Ginger, fellow employee at the restaurant and Oscar's mother
- Tiago Martinez as Oscar, Ginger's son and a busser

== Production ==
In November 2024, David Spade and Theo Von, who also co-wrote and self-financed the film, were attached to produce and star in the film, which was directed by Jonah Feingold and produced by Robert Ogden Barnum. Jimmy Gonzales and Lindsey Normington were also part of the film's cast. Principal photography began at Los Angeles on January 10, 2025, with Jeff Leeds Cohn serving as the cinematographer. Nathan Floody edited the film. Chad Courneya and Hari Dafusia composed the score for the film, which includes "Roller" by Canadian rock band April Wine.

== Release ==
The film was released theatrically on April 17, 2026.
