= Teenage Sex and Death at Camp Miasma =

2026 film directed by Jane Schoenbrun

- Theatrical release poster
- Directed by: Jane Schoenbrun
- Written by: Jane Schoenbrun
- Produced by: Dede Gardner; Jeremy Kleiner
- Starring: Hannah Einbinder; Gillian Anderson; Jack Haven; Patrick Fischler
- Cinematography: Eric Yue
- Edited by: Graham Mason
- Music by: Alex G
- Production companies: Plan B Entertainment; Mubi
- Distributed by: Mubi
- Release dates: May 12, 2026 (Cannes); August 7, 2026 (United States)
- Running time: 112 minutes
- Country: United States
- Language: English
- Budget: $10 million
- Box office: $8.7 million

Teenage Sex and Death at Camp Miasma is a 2026 American slasher film written and directed by Jane Schoenbrun. It stars Hannah Einbinder and Gillian Anderson, with Jack Haven and Patrick Fischler in supporting roles. The film, a satire of traditional horror which incorporates diverse stylistic aspects, follows a filmmaker (Einbinder) who is hired to direct a new installment of the fictional slasher franchise Camp Miasma, and becomes fixated on casting the actress (Anderson) who played the final girl in the original film.

The film premiered at the 2026 Cannes Film Festival on May 12 as the opening film of the Un Certain Regard section, where it won the Queer Palm. It was given a limited theatrical release in the United States on August 7, 2026, expanding to more theaters on August 14, before a much wider release on August 21.

== Plot ==
Camp Miasma is a long-running slasher franchise that originated in 1983. Its recurring villain is "Little Death", the ghost of a child who in life transformed from a boy to a girl at weekly intervals. After being drowned by hateful campers, Little Death periodically rises from the lake that borders Camp Miasma and uses a spear to slaughter everyone they find. Though the series' earlier installments were successful, a spate of low-quality, unprofitable sequels has left it in limbo.

Queer filmmaker Kris Williams is hired to direct a reboot of Camp Miasma. Though she knows she has been selected to make the franchise's transphobic premise more palatable to a modern audience, Kris feels genuine attachment to the series, owing to her childhood experiences watching it. She is particularly interested in casting Billy Presley, an actress who abruptly retired after playing a camp counselor in the original film. She travels to the Pacific Northwest to meet with Billy, who, she discovers, lives on the abandoned campgrounds used to film the series. Billy is warm, perceptive, and obsessed with Little Death. Kris quickly opens up to her, discussing her dissatisfaction in her polyamorous relationship. Billy dismisses Kris' overly academic interpretation of the series, but expresses interest in acting again. To her agent's chagrin, Kris becomes convinced that the reboot should star Billy in her original role.

Kris and Billy watch the original Camp Miasma together. Kris knows the film by heart and points out lines and filming techniques while watching—one of these techniques being a split diopter shot—although Billy appears uncomfortable during the screening. Kris is especially fond of an image in a sex scene featuring a close-up of Billy's eye with Little Death reflected in it, but the campgrounds' power goes out just as the shot appears on screen. Kris and Billy return to Billy's house, where Kris initiates sex with Billy before abruptly stopping and lamenting that sex has always been difficult for her to enjoy, and that in order to enjoy it she has to imagine herself as the final girl in a slasher movie. Billy explains that she was sexually assaulted during the filming of the Camp Miasma sex scene, during which she learned to orgasm and enjoy sex by imagining that she is simultaneously herself, and Little Death watching her have sex and stabbing her. Kris admits that she can only enjoy sex if she fantasizes herself as a sexualized final girl. Billy encourages her to explore her fantasies and offers to "make a movie" with Kris.

The next morning, Kris has a pitch meeting with the studio executives. Instead of pitching a film, she explains that Little Death actually resides under the lake and imagines the world through the Camp Miasma films, and everyone, including Kris, are characters in one of their films. She then returns to the camp, where it is suddenly summer and Little Death has begun another killing spree. Billy encourages Kris to assume the role of the final girl. She is chased by Little Death and watches him kill her partner, agent, and the studio executives. Finally, Kris is chased to a cabin where Billy awaits. As the two have sex, Little Death approaches them; Kris initially pleads for her life before accepting her fate, appearing to have an orgasm as Little Death spears her and Billy simultaneously. In Little Death's lair under the lake, a VHS copy of a new film called Teenage Sex and Death at Camp Miasma appears.

The following morning, Kris and Billy revive. Still covered in blood, they leave the campgrounds, travel past the carnage left by Little Death, and return to the gas station where the original Camp Miasma began. After buying snacks, Kris repeats the lines spoken by a final girl in an earlier Camp Miasma film, claiming that she can still feel Little Death's presence at the bottom of the lake, where they are waiting to come for them once more. She and Billy smile at one another, before Kris is centered in a split diopter shot with Billy behind her. The two then walk away hand in hand.

== Cast ==
- Hannah Einbinder as Kris Williams, a young filmmaker hired to direct a reboot of the Camp Miasma franchise
  - Freya Edwards as young Kris
- Gillian Anderson as Billy Presley, a reclusive former actress and the final girl of the original Camp Miasma whom Kris becomes drawn to
  - Amanda Fix as young Billy
- Arthur Conti as Alex, a sexual partner of Billy's character in the Camp Miasma film
- Eva Victor as DJ Ella Giastic, a camp counsellor character in the Camp Miasma film
- Zach Cherry as Will, a camp counsellor character in the Camp Miasma film
- Sarah Sherman as Kris's agent
- Patrick Fischler as Rudolph, a gas station clerk in the Camp Miasma film
- Dylan Baker as Jeffrey, a studio executive
- Jasmin Savoy Brown as Mari, Kris's polyamorous partner
- Quintessa Swindell as Julie, the best friend of Billy's character in the Camp Miasma film
- Kevin McDonald as Anthony / County Sheriff, a hotel clerk who had a small recurring role in the Camp Miasma franchise
- Jack Haven as Little Death, a vengeful ghost who serves as the villain of Camp Miasma
- Aren Buchholz as Thor, Mari's male sexual partner
- Florence Barrett as Flo
- Ryan McEwen as doomed teenage boy
- Jess McLeod as Tracy, a studio executive
- Louise Weard as queer assistant

== Production ==
=== Development ===
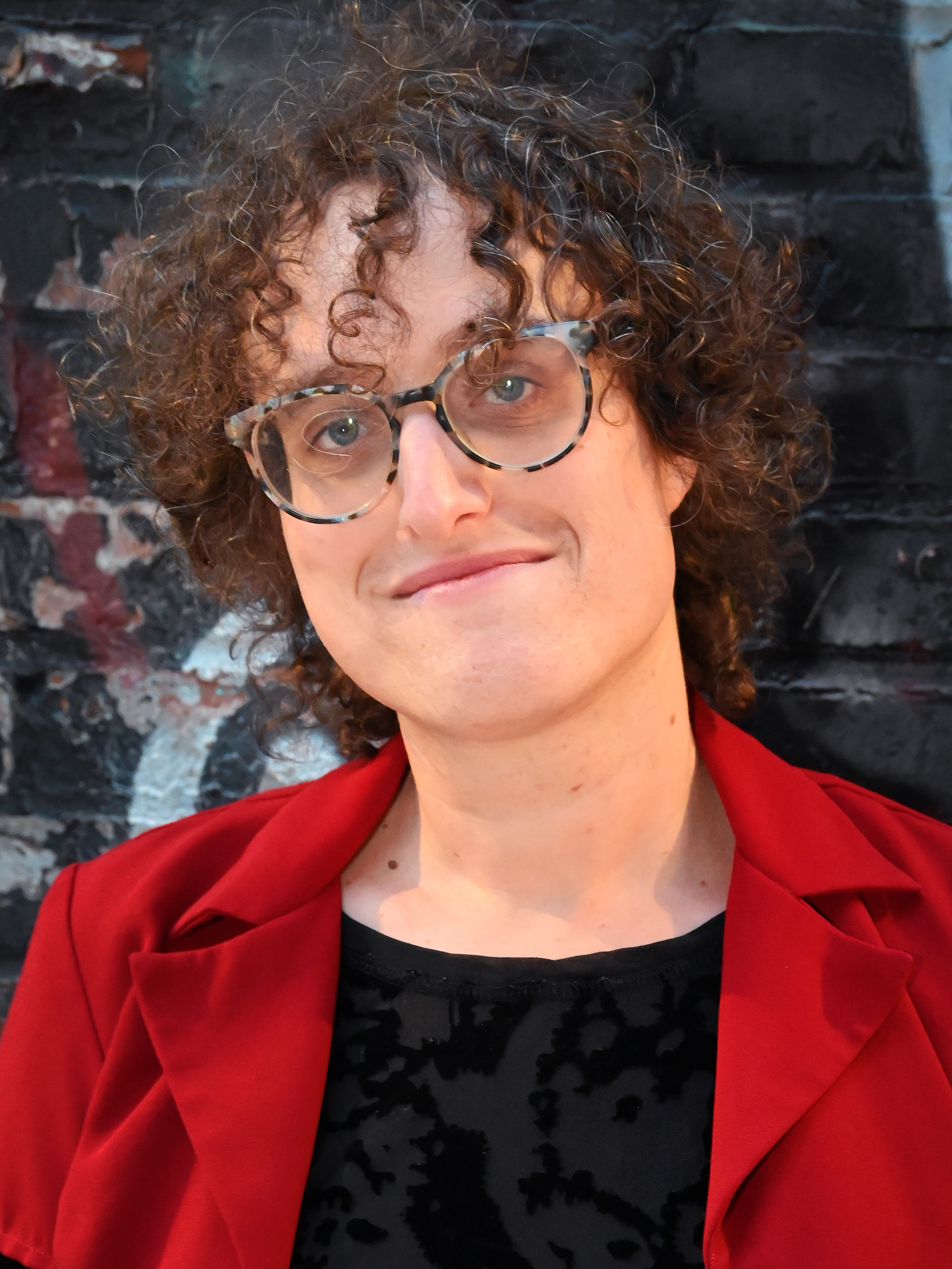
Writer-director Jane Schoenbrun in 2025

Jane Schoenbrun first discussed the project in June 2024, describing it to The New Yorker as a funny and grisly story. Speaking with Filmmaker Magazine, Schoenbrun elaborated that a significant theme would be learning to enjoy sex after transition, noting the difficulty of having good sex in the wrong body pre-transition. They also indicated the film would engage with the "problematic trans representation of horror films" seen in horror classics such as Psycho (1960), Sleepaway Camp (1983), The Silence of the Lambs (1991), and Texas Chainsaw Massacre: The Next Generation (1995). Schoenbrun intended to both honor and critique how those films, in their view, created and codified an idea of transness as monstrous. The director also likened the film's concept to Portrait of a Lady on Fire (2019) set in a Friday the 13th sequel. Another point of reference for the film was Bram Stoker's Dracula (1992), particularly for its Gothic, romantic quality and use of matte paintings.

After A24 passed on the film, Mubi came onboard to finance and distribute the film in select territories, with Plan B Entertainment on board to produce. Daniel Bekerman of Scythia Films served as an executive producer and oversaw local production services. The Match Factory managed remaining worldwide sales. Musician Alex G contributed music to the film, as he has with Schoenbrun's previous films: We're All Going to the World's Fair and I Saw the TV Glow.

=== Casting ===
Hannah Einbinder and Gillian Anderson were announced as the film's leads in May 2025. In February 2026, Amanda Fix, Arthur Conti, Eva Victor, Zach Cherry, Sarah Sherman, Patrick Fischler, Dylan Baker, Jasmin Savoy Brown, Quintessa Swindell, Kevin McDonald, and Jack Haven rounded out the cast.

=== Filming ===
Principal photography began in May 2025 in British Columbia and ended on June 17, 2025. Shooting specifically at the Totem and Macpherson Lodge at Camp Barnard happened on June 11–14. Camp Barnard is located outside of Sooke. Cinematographer Eric Yue shot the film on 35mm, marking his second collaboration with Schoenbrun following I Saw the TV Glow (2024).

== Themes ==
The film subverts several queer tropes from horror films. Schoenbrun points out that in French "little death" (la petite mort) is a euphemism for an orgasm. The movie references Lacan with themes of desire having the main character's first movie called Jouir Sans (lit. 'to enjoy without') as wordplay with jouissance.

== Release ==
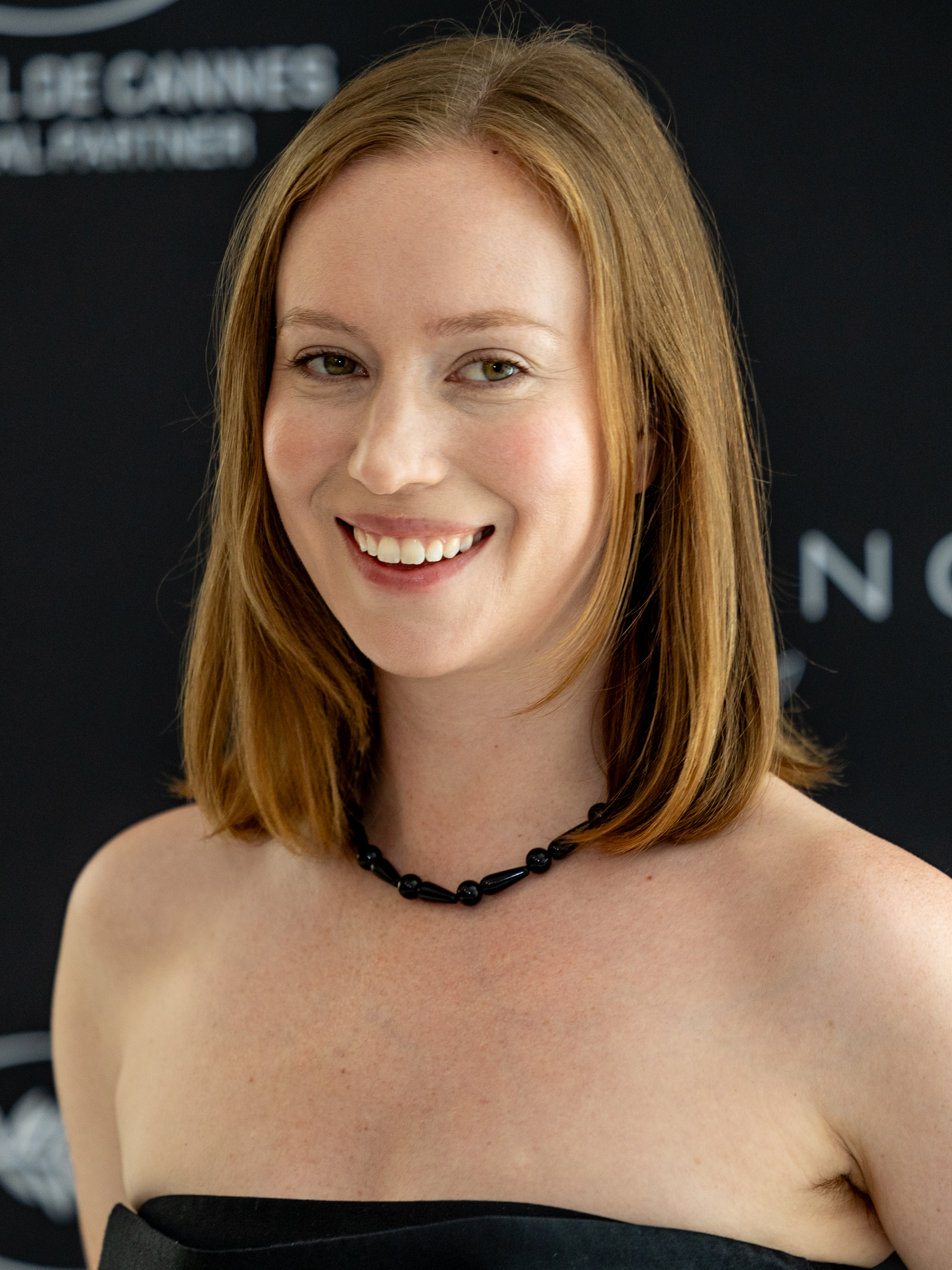
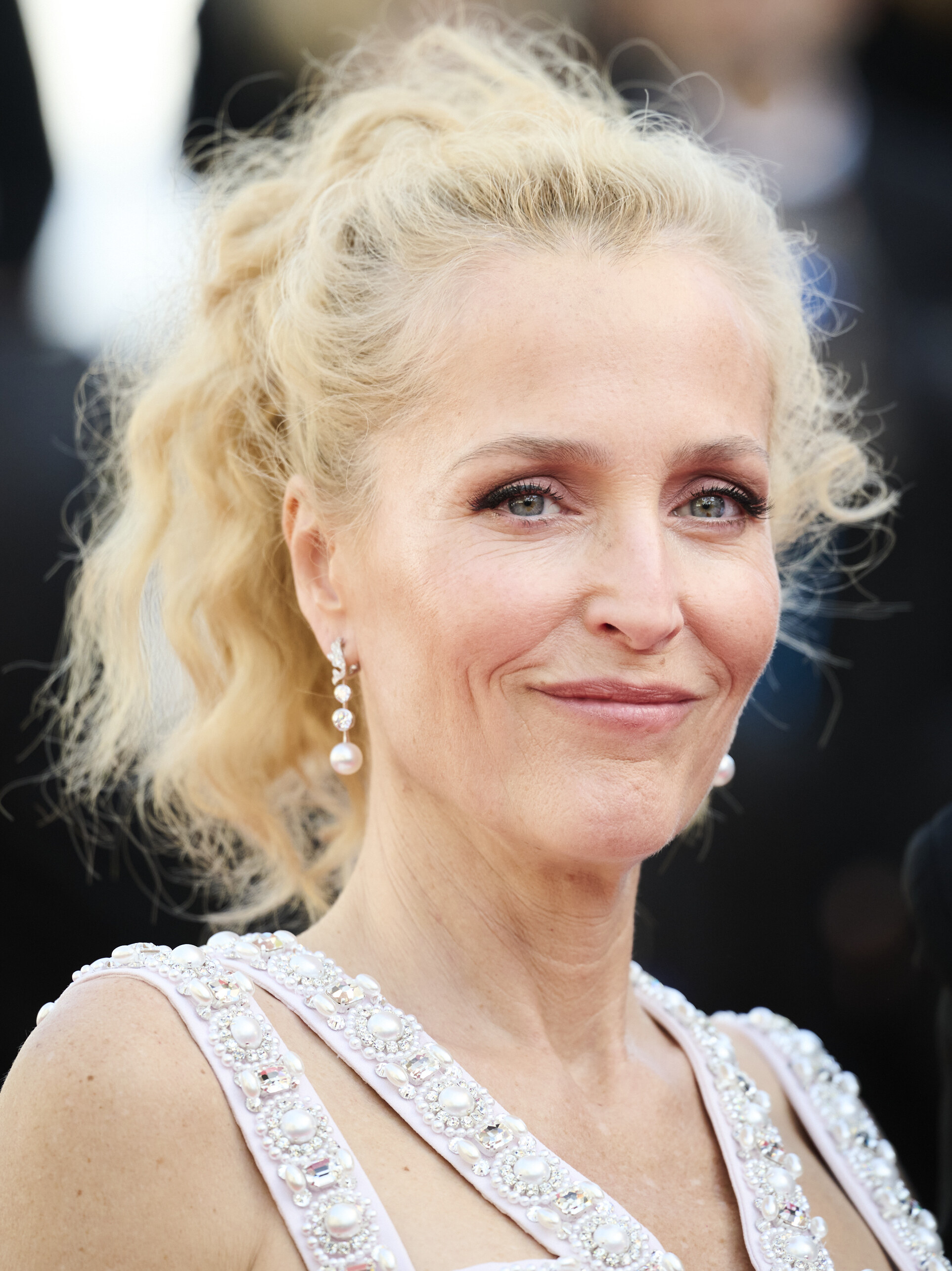
Hannah Einbinder and Gillian Anderson promoting Teenage Sex and Death at Camp Miasma at the 2026 Cannes Film Festival

Mubi planned to distribute the film across North and Latin America, the United Kingdom, Ireland, Germany, Austria, the Benelux, Italy, Spain, Turkey, India, Australia, and New Zealand. In November 2025, The Match Factory launched remaining worldwide sales at the American Film Market. The Match Factory sold rights to the film in the markets of Greece (Weirdwave), the Czech Republic and Slovakia (Zero Gravity), Poland (Velvet Spoon), Taiwan (Hooray Films), Scandinavia (Nonstop Entertainment), and Portugal (No Comboio).

The film had its world premiere at the 79th Cannes Film Festival on May 13, 2026, as the opening film of the Un Certain Regard section. It also made it to the international competition lineup of the 30th Bucheon International Fantastic Film Festival (BiFan), and was released in the United States on August 7, 2026. Early screenings, dubbed "Camp is in Session", took place in select North American theaters from June 1 to July 25, 2026, with some of these having Q&As from director Schoenbrun and lead actress Einbinder.

It will be screened in the Gala section of 39th Tokyo International Film Festival on 2 November 2026.

The film officially released for streaming on Mubi on October 2, 2026.

== Reception ==
=== Critical response ===
On the review aggregator website Rotten Tomatoes, 94% of 278 critics' reviews are positive, with an average rating of 8.2/10. The website's consensus reads: "A bloody valentine to slasher horror that celebrates personal self-discovery as much as it does the possibilities of cinema, Teenage Sex and Death at Camp Miasma combines killer style with a big, still-beating heart." Metacritic, which uses a weighted average, assigned the film a score of 89 out of 100, based on 48 critics, indicating "universal acclaim".

Robbie Collin of The Telegraph rated the film 5 out of 5 stars, lauding it as a "an extravagantly funny, recklessly bizarre and unsettling satire of/paean to 'problematic cinema'". Stephanie Zacharek of Time deemed the film to be "funny, charming, even breezy at times", describing what Gillian Anderson does in it as "sublime". Richard Brody of The New Yorker deemed the film to be "the richest [picture in Schoenbrun's filmography] in terms of the multiple dimensions of cinematic experience that it dramatizes, critiques, and illuminates". Amy Nicholson of the Los Angeles Times considered the film a "witty, gory slasher-romance" in which Schoenbrun "essentially sliced out their soul and smeared it on the screen". Javier Ocaña of El País determined the film to be "referential yet fascinatingly creative". Writing for the Conversation, professor of theatre at the College of the Holy Cross Scott Malia wrote that the film "revolutionizes queer horror".

=== Accolades ===
Award	Date of ceremony	Category	Recipient(s)	Result	Ref.
Cannes Film Festival	May 23, 2026	Un Certain Regard	Jane Schoenbrun	Nominated	
Cannes Film Festival	May 23, 2026	Queer Palm	Jane Schoenbrun	Won	
San Sebastián International Film Festival	September 26, 2026	Zabaltegi-Tabakalera Award	Teenage Sex and Death at Camp Miasma	Won	
Gotham Independent Film Awards	November 30, 2026	Best Feature	Jane Schoenbrun, Dede Gardner, Jeremy Kleiner	Pending	
Gotham Independent Film Awards	November 30, 2026	Best Director	Jane Schoenbrun	Pending	
Gotham Independent Film Awards	November 30, 2026	Outstanding Lead Performance	Gillian Anderson	Pending	

== See also ==
- List of films featuring fictional films
