= Lex Walton =

American singer, songwriter and actress

Alexandria Walton (born 2001), known professionally as Alex or Lex Walton, is an American singer, songwriter, actress, prose poet, and filmmaker.

From 2020 to 2024 Walton joined multiple bands in addition to releasing solo music. She also starred as the character Circle in Louise Weard's, 2025 film Castration Movie Anthology ii. The Best of Both Worlds.

== Life and career ==
Lex Walton was born in 2001 in Pleasant Hill, and grew up California's East Bay. She started releasing music in 2018 at the age of 17. She later moved to Boston, where she started the independent label Youth Against Satan, and released her first and second solo albums under the Lex Walton moniker. In 2020 she released Shame Music, her first album to attract public attention.

Walton has cited Takashi Mizutani of Les Rallizes Dénudés as her biggest inspiration for her music. She released a cover of "White Awakening" when his death was announced in 2021.

In her songs, Walton explores her transgender identity, making her an openly trans artist. This would catch the attention of Louise Weard, as she met her criteria for a role, in 2025 she was promptly cast in Castration Movie Anthology ii. The Best of Both Worlds, her biggest role to this date.

She has recorded collaborations with artists such as Devi McCallion (Black Dresses, Girls Rituals), Geese, and Ezra Furman. In August 2026 she signed with Sub Pop Records, for the release of her album ULTIMATE LOVE FOREVER.

== Discography ==
- Tapes of Agony (2018)
- The End of Group Sounds (2018)
- SHAME MUSIC (2020)
- OUR DESIRE LACKS KNOWING MUSIC (2023)
- I WANT YOU TO KILL ME (2023)
- SHAME MUSIC 2 (2024)
- ULTIMATE LOVE FOREVER (2026)
