= Eric Yue =

American cinematographer

Eric K. Yue
- Born: Flushing, Queens
- Website: ericyue.com

Eric Yue is an American cinematographer.

== Early life ==
Yue was born in Flushing, Queens.

== Filmography ==
Year	Title	Director	Notes
2019	The Giant	David Raboy	
2023	A Thousand and One	A.V. Rockwell	
2024	I Saw the TV Glow	Jane Schoenbrun	
2025	Atropia	Hailey Gates	
2026	Teenage Sex and Death at Camp Miasma	Jane Schoenbrun	
