= The Giant (2019 film) =

- Directed by: David Raboy
- Screenplay by: David Raboy
- Produced by: Dennis Masel; Daniel Dewes; Rachael Fung; Gary Farkas; Clement Lepoutre; Olivier Muller
- Starring: Odessa Young
- Cinematography: Eric K. Yue
- Edited by: David Raboy
- Music by: Ari Balouzian
- Production companies: Bogie Films; Vixens; Extra A Productions
- Distributed by: Camera Ready Pictures
- Release dates: September 2019 (TIFF); November 13, 2020
- Running time: 99 minutes
- Countries: United States; France
- Language: English

The Giant is a 2019 French-American mystery crime thriller film written and directed by David Raboy and starring Odessa Young. It is Raboy's feature directorial debut.

== Plot summary ==
A girl named Charlotte and her friends, including Olivia, Will, Brady, Lauren and Joe, are graduating from high school in Monroeville, Alabama. It is established that Charlotte's boyfriend was previously a young man named Joe, but that they separated due to a traumatic event which involved Charlotte's mother's death, the death of one of Charlotte's friends, and Joe's claims of a giant with thunderous footsteps. After this traumatic event, Joe is shunned by the other friends. Still, Joe and Charlotte meet up occasionally for long nighttime drives. Joe often remarks that it doesn't matter if good memories are dreams or reality. Charlotte and Olivia make a promise to keep each other safe.

Several girls in Charlotte's class die or are murdered by various causes, including Brady's girlfriend. Brady begins acting strangely and, expressing belief that his girlfriend was murdered by someone, tells Charlotte that "he" catches people at parties and she is just "his" type. Charlotte's father, who appears to be a local policeman, expresses concern about the murders and wants Charlotte to avoid going to parties and events with her friends, but allows her to do so anyway. Charlotte often flirts with Will during various parties.

Attempting to contact Joe, Charlotte and Olivia find his house ruined and his car crashed and bloodstained, but do not find his body.

Charlotte goes visit a dilapidated house which her family used to live in before her mother's death. She recalls her mother often standing facing the house's back door, telling her that "life seems full of hope, but I've come to know better, and I'm afraid you will too." During a visit to the old house, Charlotte dreams of a shadowy giant who tries to choke her to death, but she wakes up in her own bed with Olivia nearby.

Eventually, the friends host a birthday party for Olivia in the old house. Upon arriving, Charlotte tells Olivia that she feels that hosting the party in this house is a bad omen and that something terrible will happen. Olivia is drunk and does not want to leave at first, but eventually agrees when Charlotte reminds her of the promise they made to keep each other safe. Charlotte and Olivia walk to Olivia's car. Olivia then tells Charlotte to go back to the house to find her shoes before they leave. Charlotte agrees, but as soon as she reaches the door, Olivia drives off. Charlotte becomes very concerned for Olivia's safety, but Will tells here there is nothing to be afraid of, and asks her if she is afraid of the giant. He tries to kiss Charlotte but Charlotte pulls away.

A storm begins outside with steady blasts of thunder that almost sound like footsteps. Lauren comes out of the basement half-dressed and injured. Charlotte attempts to take care of her but she wanders off. Most of the partygoers wander out the house's back door to meet the giant. The shadow of the giant is seen in the rain and thunder. Charlotte wanders upstairs and finds Joe. Joe appears to be dirty and injured. Joe again repeats that it does not matter if a good memory was a dream or reality. Charlotte attempts to kiss Joe but he pulls away. Someone begins to choke Charlotte and she says she can't breathe, but Joe says he is not touching her. Joe, and the choking hands, then vanish.

Charlotte wanders downstairs and sees that the house is empty and silent. She walks out the backdoor and sees her friends running and screaming from the giant. She runs at first, then stops and turns to meet the giant. Next, Charlotte wakes up from a dream, having fallen asleep on a drive in the car with Olivia.

== Cast ==
- Odessa Young as Charlotte
- Ben Schnetzer as Joe
- Jack Kilmer as Will
- Madelyn Cline as Olivia
- Danny Ramirez as Brady
- PJ Marshall as Rex

== Release ==
The film premiered at the Toronto International Film Festival in September 2019. The film was released in North America on November 13, 2020, via Vertical Entertainment.

== Reception ==
On the review aggregator website Rotten Tomatoes, 57% of 14 critics' reviews are positive.

Andrew Barker of Variety gave the film a negative review and wrote "But Raboy gives us so little to hang onto – be it an arresting image, a palpable touch of the uncanny, or a moment of real tension – that it gets harder and harder to want to follow him."

Caryn James of The Hollywood Reporter also gave the film a negative review, calling it "Well-directed but hollow and tiresome."
