= Todd Haynes =

American filmmaker (born 1961)

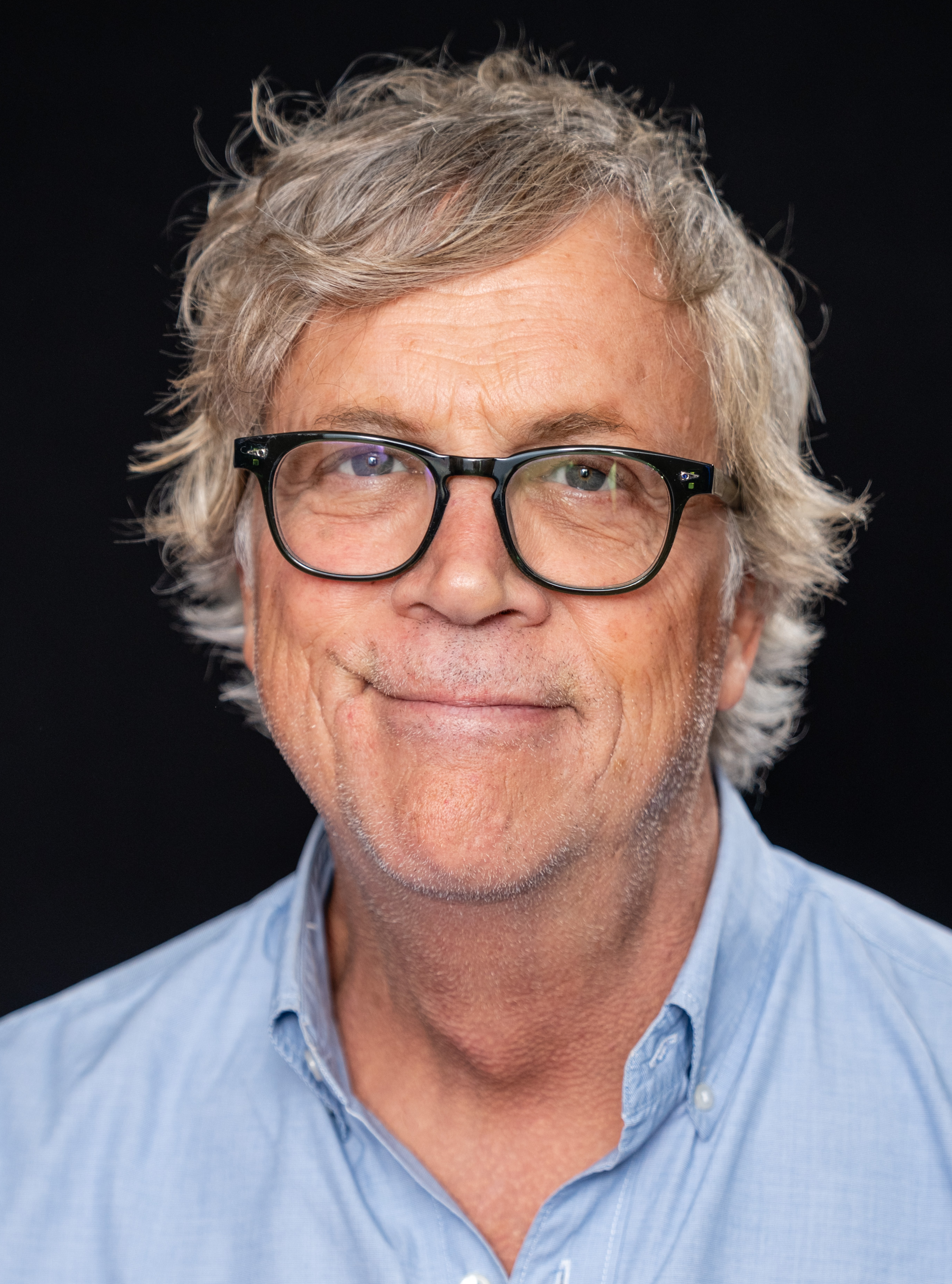
- Haynes in 2023
- Born: January 2, 1961 (age 65); Los Angeles, California, U.S.
- Education: Brown University (BA); Bard College (MFA)
- Occupations: Film director; screenwriter; producer
- Years active: 1985–present

Todd Haynes (/heɪnz/; born January 2, 1961) is an American film director, screenwriter, and producer whose work is known for its engagement with melodrama, historical pastiche, and queer cinema. Across four decades, his films frequently explore the emotional and psychological consequences of social repression, particularly as they relate to sexuality, identity, illness, and conformity. Haynes is often associated with the New Queer Cinema movement of the early 1990s and is noted for reworking classical Hollywood forms — such as the woman’s picture and the biopic — to examine marginalized experiences and unspoken desire.

Haynes first gained public attention with his controversial short film Superstar: The Karen Carpenter Story (1987), which chronicles singer Karen Carpenter's life and death using Barbie dolls as actors. (Note: Haynes had not obtained proper licensing to use the Carpenters' music, prompting a lawsuit from Richard Carpenter, whom the film portrayed in an unflattering light, banning the film's distribution.) Superstar became a cult classic. His feature directorial debut, Poison (1991), a provocative exploration of AIDS-era perceptions and subversions, established him as a figure of a new transgressive cinema. Poison won the Sundance Film Festival's Grand Jury Prize.

Haynes received further acclaim for his second feature film, Safe (1995), a symbolic portrait of a housewife who develops multiple chemical sensitivity. Safe was later voted the best film of the 1990s by The Village Voice Film Poll. His next feature, Velvet Goldmine (1998), is a tribute to the 1970s glam rock era. The film received the Special Jury Prize for Best Artistic Contribution at the 1998 Cannes Film Festival.

Haynes gained acclaim and a measure of mainstream success with Far from Heaven (2002), receiving his first Academy Award nomination for Best Original Screenplay. He continued to direct critically lauded films such as I'm Not There (2007), Carol (2015), Wonderstruck (2017), Dark Waters (2019), and May December (2023), as well as the documentary film The Velvet Underground (2021). Haynes also directed and co-wrote the HBO mini-series Mildred Pierce (2011), for which he received three Primetime Emmy Award nominations.

== Early life and education ==
Haynes was born January 2, 1961, in Los Angeles, and grew up in the city's Encino neighborhood. His father, Allen E. Haynes, was a cosmetics importer, and his mother, Sherry Lynne (née Semler), studied acting. Haynes is Jewish on his mother's side. His younger sister is Gwynneth Haynes of the band Sophe Lux.

Haynes developed an interest in film at an early age, and produced a short film, The Suicide (1978), while still in high school. He studied art and semiotics at Brown University, where he directed his first short film Assassins: A Film Concerning Rimbaud (1985), inspired by the French poet Arthur Rimbaud (a personality Haynes would later reference in his film I'm Not There). At Brown, he met Christine Vachon, who would go on to produce all of his feature films. After graduating from Brown, Haynes moved to New York City and became involved in the independent film scene, launching Apparatus Productions, a non-profit organization for the support of independent film.

According to Cinematic/Sexual: An Interview with Todd Haynes, in response to whether his academic background affected his film-making practice, Haynes stated that his high school teacher taught him a valuable lesson: "Reality can't be a criterion for judging the success or failure of a film, or its effect on you. It was a simple, but eye-opening, way of approaching film."

== Career ==
=== 1987–1993: Early work and feature debut ===
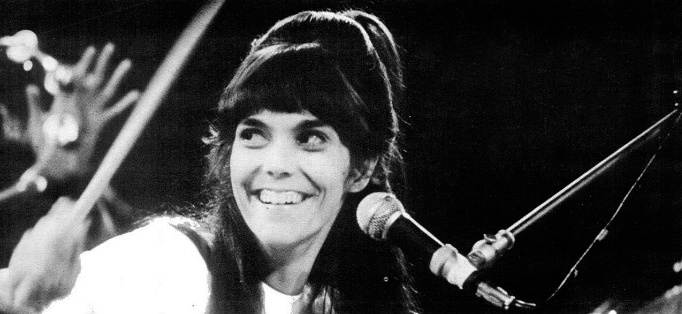
Haynes directed his first short based on Karen Carpenter called Superstar: The Karen Carpenter Story (1987)

In 1987, while an MFA student at Bard College, Haynes made a short, Superstar: The Karen Carpenter Story, which chronicles the life of American pop singer Karen Carpenter, using Barbie dolls as actors. The film presents Carpenter's struggle with anorexia and bulimia, featuring several close-ups of Ipecac (the nonprescription drug Carpenter was reputed to have used to make herself vomit during her illness). Carpenter's chronic weight loss was portrayed by using a "Karen" Barbie doll with the face and body whittled away with a knife, leaving the doll looking skeletonized.

Superstar featured extensive use of Carpenter songs, showcasing Haynes's love of popular music (which would be a recurring feature of later films). Haynes failed to obtain proper licensing to use the music, prompting a lawsuit from Karen's brother Richard for copyright infringement. Carpenter was reportedly also offended by Haynes's unflattering portrayal of him as a narcissistic bully, along with several broadly dropped suggestions that he was gay and in the closet. Carpenter won his lawsuit, and Superstar was removed from public distribution; to date, it may not be viewed publicly. Bootlegged versions of the film are still circulated, and the film is sporadically made available on YouTube.

Haynes's 1991 feature film debut, Poison, garnered him further acclaim and controversy. Drawing on the writings of gay writer Jean Genet, the film is a triptych of queer-themed narratives, each adopting a different cinematic genre: vox-pop documentary ("Hero"), 50s sci-fi horror ("Horror") and gay prisoner romantic drama ("Homo"). The film explores traditional perceptions of homosexuality as an unnatural and deviant force, and presents Genet's vision of sado-masochistic gay relations as a subversion of heterosexual norms, culminating with a marriage ceremony between two gay male convicts. Poison marked Haynes's first collaboration with his longtime producer Christine Vachon.

Poison was partially funded with a grant from the National Endowment for the Arts (NEA), "at a time when the agency was under attack from conservative groups for using public funds to support sexually explicit works". This, along with the film's sexual themes, was a source of controversy. The film subsequently became the center of a public campaign against the film by Reverend Donald Wildmon, head of the American Family Association, who criticized the NEA for funding Poison and other works by gay and lesbian artists and filmmakers. Wildmon, who had not viewed the film before making his comments, condemned the film's "explicit porno scenes of homosexuals involved in anal sex", despite no such scenes appearing in the film. Poison went on to win the 1991 Sundance Film Festival's Grand Jury Prize, establishing Haynes as an emerging talent and the voice of a new transgressive generation. The film writer B. Ruby Rich cited Poison as one of the defining films of the emerging New Queer Cinema movement, with its focus on maverick sexuality as an anti-establishment social force.

Haynes's next short film, Dottie Gets Spanked (1993), explored the experiences of a quiet and gentle six-year-old boy in the early 1960s who has various indirect encounters with spanking, most significantly involving his idol, a TV sitcom star named Dottie. The film was aired on PBS.

=== 1995–1998: Rise to prominence ===
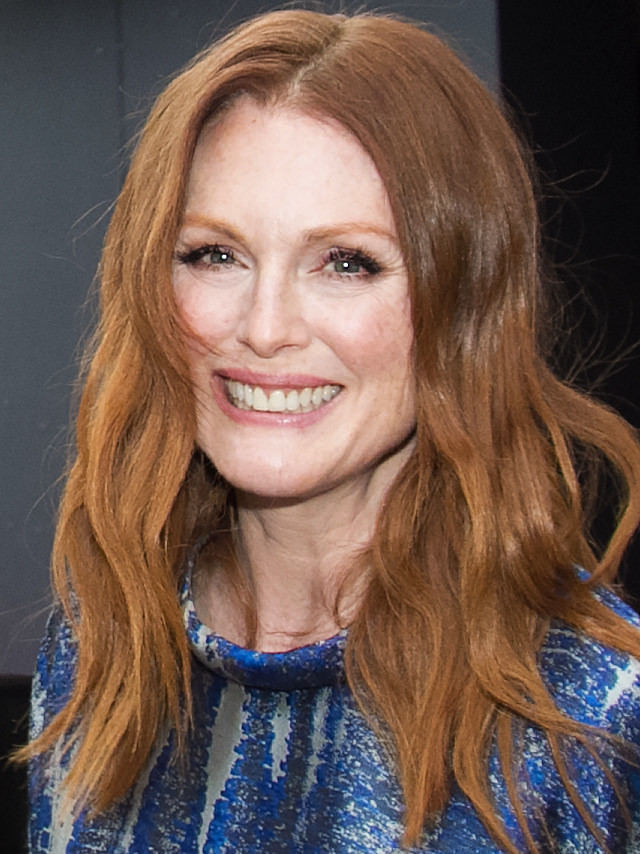
Haynes and Julianne Moore first collaborated with Safe. She would go on to act in his films Far from Heaven (2002) and May December (2023)

Haynes's second feature film, Safe (1995), was a critically acclaimed portrait of Carol White, a San Fernando Valley housewife (played by Julianne Moore) who develops violent allergies to her middle-class suburban existence. After a series of extreme allergic reactions and hospitalization, Carol diagnoses herself with acute environmental illness, and moves to a New Age commune in the New Mexico desert run by an HIV positive "guru" who preaches both that the real world is toxic and unsafe for Carol, and that she is responsible for her illness and recovery. The film ends with Carol retreating to her antiseptic, prison-like "safe room", looking at herself in the mirror and whispering "I love you" to her reflection.

The film is notable for its critical (though not entirely unsympathetic) treatment of its main character. Julie Grossman argues in her article "The Trouble With Carol" that Haynes concludes the film as a challenge to traditional Hollywood film narratives of the heroine taking charge of her life, and that Haynes sets Carol up as the victim both of a repressive male-dominated society, and also of an equally debilitating self-help culture that encourages patients to take sole responsibility for their illness and recovery. Carol's illness, although unidentified, has been read as an analogy for the AIDS crisis of the mid-1980s, as a similarly uncomfortable and largely unspoken "threat" in 1980s Reaganist America. Safe was critically acclaimed, giving Moore her first leading role in a feature film, and gave Haynes a measure of mainstream critical recognition. It was voted the best film of the 1990s by the Village Voice's Critic Poll. The film historian David Thomson later described it as "one of the most arresting, original and accomplished films of the 1990s".

Haynes took a radical shift in direction for his next feature, Velvet Goldmine (1998), starring Christian Bale, Ewan McGregor, Jonathan Rhys-Meyers and Toni Collette. The film's title takes its name from David Bowie's song "Velvet Goldmine". Filmed and set mostly in England, the film was an intentionally chaotic tribute to the 1970s glam rock era, drawing heavily on the rock histories and mythologies of glam rockers David Bowie, Iggy Pop and Lou Reed. Starting with Oscar Wilde as the spiritual godfather of glam rock, the film revels in the gender and identity experimentation and fashionable bisexuality of the era, and acknowledges the transformative power of glam rock as an escape and a form of self-expression for gay teenagers.

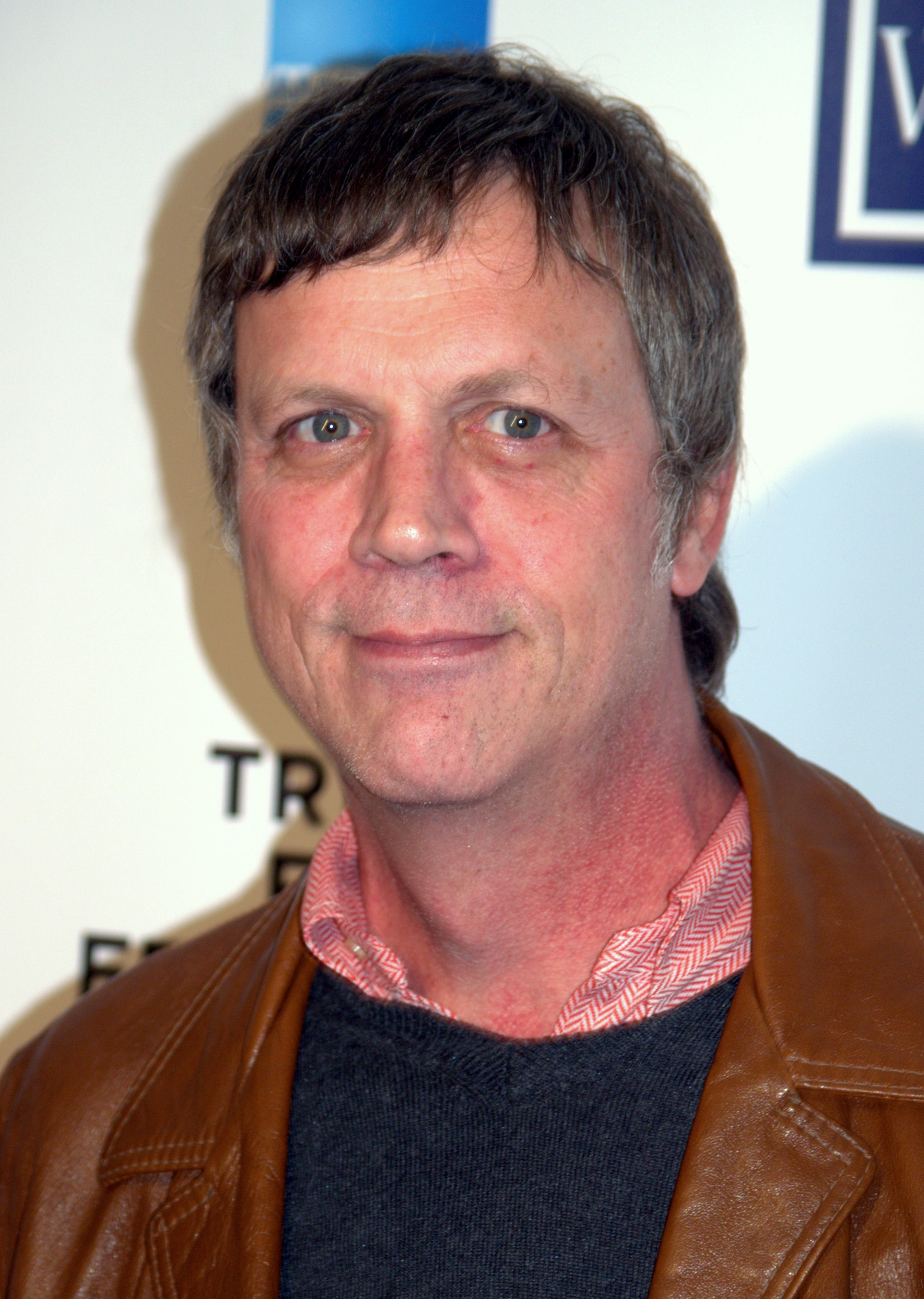
Haynes at the Tribeca Film Festival in 2009

The film follows the character of Arthur (Bale) an English journalist once enraptured by glam rock as a 1970s teenager, who returns a decade later to hunt down his former heroes: Brian Slade (Rhys Meyers), a feather boa-wearing androgyne with an alter ego, "Maxwell Demon", who resembles Bowie in his Ziggy Stardust incarnation, and Curt Wild (McGregor), an Iggy Pop-style rocker. The narrative playfully rewrites glam rock myths which in some cases sail close to the truth. Slade flirts with bisexuality and decadence before staging his own death in a live performance and disappearing from the scene, echoing Bowie's own disavowal of glam rock in the late 1970s and his subsequent re-creation as an avowedly heterosexual pop star. The film features a love affair between Slade and Wild's characters, recalling rumors about Bowie and Reed's supposed sexual relationship. Curt Wild's character has a flashback to enforced electric shock treatment as a teenager to attempt to cure his homosexuality, echoing Reed's teenage experiences as a victim of the homophobic medical profession.

Haynes was keen to use original music from the glam rock period, and (learning his lesson from Superstar) approached David Bowie before making the film for permission to use his music in the soundtrack. Bowie declined, leaving Haynes to use a combination of original songs from other artists, such as Brian Eno and Roxy Music, and glam-rock inspired music written by contemporary rock bands for the film, including Shudder to Think. Velvet Goldmine premiered in main competition at the 1998 Cannes Film Festival, winning a special jury award for Best Artistic Contribution. Despite the initial critical praise, the film received mixed reviews from critics. Costume designer Sandy Powell received an Academy Award nomination for her costume design and won the Oscar in the same year for her work on Shakespeare In Love.

=== 2002–2014: Career progression and acclaim ===
Haynes achieved his greatest critical and commercial success to date with Far from Heaven (2002), a 1950s-set drama inspired by the films of Douglas Sirk about a Connecticut housewife Cathy Whittaker (Julianne Moore) who discovers that her husband (Dennis Quaid) is secretly gay, and subsequently falls in love with Raymond, her African-American gardener (Dennis Haysbert). The film works as a mostly reverential and unironic tribute to Sirk's filmmaking, lovingly re-creating the stylized mise-en-scene, colors, costumes, cinematography and lighting of Sirkian melodrama. Cathy and Raymond's relationship resembles Jane Wyman and Rock Hudson's inter-class love affair in All That Heaven Allows, and Cathy's relationship with Sybil, her African-American housekeeper (Viola Davis) recalls Lana Turner and Juanita Moore's friendship in Imitation of Life. While staying within the cinematic language of the period, Haynes updates the sexual and racial politics, showing scenarios (an interracial love affair and gay relationships) that would not have been permissible in Sirk's era. Haynes also resists a Sirkian happy ending, allowing the film to finish on a melancholy note closer in tone to the "weepy" melodramas of the 1940s and 1950s cinema such as Mildred Pierce.

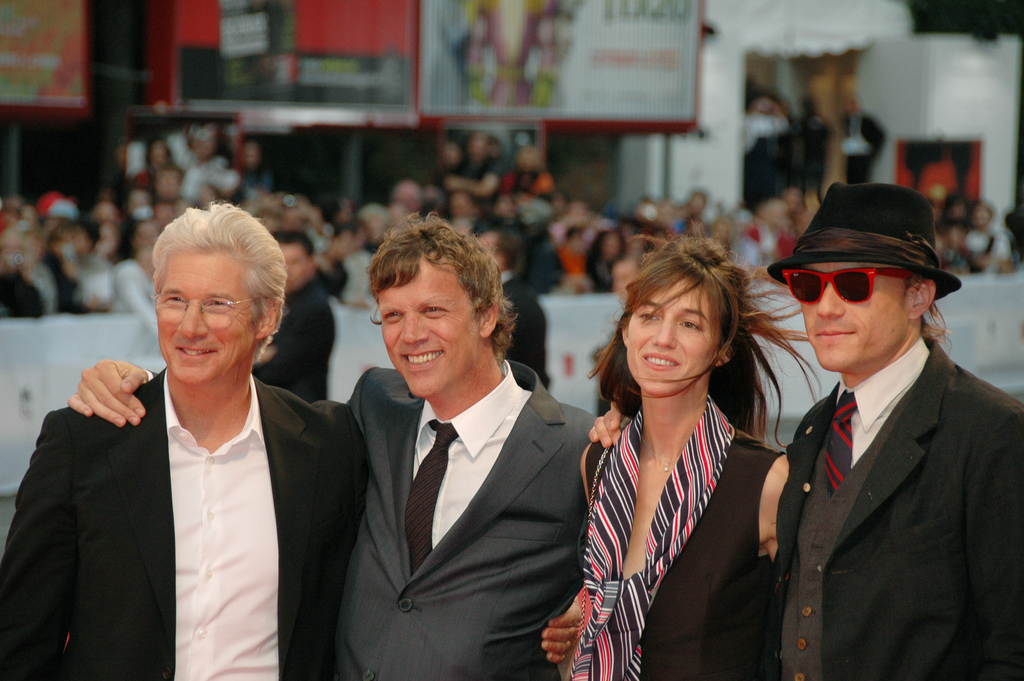
Todd Haynes and actors of his 2007 film, I'm Not There, posing at the 64th Venice Film Festival in 2007

Far from Heaven debuted at the Venice Film Festival to widespread critical acclaim and garnered a slew of film awards, including the Volpi Cup for Moore, and four Academy Award nominations: lead actress for Moore, Haynes's original screenplay, Elmer Bernstein's score, and Edward Lachman's cinematography. Far from Heaven lost in all four categories, but the film's success was hailed as a breakthrough for independent film achieving mainstream recognition and brought Haynes to the attention of a wider mainstream audience.

In another radical shift in direction, Haynes's next film I'm Not There (2007) returned to the mythology of popular music, portraying the life and legend of Bob Dylan through seven fictional characters played by six actors: Richard Gere, Cate Blanchett, Marcus Carl Franklin, Heath Ledger, Ben Whishaw and Christian Bale. Haynes obtained Dylan's approval to proceed with the film, and the rights to use his music in the soundtrack, after presenting a one-page summary of the film's concept to Jeff Rosen, Dylan's long-time manager. I'm Not There premiered at the Venice Film Festival to critical acclaim, where Haynes won the Grand Jury Prize and Blanchett won the Volpi Cup, eventually receiving an Academy Award nomination for Best Supporting Actress.

Haynes's next project was Mildred Pierce, a five-hour miniseries for HBO based on the novel by James M. Cain and the 1945 film starring Joan Crawford. The series starred Kate Winslet in the title role and featured Guy Pearce, Evan Rachel Wood, Melissa Leo, James LeGros and Hope Davis. Filming was completed in mid-2010 and the series began airing on HBO on 27 March 2011. It received 21 Primetime Emmy Award nominations, winning five, and Winslet won a Golden Globe Award for her performance.

=== 2015–2019: Established career ===
Haynes's sixth feature film, Carol, is an adaptation of the 1952 novel The Price of Salt by Patricia Highsmith. The cast features Cate Blanchett, Rooney Mara, Sarah Paulson and Kyle Chandler. The film premiered in competition at the 2015 Cannes Film Festival, where it won the Queer Palm and a shared Best Actress prize for Mara. Carol received critical acclaim and was nominated for 6 Academy Awards, 5 Golden Globe Awards, 9 BAFTA Awards, and 6 Independent Spirit Awards. Geoffrey McNab of The Independent praised the film praising Haynes writing "In sly and subversive fashion, Haynes is laying bare the tensions in a society that refuses to acknowledge "difference" of any sort". McNabb added, "They are both helped that in Todd Haynes, they have a director who is sensitive to every last nuance in their performances".

On October 20, 2017, Haynes's Wonderstruck was released, having premiered at the 2017 Cannes Film Festival on May 18, 2017. The film is an adaptation of Brian Selznick's children's book of the same name. Wonderstruck stars Julianne Moore and is produced by Haynes's collaborator Christine Vachon and Amazon Studios, which is also distributing the film. The movie describes two deaf children, one in 1927 and the other in 1977, who embark on separate quests to find themselves. When asked why he'd made a children's movie, in his October 15, 2017, NPR interview, Haynes explained, "I felt like it spoke to something indomitable about the nature of kids and the ability for kids to be confronted with challenges and the unknown and to keep muscling through those challenges." The film received mixed reviews but earned praise for Edward Lachman's black-and-white cinematography.

Haynes directed a film titled Dark Waters for Participant Media. The film is based on Nathaniel Rich's New York Times Magazine article “The Lawyer Who Became DuPont's Worst Nightmare,” which is about corporate defense attorney Robert Bilott and his environmental lawsuit against the American conglomerate DuPont. Mark Ruffalo and Anne Hathaway star, and principal photography began in January 2019, in Cincinnati. The film was released on November 22, 2019.

=== 2021–present ===
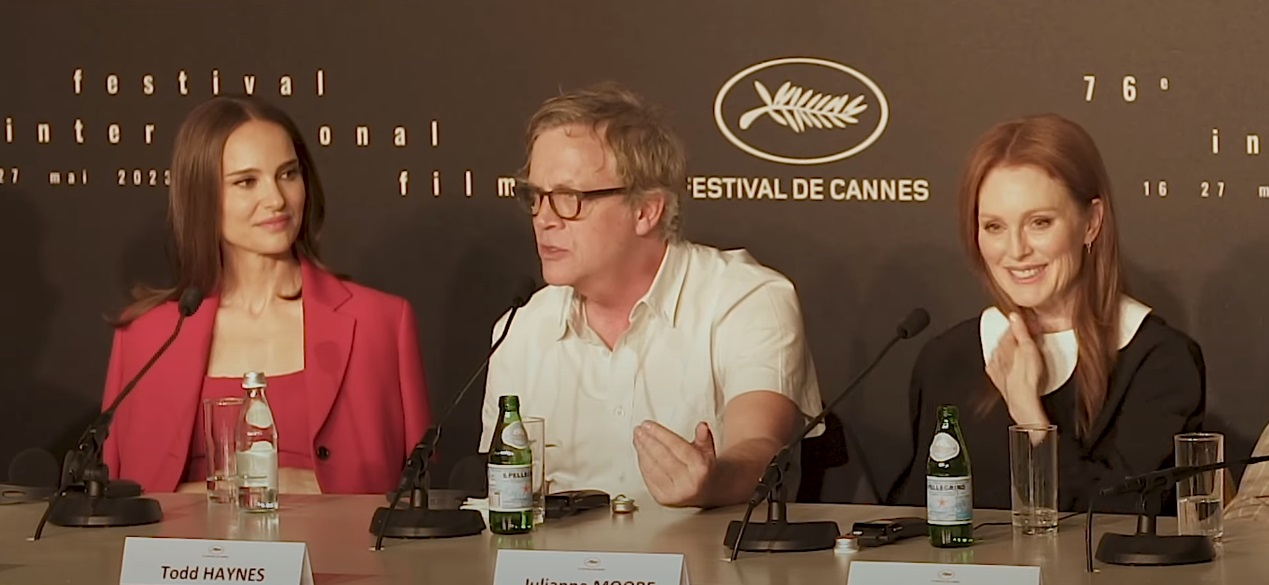
Natalie Portman, Haynes, and Julianne Moore at the 2023 Cannes Film Festival promoting May December

Haynes's premiered his first documentary feature, The Velvet Underground, at the Cannes Film Festival on July 7, 2021, and it went on to be released on October 15, 2021, in theaters and on Apple TV+, to critical acclaim. The film rejects documentary biopic tropes, evoking a place and time through extensive use of montage. “What montage can do is always more sophisticated than we give it credit for,” Haynes says. “I wanted the audience to fill in the holes themselves and make their own discoveries and feel like these ideas are alive again, because they’re coming through you, and they’re not just being told to us like in a lecture.” Haynes was nominated for the Critics' Choice Documentary Award for Best First Documentary Feature.

Haynes's latest film, May December, reunites him with frequent collaborator Julianne Moore and co-stars Natalie Portman and Charles Melton. The film, loosely based around Mary Kay Letourneau, revolves around a married couple whose relationship is put through a test after an actress arrives to do research for a film about their past. The script was written by Samy Burch, with a story by Burch and Alex Mechanik. The film was shot in Savannah, Georgia, and wrapped filming in December 2022. The film received positive reviews with Peter Debruge of Variety writing, "Todd Haynes unpacks America’s obsession with scandal and the impossibility of ever truly knowing what motivates others in this layered look at the actor’s process." The film went on to receive nominations for four Golden Globe Awards including Best Motion Picture – Musical or Comedy. Haynes himself was nominated for the Independent Spirit Award for Best Director.

In 2023, Todd Haynes was given a Moving Image Award by the Museum of the Moving Image (MOMI) in New York City. MOMI also curated a retrospective of his work, and published a book, Todd Haynes: Rapturous Process.

=== Upcoming projects ===
In 2015 he was reported to be developing a TV series based on the 2012 documentary The Source Family for HBO.

Haynes is set to direct a Peggy Lee biopic, titled Fever, based on a screenplay originally drafted by Nora Ephron before her death in 2012, starring Michelle Williams as Lee after Reese Witherspoon backed out of the role to produce instead. Billie Eilish is in early talks to executive produce. The primary screenwriter is now Doug Wright.

Haynes is reportedly set to direct the HBO series Trust, based on Hernan Diaz's novel of the same name, with Kate Winslet as the lead after working together on Mildred Pierce.

Haynes stated in September 2023 that he was working on a sexually explicit film about a "love story between two men set in the 1930's", starring Joaquin Phoenix. The project was cancelled shortly before production began when Phoenix abruptly quit. In August 2025, it was reported that the project is being revived with Pedro Pascal in the lead role instead, alongside Danny Ramirez. The film, titled De Noche, is scheduled to begin shooting in Guadalajara in March 2026, French film company MK2 Films will finance the production.

== Style and themes ==
AllMovie writes that "Haynes is known for making provocative films that subvert narrative structure and resound with transgressive, complex eroticism. ... Although he doesn't characterize himself as a gay filmmaker who makes gay films … Haynes' name has become synonymous with the New Queer Cinema movement and its work to both explore and redefine the contours of queer culture in America and beyond."

Haynes's work is preoccupied with postmodernist ideas of identity and sexuality as socially constructed concepts and personal identity as a fluid and changeable state. His protagonists are invariably social outsiders whose "subversive" identity and sexuality put them at odds with the received norms of their society. In the Haynes universe, sexuality (especially "deviant" or unconventional sexuality) is a subversive and dangerous force that disrupts social norms and is often repressed brutally by dominant power structures. Haynes presents artists as the ultimate subversive force since they must necessarily stand outside of societal norms, with an artist's creative output representing the greatest opportunity for personal and social freedom. Many of his films are unconventional portraits of popular artists and musicians (Karen Carpenter in Superstar, David Bowie in Velvet Goldmine and Bob Dylan in I'm Not There).

Haynes's films often feature formal cinematic or narrative devices that challenge received notions of identity and sexuality and remind the audience of the artificiality of film as a medium. Examples include using Barbie dolls instead of actors in Superstar or having multiple actors portray the protagonist in I'm Not There. Stylistically, Haynes favors formalism over naturalism, often appropriating and reinventing cinematic styles, including the documentary form in Poison, Velvet Goldmine and I'm Not There, the reinvention of the Douglas Sirk melodrama in Far from Heaven and extensive referencing of 1960s art cinema in I'm Not There.

== Personal life ==
Haynes is gay, and identifies as irreligious. After living in New York City for more than a decade, Haynes moved to Portland, Oregon, in 2002. He has been in a relationship with Bryan O'Keefe, an archival producer, since 2002.

An edited book of personal interviews was published in 2014, titled Todd Haynes: Interviews.

== Filmography ==
=== Feature films ===
Year	Title	Director	Writer	Notes
1991	Poison	Yes	Yes	
1995	Safe	Yes	Yes	
1998	Velvet Goldmine	Yes	Yes	
2002	Far from Heaven	Yes	Yes	
2007	I'm Not There	Yes	Yes	
2015	Carol	Yes	No	
2017	Wonderstruck	Yes	No	
2019	Dark Waters	Yes	No	
2021	The Velvet Underground	Yes	No	Also producer
2023	May December	Yes	No	
TBA	De Noche	Yes	Yes	In post-production

=== Short films ===
Year	Title	Director	Writer	Producer	Actor	Role
1978	The Suicide	Yes	Yes	No	No	
1985	Assassins: A Film Concerning Rimbaud	Yes	Yes	No	Yes	Himself
1987	Superstar: The Karen Carpenter Story	Yes	Yes	Yes	Yes	Todd Donovan, Disc Jockey
1989	La Divina	No	No	Yes	No	
1989	He Was Once	No	No	Yes	Yes	Randy

=== Executive producer ===
- Quinceañera (2006)
- Old Joy (2006)
- Wendy and Lucy (2008)
- Meek's Cutoff (2010)
- Buoy (2012)
- Night Moves (2013)
- Certain Women (2016)

=== Television ===
Year	Title	Director	Writer	Executive Producer	Notes
1993	Dottie Gets Spanked	Yes	Yes	No	TV short
2011	Mildred Pierce	Yes	Yes	Yes	Miniseries
2013	Enlightened	Yes	No	No	Episode: "All I Ever Wanted"
2013	Six by Sondheim	Yes	No	No	Segment: "I'm Still Here"

=== Commercials ===
Year	Title	Subject
2008	"Share the Good"	Heineken Premium Light

== Awards and nominations ==
Accolades for Haynes' feature films
Year	Title	Academy Awards		BAFTA Awards		Golden Globe Awards	
Year	Title	Nominations	Wins	Nominations	Wins	Nominations	Wins
1998	Velvet Goldmine	1		2	1		
2002	Far from Heaven	4				4	
2007	I'm Not There	1		1		1	1
2015	Carol	6		9		5	
2023	May December	1				4	
Total		13	0	12	1	14	1

Directed Academy Award performances

Year	Performer	Film	Result
Academy Award for Best Actress
2003	Julianne Moore	Far from Heaven	Nominated
2016	Cate Blanchett	Carol	Nominated
Academy Award for Best Supporting Actress
2008	Cate Blanchett	I'm Not There	Nominated
2016	Rooney Mara	Carol	Nominated

== See also ==
- List of LGBT people from Portland, Oregon
