= Jack Haven =

American actor (born 1994)

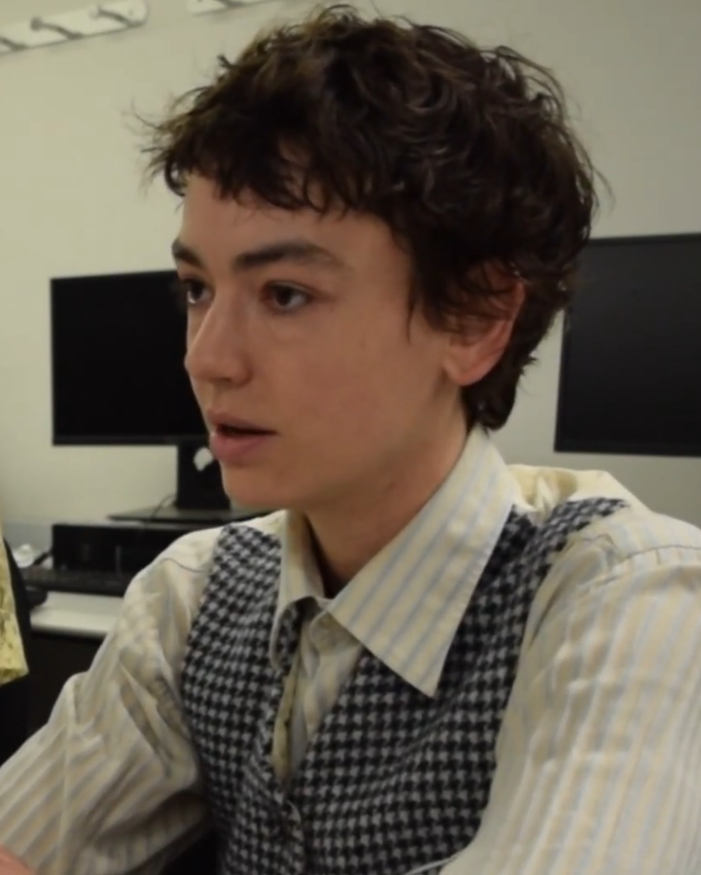
- Haven in 2024
- Born: August 10, 1994 (age 32); Dallas, Texas, U.S.
- Education: New York University (2015)
- Occupation: Actor
- Years active: 2015–present

Jack Haven (formerly Brigette Lundy-Paine; born August 10, 1994) is an American actor. They are known for playing Casey Gardner in the Netflix comedy-drama Atypical (2017–2021) and for their collaborations with filmmaker Jane Schoenbrun, portraying Maddy Wilson in the 2024 film I Saw the TV Glow and Little Death in Teenage Sex and Death at Camp Miasma.

== Early life and education ==
Born August 10, 1994, Jack Haven is the child of Laura Lundy and Robert Paine, who are both actors and directors, and has a younger brother. Their great-granduncle is songwriter Haven Gillespie. When Haven was two years old, their family moved to Alameda, California.

In 2012, they graduated from Encinal High School, where they were a cheerleader. They graduated from New York University in 2015.

== Career ==
Haven has been acting since they were 11; in 2017, they were cast as Casey Gardner on the television series Atypical. Haven also co-founded the improvisational vocal band Subtle Pride, as well as the art publication Waif Magazine, which they describe as an "absurdist fashion magazine."

Haven's directorial debut, October Crow, was released in 2024. The film, which stars Alexandra McVicker, Peter Nolan Smith, and Laura Lundy (Haven's mother), was shot on an iPhone X and almost completely improvised. It was edited by Haven using free software, including iMovie and Garage Band. October Crow won the Best Feature Film award at the 2026 Trans Image/Trans Experience Film Festival.

In 2025 and 2026, Haven hosted the UnCanney Film Festival while attending the Cannes Film Festival in Cannes, France.

In a June 2026 interview, Haven said they had recently finished editing their sophomore directorial project, a scripted film called Looking for Brookie, which also stars McVicker.

== Personal life ==
In 2019, Haven publicly came out as non-binary and began using they/them pronouns. They identify as queer. They have been involved in activism online, including for the Black Lives Matter movement.

In 2025, they went public with the name Jack Haven, posting on Instagram that they had started using it in a workshop for transgender actors run by Saman Arastoo two years prior.

== Filmography ==
=== Film ===
Year	Title	Role	Ref.
2015	Irrational Man	Braylin student	
2017	Downsizing	Dusan's girlfriend	
2017	The Glass Castle	Maureen Walls	
2017	The Wilde Wedding	Lara	
2018	Action Point	Four finger Annie	
2019	Bombshell	Julia Clarke	
2020	Bill & Ted Face the Music	Billie Logan	
2023	Amelia's Children	Riley	
2024	I Saw the TV Glow	Maddy Wilson	
2025	Love, Brooklyn	Riley	
2025	After This Death	Messenger	
2025	Queens of the Dead	Kelsey	
2025	Castration Movie Anthology ii. The Best of Both Worlds	Justice	
2026	Teenage Sex and Death at Camp Miasma	Little Death	
TBA	Grind	Ricky	

=== Television ===
Year	Title	Role	Notes	Ref.
2017–2021	Atypical	Casey Gardner	Main role	
2023	Bob's Burgers	Sage	Voice; episode: "These Boots Are Made for Stalking"	
