= De Noche (film) =

Upcoming film by Todd Haynes

- Directed by: Todd Haynes
- Written by: Todd Haynes; Jonathan Raymond
- Story by: Todd Haynes; Jonathan Raymond
- Produced by: Christine Vachon; Pamela Koffler
- Starring: Pedro Pascal; Danny Ramirez
- Edited by: Affonso Gonçalves
- Music by: Marcelo Zarvos
- Production companies: MK2 Films; Killer Films; IPR.VC; Paloma Negra Films
- Countries: France; Mexico; Finland; United States
- Language: English

De Noche is an upcoming romantic drama film directed by Todd Haynes and written by Haynes and Jonathan Raymond. It stars Pedro Pascal and Danny Ramirez.

== Premise ==
Two men in the 1930s fall in love and leave the United States for Mexico.

== Cast ==
- Pedro Pascal as Richard Rent
- Danny Ramirez as Joe Thomas

== Production ==
=== Development ===
In May 2023, Todd Haynes revealed that he had been developing a script with Joaquin Phoenix and Jon Raymond with Phoenix in the starring role; Haynes said that Phoenix was advising him to "go further" with the explicit material, which Haynes said would likely make it an NC-17 rated film. Haynes elaborated in September 2023 that the project was a sexually explicit "love story between two men set in the 1930's."

In July 2024, Danny Ramirez was cast to co-star opposite Phoenix. Speaking about the audition process, Ramirez said it "was extensive, and so what I walked away with that was just the artistic validation of throwing down opposite of [Joaquin] in this chemistry read… There was a moment that I was like, 'Oh, I've arrived as a performer.'" However, the project was cancelled days before filming began when Phoenix abruptly quit. Phoenix reportedly got "cold feet" according to a source close to the production; the production company lost over a million dollars as a result of the cancellation. Producer Christine Vachon confirmed that the allegations against Phoenix were true and wrote in a deleted social media post: "It has been a nightmare. If you are tempted to finger wag or admonish us that 'that's what you get for casting a straight actor' — DON'T. This was HIS project that he brought to US."

One year later, in August 2025, the project was revived, now titled De Noche, with Pedro Pascal replacing Phoenix.

=== Filming ===
Principal photography began in March 2026 in Sonora. Filming primarily occurred in Mexico City, which was chosen after the team initially considered Guadalajara prior to Phoenix's departure from the project. Filming wrapped by April 2026.
