= Danny Ramirez =

American actor (born 1992)

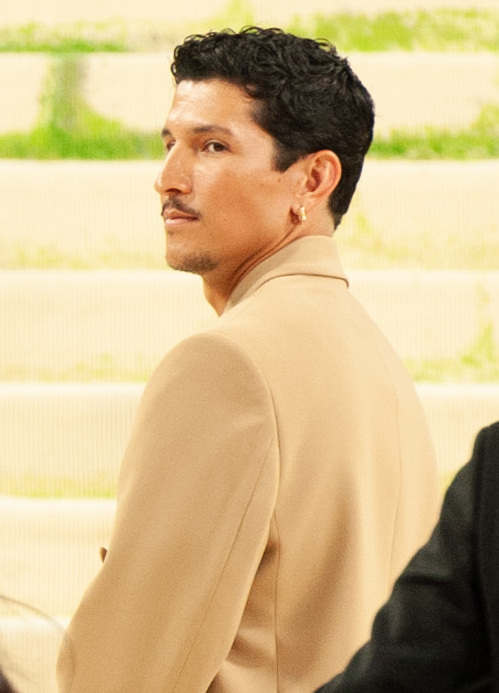
- Ramirez at the 2026 Met Gala
- Born: September 17, 1992 (age 34); Chicago, Illinois, U.S.
- Occupation: Actor
- Years active: 2016–present
- Height: 5 ft 9 in (175 cm)

Daniel Ramirez (born September 17, 1992) is an American actor. He gained recognition for his role as Joaquin Torres / Falcon in the Marvel Cinematic Universe (MCU) film Captain America: Brave New World (2025) and the Disney+ series The Falcon and the Winter Soldier (2021). He has also had roles in the film Top Gun: Maverick (2022), and the HBO television series The Last of Us (2025).

== Early life ==
Daniel Ramirez was born in Chicago, Illinois, and grew up in Miami, Florida. He is of Colombian and Mexican descent, attended Miami Coral Park Senior High School and initially wanted to be an athlete, trying out American football and soccer. He noted that after encountering injuries, he realized he needed a new career. He studied at New York University Tisch School of the Arts.

== Career ==
Ramirez made his screen and television debut on Showtime's The Affair (2016) as "Moving Van Kid #1", and NBC's Blindspot (2016) in another minor role. In 2017, he garnered some recognition for his recurring role as Wes on Fox's The Gifted (2017), and had a guest role in Orange Is the New Black (2017). From 2018 to 2019, he had a recurring role on Netflix's On My Block. In 2018, Ramirez graduated Tisch, and made his film debut in Sam Levinson's Assassination Nation which premiered at the Sundance Film Festival. He went on to have supporting roles in Tone-Deaf (2019), Lost Transmissions (2019), The Giant (2019), Silo (2019), This Is Not a War Story (2020) and Valley Girl (2020), a remake of the 1983 musical of the same name.

In August 2018, it was announced that Ramirez appear in Top Gun: Maverick alongside Tom Cruise, Glen Powell and Miles Teller, initially set for release in 2019. In November, Ramirez was honoured as the "Rising Star" at the Third Annual NYU Stonestreet Granite Awards, an award previously awarded to Teller and Rachel Brosnahan. Maverick received several delays and setbacks due to the COVID-19 pandemic, and was eventually released in May 27, 2022. The film received positive reviews and was nominated for the Academy Award for Best Picture.

In 2021, Ramirez portrayed Joaquin Torres in the Disney+ series The Falcon and the Winter Soldier (2021), set in the Marvel Cinematic Universe (MCU). Throughout 2022, Ramirez appeared in multiple films having lead roles in No Exit (2022), and Look Both Ways (2022), with the latter alongside Lili Reinhart. He also had a starring role in Stars at Noon (2022), and Root Letter (2022); the latter based on a Japanese video game. He later had supporting roles in Chestnut (2023), and Winner (2024). He also went on to appear in both anthology series Tales of the Walking Dead (2022), and Black Mirror (2023) in the respective episodes "La Doña" and "Mazey Day".

In early 2024, Ramirez launched a production company, Pinstripes with his longtime friend and collaborater, producer Tom Culliver, with the aim to tell "the stories no one else is, in a fashion you'll never forget". In February 2025, Ramirez reprised his role as Torres in the MCU film Captain America: Brave New World (2025) where the character takes on the mantle of Falcon from Anthony Mackie's Sam Wilson. In April 2025, Ramirez appeared as Manny in the second season of the HBO series The Last of Us after having been cast in March the year previously. Variety reported in 2025 that his role in the third season would be recast due to scheduling conflicts; a few months later, American actor Jorge Lendeborg Jr. was confirmed to be replacing him.

=== Upcoming projects ===
In December 2026, Ramirez will reprise his role of Falcon in the upcoming MCU film Avengers: Doomsday. He will also co-star in a biopic based on Jean-Michel Basquiat titled Samo Lives which wrapped production in October 2025. Ramirez is set to make his directorial debut with a Sports drama film titled Baton, produced by Victoria Alonso and David Beckham. The film began production in February 2026, and is set to star Ramirez alongside various cast members including Lewis Pullman, Camila Mendes and Becky G. In August 2026, Ramirez was cast in the crime film Miami Vice '85, set to be released in 2028. Later that year, he was cast in the horror film Violet which is set to start production in spring 2027.

In 2023, it was announced that Ramirez would star alongside American actor Joaquin Phoenix in De Noche, a "sexually explicit" love story between two men in the 1930s, set to be directed by Todd Haynes. A year later, five days before production began, Phoenix dropped out from the film abruptly. Ramirez called it a "complicated situation", and expressed his disappointment in the subsequent cancellation of the film. In August 2025, pre-production restarted on the film with actor Pedro Pascal in talks to replace Phoenix. Pascal was confirmed in February 2026 with production to begin in March.

Ramirez is set to star in an adaption of Scarface, producing the film with Tom Culliver through their production company Pinstripes, and will also star in a film titled The Juice opposite Lewis Pullman. Ramirez is also attached to star in a film that he wrote, Pursuit of Touch, produced alongside Jeremy O. Harris.

== Personal life ==
As of 2025, Ramirez has been in a relationship with American actress Jessica Alba.

== Filmography ==
Key
†	Denotes works that have not yet been released

=== Film ===
Year	Title	Role	Notes	Ref.
2018	Assassination Nation	Diamond		
2019	Tone-Deaf	Rodrigo		
2019	Lost Transmissions	Jake		
2019	The Giant	Brady		
2019	Silo	Daniel 'Lucha' Mendoza		
2020	This is Not a War Story	Timothy Reyes		
2020	Valley Girl	Chip		
2022	No Exit	Ash Garver		
2022	Top Gun: Maverick	Lieutenant Mickey "Fanboy" Garcia		
2022	Look Both Ways	Gabe		
2022	Stars at Noon	Costa Rican Policeman		
2022	Root Letter	Carlos Alvarez		
2023	Chestnut	Danny		
2024	Winner	Andre		
2025	Captain America: Brave New World	Joaquin Torres / Falcon		
2026	Baton †		Post-production; also director, producer, and writer	
2026	Avengers: Doomsday †	Joaquin Torres / Falcon	Post-production	
2028	Miami Vice '85 †		Filming	
TBA	Samo Lives †		Post-production	
TBA	De Noche †	Joe Thomas	Post-production	

=== Television ===
Year	Title	Role	Notes	Ref.
2016	The Affair	Moving Van Kid #1	1 episode	
2016	Blindspot	Panicked Student	Episode: "In the Comet of Us"	
2017	Orange Is The New Black	Paolo	Episode: "Tied to the Tracks"	
2017	The Gifted	Wes	3 episodes	
2018–2019	On My Block	Mario Martinez	4 episodes	
2021	The Falcon and the Winter Soldier	Joaquin Torres	5 episodes	
2022	Tales of the Walking Dead	Eric	Episode: "La Doña"	
2023	Black Mirror	Hector	Episode: "Mazey Day"	
2025	The Last of Us	Manny	4 episodes (season 2)	

=== Music videos ===
Year	Title	Role	Artist	Ref.
2022	"Great Balls of Fire"	Lieutenant Mickey "Fanboy" Garcia	Miles Teller	
2024	"Mercedes"	Himself	Becky G & Óscar Maydon	
2025	"Papasito"	Himself	Karol G	

== Accolades ==
Year	Award	Category	Work	Result	Ref.
2025	Astra TV Awards	Best Guest Actor in a Drama Series	The Last of Us	Nominated	
2025	Imagen Awards	Best Supporting Actor	Captain America: Brave New World	Nominated	
2019	Stonestreet Granite Awards	"Rising Star"	Himself	Honoree	
