= Louise Weard =

Canadian filmmaker (born 1994)

- Born: March 4, 1994 (age 32)
- Occupation: Filmmaker
- Years active: 2012–present
- Website: louiseweard.com

Louise Weard (born March 4, 1994) is a Canadian filmmaker best known for the Castration Movie anthology series.

== Early life and education ==
Weard was raised in Calgary and Saskatoon. She moved to Vancouver in 2012, where she attended the University of British Columbia.

== Career ==
In 2013, Weard released the short film Computer Hearts. She edited a compilation of onscreen "dick destruction" titled 100 Best Kills: Texas Birth Control, Dick Destruction for the 2022 Fantastic Fest.

Weard released Castration Movie Anthology i: Traps in 2024. The first installment in the Castration Movie series, the film consists of two segments titled “Chapter i: Incel Superman” and “Chapter ii: Traps Swan Princess". Castration Movie Anthology ii: The Best of Both Worlds, featuring the segment "Chapter iii. Polygon!!!! Heartmoder", was released in 2025. In 2026, Weard released Castration Movie Chapter iii.ii Junior Ghosts—Premorphic Drift; a fragmentary passage., which Weard initially pitched as an abridged version of Castration Movie Anthology iii. Year of the Hyaena as a means to get financing for post production; but it Weard decided to make it a standalone film after showing it at some film festivals. Castration Movie Anthology iii. Year of the Hyaena is expected to be completed for a 2026 release.

== Personal life ==
Weard is transgender.

== Filmography ==
Key
†	Denotes films that have not yet been released

Year	Title	Role	Notes
2014	Computer Hearts	Albert-Kun	Short film
2014	S.I.D.S.	The Patient	Short film
2017	Haxx Deadroom	—N/a	Short film Story Only; Directed by Dionne Copland
2022	100 Best Kills: Texas Birth Control, Dick Destruction	Self	Compilation film
2024	Castration Movie Anthology i. Traps	Michaela "Traps" Sinclair	—N/a
2025	Castration Movie Anthology ii: The Best of Both Worlds	—N/a	—N/a
2025	The Serpent's Skin	—N/a	Producer Only; Directed by Alice Maio Mackay
2026	Castration Movie Chapter iii. Junior Ghosts—Premorphic Drift; a fragmentary passage	Michaela "Traps" Sinclair	—N/a
2026	EE	—N/a	Short Film; Producer Only; Directed by Heather Landsman
2026	Teenage Sex and Death at Camp Miasma	Queer Assistant	Actress Only; Directed by Jane Schoenbrun
TBA	Castration Movie Anthology iii: Year of the Hyaena †	Michaela "Traps" Sinclair	—N/a
TBA	Castration Movie Anthology iv †	Michaela "Traps" Sinclair	—N/a
TBA	Castration Movie Anthology v †	Michaela "Traps" Sinclair	—N/a
