= Silo (film) =

- Film poster
- Directed by: Marshall Burnette
- Written by: Marshall Burnette; Jason Williamson
- Starring: Jim Parrack; Jill Paice; Jack DiFalco; Jeremy Holm; Danny Ramirez; Chris Ellis
- Release dates: October 12, 2019 (Louisville); May 7, 2021
- Running time: 76 minutes
- Country: United States
- Language: English

Silo is a 2019 American thriller drama film directed by Marshall Burnette and starring Jim Parrack, Jill Paice, Jack DiFalco, Jeremy Holm, Danny Ramirez and Chris Ellis. The film premiered at the 2019 Louisville's International Festival of Film.

== Plot summary ==
In a small farming town, Cody, a local teen and aspiring musician, becomes trapped in a 50-foot grain silo. Volunteer Fire Chief Frank and the farms owner, Junior work to save him before he dies. Along the way they and the rest of the community must overcome their differences.

== Cast ==
- Jeremy Holm as Frank
- Jill Paice as Valerie
- Jack DiFalco as Cody
- Jim Parrack as Junior
- Chris Ellis as Mr. Adler
- Danny Ramirez as Lucha
- James DeForest Parker as Sutter
- Rebecca Lines as Sheriff Jessica Baxter

== Release ==
The film was released on May 7, 2021.

== Reception ==
The film has a 62 percent rating on Rotten Tomatoes based on 21 reviews.

Glenn Kenny of RogerEbert.com awarded the film two stars out of four and wrote, "The shooting is picturesque, the acting overbaked."

Jacob Oller of Paste rated the film a 4.1 and wrote, "There’s a very scary, thrilling, insightful movie to be made about these kinds of accidents and the people they happen to. Silo isn’t it."

Brian Shaer of Film Threat rated the film a 9.5 out of 10 and wrote, "But rest assured that soon enough, this small, unassuming film reveals its true nature as one of the scariest movies I’ve seen in a long time."
