= Castration Movie =

2024-2026 film

- Directed by: Louise Weard
- Written by: Louise Weard
- Starring: Louise Weard; Lex Walton; Aoife Josie Clements; Vera Drew; Noah Baker; Alice Maio Mackay; Cricket Arrison; Magda Baker; Jasmine Provins; Nathan Doll; Cameron Peterson; John Paizs; Ivy Wolk; Jane Schoenbrun; Jack Haven; Theda Hammel; Betsey Brown; Peter Kuplowsky; Peter Vack; Avalon Fast; Henri Gillespie
- Cinematography: Dakota Blais; Aoife Josie Clements; Avalon Fast; Joshua Gratton; Jasmine Provins; Louise Weard; Elizabeth Purchell
- Edited by: Louise Weard
- Music by: Aoife Josie Clements
- Production company: Hentai Cop Films
- Distributed by: Muscle Distribution (United States); Matchbox Cine (Europe); Static Vision (Australia)
- Release dates: June 5, 2024 (i. Traps); September 1, 2025 (ii. The Best of Both Worlds); March 22, 2026 (iii. Junior Ghosts—Premorphic Drift)
- Running time: 274 minutes (i. Traps); 300 minutes (ii. The Best of Both Worlds); 127 minutes (iii.ii Junior Ghosts—Premorphic Drift)
- Country: Canada
- Language: English

Castration Movie is an ongoing drama film series written and directed by Louise Weard. The first volume Castration Movie Anthology i. Traps released in June 2024, and the second volume, Castration Movie Anthology ii. The Best of Both Worlds released in September 2025. The third volume, Castration Movie Chapter iii. Junior Ghosts—Premorphic Drift; a fragmentary passage, premiered in July 2026.

== Synopsis ==
=== "Castration Movie Anthology i. Traps" ===
==== "Chapter i. Incel Superman" ====
Turner, a production assistant, and Brooklyn, a freelance artist, are having struggles in their relationship. The two get into arguments over date plans, sex, and Turner's public behavior.

In a scene that is characteristic of their relationship, Turner reads posts aloud from 4chan's incel board while Brooklyn works on a furry porn commission. Turner remembers that the two have plans to go out with their friends Izzy and Trent, surprising Brooklyn. The double date, poorly planned, irritates her. On a later date night, Brooklyn breaks up with Turner, who quickly gets upset. The two argue, escalating until Brooklyn demands that Turner stays away from her.

At his job, Turner frequently pitches his film ideas to higher-ups and actors. They all relate to pop culture artifacts like Superman, Harry Potter, and Star Wars. After his breakup, Turner's hours are cut due to his unprofessional behavior. He tells his supervisor off, and is fired. Turner explodes at his supervisor, insisting his creative superiority. He continues to rant after his supervisor has left.

Turner, falling deeper into incel rhetoric, has trouble dating. After a particularly bad date, Turner starts day drinking. Growing desperate, he tries to get in contact with Brooklyn. He first tries to visit her work and then breaks into her apartment. Brooklyn, in the middle of a lesbian hookup, is horrified and argues with Turner until she forces him to leave.

At home, Turner cries, masturbates, and writes a post on 4chan.

==== "Chapter ii. Traps Swan Princess" ====
Michaela "Traps" Sinclair is a trans woman living as a sex worker in Vancouver, Canada. She splits her days between making self-promotional sexual content and hanging out with her group of other transgender friends.

Michaela serves as a mentor for her friend Adeline who is anxious about her job after recently coming out and convinces Michaela to train her to make a career through sex work. During this time, Adeline also performs music with her T4T boyfriend Rocco while he is going through the process of top surgery. Adeline and Michaela's relationship grows increasingly strained despite their deep bond with each other as Michaela's more hard-line notions of transgender womanhood clash with Adeline's growing doubts based on the unique stressors involved in her life.

Wanting to become a mother and advance her relationship with her increasingly distant chaser boyfriend Christian, Michaela decides to temporarily medically detransition for 3 months in order to attempt sperm donation through a fertility clinic. Michaela attempts to invite Christian to meet her friends and attend her brother's wedding, but he declines and comes up with excuses every time.

Upon attempting to restart her medical transition, Michaela visits Persephone, her polyamorous grey-market HRT dealer and discovers her estrogen supply has been disrupted due to the Russo-Ukrainian war. Learning that her fertility results were not viable & increasingly fearing that her boyfriend is ghosting her, she shows up at his apartment unannounced and convinces him to spend one more night with her before officially breaking up.

=== "Castration Movie Anthology ii. The Best of Both Worlds" ===
==== "Chapter iii. Polygon!!!! Heartmoder" ====
In New York City, protagonist Circle lives in a trans woman separatist cult called "Polygon", but is having second thoughts about her gender identity and commitment to the group. The cult has constant ketamine-fueled orgies, has an ideological stance influenced by the /lgbt/ board on 4chan, uses predatory online recruitment tactics facilitated by an AI chatbot that serves as the cult's oracle, and the members live on a diet of only hot dogs. Groupthink takes precedence over there being any single leader, and the members are ideologically captured to varying degrees.

In the second act, Circle escapes into the Bushwick night. After a falling out with her salacious former roommate from before joining the cult, she gets swept up by a visiting Canadian woman, and ends up at a party and then an after-party. During the course of the night, she encounters a number of cisgender characters who provide dissenting perspectives on Circle's living situation and transgender status, including Keller (Ivy Wolk), a crass "ex-nonbinary" woman who suggests that Circle should detransition. After hints of a budding relationship with Keller, Circle decides to leave Polygon behind, although she decides to return to the cult's residence briefly to gather her belongings. Upon returning, she is initially told she is allowed to leave after signing an non-disclosure agreement, but after signing she is attacked and forced to strip naked before getting into a dog cage. The members of Polygon ritually abuse and degrade her, before ultimately telling her to commit suicide with a handgun. However, Keller arrives in time to save her, having learned about the cult from a friend, and the cult splinters as various members become disillusioned and leave. Having decided to detransition and live as a man, Circle gets a haircut from Keller, and the two depart Brooklyn together.

=== "Chapter iii. Junior Ghosts—Premorphic Drift; a fragmentary passage" ===
Back in Vancouver, Izzy is cursed by the victim of a support group mass murder and her partner comes out as a transgender woman.

=== "Castration Movie ⅗ Year of the Hyaena" ===
==== "Interregnum" ====
Adeline and Traps do a job together.

==== "Chapter iii. Chastity No Exit Virtue Cuck" ====
Michaela tries to be a good person.

== Cast ==
- Louise Weard as Michaela "Traps" Sinclair
- Noah Baker as Turner Stewart
- Aoife Josie Clements as Adeline
- Magda Baker as Rocco
- Cameron Peterson as Christian
- Vera Drew as Persephone
- Cricket Arrison as Other Michaela
- Alice Maio Mackay as Alyssa
- Avalon Fast as Izzy
- Henri Gillepsi as Trent / Tiffany
- Lea Rose Sebastianis as Natalie
- John Paizs as Dr. Stewart
- Jasmine Provins as Brooklyn
- Nate Wilson as Reginald
- Dakota Blais as Bronwyn
- Penny Andrews as Taylor
- Lex Walton as Circle
- Ivy Wolk as Keller
- Hesse Deni as Roxie
- Ada Rook as Sora
- Jane Schoenbrun as Kane
- Jack Haven as Justice
- Theda Hammel as Felicity
- Betsey Brown as Casper
- Peter Kuplowsky as Hotel John
- Peter Vack as Brody
- Felix Biederman and Will Menaker as Stoop Guys

== Production ==
In 2023, Weard launched a Kickstarter crowdfunding campaign for the movie under the name Untitled Louise Weard Castration Movie. It was pitched as a remake of her short film S.I.D.S. The first volume of the film, titled Castration Movie Anthology i. Traps, premiered on June 5, 2024. In 2025, crowdfunding began for the second volume, Castration Movie Anthology ii. The Best of Both Worlds. The second volume of Castration Movie premiered on September 1, 2025.

Weard stated that in making the film, she wanted to "deliver a trans story by us, for us, and about us."

The films were shot using a Hi8 camcorder, with only one take per scene. Weard "would regularly hand the Hi8 camcorder to crew members with the least shooting experience," due to a desire for "weightlessness of form" and a "level of realism".

== Reception ==
The first volume of Castration Movie spread via word of mouth. Weard's performance as Traps in volume one was named one of the 25 best performances of 2024 by TheWrap, with critic William Bibbiani calling the film "daring and revolutionary". Writing for Autostraddle, writer and filmmaker Drew Burnett Gregory praised the film for its nuanced handling of trans topics.

At the 30th Fantasia International Film Festival, Junior Ghosts—Premorphic Drift won the Silver Audience Award for Canadian films.
