= I Saw the TV Glow =

2024 film by Jane Schoenbrun

- Theatrical release poster
- Directed by: Jane Schoenbrun
- Written by: Jane Schoenbrun
- Produced by: Sam Intili; Sarah Winshall; Emma Stone; Dave McCary; Ali Herting
- Starring: Justice Smith; Jack Haven (Note: Credited as Brigette Lundy-Paine); Helena Howard; Lindsey Jordan; Conner O'Malley; Emma Portner; Ian Foreman; Fred Durst; Danielle Deadwyler
- Cinematography: Eric K. Yue
- Edited by: Sofi Marshall
- Music by: Alex G
- Production companies: Fruit Tree; Smudge Films; Hypnic Jerk
- Distributed by: A24
- Release dates: January 18, 2024 (Sundance); May 3, 2024 (United States)
- Running time: 100 minutes
- Country: United States
- Language: English
- Budget: $10 million
- Box office: $5.4 million

I Saw the TV Glow is a 2024 American psychological horror drama film written and directed by Jane Schoenbrun. The film stars Justice Smith and Jack Haven as two troubled high school students whose connection to their favorite television show drives them to question their reality and identities. The supporting cast includes Helena Howard, Lindsey Jordan, Conner O'Malley, Emma Portner, Ian Foreman, Fred Durst, and Danielle Deadwyler.

Actress Emma Stone and her husband, comedian Dave McCary, are among the film's producers under their Fruit Tree company. The film premiered at the Sundance Film Festival on January 18, 2024. It was given a limited theatrical release by A24 in the United States on May 3, with its theatrical release expanding to Canada and nationwide in the US on May 17. I Saw the TV Glow received positive reviews from critics and received five nominations at the 40th Independent Spirit Awards, including Best Feature.

The film marks the second entry in what Schoenbrun refers to as their Screen Trilogy, following the film We're All Going to the World's Fair (2021) and preceding their novel Public Access Afterworld.

== Plot ==
In 1996, isolated teenagers Owen and Maddy bond over the young adult television show The Pink Opaque, which follows teenagers Isabel and Tara as they use their psychic connection to fight supervillain Mr. Melancholy, who has the power to warp time and reality. Due to the show airing past his bedtime and his father's disapproval of him watching it, Owen sneaks out to Maddy's house to watch it with her; she also provides him with tapes of the show when he misses it. Maddy feels deeply connected to The Pink Opaque, claiming that it feels more real to her than her actual life. Two years later, while watching The Pink Opaque with Owen, Maddy begins sobbing inexplicably, later explaining that she has resolved to run away. She expects Owen to join her, but he finds himself unable to go through with it and stays behind. Later, Maddy goes missing, Owen's mother Brenda dies of cancer, and The Pink Opaque is canceled after five seasons.

In 2006, Owen still lives with his father, Frank, and works at a local movie theater. Maddy suddenly reappears one night and takes Owen to a bar where it's "safe" for them to talk. She rebuffs Owen's pleas for her to contact the police, instead questioning what Owen remembers of The Pink Opaque and claiming to have spent the past two years inside the show itself. At her urging, Owen rewatches the final episode, in which Mr. Melancholy captures Isabel and Tara and imprisons their consciousnesses in a pocket universe known as the "Midnight Realm" which bears a strong resemblance to the real world. Mr. Melancholy's minions then bury Isabel and Tara alive before the episode abruptly ends. After finishing the episode, Owen suffers a nervous breakdown and attempts to stick his head through the TV screen before Frank pulls him out.

The next night, Maddy explains to Owen that, after running away, she continued to feel unsatisfied and paid a man to bury her alive; after suffocating, she awoke in The Pink Opaque as Tara. She explains that they are in fact in the Midnight Realm and that their true identities are those of Tara and Isabel, respectively; the memories of their actual lives have manifested as episodes of a TV show. Maddy then encourages Owen to allow her to bury him alive so that they may return to their reality. She leads Owen to a football field to be buried, but at the last minute, he panics, pushes her away, and rushes home. While Owen never sees her again, he remains haunted by her claims.

By 2010, Owen is living alone after Frank's death from a stroke, though he claims to have started his own family. One night, he rewatches The Pink Opaque on a streaming service, but finds it to be more fatuous, saccharine, and juvenile than he remembered. Over the next twenty years, Owen's depression and asthma increasingly worsen. After the movie theater he works for closes down, his supervisor secures him a job at a family entertainment center.

During a child's birthday party, a now middle-aged Owen begins abruptly screaming that he is "dying" and begs for help, though nobody reacts, appearing instead to freeze in place as Owen cries out. Owen locks himself in the bathroom and cuts his chest open with a box cutter, smiling when he sees a TV screen inside. He returns to work and timidly offers apologies to partygoers for his outburst.

== Cast ==
- Justice Smith as Owen
  - Ian Foreman as younger Owen
- Jack Haven as Maddy Wilson
- Helena Howard as Isabel
- Lindsey Jordan as Tara
- Danielle Deadwyler as Brenda
- Fred Durst as Frank
- Conner O'Malley as Dave
- Emma Portner as Mr. Melancholy / Marco / Amanda / Evil Clown
- Madaline Riley as Polo
- Amber Benson as Johnny Link's mom
- Michael C. Maronna as neighbor #1
- Danny Tamberelli as neighbor #2

Appearing as themselves in the film are Phoebe Bridgers, Haley Dahl and their band Sloppy Jane, as well as Kristina Esfandiari and her band King Woman.

== Production ==
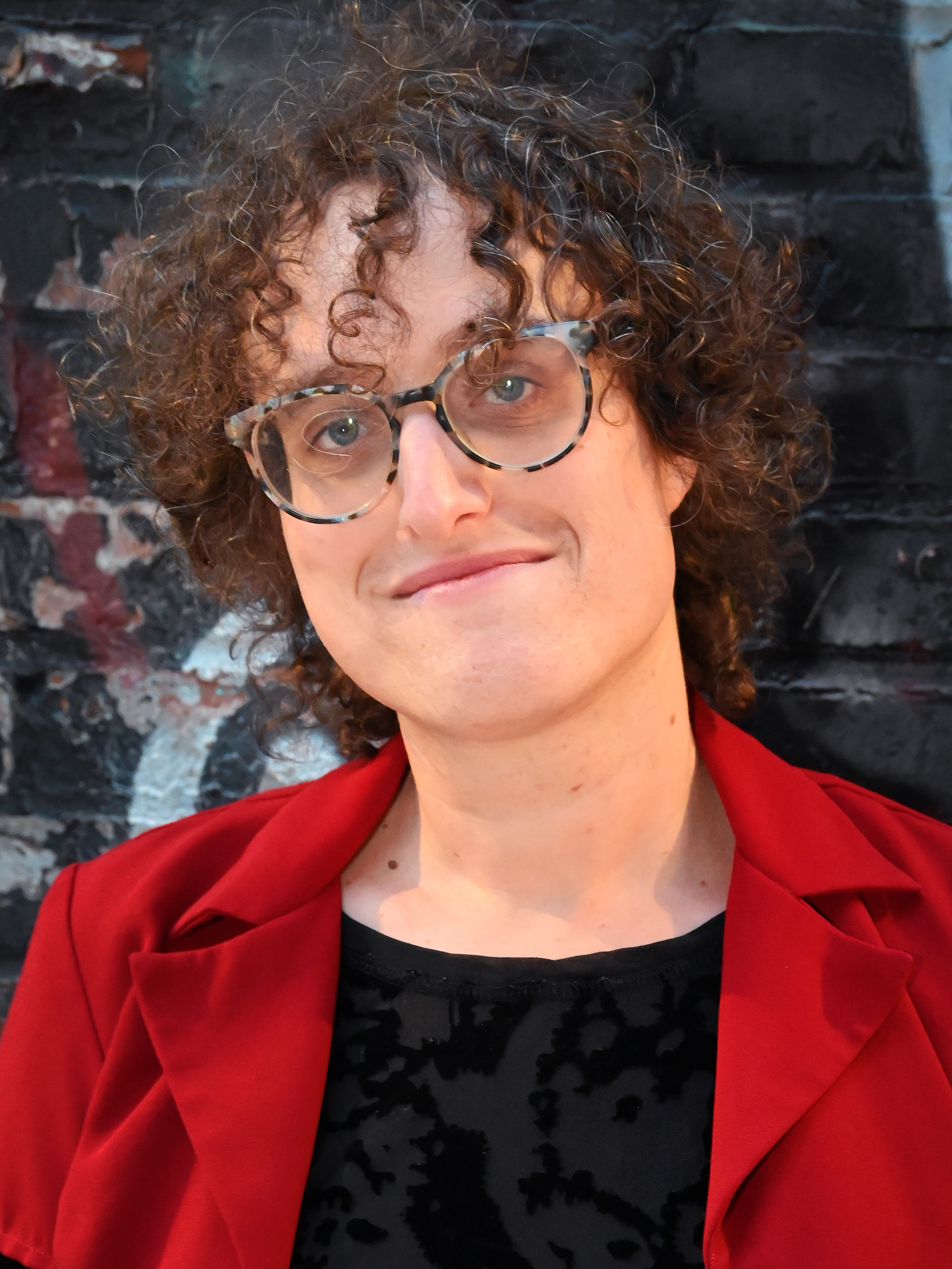
Writer-director Jane Schoenbrun in 2025

Schoenbrun began work on the script for I Saw the TV Glow three months after they had begun undergoing hormone replacement therapy, amid what they described as "overwhelming calamity" following having come out as transgender. In featuring the transgender themes, Schoenbrun deliberately avoided making transitioning or coming out explicitly central to the plot, opting instead to write the story as an allegory so as to distinguish it from other films on the topic.

In 2021, the script caught the attention of Emma Stone and her husband Dave McCary, who Schoenbrun said "fell in love with the script immediately." The script was shopped around to six potential production partners. In October 2021, the film was announced as an A24 production with Schoenbrun directing, while Stone and McCary would produce under their Fruit Tree banner. In August 2022, it was announced Justice Smith, Jack Haven, Helena Howard, Danielle Deadwyler, Amber Benson, Ian Foreman, Conner O'Malley, Emma Portner, Danny Tamberelli, Phoebe Bridgers, Lindsey Jordan, Fred Durst, Haley Dahl, and Kristina Esfandiari had joined the cast.

Principal photography took place in New Jersey from July to August 2022. Shooting took place at Verona High School, Cedar Grove High School, and Keansburg Amusement Park. Other locations were the music venue The Saint and Camp Lewis. The Pink Opaque segments were shot on 35mm film but later transferred to VHS and Betamax in post-production.

== Themes ==
Jack Haven cited I Saw the TV Glow as an allegory for being transgender. Schoenbrun has frequently described the film as being about the "egg crack", a term for the moment in a transgender person's life upon realizing that their identity does not correspond to their assigned sex, and said Owen's choice to not bury himself alive with Maddy and ultimate existential crisis was illustrative of their personal fears of potentially living out their life without having transitioned. In a June 2024 profile of themself published in The New Yorker, Schoenbrun discussed how their relationship with their family had influenced the film's story, saying:

TV Glow is about something I think a lot of trans people understand. [...] The tension between the space that you exist within, which feels like home, and the simultaneous terror and liberation of understanding that that space might not be able to hold you in your true form. [...] I think many people, even if they are sympathetic to narratives of biological-family estrangement, still want to believe in resolution or restorative reparative work. And I think this does a disservice to queer people who are not in control of whether that work can be done.

I Saw the TV Glow is heavily influenced by and draws parallels to Buffy the Vampire Slayer (1997–2003). This is reflected in the film's fictional TV show The Pink Opaque, which mirrors Buffy through its strong female leads and a mix of mythic and monster-of-the-week episodes. Owen is introduced to this "Buffy-esque" show that becomes a refuge for him until its narrative starts affecting his reality as the story explores loneliness and the search for something real through a fixation. The cameo by Benson, who played lesbian character Tara Maclay on Buffy, "felt healing in a way" for Schoenbrun, who relied on the show as a coping mechanism during adolescence.

The film has been compared to The Adventures of Pete & Pete (1991–1996), exploring the theme of children living in a "semi-magical, frequently scary" world unnoticed by adults. Maronna and Tamberelli, lead actors of Pete & Pete, appear as ghostly neighbors to explore the uncanny nature of aging. Schoenbrun emphasized that the cameos are meant to deepen the film's ideas.

According to The AV Club, Owen's story demonstrates "what happens to a trans person when the world makes the prospect of transitioning too terrifying to ever look at straight-on". Owen and Maddy represent pre- and post-realization stages of identity, mirroring Schoenbrun's own journey of self-discovery. It delves into how people perceive media differently as they grow, with changes in tone reflecting shifts in understanding, and feelings of shame and dysphoria. Owen experiences a sense of claustrophobia and disconnection from reality, mirroring the struggle to retain one's sense of wonder and magic in the face of adulthood. The film ends with Owen when the "world is content to ignore his screams that something inside of him is dying", and highlights the importance of "a little magic, borrowed from art, is one of the only ways to survive, and to remind yourself that—as the film's most haunting line reminds us—there is still time".

The film also draws inspiration from Schoenbrun's recurring dream about the ending of Twin Peaks (1990–1991) and aims to capture a "Lynchian terror". Inspired by its followup Twin Peaks: The Return (2017), the film intertwines themes of TV series endings and revivals.

The visual aesthetics were inspired by what Schoenbrun considered "to be the most beautiful films" (A.I.: Artificial Intelligence, Blade Runner, "a lot of animation" and ones that "felt like they had the audacity to paint in really vibrant, rich and heightened colors").

== Music ==
The film's original score was composed by Alex G. The film features an original soundtrack that includes songs from Caroline Polachek, Sloppy Jane, Phoebe Bridgers, Kristina Esfandiari, Florist, yeule, Drab Majesty, Snail Mail, among others. The soundtrack was released on May 10, 2024, followed by Alex G's score, which was released on May 16, 2024.

== Release ==
I Saw the TV Glow premiered in the Midnight section at the 2024 Sundance Film Festival on January 18, 2024. It also screened at the 74th Berlin International Film Festival in the Panorama section on February 20, 2024, and South by Southwest on March 10, 2024.

The film was released in select theaters in the United States on May 3, 2024 (playing in New York City and Los Angeles), with its release expanding nationwide and to Canada on May 17. It was made available digitally in June 2024. It was theatrically released internationally by Stage 6 Films, including Australia and New Zealand on August 29, 2024, with Park Circus Films codistributing the film in the United Kingdom and Ireland, where it was released on July 26.

== Reception ==
=== Critical response ===
On the review aggregator website Rotten Tomatoes, the film holds an approval rating of 85% based on 236 reviews, with an average rating of 7.6/10. The website's critics consensus reads, "With a distinctive visual aesthetic that enhances its emotionally resonant narrative, I Saw the TV Glow further establishes writer-director Jane Schoenbrun as a rising talent." On Metacritic, which uses a weighted average, the film has a score of 86 out of 100, based on 48 critics, indicating "universal acclaim".

To Guy Lodge of Variety, TV Glow is "both promising psychodrama fodder on its own terms, and of a piece with the particular fixations Schoenbrun has established across their small oeuvre thus far". David Ehrlich of IndieWire wrote, "Schoenbrun's astonishing second feature manages to retain the seductive fear of their micro-budget debut and deepen its thrilling wounds of discovery even while examining them at a much larger scale". Some reviewers also praised the film for the authenticity with which it conveyed transgender themes, with Richard Brody of The New Yorker calling it "a profound vision of the trans experience", and Veronica Esposito for The Guardian saying it "speaks to '90s trans teens".

Amy Nicholson of the Los Angeles Times criticized the film as a "collection of leaden scenes that might make the audience want to claw out of its own skin", noting that it "invents a new emotion: passionate ambivalence". Nicolas Rapold of Sight and Sound agreed, writing that "there's the awed sense of a blueprint or roadmap that is insisted upon without entirely being executed and fulfilled". Dylan Roth of the Observer acknowledged this discomfort, noting that the "challenge with I Saw the TV Glow is that almost everything I disliked about it is done on purpose, and effectively. As a piece of art, I can't deny that it works".

Filmmaker Martin Scorsese praised the film as "emotionally and psychologically powerful" and said that he liked it "a great deal". After viewing the film, Paul Schrader called Schoenbrun "hands down the most original voice in film in the last decade," but "also confounding." Other filmmakers, including Lena Dunham, Drew Hancock and Pascal Plante also praised the film.

Sight and Sound put the film at 11 on their list of the best 50 movies of 2024. In June 2025, IndieWire ranked the film at number 28 on its list of "The 100 Best Movies of the 2020s (So Far)."

=== Accolades ===
Award	Date of ceremony	Category	Recipient(s)	Result	Ref.
Astra Midseason Movie Awards	July 3, 2024	Best Picture	I Saw the TV Glow	Nominated	
Astra Midseason Movie Awards	July 3, 2024	Best Actor	Justice Smith	Nominated	
Astra Midseason Movie Awards	July 3, 2024	Best Supporting Actor	Jack Haven	Nominated	
Astra Midseason Movie Awards	July 3, 2024	Best Screenplay	Jane Schoenbrun	Nominated	
Astra Midseason Movie Awards	July 3, 2024	Best Indie	I Saw the TV Glow	Nominated	
Champs-Élysées Film Festival	June 26, 2024	Audience Award for Best American Independent Feature	I Saw the TV Glow	Won	
Neuchâtel International Fantastic Film Festival	July 13, 2024	Imaging The Future best production design	I Saw the TV Glow	Won	
Fangoria Chainsaw Awards	October 2024	Best Limited Release	I Saw the TV Glow	Won	
Fangoria Chainsaw Awards	October 2024	Best Supporting Performance	Jack Haven	Nominated	
Fangoria Chainsaw Awards	October 2024	Best Cinematography	Eric K. Yue	Nominated	
Fangoria Chainsaw Awards	October 2024	Best Score	Alex G	Nominated	
Gotham Awards	December 2, 2024	Best Director	Jane Schoenbrun	Nominated	
Gotham Awards	December 2, 2024	Outstanding Lead Performance	Justice Smith	Nominated	
Gotham Awards	December 2, 2024	Outstanding Supporting Performance	Jack Haven	Nominated	
Chicago Film Critics Association	December 12, 2024	Best Film	I Saw the TV Glow	Nominated	
Chicago Film Critics Association	December 12, 2024	Best Director	Jane Schoenbrun	Nominated	
Chicago Film Critics Association	December 12, 2024	Most Promising Performer	Jack Haven	Nominated	
Florida Film Critics Circle	December 20, 2024	Best Original Screenplay	Jane Schoenbrun	Won	
Florida Film Critics Circle	December 20, 2024	Breakout Performance	Jack Haven	Nominated	
Black Reel Awards	February 10, 2025	Outstanding Independent Film	Jane Schoenbrun	Nominated	
Independent Spirit Awards	February 22, 2025	Best Feature	Ali Herting, Sam Intili, Dave McCary, Emma Stone and Sarah Winshall	Nominated	
Independent Spirit Awards	February 22, 2025	Best Director	Jane Schoenbrun	Nominated	
Independent Spirit Awards	February 22, 2025	Best Screenplay	Jane Schoenbrun	Nominated	
Independent Spirit Awards	February 22, 2025	Best Lead Performance	Justice Smith	Nominated	
Independent Spirit Awards	February 22, 2025	Best Supporting Performance	Jack Haven	Nominated	
Seattle International Film Festival	May 19, 2024	Seattle Film Critics Society Feature Film Award	I Saw the TV Glow	Won	
Seattle Film Critics Society	December 16, 2024	Best Picture	I Saw the TV Glow	Nominated	
St. Louis Film Critics Association	December 15, 2024	Best Horror Film	I Saw the TV Glow	Nominated	
St. Louis Film Critics Association	December 15, 2024	Best Soundtrack	I Saw the TV Glow	Nominated	
Dorian Awards	2025	Film of the Year	I Saw the TV Glow	Nominated	
Dorian Awards	2025	LGBTQ Film of the Year	I Saw the TV Glow	Won	
Dorian Awards	2025	Director of the Year	Jane Schoenbrun	Nominated	
Dorian Awards	2025	Screenplay of the Year	Jane Schoenbrun	Nominated	
Dorian Awards	2025	LGBTQ Screenplay of the Year	Jane Schoenbrun	Won	
Dorian Awards	2025	Film Performance of the Year	Justice Smith	Nominated	
Dorian Awards	2025	Supporting Film Performance of the Year	Jack Haven	Nominated	
Dorian Awards	2025	Genre Film of the Year	I Saw the TV Glow	Nominated	
Dorian Awards	2025	Film Music of the Year	Alex G	Nominated	
Critics' Choice Super Awards	August 7, 2025	Best Actor in a Horror Movie	Justice Smith	Nominated	

== Potential sequel ==
In May 2024, in an interview with USA Today, Schoenbrun stated that a sequel to I Saw the TV Glow was possible, saying that they would be open to approaching the story from a different perspective. In September 2024, Schoenbrun made a post to X (formerly Twitter), in which they mentioned having an idea for a sequel to I Saw the TV Glow that they want to make "in a few years". In an August 2026 interview with Douglas Greenwood, Schoenbrun further reaffirmed their intention to make a sequel to I Saw the TV Glow, stating that they have an idea "meaty" and relevant enough to warrant the large amount of time that would be spent to create the film.
