= We're All Going to the World's Fair =

2021 film by Jane Schoenbrun

- Theatrical release poster
- Directed by: Jane Schoenbrun
- Written by: Jane Schoenbrun
- Produced by: Sarah Winshall; Carlos Zozaya
- Starring: Anna Cobb; Michael J. Rogers
- Cinematography: Daniel Patrick Carbone
- Edited by: Jane Schoenbrun
- Music by: Alex G
- Production companies: Dweck Productions; Flies Collective
- Distributed by: Utopia
- Release dates: January 31, 2021 (Sundance); April 15, 2022 (United States)
- Running time: 86 minutes
- Country: United States
- Language: English
- Box office: $106,644

We're All Going to the World's Fair is a 2021 American coming-of-age psychological horror film written, directed, and edited by Jane Schoenbrun in their narrative feature directorial debut. The film stars Anna Cobb (in her feature film debut) and Michael J. Rogers. David Lowery served as an executive producer. The film follows Casey (Cobb), a teenage girl who takes the "World's Fair Challenge" and documents the mental and physical changes that it causes her.

The film had its world premiere at the Sundance Film Festival on January 31, 2021. It was released theatrically in the United States by Utopia on April 15, 2022, and began streaming on HBO Max on September 1, 2022. It received positive reviews from critics and grossed over $100,000 at the box office.

The film is the first entry in Schoenbrun's Screen Trilogy, and was followed by I Saw the TV Glow (2024) and book Public Access Afterworld (2026).

== Plot ==
Casey, a lonely teenage girl living with her single father, records herself taking the viral "World's Fair Challenge". She states "I want to go to the World's Fair" three times, pricks her finger, smears her blood on her laptop computer screen, and watches a strobe light video, before saying she will post updates if she starts to notice any "changes" and posts the video publicly.

Other World's Fair challengers record and post their own psychological and physical changes while engaging with viewers. In a video, Casey recounts bouts of sleepwalking she experienced when she was younger and says she has felt similarly since taking the challenge. Late one night, she sneaks into her shed and finds her father's assault rifle. She watches an ASMR video of a young woman calming someone after a nightmare, before a video addressed to her by user "JLB" plays, featuring Casey's distorted face and the messages "YOU ARE IN TROUBLE" and "I NEED TO TALK TO YOU."

Casey reaches out to JLB, a collaborator with other World's Fair challengers, and speaks with him over Skype, though he keeps his camera off. JLB claims to worry about the symptoms she has reported, and encourages her to keep making videos so he can monitor her well-being. JLB is revealed to be an equally lonely middle-aged man who spends his time watching other people's World's Fair videos.

JLB watches a video Casey recorded of herself sleeping, during which she pulls herself out of bed with a menacing smile. JLB informs her that the forces behind the World's Fair are taking her over, and that she should continue posting. The content of Casey's videos becomes increasingly disturbing. She inexplicably screams in terror while recording herself singing and dancing, declares her intention to use her father's gun to kill either him or herself, and ominously states that she will one day "disappear" and no one will ever know what has happened to her.

In her next video, she covers her face and arms in toothpaste and tears apart the stuffed animal she has slept with since she was a newborn. She then appears to come to her senses and becomes distraught upon seeing the ruined toy. In her next conversation with JLB, they discuss strange loop theory and her sense that the world has always been false. JLB says they need to "go out of game" so he can ask a serious question, surprising Casey. He says he is worried about her and admits he has considered calling the police to do a wellness check on her. Casey angrily asserts that her videos were not real, she was only playing along with the challenge, and Casey is not even her real name. She demands he cease contacting her and calls him a pedophile. Minutes later, a shaken JLB sends a final message imploring her not to go through with anything and to continue making videos.

Some time later, JLB recounts having been contacted by Casey a year after their previous exchange, whereupon she apologized and said she had spent time in an assisted care facility. They exchanged real names and eventually met in New York City, where she was participating in a theater program. Casey claimed that on the night she cut contact with JLB, she was transported to the World's Fair, but something pulled her back. JLB suggested it was his prayers.

== Cast ==
- Anna Cobb as Casey
- Michael J. Rogers as JLB

A number of performers appear in various real and staged YouTube videos, including Theo Anthony, Valeria Santiago, May "NyxFears" Leitz, N8 Detroit, Holly Frink, Trevor Lahey and the ASMR content creator Slight Sounds.

== Production ==
Jane Schoenbrun was inspired to write the film by their experiences as a teenager on the internet in the early 2000s, particularly on fanfiction sites and forums, and a desire to explore dysphoria and the ability to exist online "without a physical form and without a body." We're All Going to the World's Fair is the first of their "Screen Trilogy" that includes I Saw the TV Glow and Public Access Afterworld.

== Release ==
We're All Going to the World's Fair premiered in the Next section at the 2021 Sundance Film Festival on January 31, 2021. It had its Asia premiere at the 2021 Perspectives Film Festival in Singapore on October 21, 2021.

== Reception ==
=== Box office ===
In the United States and Canada, the film earned $12,750 from three theaters in its opening weekend.

=== Critical response ===
On Rotten Tomatoes, the film has an approval rating of 90% based on reviews from 118 critics, with an average rating of 7.4/10. The critics consensus reads: "Narratively challenging and visually haunting, We're All Going to the World's Fair adds a uniquely ambitious and unsettling entry to the crowded coming-of-age genre." On Metacritic, the film has a rating of 78 out of 100 based on 24 reviews, indicating "generally favorable reviews".

Some reviewers have interpreted the film as having themes of gender dysphoria. Of this, Schoenbrun, who is nonbinary, has said that they were trying "to do something that felt truthful to [their] coming-out process."

In June 2025, IndieWire ranked the film at number 80 on its list of "The 100 Best Movies of the 2020s (So Far)."
