= Jane Schoenbrun =

American filmmaker (born 1987)

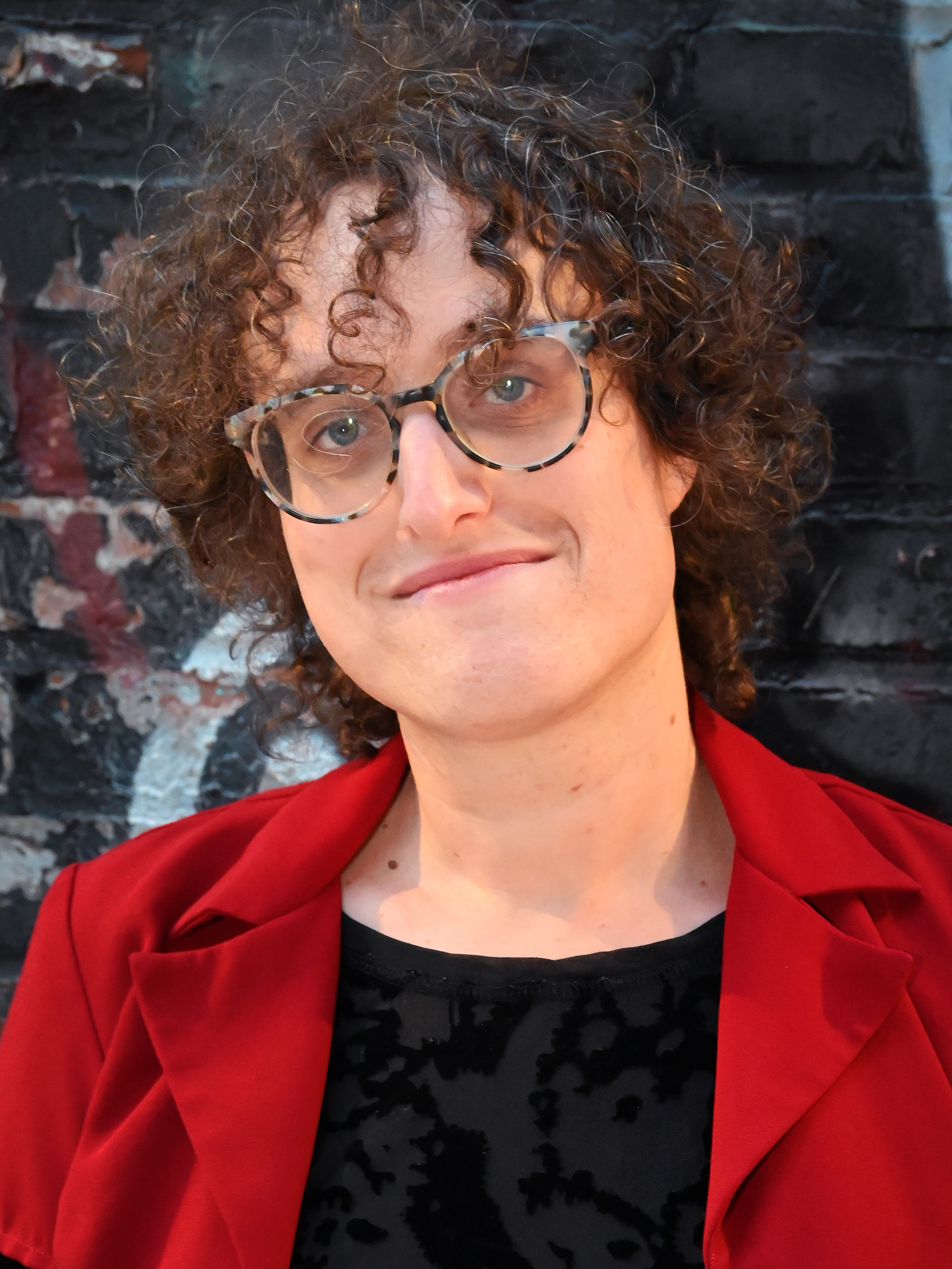
- Schoenbrun in 2025
- Born: February 5, 1987 (age 39); New York City, U.S.
- Education: Boston University (BS)
- Occupation: Filmmaker
- Spouse: Melissa Ader (m. 2014)

Jane Flannery Schoenbrun (/ˈʃoʊnbrən/; born February 5, 1987) is an American filmmaker. They are known for directing the films We're All Going to the World's Fair (2021), I Saw the TV Glow (2024), and Teenage Sex and Death at Camp Miasma (2026).

== Early life and education ==
Jane Flannery Schoenbrun was born to Jewish parents on February 5, 1987, in the Queens borough of New York City. They were raised in Ardsley, New York. They are the eldest of three siblings.

Schoenbrun was a horror fan as a child; in fifth grade, they spent a month watching the entire Nightmare on Elm Street series. Growing up, they worked at a local film theater. At age thirteen, Schoenbrun frequented online message boards, including forums dedicated to Buffy the Vampire Slayer, The X-Files, and various bands. They wrote fake spoilers for Buffy which were spread around the Internet as if they were authentic. They wrote fan fiction and spent a lot of time participating in online fan communities. Schoenbrun attributes this experience as informing the themes and content of their filmmaking.

They graduated from Boston University in 2009 with a bachelor's degree in film.

== Career ==
While in college, Schoenbrun worked as a production assistant on short films by the Safdie brothers. After graduating, they moved back to New York and began working for the Independent Filmmaker Project. From 2011 to 2019, they wrote articles for Filmmaker magazine. In 2014, they served as the lead of film partnerships at Kickstarter.

Schoenbrun made their directorial debut in 2018 with the documentary A Self-Induced Hallucination. The original upload of the documentary was on Vimeo on June 18, 2018. The documentary remained uploaded on the platform for several months before being taken down for unknown reasons. The film centers the fictional creepypasta Slender Man, being composed entirely of a compilation of found footage-style community-made videos that existed on YouTube prior to the documentary's creation. The documentary was inspired by other Slender Man videos, demonstrating how user-generated videos can create online communities and shared lore.

Their film We're All Going to the World's Fair premiered during the 2021 Sundance Film Festival. The film follows the story of a teenage girl named Casey, portrayed by Anna Cobb, who joins an "occult online game" and comes under the eye of a middle-aged man named JLB who expresses the desire to protect Casey from the ill effects of the game. Critical reception of the film included speculation on the nature of the relationship as predatory, though some critics note that nothing in the film explicitly supports this idea. The film was inspired by creepypasta aesthetics. Schoenbrun has stated that We're All Going to the World's Fair attempts to "use the language of cinema to articulate the hard-to-describe feeling of dysphoria," through its in-universe videos of participants of the World's Fair challenge experiencing unusual bodily symptoms. The film shares themes with A Self-Induced Hallucination and I Saw The TV Glow, such as trans community formation through shared interests in media, "self-annihilation" through media, and the blurring of reality and media. Critics noted that it paid homage to low-budget horror films such as Paranormal Activity.

On October 7, 2021, Deadline reported that Schoenbrun's next feature, I Saw the TV Glow, was in development. The film was co-produced by Fruit Tree and A24, the latter of which would also distribute the film. Starring Justice Smith and Jack Haven, (Note: Haven is credited as Brigette Lundy-Paine in the film, which was released prior to their coming out.) I Saw the TV Glow follows two teenage outcasts who bond over their shared love for a paranormal television series, only for them to lose touch with reality upon the show's cancellation. Schoenbrun has described a recurring childhood dream involving "the field behind the field" near their high school that served as a visual and thematic influence on the film's atmosphere and tone. Schoenbrun began writing the script for this film while they were about two months into hormone replacement therapy. They have stated that they view Justice Smith and Jack Haven's characters as being different sides of themself during the transition process. The film premiered at the 2024 Sundance Film Festival before screening at the Berlin International Film Festival and the South by Southwest Film Festival. I Saw the TV Glow was released in select theaters on May 3, 2024, before a wide release on May 17. The film was "hailed as an acutely intense psychodrama of self discovery."

In January 2023, The Film Stage announced that Schoenbrun was set to direct an adaptation of Imogen Binnie's 2013 novel Nevada, which is widely considered a classic of transgender literature. However, Schoenbrun confirmed in a May 2024 interview with The Cut that they had exited the project due to "creative differences with cis people."

In a June 2024 profile for The New Yorker, Schoenbrun revealed that their next film would be a slasher called Teenage Sex and Death at Camp Miasma. Schoenbrun said the film would follow a queer director who, while shooting a new installment of a popular horror franchise, becomes obsessed with casting the actress who played the "final girl" character in the original movie. The film was produced by Mubi and Plan B Entertainment. Hannah Einbinder and Gillian Anderson star in the film. On June 17, 2025, Schoenbrun announced on Twitter that the filming for Teenage Sex and Death at Camp Miasma had finished. The film premiered at the 2026 Cannes Film Festival.

Schoenbrun's first novel, Public Access Afterworld, was published on October 27, 2026, by the Penguin Random House imprint Hogarth Press, and received starred reviews from Kirkus Reviews and Publishers Weekly. The novel is a combination of fantasy, science fiction, horror, and coming-of-age literature. According to Schoenbrun, Public Access Afterworld will serve as the conclusion to a thematically-linked trilogy of works that includes We're All Going to the World's Fair and I Saw the TV Glow. Schoenbrun described the book as having a "huge mythology about a giant cast of characters with a story that spans centuries and sprawls across alternate universes. It's got a scope that a 90-minute film couldn't hold, and it's about transition, becoming, and truly closing that gap between self and screen until you feel like you're approximating some form of real life." The project was initially pitched as a television show.

On October 23, 2025, Deadline reported that Netflix ordered a straight-to-series adaptation of Charles Burns' graphic novel Black Hole, with Schoenbrun writing and directing. New Regency will serve as the co-studio alongside Netflix. Executive producers on the series include Plan B, Erin Levy, Charles Burns, Yariv Milchan, Arnon Milchan, Natalie Lehmann, and Laura Delahaye. Set in the 1970s, the novel follows teenagers in Seattle who contract a mysterious sexually transmitted infection known as "the Bug" which causes them to develop bizarre physical mutations.

== Style and themes ==
Schoenbrun's work frequently explores themes of dysphoria, mediated identity, and blurring the line between reality and fantasy. They have described these frequent themes as central to their art, often drawing from experience they encountered in online spaces and from unarticulated feelings regarding their queer identity that they did not have the words for at the time.

Schoenbrun has discussed how these internet communities helped inform their thematic approach to A Self Induced Hallucination and later projects, specifically their interest in participatory digital storytelling and boundaries between online identity and fantasy.

Gender identity and dysphoria are prominent themes in Schoenbrun's work. They have frequently described I Saw the TV Glow as a film about the "egg crack", a term for the moment in a trans person's life when they realize their identity does not correspond to their assigned gender. Schoenbrun and critics alike have written of how the representations of transgender and trans-adjacent characters within their filmography are for trans people, and are coded in ways that do not make it explicit for audiences who are unfamiliar with transness or are not trans themselves. Schoenbrun has described the presence of screens, which are frequently featured in their work, as "a metaphor for the ways in which we don't experience ourselves when we're going through dysphoria and coming to terms with transness." Critics have compared Schoenbrun's work to that of David Cronenberg and Kiyoshi Kurosawa in dealing with interactions between the human body and technology.

== Personal life ==
Schoenbrun is transfeminine and non-binary. They realized they were trans while on psilocybin mushrooms in April 2019, during the process of writing We're All Going to the World's Fair. They subsequently came out after the project wrapped in 2020; one of Schoenbrun's long-term partners, who was the first person to suggest they were trans, is thanked in the credits of the film.

Schoenbrun married Melissa Ader in 2014. The two met in high school.

With the exception of their mother, they are estranged from their immediate family. They are polyamorous and have three partners. As of 2024, they maintain residences in Brooklyn and Chatham, New York.

== Filmography ==
=== Feature film ===
Year	Title	Director	Writer	Producer	Editor
2016	collective:unconscious	No	Concept	Executive	No
2017	Village People	No	Yes	No	No
2021	We're All Going to the World's Fair	Yes	Yes	Yes	Yes
2024	I Saw the TV Glow	Yes	Yes	No	No
2026	Teenage Sex and Death at Camp Miasma	Yes	Yes	No	No

=== Documentary ===
Year	Title	Director	Producer	Writer	Editor	Notes
2015	The School Is Watching	Yes	Yes	Yes	Yes	Documentary short
2018	A Self-Induced Hallucination	Yes	No	Yes	Yes	

=== Producer ===
Year	Title	Notes
2012	Speechless	Co-producer
2016	Black Soil, Green Grass	Executive producer
2016	Swallowed	Executive producer
2017	Lovewatch	Associate producer
2018	Gwilliam's Tips For Turning Tricks Into Treats	Executive producer
2019	Tux and Fanny	Executive producer
2019	Pots N' Tots	Executive producer
2019	Chained for Life	
2019	Dick Pics! (A Documentary)	Executive producer
2019	Laying Out	Executive producer
2020	The Starr Sisters	Executive producer
2023	Girl Internet Show: A Kati Kelli Mixtape	
2024	Dream Team	Executive producer

=== Actor ===
Year	Title	Notes
2025	Castration Movie Anthology ii: The Best of Both Worlds	Post-credits cameo
2026	Castration Movie Anthology iii: Year of the Hyaena	Actor

=== Music video ===
Year	Song	Artist	Ref.
2023	"Night Shift"	Lucy Dacus	

== Publications ==
- Public Access Afterworld. Hogarth Press. 2026. ISBN 9780593978382.

== Reception ==
Year	Film	Rotten Tomatoes	Metacritic	Box Office
2022	We're All Going to the World's Fair	91% (123 reviews)	78 (24 reviews)	$116,523
2024	I Saw the TV Glow	85% (234 reviews)	86 (48 reviews)	$5.4 million
2026	Teenage Sex and Death at Camp Miasma	95% (226 reviews)	89 (48 reviews)	TBA

== Awards and nominations ==
Year	Award	Category	Nominated work	Result
2021	Denver International Film Festival	Best Feature Film	We're All Going to the World's Fair	Nominated
2021	Fantasia Film Festival	Camera Lucida AQCC Award	We're All Going to the World's Fair	Nominated
2021	Gijón International Film Festival	Best Film	We're All Going to the World's Fair	Nominated
2021	Indie Memphis Film Festival	Best Narrative Feature	We're All Going to the World's Fair	Nominated
2021	Montclair Film Festival	Future/Now Special Jury Prize for Visionary Filmmaking	We're All Going to the World's Fair	Won
2021	Nashville Film Festival	Grand Jury Prize of Best Graveyard Shift Feature	We're All Going to the World's Fair	Nominated
2021	Oldenburg Film Festival	German Independence Award/Audience Award for Best Film	We're All Going to the World's Fair	Nominated
2021	Sundance Film Festival	NEXT Innovator Award	We're All Going to the World's Fair	Nominated
2021	Warsaw International Film Festival	Free Spirit Award	We're All Going to the World's Fair	Nominated
2022	Gotham Awards	Bingham Ray Breakthrough Director Award	We're All Going to the World's Fair	Nominated
2022	Indiana Film Journalists Association, US	Breakout of the Year	We're All Going to the World's Fair	Nominated
2022	Chicago Film Critics Association Awards	Most Promising Filmmaker	We're All Going to the World's Fair	Nominated
2022	Americana Film Fest	Audience Award	We're All Going to the World's Fair	Nominated
2024	Berlin International Film Festival	Panorama Audience Award	I Saw the TV Glow	Nominated
2024	Berlin International Film Festival	Teddy Award	I Saw the TV Glow	Nominated
2024	SXSW Film Awards	Audience Award for Festival Favorites	I Saw the TV Glow	Nominated
2024	Chicago Film Critics Association Award	Best Director	I Saw the TV Glow	Nominated
2024	Florida Film Critics Circle Award	Best Original Screenplay	I Saw the TV Glow	Won
2024	Gotham Independent Film Award	Best Director	I Saw the TV Glow	Nominated
2024	Independent Spirit Award	Best Director	I Saw the TV Glow	Nominated
2024	Independent Spirit Award	Best Screenplay	I Saw the TV Glow	Nominated
2024	Kansas City Film Critics Circle Award	Tom Poe Award for Best LGBTQ Film	I Saw the TV Glow	Won
2024	Seattle Film Critics Society	Inaugural SIFF 2024 Award	I Saw the TV Glow	Won
2024	Chlotrudis Awards	Best Screenplay Winner	I Saw the TV Glow	Won
2024	Fangoria Chainsaw Awards	Best Limited Release Film	I Saw the TV Glow	Won
2024	The Dorian Awards	LGBTQ Movie of the Year	I Saw the TV Glow	Won
2024	Champs-Élysées Film Festival	Audience Award for Best American Independent Feature Film	I Saw the TV Glow	Won
2026	Cannes Film Festival	Un Certain Regard	Teenage Sex and Death at Camp Miasma	Nominated
2026	Cannes Film Festival	Queer Palm	Teenage Sex and Death at Camp Miasma	Won
2026	Gotham Independent Film Awards	Best Feature	Teenage Sex and Death at Camp Miasma	Pending
2026	Gotham Independent Film Awards	Best Director	Teenage Sex and Death at Camp Miasma	Pending
