= List of American films of 2024 =

This is a list of American films released in 2024.

The year featured a diverse array of cinematic productions, ranging from major studio blockbusters to independent and streaming platform releases. The 2023 Hollywood labor disputes, including the Writers Guild of America strike and SAG-AFTRA strike, had a significant impact on the 2024 release schedule, with many films being postponed due to productions being halted mid-filming or before commencement.

Following the box office section, this list is organized chronologically, providing information on release dates, production companies, directors, and principal cast members.

== Box office ==
The highest-grossing American films released in 2024, by domestic box office gross revenue, are as follows:

Highest-grossing films of 2024
Rank	Title	Distributor	Domestic gross
1	Inside Out 2	Disney	$652,980,194
2	Deadpool & Wolverine	Disney	$636,742,741
3	Wicked	Universal	$473,231,120
4	Moana 2	Disney	$460,405,297
5	Despicable Me 4	Universal	$361,004,205
6	Beetlejuice Beetlejuice	Warner Bros.	$294,097,060
7	Dune: Part Two	Warner Bros.	$282,144,358
8	Twisters	Universal	$267,762,265
9	Mufasa: The Lion King	Disney	$254,567,693
10	Sonic the Hedgehog 3	Paramount	$236,115,100

== January–March ==
Opening		Title	Company credits	Cast and crew	Ref.
J A N U A R Y	2	The Mummy Murders	Gravitas Ventures	Colin Bressler (director/screenplay); Will Donahue (screenplay); Leila Annastasia Scott, Jason Scarbrough, Jeff Caperton, Will Donahue, Aimee Michelle, Destiny Soria, Cole Springer, Isak Tufic	
J A N U A R Y	3	Self Reliance	Neon / Hulu / MRC / Paramount Global Content Distribution	Jake Johnson (director/screenplay); Jake Johnson, Anna Kendrick, Natalie Morales, Mary Holland, Emily Hampshire, Christopher Lloyd, Wayne Brady, Andy Samberg	
J A N U A R Y	4	DarkGame	Gravitas Ventures	Howard J. Ford (director); Gary Grant, Niall Johnson (screenplay); Ed Westwick, Andrew P. Stephen, Natalya Tsvetkova, Lola Wayne, Rory Alexander, Rose Reynolds	
J A N U A R Y	5	Night Swim	Universal Pictures / Blumhouse Productions / Atomic Monster	Bryce McGuire (director/screenplay); Wyatt Russell, Kerry Condon, Amélie Hoeferle, Gavin Warren	
J A N U A R Y	5	He Went That Way	Vertical Entertainment / Mister Smith Entertainment	Jeffrey Darling (director); Evan M. Wiener (screenplay); Jacob Elordi, Zachary Quinto, Patrick J. Adams	
J A N U A R Y	5	The Painter	Republic Pictures	Kimani Ray Smith (director); Brian Buccellato (screenplay); Charlie Weber, Jon Voight, Marie Avgeropoulos, Max Montesi, Rryla McIntosh, Luisa D'Oliveira	
J A N U A R Y	5	The Bricklayer	Vertical Entertainment / Millennium Media	Renny Harlin (director); Hanna Weg, Matt Johnson (screenplay); Aaron Eckhart, Nina Dobrev, Tim Blake Nelson, Ilfenesh Hadera, Clifton Collins Jr.	
J A N U A R Y	5	Some Other Woman	Radiant Films International / Balcony 9 Productions	Joel David Moore (director); Yuri Baranovsky, Angela Gulner, Josh Long (screenplay); Amanda Crew, Tom Felton, Ashley Greene	
J A N U A R Y	5	Fugitive Dreams	Freestyle Releasing	Jason Neulander (director/screenplay); April Matthis, Robbie Tann, Scott Shepherd, O-Lan Jones, David Patrick Kelly	
J A N U A R Y	5	Husband for Sale	Media Ave Studios	Peter Takla (director/screenplay); Ayman Mansour, Faltaos Tamer, Mena Maurice, Dina Girgis, Mariam Bebawi, Seif Nessim, Josephine Adel, Febronia Gendy	
J A N U A R Y	9	We Strangers	Pigasus Pictures, Wingate Media, Mirmade, Killjoy Films	Anu Valia (director); Kirby Howell-Baptiste, Tina Lifford, Sarah Goldberg, Maria Dizzia, Kara Young, Hari Dhillon, Paul Adelstein, Mischa Reddy	
J A N U A R Y	12	The Beekeeper	Metro-Goldwyn-Mayer / Miramax	David Ayer (director); Kurt Wimmer (screenplay); Jason Statham, Emmy Raver-Lampman, Josh Hutcherson, Bobby Naderi, Minnie Driver, Phylicia Rashad, Jeremy Irons	
J A N U A R Y	12	Mean Girls	Paramount Pictures / Broadway Video / Little Stranger	Arturo Perez Jr., Samantha Jayne (directors); Tina Fey (screenplay); Angourie Rice, Reneé Rapp, Auliʻi Cravalho, Jaquel Spivey, Avantika, Bebe Wood, Christopher Briney, Jenna Fischer, Busy Philipps, Tina Fey, Tim Meadows	
J A N U A R Y	12	The Book of Clarence	TriStar Pictures / Legendary Pictures	Jeymes Samuel (director/screenplay); LaKeith Stanfield, Omar Sy, Anna Diop, RJ Cyler, David Oyelowo, Micheal Ward, Alfre Woodard, Teyana Taylor, Caleb McLaughlin, Eric Kofi-Abrefa, Marianne Jean-Baptiste, James McAvoy, Benedict Cumberbatch	
J A N U A R Y	12	Lift	Netflix / Genre Films / 6th & Idaho Productions	F. Gary Gray (director); Daniel Kunka (screenplay); Kevin Hart, Gugu Mbatha-Raw, Vincent D’Onofrio, Úrsula Corberó, Billy Magnussen, Kim Yoon-ji, Viveik Kalra, Jacob Batalon, Jean Reno, Sam Worthington	
J A N U A R Y	12	Role Play	Amazon MGM Studios / The Picture Company / StudioCanal	Thomas Vincent (director); Seth Owen (screenplay); Kaley Cuoco, David Oyelowo, Connie Nielsen, Bill Nighy	
J A N U A R Y	12	The Night They Came Home	Lionsgate Home Entertainment	Paul G. Volk (director); John A. Russo, James O'Brien (screenplay); Charlie Townsend, Danny Trejo, Robert Carradine, Weston Coppola Cage, Brian Austin Green	
J A N U A R Y	12	Destroy All Neighbors	RLJE Films / Shudder	Josh Forbes (director); Mike Benner, Jared Logan, Charles A. Pieper (screenplay); Jonah Ray, Kiran Deol, Randee Heller, Pete Ploszek	
J A N U A R Y	12	Hellhound	Saban Films / Mbrella Films	Joshua Dixon (director); Niccolô de la Fère (screenplay); Louis Mandylor, Ron Smoorenburg, Vithaya Pansringarm	
J A N U A R Y	17	Wanted Man	Quiver Distribution / Millennium Media	Dolph Lundgren (director/screenplay); Michael Worth, Hank Hughes (screenplay); Dolph Lundgren, Kelsey Grammer, Christina Villa, Michael Paré, Roger Cross	
J A N U A R Y	19	I.S.S.	Bleecker Street / LD Entertainment	Gabriela Cowperthwaite (director); Nick Shafir (screenplay); Ariana DeBose, Chris Messina, John Gallagher Jr., Masha Mashkova, Costa Ronin, Pilou Asbæk	
J A N U A R Y	19	Sunrise	Lionsgate / Grindstone Entertainment Group	Andrew Baird (director); Ronan Blaney (screenplay); Alex Pettyfer, Guy Pearce, Crystal Yu, William Gao, Kurt Yaeger, Olwen Fouéré	
J A N U A R Y	19	Which Brings Me to You	Decal / Anonymous Content	Peter Hutchings (director); Keith Bunin (screenplay); Lucy Hale, Nat Wolff, Britne Oldford, Genevieve Angelson, Alexander Hodge, John Gallagher Jr.	
J A N U A R Y	19	Cult Killer	Saban Films	Jon Keeyes (director); Charles Burnley (screenplay); Alice Eve, Antonio Banderas, Paul Reid, Shelley Hennig	
J A N U A R Y	19	Founders Day	Dark Sky Films / Blue Finch Films / Mainframe Pictures	Erik Bloomquist (director/screenplay); Carson Bloomquist (screenplay); Devin Druid, Amy Hargreaves, Naomi Grace, Catherine Curtin, Emilia McCarthy, Olivia Nikkanen, William Russ	
J A N U A R Y	23	Murder and Cocktails	905 Productions / Vision Films	Henry Barrial (director); Ron Jackson (screenplay); Jason Bernardo, Jessicah Neufeld, Colleen O'Shaughnessey, Ricardo Molina, Lucy Boryer, Brian Lally, Nerissa Tedesco, Caroline Amiguet, Jeff Nimoy	
J A N U A R Y	24	Beautiful Wedding	Voltage Pictures / Wattpad Studios	Roger Kumble (director/screenplay); Jamie McGuire (screenplay); Dylan Sprouse, Virginia Gardner, Libe Barer, Austin North, Neil Bishop, Alex Aiono, Micky Dartford, Jack Hesketh, Declan Laird, Trevor Van Uden	
J A N U A R Y	26	Miller's Girl	Lionsgate / Point Grey Pictures	Jade Halley Bartlett (director/screenplay); Martin Freeman, Jenna Ortega, Dagmara Domińczyk, Bashir Salahuddin, Christine Adams, Gideon Adlon	
J A N U A R Y	26	The Underdoggs	Amazon MGM Studios / Metro-Goldwyn-Mayer / Khalabo Ink Society	Charles Stone (director); Danny Segal, Isaac Schamis (screenplay); Snoop Dogg, Tika Sumpter, Mike Epps, Andrew Schulz, George Lopez	
J A N U A R Y	26	Sometimes I Think About Dying	Oscilloscope Laboratories	Rachel Lambert (director); Kevin Armento, Stefanie Abel Horowitz, Katy Wright-Mead (screenplay); Daisy Ridley, Dave Merheje, Parvesh Cheena, Marcia DeBonis, Meg Stalter, Brittany O'Grady, Bree Elrod	
J A N U A R Y	26	American Star	IFC Films	Gonzalo López-Gallego (director); Nacho Faerna (screenplay); Ian McShane, Nora Arnezeder, Fanny Ardant, Thomas Kretschmann, Adam Nagaitis	
J A N U A R Y	26	Cold Copy	Vertical Entertainment	Roxine Helberg (director/screenplay); Bel Powley, Tracee Ellis Ross, Jacob Tremblay, Nesta Cooper, James Tupper, Ekaterina Baker	
J A N U A R Y	26	Junction	VMI Releasing / Verdi Productions	Bryan Greenberg (director/screenplay); Bryan Greenberg, Ryan Eggold, Jamie Chung, Sophia Bush, Griffin Dunne, Josh Peck	
J A N U A R Y	26	Hundreds of Beavers	SRH	Mike Cheslik (director); Mike Cheslik, Ryland Brickson Cole, Tews (screenplay); Ryland Brickson Cole, Tews, Olivia Graves, Wes Tank, Doug Mancheski, Luis Rico	
J A N U A R Y	30	There Is a Monster	Gravitas Ventures	Mike Taylor (director/screenplay); Joey Collins, Ena O'Rourke, Jesse Milliner, MerryRose Howley	
F E B R U A R Y	2	Argylle	Universal Pictures / Apple Studios / Marv Studios	Matthew Vaughn (director); Jason Fuchs (screenplay); Bryce Dallas Howard, Sam Rockwell, Bryan Cranston, Catherine O'Hara, Henry Cavill, Sofia Boutella, Dua Lipa, Ariana DeBose, John Cena, Samuel L. Jackson	
F E B R U A R Y	2	Orion and the Dark	Netflix / DreamWorks Animation	Sean Charmatz (director); Charlie Kaufman (screenplay); Jacob Tremblay, Paul Walter Hauser, Colin Hanks, Mia Akemi Brown, Ike Barinholtz, Nat Faxon, Golda Rosheuvel, Natasia Demetriou, Aparna Nancherla, Carla Gugino, Matt Dellapina, Angela Bassett	
F E B R U A R Y	2	The Tiger's Apprentice	Paramount+ / Paramount Animation / New Republic Pictures	Raman Hui, Paul Watling, Yong Duk Jhun (directors); David Magee, Christopher Yost (screenplay); Henry Golding, Brandon Soo Hoo, Lucy Liu, Sandra Oh, Michelle Yeoh	
F E B R U A R Y	2	Suncoast	Searchlight Pictures / Hulu	Laura Chinn (director/screenplay); Laura Linney, Nico Parker, Woody Harrelson	
F E B R U A R Y	2	Scrambled	Lionsgate / Roadside Attractions	Leah McKendrick (director/screenplay); Leah McKendrick, Ego Nwodim, Andrew Santino, Adam Rodriguez, Laura Cerón, Clancy Brown	
F E B R U A R Y	2	Bosco	Peacock	Nicholas Manuel Pino (director/screenplay); Aubrey Joseph, Nikki Blonsky, Tyrese Gibson, Theo Rossi, Thomas Jane, Vivica A. Fox	
F E B R U A R Y	2	Somewhere Quiet	Vertical Entertainment	Olivia West Lloyd (director/screenplay); Jennifer Kim, Kentucker Audley, Marin Ireland, Micheál Neeson	
F E B R U A R Y	2	The Monk and the Gun	Roadside Attractions	Pawo Choyning Dorji (director/screenplay); Harry Einhorn, Tandin Wangchuk, Deki Lhamo, Pema Zangmo Sherpa, Tandin Sonam, Choeying Jatsho, Tandin Phubz, Yuphel Lhendup, Kelsang Choejay	
F E B R U A R Y	2	A Nashville Wish	Vision Films / Brentwood Avenue Entertainment / D Street Films	Demetrius Navarro (director); Ty DeMartino (screenplay); Maxfield Camp, Kaileigh Bullard, Alexis Gomez, Kevin Sizemore, Kourtney Hansen, Ryan O'Quinn, Kate Orsini, Caleb Shore, Craig Shumaker, T. Graham Brown, Waylon Payne, Lee Greenwood	
F E B R U A R Y	9	Lisa Frankenstein	Focus Features	Zelda Williams (director); Diablo Cody (screenplay); Kathryn Newton, Cole Sprouse, Liza Soberano, Henry Eikenberry, Joe Chrest, Carla Gugino	
F E B R U A R Y	9	Upgraded	Amazon MGM Studios	Carlson Young (director); Christine Lenig, Justin Matthews, Luke Roberts, Karl Hall (screenplay); Camila Mendes, Archie Renaux, Thomas Kretschmann, Grégory Montel, Aimee Carrero, Andrew Schulz, Rachel Matthews, Lena Olin, Marisa Tomei	
F E B R U A R Y	9	Air Force One Down	Republic Pictures	James Bamford (director); Steven Paul (screenplay); Katherine McNamara, Ian Bohen, Dascha Polanco, Anthony Michael Hall	
F E B R U A R Y	9	Lola	Vertical Entertainment	Nicola Peltz (director/screenplay), Bria Vinaite (director); Nicola Peltz, Virginia Madsen, Richie Merritt, Trevor Long, Raven Goodwin, Luke David Blumm	
F E B R U A R Y	9	Marmalade	Signature Films / Tea Shop Productions	Keir O'Donnell (director/screenplay); Joe Keery, Camila Morrone, Aldis Hodge	
F E B R U A R Y	13	ElemenTory	Vision Films	Terrence Arlyn (director/screenplay); Shaun Paul Costello, Juliette Valdez, Big Daddy Kane, Glenn Plummer, Charles W Harris III	
F E B R U A R Y	14	Bob Marley: One Love	Paramount Pictures / Plan B Entertainment / Tuff Gong Pictures	Reinaldo Marcus Green (director/screenplay); Zach Baylin, Frank E. Flowers, Terence Winter (screenplay); Kingsley Ben-Adir, Lashana Lynch, James Norton	
F E B R U A R Y	14	Madame Web	Columbia Pictures / Marvel Entertainment / Di Bonaventura Pictures	S. J. Clarkson (director/screenplay); Claire Parker (screenplay); Dakota Johnson, Sydney Sweeney, Celeste O'Connor, Isabela Merced, Tahar Rahim, Mike Epps, Emma Roberts, Adam Scott	
F E B R U A R Y	14	Players	Netflix	Trish Sie (director); Whit Anderson (screenplay); Gina Rodriguez, Damon Wayans Jr., Tom Ellis, Liza Koshy, Joel Courtney, Augustus Prew	
F E B R U A R Y	14	What About Love	XWS / Quality Films / Accident Films	Klaus Menzel (director/screenplay); Douglas Day Stewart (screenplay); Sharon Stone, Andy García, Iain Glen, José Coronado, Maia Morgenstern	
F E B R U A R Y	14	Adam the First	Electric Entertainment	Irving Franco (director); Oakes Fegley, David Duchovny, T.R. Knight, Larry Pine, Billy Slaughter, Jason Dowies, Eric Hanson	
F E B R U A R Y	14	Stranger in the Woods	Red Hound Films / Wonk	Adam Newacheck (director); Holly Kenney (screenplay); Holly Kenney, Brendin Brown, Paris Nicole, Radek Antczak, Teddy Spencer	
F E B R U A R Y	16	This Is Me... Now: A Love Story	Amazon MGM Studios / Nuyorican Productions	Dave Meyers (director); Jennifer Lopez (screenplay); Jennifer Lopez, Joe Cartagena, Kim Petras, Austin Post, Sofía Vergara, Jenifer Lewis, Jay Shetty, Neil deGrasse Tyson, Sadhguru, Derek Hough, Ben Affleck	
F E B R U A R Y	16	Land of Bad	The Avenue / Highland Film Group	William Eubank (director/screenplay); David Frigerio (screenplay); Liam Hemsworth, Russell Crowe, Luke Hemsworth, Ricky Whittle, Milo Ventimiglia	
F E B R U A R Y	16	Bleeding Love	Vertical Entertainment / Killer Films	Emma Westenberg (director); Ruby Caster (screenplay); Clara McGregor, Ewan McGregor, Kim Zimmer, Devyn McDowell, Sasha Alexander, Jake Weary, Vera Bulder	
F E B R U A R Y	16	Lights Out	Quiver Distribution / Firebrand	Christian Sesma (director); Chad Law, Garry Charles (screenplay); Frank Grillo, Mekhi Phifer, Jaime King, Dermot Mulroney, Scott Adkins	
F E B R U A R Y	16	No Way Up	RLJE Films / Altitude Film Entertainment	Claudio Fäh (director); Andy Mayson (screenplay); Colm Meany, Phyllis Logan, Will Attenborough	
F E B R U A R Y	16	Altered Reality	K Street Pictures	Don E. FauntLeRoy (director); Charles Agron (screenplay); Tobin Bell, Charles Agron, Alyona Khmara, Krista Dane Hoffman, Edward Asner, Lance Henriksen	
F E B R U A R Y	22	Lovely, Dark, and Deep	XYZ Films	Teresa Sutherland (director/screenplay); Georgina Campbell, Nick Blood, Wai Ching Ho	
F E B R U A R Y	23	Drive-Away Dolls	Focus Features / Working Title Films	Ethan Coen (director/screenplay); Tricia Cooke (screenplay); Margaret Qualley, Geraldine Viswanathan, Beanie Feldstein, Colman Domingo, Pedro Pascal, Bill Camp, Matt Damon	
F E B R U A R Y	23	Ordinary Angels	Lionsgate / Kingdom Story Company / Vertigo Entertainment / Stampede Ventures	Jon Gunn (director); Kelly Fremon Craig, Meg Tilly (screenplay); Hilary Swank, Alan Ritchson, Nancy Travis, Tamala Jones	
F E B R U A R Y	23	Mea Culpa	Netflix / Tyler Perry Studios	Tyler Perry (director/screenplay); Kelly Rowland, Trevante Rhodes, RonReaco Lee, Shannon Thornton, Angela Robinson	
F E B R U A R Y	23	Drugstore June	Shout! Studios / All Things Comedy / Utopia	Nicholaus Goossen (director/screenplay); Esther Povitsky (screenplay); Esther Povitsky, Miranda Cosgrove, Bill Burr, Haley Joel Osment, Jackie Sandler, James Remar, Beverly D'Angelo	
F E B R U A R Y	23	Parallel	Vertical Entertainment	Kourosh Ahari (director); Edwin Hodge, Aldis Hodge, Jonathan Keasey (screenplay); Danielle Deadwyler, Aldis Hodge, Edwin Hodge	
F E B R U A R Y	23	Red Right Hand	Redbox Entertainment / Magnolia Pictures	Ian Nelms, Eshom Nelms (directors); Jonathan Easley (screenplay); Orlando Bloom, Andie MacDowell, Scott Haze, Garret Dillahunt, Mo McRae, Brian Geraghty	
F E B R U A R Y	24	Blue Christmas	Dreampost Media	Max Allan Collins (director/screenplay); Rob Merritt, Alisabeth Von Presley, Chris Causey	
F E B R U A R Y	27	The Neon Highway	Sessions Production Payroll / Mountain Movies	William Wages (director/screenplay); Phillip Rob Bellury (screenplay); Rob Mayes, Beau Bridges, Sam Hennings, T.J. Power, Lee Brice, Pam Tillis	
M A R C H	1	Dune: Part Two	Warner Bros. Pictures / Legendary Pictures	Denis Villeneuve (director/screenplay); Jon Spaihts, Eric Roth (screenplay); Timothée Chalamet, Zendaya, Rebecca Ferguson, Josh Brolin, Austin Butler, Florence Pugh, Dave Bautista, Christopher Walken, Léa Seydoux, Souheila Yacoub, Stellan Skarsgård, Charlotte Rampling, Javier Bardem	
M A R C H	1	Spaceman	Netflix / Tango Entertainment / Free Association	Johan Renck (director); Colby Day (screenplay); Adam Sandler, Carey Mulligan, Kunal Nayyar, Lena Olin, Isabella Rossellini, Paul Dano	
M A R C H	1	Problemista	A24 / Fruit Tree	Julio Torres (director/screenplay); Julio Torres, Tilda Swinton, RZA, Greta Lee, Catalina Saavedra, James Scully, Isabella Rossellini	
M A R C H	1	Megamind vs. the Doom Syndicate	Peacock / DreamWorks Animation Television	Eric Fogel (director); Alan Schoolcraft, Brent Simons (screenplay); Keith Ferguson, Josh Brener, Maya Aoki Tuttle, Emily Tunon, Talon Warburton, Scott Adsit, Chris Sullivan, Tony Hale, Jeanine Mason, Adam Lambert	
M A R C H	1	Outlaw Posse	Quiver Distribution	Mario Van Peebles (director/screenplay); Mario Van Peebles, William Mapother, John Carroll Lynch, D.C. Young Fly, Mandela Van Peebles, Amber Reign Smith, Jake Manley, Allen Payne, Neal McDonough, Cam Gigandet, M. Emmet Walsh, Edward James Olmos, Cedric the Entertainer, Whoopi Goldberg	
M A R C H	1	Asleep in My Palm	Strike Back Studios	Henry Nelson (director/screenplay); Tim Blake Nelson, Chloë Kerwin, Jared Abrahamson, Grant Harvey, Gus Birney, David Aaron Baker	
M A R C H	7	Ricky Stanicky	Amazon MGM Studios	Peter Farrelly (director/screenplay); Brian Jarvis, James L. Freeman, Jeffrey Bushell, Steve Oedekerk (screenplay); Zac Efron, John Cena, Jermaine Fowler, Andrew Santino, Lex Scott Davis, William H. Macy	
M A R C H	7	The Thundermans Return	Paramount+ / Nickelodeon Movies / Awesomeness Films	Trevor Kirschner (director); Sean William Cunningham, Marc Dworkin, Jed Spingarn, Eric Donald (screenplay); Kira Kosarin, Jack Griffo, Diego Velazquez, Diego Velazquez, Maya Le Clark, Chris Tallman, Rosa Blasi	
M A R C H	8	Kung Fu Panda 4	Universal Pictures / DreamWorks Animation	Mike Mitchell (director); Jonathan Aibel, Glenn Berger, Darren Lemke (screenplay); Jack Black, Awkwafina, Bryan Cranston, James Hong, Ian McShane, Ke Huy Quan, Dustin Hoffman, Viola Davis	
M A R C H	8	Imaginary	Lionsgate / Blumhouse Productions	Jeff Wadlow (director/screenplay); Greg Erb, Jason Oremland (screenplay); DeWanda Wise, Tom Payne, Taegen Burns, Pyper Braun, Veronica Falcón, Betty Buckley	
M A R C H	8	Damsel	Netflix / Roth/Kirschenbaum Films	Juan Carlos Fresnadillo (director); Dan Mazeau (screenplay); Millie Bobby Brown, Ray Winstone, Nick Robinson, Shohreh Aghdashloo, Angela Bassett, Robin Wright	
M A R C H	8	Love Lies Bleeding	A24 / Film4	Rose Glass (director/screenplay); Weronika Tofilska (screenplay); Kristen Stewart, Katy O'Brian, Ed Harris, Jena Malone, Anna Baryshnikov, Dave Franco	
M A R C H	8	Cabrini	Angel Studios	Alejandro Monteverde (director); Rod Barr (screenplay); Cristiana Dell'Anna, David Morse, Romana Maggiora Vergano, Federico Ielapi, Virginia Bocelli, Rolando Villazón, Giancarlo Giannini, John Lithgow	
M A R C H	8	Accidental Texan	Roadside Attractions	Mark Bristol (director); Julie B. Denny (screenplay); Thomas Haden Church, Rudy Pankow, Carrie-Anne Moss, Bruce Dern	
M A R C H	8	American Dreamer	Vertical Entertainment	Paul Dektor (director); Theodore Melfi (screenplay); Peter Dinklage, Shirley MacLaine, Matt Dillon, Danny Glover, Kimberly Quinn, Danny Pudi, Michelle Mylett	
M A R C H	8	Night Shift	Quiver Distribution	Paul China, Benjamin China (directors/screenplay); Phoebe Tonkin, Lamorne Morris, Madison Hu	
M A R C H	8	Glitter & Doom	Music Box Films	Tom Gustafson (director); Cory Krueckeberg (screenplay); Alex Diaz, Alan Cammish, Ming-Na Wen, Missi Pyle	
M A R C H	11	The Primevals	Full Moon Entertainment / Castel Film Romania	David W. Allen (director/screenplay); Randall William Cook (screenplay); Richard Joseph Paul, Juliet Mills, Leon Russom, Walker Brandt, Robert Cornthwaite	
M A R C H	13	Little Wing	Paramount+ / Awesomeness Films	Dean Israelite (director); John Gatins (screenplay); Brian Cox, Kelly Reilly, Brooklynn Prince, Che Tafari, Lowell Deo, Trinity Jo-Li Bliss	
M A R C H	15	Arthur the King	Lionsgate / Entertainment One / Tucker Tooley Entertainment	Simon Cellan Jones (director); Michael Brandt (screenplay); Mark Wahlberg, Simu Liu, Juliet Rylance, Nathalie Emmanuel, Ali Suliman, Bear Grylls, Paul Guilfoyle	
M A R C H	15	The American Society of Magical Negroes	Focus Features	Kobi Libbi (director/screenplay); Justice Smith, David Alan Grier, An-Li Bogan, Drew Tarver, Michaela Watkins, Rupert Friend, Nicole Byer	
M A R C H	15	Shirley	Netflix / Participant / Royal Ties Productions	John Ridley (director/screenplay); Regina King, Lance Reddick, Lucas Hedges, Brian Stokes Mitchell, Christina Jackson, Michael Cherrie, Dorian Missick, Amirah Vann, André Holland, Terrence Howard	
M A R C H	15	Irish Wish	Netflix / Motion Picture Corporation of America	Janeen Damian (director); Kirsten Hansen (screenplay); Lindsay Lohan, Ed Speleers, Alexander Vlahos, Ayesha Curry, Elizabeth Tan, Jane Seymour	
M A R C H	15	One Life	Bleecker Street / BBC Film / FilmNation Entertainment	James Hawes (director); Lucinda Coxon, Nick Drake (screenplay); Anthony Hopkins, Helena Bonham Carter, Johnny Flynn, Lena Olin, Romola Garai, Alex Sharp, Jonathan Pryce	
M A R C H	15	Knox Goes Away	Saban Films / FilmNation Entertainment / Brookstreet Pictures	Michael Keaton (director); Gregory Poirier (screenplay); Michael Keaton, Al Pacino, Marcia Gay Harden, James Marsden, Suzy Nakamura, John Hoogenakker, Joanna Kulig, Ray McKinnon, Lela Loren	
M A R C H	15	Snack Shack	Republic Pictures / MRC / T-Street	Adam Carter Rehmeier (director/screenplay); Conor Sherry, Gabriel LaBelle, Mika Abdalla, David Costabile, Nick Robinson	
M A R C H	15	Prey	Vertical / Voltage Pictures	Mukunda Michael Dewil (director/screenplay); Ryan Phillippe, Mena Suvari, Emile Hirsch, Dylan Flashner, Tristan Thompson, Jeremy Tardy	
M A R C H	19	Bardejov	Gravitas Ventures	Danny A. Abeckaser (director); Shmuel Lynn (screenplay); Danny A. Abeckaser, Julian Brass, Robert Davi, Kyle Stefanski, Dean Miroshnikov, Darren Weiss, Omer Hazan	
M A R C H	21	Road House	Amazon Prime Video / Metro-Goldwyn-Mayer / Silver Pictures	Doug Liman (director); Anthony Bagarozzi, Chuck Mondry (screenplay); Jake Gyllenhaal, Daniela Melchior, Billy Magnussen, Jessica Williams, Darren Barnet, Arturo Castro, J.D. Pardo, Conor McGregor	
M A R C H	21	Earlybird	Good Deed Entertainment	Martin Kaszubowski (director/screenplay); Joshua Koopman, Chloe Skoczen, Mark Fearon, Meredith Johnston, Julie Pope	
M A R C H	22	Ghostbusters: Frozen Empire	Columbia Pictures / Ghost Corps	Gil Kenan (director/screenplay); Jason Reitman (screenplay); Paul Rudd, Carrie Coon, Finn Wolfhard, Mckenna Grace, Kumail Nanjiani, Patton Oswalt, Celeste O'Connor, Logan Kim, Emily Alyn Lind, James Acaster, Bill Murray, Dan Aykroyd, Ernie Hudson, Annie Potts, William Atherton	
M A R C H	22	Immaculate	Neon / Black Bear Pictures	Michael Mohan (director); Andrew Lobel (screenplay); Sydney Sweeney, Álvaro Morte, Benedetta Porcaroli, Dora Romano, Giorgio Colangeli, Simona Tabasco	
M A R C H	22	Late Night with the Devil	IFC Films / Shudder / Image Nation / Cinetic Media / AGC Studios	Colin and Cameron Cairnes (directors/screenplay); David Dastmalchian, Laura Gordon, Ian Bliss, Fayssal Bazzi, Ingrid Torelli, Rhys Auteri, Georgina Haig, Josh Quong Tart	
M A R C H	22	Sleeping Dogs	The Avenue / Nickel City Productions / Highland Film Group	Adam Cooper (director/screenplay); Bill Collage (screenplay); Russell Crowe, Karen Gillan, Marton Csokas, Thomas M. Wright, Harry Greenwood, Tommy Flanagan	
M A R C H	22	The Casagrandes Movie	Netflix / Nickelodeon Animation Studio	Miguel Puga (director); Tony Gama-Lobo, Rebecca May, Lalo Alcaraz, Rosemary Contreras (screenplay); Izabella Alvarez, Carlos PenaVega, Sumalee Montano, Sonia Manzano, Ruben Garfias, Carlos Alazraqui, Roxana Ortega, Alexa PenaVega, Jared Kozak, Alex Cazares, Cristina Milizia, Paulina Chávez, Angélica Aragón, Kate del Castillo, Cristo Fernández, Dee Bradley Baker	
M A R C H	22	Peter Five Eight	Invincible Entertainment	Michael Zaiko Hall (director/screenplay); Kevin Spacey, Jet Jandreau, Rebecca De Mornay, Jake Weber	
M A R C H	22	Riddle of Fire	Vinegar Syndrome / Yellow Veil Pictures	Weston Razooli (director/screenplay); Lio Tipton, Charles Halford, Danielle Hoetmer, Lorelei Olivia Mote, Austin Archer, Charlie Stover	
M A R C H	22	Free Time	Cartilage Films	Ryan Martin Brown (director/screenplay); Colin Burgess, Rajat Suresh, Holmes, James Webb, Eric Yates, Jessie Pinnick, Rebecca Bulnes	
M A R C H	26	Easter Bloody Easter	WallyBird Productions	Diane Foster (director); Allison Lobel (screenplay); Miles Cooper, Diane Foster, Kelly Grant, Allison Lobel, Zuri Starks, D'Andre Noiré	
M A R C H	29	Godzilla x Kong: The New Empire	Warner Bros. Pictures / Legendary Pictures	Adam Wingard (director); Terry Rossio, Simon Barrett, Jeremy Slater (screenplay); Rebecca Hall, Brian Tyree Henry, Dan Stevens, Kaylee Hottle, Alex Ferns, Fala Chen	
M A R C H	29	Asphalt City	Roadside Attractions / Vertical Entertainment / FilmNation Entertainment	Jean-Stéphane Sauvaire (director); Ryan King, Ben Mac Brown (screenplay); Tye Sheridan, Sean Penn, Katherine Waterston, Michael Pitt, Mike Tyson, Raquel Nave, Kali Reis	
M A R C H	29	The Listener	Vertical Entertainment	Steve Buscemi (director); Alessandro Camon (screenwriter); Tessa Thompson	
M A R C H	29	Lousy Carter	Magnolia Pictures	Bob Byington (director/screenplay); David Krumholtz, Martin Starr, Olivia Thirlby, Jocelyn DeBoer, Trieste Kelly Dunn, Stephen Root, Macon Blair	

== April–June ==
Opening		Title	Company credits	Cast and crew	Ref.
A P R I L	4	Música	Amazon MGM Studios / Wonderland Sound and Vision	Rudy Mancuso (director/screenplay); Dan Lagana (screenplay); Rudy Mancuso, Camila Mendes, J.B. Smoove, Francesca Reale, Maria Mancuso	
A P R I L	5	The First Omen	20th Century Studios	Arkasha Stevenson (director/screenplay); Tim Smith, Keith Thomas (screenplay); Nell Tiger Free, Tawfeek Barhom, Sônia Braga, Ralph Ineson, Bill Nighy, Charles Dance	
A P R I L	5	Monkey Man	Universal Pictures / Bron Studios / Thunder Road Films / Monkeypaw Productions	Dev Patel (director/screenplay); Paul Angunawela, John Collee (screenplay); Dev Patel, Sharlto Copley, Pitobash Tripathy, Vipin Sharma, Sikandar Kher, Adithi Kalkunte, Sobhita Dhulipala, Ashwini Kalsekar, Makarand Deshpande, Jatin Malik, Zakir Hussain	
A P R I L	5	The Greatest Hits	Searchlight Pictures / Hulu	Ned Benson (director/screenplay); Lucy Boynton, Justin H. Min, David Corenswet, Austin Crute, Retta	
A P R I L	5	Parachute	Vertical Entertainment	Brittany Snow (director/screenplay); Becca Gleason (screenplay); Courtney Eaton, Thomas Mann, Scott Mescudi, Francesca Reale, Gina Rodriguez, Joel McHale, Kathryn Gallagher, Dave Bautista, Chrissie Fit, Lukas Gage, Kelley Jakle, Jennifer Westfeldt, Bunny Gibson	
A P R I L	5	Strictly Confidential	Lionsgate	Damian Hurley (director/screenplay); Elizabeth Hurley, Georgia Lock, Lauren McQueen, Freddie Thorp, Genevieve Gaunt, Pear Chiravara, Max Parker, Llyrio Boateng	
A P R I L	5	A Bit of Light	Quiver Distribution / ICM Partners	Stephen Moyer (director); Rebecca Callard (screenplay); Anna Paquin, Ray Winstone, Pippa Bennett-Warner, Youssef Kerkour	
A P R I L	5	The People's Joker	Altered Innocence / Haunted Gay Ride Productions	Vera Drew (director/screenplay); Bri LeRose (screenplay); Vera Drew, Lynn Downey, Griffin Kramer, Kane Distler, Nathan Faustyn, Phil Braun, David Liebe Hart, Scott Aukerman, Tim Heidecker, Maria Bamford, Bob Odenkirk	
A P R I L	5	Housekeeping for Beginners	Focus Features / Tango Entertainment	Goran Stolevski (director/screenplay); Anamaria Marinca, Alina Șerban, Samson Selim, Vladimir Tintor	
A P R I L	5	Model House	Shout! Studios / Rebellium Films	Derek Pike (director/screenplay); Scout Taylor-Compton, Ryan Merriman, Chris Zylka, Lexi Atkins, Randy Wayne	
A P R I L	12	Civil War	A24 / DNA Films / IPR.VC	Alex Garland (director/screenplay); Kirsten Dunst, Wagner Moura, Cailee Spaeny, Stephen McKinley Henderson, Sonoya Mizuno, Nick Offerman, Jesse Plemons	
A P R I L	12	Rebel Moon – Part Two: The Scargiver	Netflix / The Stone Quarry	Zack Snyder (director); Kurt Johnstad, Shay Hatten (screenplay); Sofia Boutella, Djimon Hounsou, Ed Skrein, Michiel Huisman, Doona Bae, Ray Fisher, Staz Nair, Fra Fee, Elise Duffy, Charlotte Maggi, Stuart Martin, Cary Elwes, Anthony Hopkins	
A P R I L	12	Damaged	Lionsgate / Signature Entertainment	Terry McDonough (director); Koji Steven Sakai, Gianni Capaldi, Paul Aniello (screenplay); Samuel L. Jackson, Vincent Cassel, Gianni Capaldi, Kate Dickie, John Hannah, Mark Holden	
A P R I L	12	The Absence of Eden	Roadside Attractions / Vertical Entertainment / Ingenious Media	Marco Perego (director/screenplay); Rick Rapoza (screenplay); Zoe Saldaña, Garrett Hedlund, Adria Arjona, Tom Waits	
A P R I L	12	Sasquatch Sunset	Bleecker Street / Square Peg	Nathan Zellner (director); David Zellner (director/screenplay); Riley Keough, Jesse Eisenberg	
A P R I L	12	Sweet Dreams	Paramount Pictures / The Barnum Picture Company	Lije Sarki (director/screenplay); Johnny Knoxville, Mo Amer, Theo Von, Kate Upton, Bobby Lee	
A P R I L	12	Woody Woodpecker Goes to Camp	Netflix / Universal 1440 Entertainment	Jon Rosenbaum (director); Cory Edwards, Jim Martin, Stephen Mazur (screenplay); Eric Bauza, Kevin Michael Richardson, Tom Kenny, Mary-Louise Parker, Josh Lawson	
A P R I L	12	LaRoy, Texas	Brainstorm Media / Adastra Films	Shane Atkinson (director/screenplay); John Magaro, Steve Zahn, Megan Stevenson, Matthew Del Negro, Dylan Baker	
A P R I L	12	The Long Game	Mucho Mas Releasing / Fifth Season	Julio Quintana (director/screenplay); Paco Farias, Jennifer C. Stetson (screenplay) Jay Hernandez, Julian Works, Jaina Lee Ortiz, Brett Cullen, Oscar Nuñez, Paulina Chávez, Gregory Diaz IV, José Julián, Cheech Marin, Dennis Quaid	
A P R I L	12	Arcadian	RLJE Films / Saturn Films	Ben Brewer (director); Michael Nilon (screenplay); Nicolas Cage, Jaeden Martell, Maxwell Jenkins, Sadie Soverall	
A P R I L	12	Don't Tell Mom the Babysitter's Dead	Iconic Events Releasing / BET+	Wade Allain-Marcus (director); Chuck Hayward (screenplay); Simone Joy Jones, Nicole Richie, June Squibb, Jermaine Fowler, Ms. Pat, Gus Kenworthy	
A P R I L	12	Sting	See Pictures	Kiah Roache-Turner (director/screenplay); Ryan Corr, Alyla Browne, Penelope Mitchell, Robyn Nevin, Noni Hazelhurst, Silvia Colloca, Danny Kim, Jermaine Fowler	
A P R I L	19	Abigail	Universal Pictures / Radio Silence Productions	Matt Bettinelli-Olpin, Tyler Gillett (directors); Stephen Sheilds, Guy Busick (screenplay); Melissa Barrera, Dan Stevens, Kathryn Newton, Will Catlett, Kevin Durand, Angus Cloud, Alisha Weir, Giancarlo Esposito	
A P R I L	19	The Ministry of Ungentlemanly Warfare	Lionsgate / Black Bear Pictures / Jerry Bruckheimer Films	Guy Ritchie (director/screenplay); Arash Amel, Eric Johnson, Paul Tamasy (screenplay); Henry Cavill, Eiza González, Alan Ritchson, Alex Pettyfer, Hero Fiennes Tiffin, Babs Olusanmokun, Henrique Zaga, Til Schweiger, Henry Golding, Cary Elwes	
A P R I L	19	We Grown Now	Sony Pictures Classics / Stage 6 Films / Participant	Minhal Baig (director/screenplay); Blake Cameron James, Gian Knight Ramirez, S. Epatha Merkerson, Avery Holliday, Ora Jones, Lil Rel Howery, Jurnee Smollett	
A P R I L	19	Blood for Dust	The Avenue	Rod Blackhurst (director); David Ebeltoft (screenplay); Scoot McNairy, Kit Harington, Josh Lucas, Stephen Dorff	
A P R I L	19	Stress Positions	Neon	Theda Hammel (director/screenplay); John Early, Theda Hammel, Qaher Harhash, Amy Zimmer, Faheem Ali, Rebecca F. Wright, Davidson Obennebo, John Roberts	
A P R I L	19	Hard Miles	Blue Fox Entertainment	R.J. Daniel Hanna (director/screenplay); Christian Sander (screenplay); Matthew Modine, Cynthia McWilliams, Jahking Guillory, Leslie David Baker, Sean Astin	
A P R I L	19	Hanky Panky	A Group of Ferrets / Happy Canyon Club	Nick Roth, Lindsey Haun (director); Nick Roth (screenplay); Seth Green, Jacob DeMonte-Finn, Clare Grant, Toby Brian, Lindsey Haun, Christina Laskay	
A P R I L	23	Downtown Owl	Stage 6 Films	Hamish Linklater, Lily Rabe (directors); Hamish Linklater (screenplay); Lily Rabe, Ed Harris, Vanessa Hudgens, August Blanco Rosenstein, Jack Dylan Grazer, Arianna Jaffier, Finn Wittrock, Henry Golding	
A P R I L	26	Challengers	Metro-Goldwyn-Mayer / Frenesy Film Company / Pascal Pictures	Luca Guadagnino (director); Justin Kuritzkes (screenplay); Zendaya, Josh O'Connor, Mike Faist	
A P R I L	26	Boy Kills World	Lionsgate / Roadside Attractions / Vertigo Entertainment	Mortiz Mohr (director); Tyler Burton Smith, Arend Remmers (screenplay); Bill Skarsgård, Jessica Rothe, Michelle Dockery, Brett Gelman, Isaiah Mustafa, Yayan Ruhian, Andrew Koji, Sharlto Copley, H. Jon Benjamin, Famke Janssen	
A P R I L	26	Unsung Hero	Lionsgate / Kingdom Story Company	Richard Ramsey, Joel Smallbone (directors/screenplay); Joel Smallbone, Daisy Betts, Kirrilee Berger, Jonathan Jackson, Candace Cameron Bure, Lucas Black	
A P R I L	26	Breathe	Variance Films / Thunder Road Films	Stefon Bristol (director); Doug Simon (screenplay); Jennifer Hudson, Milla Jovovich, Quvenzhané Wallis, Common, Sam Worthington	
A P R I L	26	Humane	IFC Films / Elevation Pictures / XYZ Films	Caitlin Cronenberg (director); Michael Sparaga (screenplay); Jay Baruchel, Emily Hampshire, Peter Gallagher	
A P R I L	26	The Feeling That the Time for Doing Something Has Passed	Magnolia Pictures	Joanna Arnow (director/screenplay); Scott Cohen, Babak Tafti, Joanna Arnow, Michael Cyril Creighton, Alysia Reiner, Keith Poulson, Peter Vack	
A P R I L	26	Cash Out	Saban Films	Ives (director); Dipo Oseni, Doug Richardson (screenplay); John Travolta, Kristin Davis, Lukas Haas, Quavo, Sean Astin	
A P R I L	26	Bloodline Killer	Vertical Entertainment	Ante Novakovic (director); Anthony and James Gaudioso (screenplay); Shawnee Smith, Taryn Manning, Drew Moerlein, James Gaudioso, Montanna Gillis, Kresh Novakovic, Adam Shippey, Anthony Gaudioso, Bruce Dern, Tyrese Gibson	
M A Y	2	The Idea of You	Amazon MGM Studios	Michael Showalter (director/screenplay); Jennifer Westfeldt (screenplay); Anne Hathaway, Nicholas Galitzine	
M A Y	2	Turtles All the Way Down	Max / Warner Bros. Pictures / New Line Cinema / Temple Hill Entertainment	Hannah Marks (director); Elizabeth Berger, Isaac Aptaker (screenplay); Isabela Merced, Cree Cicchino, Felix Mallard, Judy Reyes, Maliq Johnson, J. Smith-Cameron, Poorna Jagannathan, Hannah Marks	
M A Y	3	The Fall Guy	Universal Pictures / 87North Productions	David Leitch (director); Drew Pearce (screenplay); Ryan Gosling, Emily Blunt, Aaron Taylor-Johnson, Hannah Waddingham, Teresa Palmer, Stephanie Hsu, Winston Duke	
M A Y	3	Tarot	Screen Gems / Alloy Entertainment	Spenser Cohen, Anna Halberg (directors/screenplay); Harriet Slater, Adain Bradley, Avantika, Wolfgang Novogratz, Humberly González, Larsen Thompson, Jacob Batalon	
M A Y	3	Unfrosted	Netflix / Columbus 81 Productions	Jerry Seinfeld (director/screenplay); Spike Feresten, Barry Marder, Andy Robin (screenplay); Jerry Seinfeld, Melissa McCarthy, Jim Gaffigan, Max Greenfield, Hugh Grant, Amy Schumer	
M A Y	3	I Saw the TV Glow	A24 / Fruit Tree	Jane Schoenbrun (director/screenplay); Justice Smith, Brigette Lundy-Paine, Helena Howard, Lindsey Jordan, Conner O'Malley, Emma Portner, Ian Foreman, Fred Durst, Danielle Deadwyler	
M A Y	3	Wildcat	Oscilloscope Laboratories	Ethan Hawke (director/screenplay); Maya Hawke, Rafael Casal, Philip Ettinger, Cooper Hoffman, Steve Zahn, Laura Linney	
M A Y	3	Prom Dates	Hulu / LD Entertainment / Hartbeat Productions	Kim O. Nguyen (director); D.J. Mausner (screenplay); Kenny Ridwan, Julia Lester, Antonia Gentry, JT Neal, Jordan Buhat, Zión Moreno, Terry Hu, John Michael Higgins, Chelsea Handler	
M A Y	3	Chief of Station	Vertical Entertainment	Jesse V. Johnson (director); George Mahaffey (screenplay); Aaron Eckhart, Olga Kurylenko, Alex Pettyfer, Daniel Bernhardt, Chris Petrovski, Nick Moran, James Faulkner, Laetitia Eido, Nina Bergman	
M A Y	3	New Life	Brainstorm Media / XYZ Films	John Rosman (director/screenplay); Sonya Walger, Hayley Erin, Tony Amendola	
M A Y	3	Lost Soulz	Kino Lorber	Katherine Propper (director/screenplay); Sauve Sidle, Alexander Brackney, Krystall Poppin, Aaron Melloul, Malachi Mabson, Tauran Ambroise, Siyanda Stillwell	
M A Y	9	Mother of the Bride	Netflix / Living Films	Mark Waters (director); Robin Bernheim (screenplay); Brooke Shields, Miranda Cosgrove, Benjamin Bratt, Chad Michael Murray, Rachael Harris	
M A Y	10	Kingdom of the Planet of the Apes	20th Century Studios	Wes Ball (director); Josh Friedman (screenplay); Owen Teague, Freya Allan, Kevin Durand, Peter Macon, William H. Macy	
M A Y	10	Poolman	Vertical Entertainment / AGC Studios	Chris Pine (director/screenplay); Ian Gotler (screenplay); Chris Pine, Annette Bening, DeWanda Wise, Stephen Tobolowsky, Clancy Brown, John Ortiz, Ray Wise, Jennifer Jason Leigh, Danny DeVito	
M A Y	10	Not Another Church Movie	Briarcliff Entertainment	James Michael Cummings (director); Johnny Mack (director/screenplay); Kevin Daniels, Mickey Rourke, Vivica A. Fox, Kyla Pratt, Lamorne Morris, Tisha Campbell, Jasmine Guy, Jamie Foxx	
M A Y	10	The Last Stop in Yuma County	Well Go USA Entertainment	Francis Galluppi (director/screenplay); Jim Cummings, Jocelin Donahue, Richard Brake, Faizon Love, Michael Abbott Jr.	
M A Y	10	The Image of You	Republic Pictures	Jeff Fisher (director); Chris Sivertson (screenplay); Sasha Pieterse, Parker Young, Néstor Carbonell, Mira Sorvino	
M A Y	10	Gasoline Rainbow	Mubi / XTR	Bill Ross IV and Turner Ross (director/screenplay); Tony Abuerto, Micah Bunch, Nichole Dukes, Nathaly Garcia, Makai Garza	
M A Y	10	Aggro Dr1ft	EDGLRD	Harmony Korine (director/screenplay); Jordi Mollà, Travis Scott	
M A Y	17	IF	Paramount Pictures / Sunday Night Productions / Maximum Effort	John Krasinski (director/screenplay); Cailey Fleming, Ryan Reynolds, John Krasinski, Fiona Shaw, Phoebe Waller-Bridge, Louis Gossett Jr., Alan Kim, Liza Colón-Zayas, Steve Carell	
M A Y	17	The Strangers: Chapter 1	Lionsgate	Renny Harlin (director); Alan R. Cohen, Alan Freedland, Amber Loutfi (screenplay); Madelaine Petsch, Froy Gutierrez, Gabriel Basso, Ema Horvath	
M A Y	17	Back to Black	Focus Features / StudioCanal / Monumental Pictures	Sam Taylor-Johnson (director); Matt Greenhalgh (screenplay); Marisa Abela, Jack O'Connell, Eddie Marsan, Lesley Manville	
M A Y	17	Thelma the Unicorn	Netflix Animation / Scholastic Entertainment / Netflix Studios	Jared Hess, Lynn Wang (directors); Jared and Jerusha Hess (screenplay); Brittany Howard, Will Forte, Jemaine Clement, Edi Patterson, Fred Armisen, Zach Galifianakis, Jon Heder	
M A Y	17	Babes	Neon / FilmNation Entertainment	Pamela Adlon (director); Ilana Glazer, Josh Rabinowitz (screenplay); Ilana Glazer, Michelle Buteau, John Carroll Lynch, Hasan Minhaj	
M A Y	17	You Can't Run Forever	Lionsgate / Voltage Pictures	Michelle Schumacher (director/screenplay); Carolyn Carpenter (screenplay); J. K. Simmons, Allen Leech, Fernanda Urrejola, Isabelle Anaya, Nathan Vincenti	
M A Y	17	The American	Vertical / Anonymous Content	James Napier Robertson (director/screenplay); Talia Ryder, Diane Kruger, Oleg Ivenko, Natasha Alderslade, Natalia Osipova, Charlotte Ubben, Borys Szyc, Tomasz Kot, Karolina Gruszka, Martin Hugh Henley, Artur Shesterikov	
M A Y	21	Darkness of Man	Saban Films	James Cullen Bressack (director/screenplay); Alethea Hnatko-Cho (screenplay); Jean-Claude Van Damme, Kristanna Loken, Emerson Min, Spencer Breslin, Sticky Fingaz, Shannen Doherty	
M A Y	21	Dead Wrong	Mill Creek Entertainment	Rick Bieber (director/screenplay); Kenneth Clark (screenplay); Derek Smith, Katrina Bowden, Rob Schneider, Cress Williams	
M A Y	24	Furiosa: A Mad Max Saga	Warner Bros. Pictures / Kennedy Miller Mitchell	George Miller (director/screenplay); Nico Lathouris (screenplay); Anya Taylor-Joy, Chris Hemsworth, Tom Burke, Alyla Browne	
M A Y	24	The Garfield Movie	Columbia Pictures / Alcon Entertainment / Prime Focus / One Cool Group / Wayfarer Studios / Stage 6 Films	Mark Dindal (director); Paul A. Kaplan, Mark Torgove, David Reynolds (screenplay); Chris Pratt, Samuel L. Jackson, Hannah Waddingham, Ving Rhames, Nicholas Hoult, Cecily Strong, Harvey Guillén, Brett Goldstein, Bowen Yang, Snoop Dogg	
M A Y	24	Atlas	Netflix / Nuyorican Productions / Berlanti-Schechter Films	Brad Peyton (director); Leo Sardarian, Aron Eli Coleite (screenplay); Jennifer Lopez, Simu Liu, Sterling K. Brown, Mark Strong	
M A Y	24	Hit Man	Netflix / Aggregate Films / AGC Studios	Richard Linklater (director/screenplay); Glen Powell (screenplay); Glen Powell, Adria Arjona, Austin Amelio, Retta	
M A Y	24	Sight	Angel Studios	Andrew Hyatt (director/screenplay); John Duigan, Buzz McLaughlin (screenplay); Terry Chen, Greg Kinnear, Danni Wang, Raymond Ma, Bennet Wang, Jayden Zhang, Wai Ching Ho, Fionnula Flanagan	
M A Y	24	The Keeper	Lama Entertainment	Angus Benfield (director); Todd Tavolazzi (screenplay); Angus Benfield, Haley Babula, Michael Maclane, Nicolas Asad, Andrew Ferguson, Kameron Whitaker, Lance Bonza	
M A Y	28	The Legend of Catclaws Mountain	Lionsgate Home Entertainment	Ritchie Greer (director/screenplay); Bob Lee Dysinger (screenplay); Hayden Hishaw, James Duval, Robert Davi, Dee Wallace, Ilia Volok, Ricco Ross	
M A Y	31	Young Woman and the Sea	Walt Disney Pictures / Jerry Bruckheimer Films	Joachim Rønning (director); Jeff Nathanson (screenplay); Daisy Ridley, Tilda Cobham-Hervey, Stephen Graham, Kim Bodnia, Christopher Eccleston, Glenn Fleshler	
M A Y	31	Ezra	Bleecker Street / Wayfarer Studios	Tony Goldwyn (director); Tony Spiridakis (screenplay); Bobby Cannavale, Rose Byrne, Vera Farmiga, Whoopi Goldberg, Rainn Wilson, Tony Goldwyn, William A. Fitzgerald, Robert De Niro	
M A Y	31	Summer Camp	Roadside Attractions	Castille Landon (director/screenplay); Diane Keaton, Kathy Bates, Alfre Woodard, Josh Peck, Eugene Levy, Beverly D'Angelo, Dennis Haysbert	
M A Y	31	The Young Wife	Republic Pictures / FilmNation Entertainment	Tayarisha Poe (director/screenplay); Kiersey Clemons, Leon Bridges, Kelly Marie Tran, Michaela Watkins, Aya Cash, Sandy Honig, Brandon Micheal Hall, Lukita Maxwell, Sheryl Lee Ralph, Judith Light	
M A Y	31	The Great Lillian Hall	HBO Films / Max	Michael Cristofer (director); Elisabeth Seldes Annacone (screenplay); Jessica Lange, Kathy Bates, Lily Rabe, Jesse Williams, Pierce Brosnan	
M A Y	31	Shadow Land	Paramount Pictures	James Bamford (director); Ian Corson (screenplay); Jon Voight, Marton Csokas, Rhona Mitra, Philip Winchester, Sean Maguire	
M A Y	31	Backspot	XYZ Films	D. W. Waterson (director); Joanne Sarazen (screenplay); Devery Jacobs, Evan Rachel Wood, Kudakwashe Rutendo, Thomas Antony Olajide, Oluniké Adeliyi, Wendy Crewson, Shannyn Sossamon	
M A Y	31	What You Wish For	Magnolia Pictures	Nicholas Tomnay (director/screenplay); Nick Stahl, Tamsin Topolski, Randy Vasquez, Penelope Mitchell, Juan Carlos Messier, Brian Groh	
M A Y	31	Protocol-7	Abramorama	Andrew Wakefield (director/screenplay); Terry Rossio (screenplay); Rachel G. Whittle, Matthew Marsden, Josh Murray, R. Brandon Johnson, Harrison Tipping, Eric Roberts, Alec Rayme, Emmy Robbin	
M A Y	31	Deer Camp '86	Panoramic Pictures	L. Van Dyke Siboutszen (director); Bo Hansen, Riley Taurus (screenplay); Noah LaLonde, Jay J. Bidwell, Arthur Cartwright, Brian Michael Raetz, Josh Dominguez, David Lautman	
J U N E	5	Boneyard	Lionsgate	Asif Akbar (director/screenplay); Vincent E. McDaniel, Hank Byrd, Koji Steven Sakai (screenplay); Mel Gibson, Curtis Jackson, Brian Van Holt, Nora Zehetner, Gabrielle Haugh	
J U N E	6	Am I OK?	Max / Warner Bros. Pictures / Gloria Sanchez Productions	Tig Notaro, Stephanie Allynne (directors); Lauren Pomerantz (screenplay); Dakota Johnson, Sonoya Mizuno, Jermaine Fowler, Kiersey Clemons, Molly Gordon, June Diane Raphael, Tig Notaro, Sean Hayes	
J U N E	7	Bad Boys: Ride or Die	Columbia Pictures / Jerry Bruckheimer Films / Westbrook Studios	Adil and Bilall (directors); Chris Bremner, Will Beall (screenplay); Will Smith, Martin Lawrence, Vanessa Hudgens, Alexander Ludwig, Paola Núñez, Eric Dane, Ioan Gruffudd, Jacob Scipio, Melanie Liburd, Tasha Smith, Tiffany Haddish, Joe Pantoliano	
J U N E	7	The Watchers	Warner Bros. Pictures / New Line Cinema / Blinding Edge Pictures	Ishana Night Shyamalan (director/screenplay); Dakota Fanning, Georgina Campbell, Olwen Fouéré, Oliver Finnegan	
J U N E	7	Tuesday	A24 / BBC Film / BFI / Cinereach	Daina O. Pusić (director/screenplay); Julia Louis-Dreyfus, Lola Petticrew, Leah Harvey, Arinzé Kene	
J U N E	7	Longing	Lionsgate / Scythia Films	Savi Gabizon (director/screenplay); Richard Gere, Diane Kruger, Suzanne Clément, Marnie McPhail, Stuart Hughes	
J U N E	7	Late Bloomers	Vertical	Lisa Steen (directors); Anna Greenfield (screenplay); Karen Gillan, Margaret Sophie Stein, Jermaine Fowler, Talia Balsam, Kevin Nealon	
J U N E	7	Trim Season	Blue Harbor Entertainment	Ariel Vida (director); David Blair, Sean E. DeMott, Cullen Poythress (screenplay); Bethlehem Million, Alex Essoe, Ally Ioannides, Bex Taylor-Klaus, Jane Badler, Juliette Kenn De Balinthazy, Ryan Donowho, Cory Hart, Marc Senter	
J U N E	7	Life After Fighting	Vertical	Bren Foster (director/screenplay); Alex Faulkner, Luke Ford, Cassie Howarth, Annabelle Stephenson, Jake Ryan	
J U N E	11	Killer of Men	Quiver Distribution	Tzvi (director/screenplay); Jon Peterson, Stacie Brown, Paquito G. Myers, Noah Forrest, Sergio Beltran	
J U N E	14	Inside Out 2	Walt Disney Pictures / Pixar Animation Studios	Kelsey Mann (director); Meg LeFauve, Dave Holstein (screenplay); Amy Poehler, Maya Hawke, Kensington Tallman, Liza Lapira, Tony Hale, Lewis Black, Phyllis Smith, Ayo Edebiri, Lilimar, Grace Lu, Sumayyah Nuriddin-Green, Adèle Exarchopoulos, Diane Lane, Kyle MacLachlan, Paul Walter Hauser	
J U N E	14	Ultraman: Rising	Netflix / Netflix Animation / Tsuburaya Productions	Shannon Tindle (director/screenplay); Marc Haimes (screenplay); Christopher Sean, Gedde Watanabe, Tamlyn Tomita, Keone Young, Julia Harriman	
J U N E	14	Reverse the Curse	Vertical	David Duchovny (director/screenplay); David Duchovny, Logan Marshall-Green, Stephanie Beatriz, Evan Handler, Pamela Adlon, Jason Beghe, Daphne Rubin-Vega	
J U N E	14	The Present	Gravitas Ventures / AGC Studios	Christian Ditter (director); Jay Martel (screenplay); Isla Fisher, Greg Kinnear	
J U N E	14	Ghostlight	IFC Films / Sapan Studio	Alex Thompson, Kelly O'Sullivan (directors); Kelly O'Sullivan (screenplay); Keith Kupferer, Tara Mallen, Katherine Mallen Kupferer, Dolly de Leon	
J U N E	14	Fresh Kills	Quiver Distribution	Jennifer Esposito (director/screenplay); Jennifer Esposito, Emily Bader, Odessa A'zion, Domenick Lombardozzi, Annabella Sciorra	
J U N E	14	Ride	Well Go USA Entertainment	Jake Allyn (director/screenplay); Josh Plasse (screenplay); Jake Allyn, C. Thomas Howell, John Plasse, Annabeth Gish, Patrick Murney, Scott Reeves, Forrie J. Smith, Laci Kaye Booth	
J U N E	14	Latency	Lionsgate	James Croke (director/screenplay); Sasha Luss, Alexis Ren	
J U N E	21	The Bikeriders	Focus Features / Regency Enterprises	Jeff Nichols (director/screenplay); Jodie Comer, Austin Butler, Tom Hardy, Michael Shannon, Mike Faist, Boyd Holbrook, Damon Herriman, Beau Knapp, Emory Cohen, Karl Glusman, Toby Wallace, Norman Reedus	
J U N E	21	Kinds of Kindness	Searchlight Pictures / Film4 / Element Pictures	Yorgos Lanthimos (director/screenplay); Efthimis Filippou (screenplay); Emma Stone, Jesse Plemons, Willem Dafoe, Margaret Qualley, Hong Chau, Joe Alwyn, Mamoudou Athie, Hunter Schafer	
J U N E	21	The Exorcism	Vertical / Miramax / Outerbanks Entertainment	M. A. Fortin, Joshua John Miller (directors/screenplay); Russell Crowe, Ryan Simpkins, Sam Worthington, Chloe Bailey, Adam Goldberg, David Hyde Pierce	
J U N E	21	Fancy Dance	Apple TV+ / Significant Productions	Erica Tremblay (director/screenplay); Lily Gladstone, Isabel Deroy-Olson, Shea Whigham, Audrey Wasilewski	
J U N E	21	Trigger Warning	Netflix / Thunder Road Films	Mouly Surya (director); Halley Gross, John Olson, John Brancato (screenplay); Jessica Alba, Anthony Michael Hall	
J U N E	21	Janet Planet	A24 / BBC Film	Annie Baker (director/screenplay); Julianne Nicholson, Zoe Ziegler, Elias Koteas, Will Patton, Sophie Okonedo	
J U N E	21	Blackwater Lane	Lionsgate / Grindstone Entertainment Group	Jeff Celentano (director); Elizabeth Fowler (screenplay); Edward Baker-Duly, Pandora Clifford, Maggie Grace, Minka Kelly, Dermot Mulroney	
J U N E	21	Thelma	Magnolia Pictures	Josh Margolin (director/screenplay); June Squibb, Fred Hechinger, Richard Roundtree, Clark Gregg, Parker Posey, Malcolm McDowell	
J U N E	21	Chestnut	Utopia	Jac Cron (director/screenplay); Natalia Dyer, Rachel Keller, Danny Ramirez, Chella Man	
J U N E	21	Agent Recon	Quiver Distribution	Derek Ting (director/screenplay); Derek Ting, Marc Singer, Chuck Norris, Sylvia Kwan, Jason Scott Jenkins, Matthew Ryan Burnett, Nikki Leigh, Christopher Showerman	
J U N E	24	Arena Wars	Paramount+	Brandon Slagle (director); Michael Mahal, Sonny Mahal (screenplay); Eric Roberts, Michael Madsen, Robert LaSardo	
J U N E	28	A Quiet Place: Day One	Paramount Pictures / Platinum Dunes / Sunday Night Productions	Michael Sarnoski (director/screenplay); Lupita Nyong'o, Joseph Quinn, Alex Wolff, Djimon Hounsou	
J U N E	28	Horizon: An American Saga – Chapter 1	Warner Bros. Pictures / New Line Cinema	Kevin Costner (director/screenplay); Jon Baird (screenplay); Kevin Costner, Sienna Miller, Sam Worthington, Jena Malone, Abbey Lee, Michael Rooker, Danny Huston, Luke Wilson, Isabelle Fuhrman, Jeff Fahey, Will Patton, Tatanka Means, Owen Crow Shoe, Ella Hunt, Jamie Campbell Bower	
J U N E	28	A Family Affair	Netflix / Roth/Kirschenbaum Films	Richard LaGravenese (director); Carrie Solomon (screenplay); Nicole Kidman, Zac Efron, Joey King, Liza Koshy, Kathy Bates, Shirley MacLaine	
J U N E	28	Reunion	Republic Pictures / Spyglass Media Group / Lionsgate	Chris Nelson (director); Jake Emanuel, Willie Block (screenplay); Lil Rel Howery, Billy Magnussen, Jillian Bell, Jamie Chung, Michael Hitchcock, Nina Dobrev, Chace Crawford	
J U N E	28	Daddio	Sony Pictures Classics	Christy Hall (director/screenplay); Dakota Johnson, Sean Penn	
J U N E	28	A Sacrifice	Vertical / Scott Free Productions	Jordan Scott (director/screenplay); Eric Bana, Sylvia Hoeks, Sadie Sink	
J U N E	28	June Zero	Cohen Media Group	Jake Paltrow (director/screenplay); Koby Adere, Adam Gabay, Tzahi Grad	
J U N E	28	Midas	Entertainment Squad	TJ Noel-Sullivan (director/screenplay); Laquan Copeland, Preet Kaur, Federico Parra, Lucy Powers, Bob Gallagher, Erik Bloomquist	
J U N E	28	Family Portrait	Conjuring Productions / Insufficient Funds	Lucy Kerr (director/screenplay); Rob Rice, Karlis Bergs (screenplay); Rachel Alig, Miriam Spumpkin, Deragh Campbell	
J U N E	28	Chronicles of a Wandering Saint	Hope Runs High	Tomás Gómez Bustillo (director/screenplay); Mónica Villa, Horacio Marassi	

== July–September ==
Opening		Title	Company credits	Cast and crew	Ref.
J U L Y	2	Little Deaths	Entertainment Squad	Brian Follmer (director/screenplay); Kerri Lee Romeo, Adam Leotta, Brian Follmer, Nicole Alibayof	
J U L Y	3	Despicable Me 4	Universal Pictures / Illumination	Chris Renaud (director); Mike White, Ken Daurio (screenplay); Steve Carell, Kristen Wiig, Joey King, Miranda Cosgrove, Stephen Colbert, Sofia Vergara, Chloe Fineman, Steve Coogan, Will Ferrell	
J U L Y	3	Beverly Hills Cop: Axel F	Netflix / Don Simpson/Jerry Bruckheimer Films	Mark Molloy (director); Will Beall, Tom Gormican, Kevin Etten (screenplay); Eddie Murphy, Joseph Gordon-Levitt, Taylour Paige, Judge Reinhold, John Ashton, Paul Reiser, Bronson Pinchot, Kevin Bacon	
J U L Y	3	The Secret Art of Human Flight	Level 33 Entertainment	H.P. Mendoza (director); Jesse Orenshein (screenplay); Grant Rosenmeyer, Paul Raci, Lucy DeVito, Nican Robinson, Reina Hardesty, Rosa Arredondo, Maggie Grace, Sendhil Ramamurthy	
J U L Y	4	Sound of Hope: The Story of Possum Trot	Angel Studios / DailyWire+	Joshua Weigel (director/screenplay); Rebekah Weigel (screenplay); Elizabeth Mitchell, Demetrius Grosse, Carlos Aviles, Nika King, Sarah Hudson	
J U L Y	4	Space Cadet	Amazon MGM Studios	Liz W. Garcia (director/screenplay); Emma Roberts, Gabrielle Union, Tom Hopper, Poppy Liu	
J U L Y	5	MaXXXine	A24	Ti West (director/screenplay); Mia Goth, Elizabeth Debicki, Moses Sumney, Michelle Monaghan, Bobby Cannavale, Halsey, Lily Collins, Giancarlo Esposito, Kevin Bacon	
J U L Y	5	Mother, Couch	Film Movement / Memory / Lyrical Media / Film i Väst	Niclas Larsson (director/screenplay); Ewan McGregor, Rhys Ifans, Taylor Russell, Lara Flynn Boyle, Lake Bell, F. Murray Abraham, Ellen Burstyn	
J U L Y	5	Murder Company	Maverick Entertainment Group / Complex Corp	Shane Dax Taylor (director); Jesse Mittelstadt (screenplay); William Moseley, Pooch Hall, Gilles Marini, Joe Anderson, Kelsey Grammer	
J U L Y	5	The Real Bros of Simi Valley: High School Reunion	Roku	Jimmy Tatro (director/screenplay); Christian Pierce (screenplay); Jimmy Tatro, Nick Colletti, Tanner Petulla, Cody Ko, Peter Gilroy, Colleen Donovan, Madeline Whitby, Monica Joy Sherer, Monette Moio, Christian Pierce, Tony Hawk, Shaun White, Zoey Deutch, Tyler Posey, Retta, Tre Hale, Rob Riggle	
J U L Y	5	Dead Whisper	Vertical	Conor Soucy (director/screenplay); Colin Charles Dale (screenplay); Samuel Dunning, Tana Sirois, Samantha Hill, Codey Gillum, Chris Goodwin, Dhane Ross, Hester Wilkinson, Bruce Winant	
J U L Y	9	Exposure	Gravitas Ventures	Peter Cannon (director/screenplay); Douglas Smith, Margo Harshman, Abraham Rodriguez, Ryan Whitney, Alex Feldman, Kevin McCorkle, Gary Poux, Chanel Minnifield	
J U L Y	9	Angels Fallen: Warriors of Peace	Uncork'd Entertainment	Ali Zamani (director); Chris Kato (screenplay); Denise Richards, Cuba Gooding Jr., Randy Couture, William McNamara, Arifin Putra	
J U L Y	11	Divorce in the Black	Amazon Prime Video / Tyler Perry Studios	Tyler Perry (director/screenplay); Meagan Good, Cory Hardrict, Joseph Lee Anderson, Taylor Polidore, Shannon Wallace, Richard Lawson, Debbi Morgan	
J U L Y	12	Fly Me to the Moon	Columbia Pictures / Apple Studios	Greg Berlanti (director); Rose Gilroy (screenplay); Scarlett Johansson, Channing Tatum, Jim Rash, Anna Garcia, Donald Elise Watkins, Noah Robbins, Colin Woodell, Christian Zuber, Nick Dillenburg, Ray Romano, Woody Harrelson	
J U L Y	12	Longlegs	Neon / Saturn Films	Osgood Perkins (director/screenplay); Maika Monroe, Nicolas Cage, Blair Underwood, Alicia Witt, Michelle Choi-Lee, Dakota Daulby, Kiernan Shipka	
J U L Y	12	Sing Sing	A24 / Black Bear Pictures	Greg Kwedar (director/screenplay); Clint Bentley (screenplay); Colman Domingo, Clarence "Divine Eye" Maclin, Sean San José, Paul Raci	
J U L Y	12	Dandelion	IFC Films	Nicole Riegel (director/screenplay); KiKi Layne, Thomas Doherty, Melanie Nicholls-King	
J U L Y	12	Touch	Focus Features / RVK Studios	Baltasar Kormákur (director/screenplay); Ólafur Jóhann Ólafsson (screenplay); Egill Ólafsson, Kōki	
J U L Y	12	The Inheritance	Vertical	Alejandro Brugués (director); Chris LaMont, Joe Russo (screenplay); Bob Gunton, Peyton List, Briana Middleton, Rachel Nichols, Austin Stowell, David Walton	
J U L Y	12	National Anthem	Variance Films	Luke Gilford (director/screenplay); David Largman Murray, Kevin Best (screenplay); Charlie Plummer, Eve Lindley, Mason Alexander Park, Rene Rosado, Robyn Lively	
J U L Y	12	Because We're Family	Buffalo 8 Entertainment	Christine Nyhart Kaplan (director); Angela Stern (director/screenplay); C. Thomas Howell, Josh Drennen, June Eisler, Angela Stern, Christine Nyhart Kaplan	
J U L Y	14	Lost on a Mountain in Maine	Balboa Productions / Mom & Dad Production	Andrew Boodhoo Kightlinger (director); Luke David Blumm	
J U L Y	18	My Spy: The Eternal City	Amazon MGM Studios / STXfilms / MWM Studios	Peter Segal (director/screenplay); Erich Hoeber, Jon Hoeber (screenplay); Dave Bautista, Chloe Coleman, Kristen Schaal, Flula Borg, Craig Robinson, Anna Faris, Ken Jeong	
J U L Y	19	Twisters	Universal Pictures / Warner Bros. Pictures / Amblin Entertainment	Lee Isaac Chung (director); Mark L. Smith (screenplay); Daisy Edgar-Jones, Glen Powell, Anthony Ramos, Brandon Perea, Maura Tierney, Sasha Lane	
J U L Y	19	Find Me Falling	Netflix	Stelana Kliris (director/screenplay); Harry Connick Jr., Ali Fumiko Whitney	
J U L Y	19	Clear Cut	Lionsgate / Grindstone Entertainment Group	Brian Skiba (director); Joe Perruccio (screenplay); Alec Baldwin, Stephen Dorff, Clive Standen, Lucy Martin, Jesse Metcalfe, Tom Welling	
J U L Y	19	Widow Clicquot	Vertical	Thomas Napper (director); Erin Dignam, Christopher Monger (screenplay); Haley Bennett, Tom Sturridge, Sam Riley, Anson Boom, Leo Suter, Ben Miles, Natasha O'Keeffe	
J U L Y	19	Clawfoot	Vertical	Michael Day (director); April Wolfe (screenplay); Francesca Eastwood, Milo Gibson, Olivia Culpo, Néstor Carbonell, Oliver Cooper	
J U L Y	19	The Abandon	Lionsgate	Dwain Worrell (director/screenplay); Jonathan Rosenthal, Tamara Perry	
J U L Y	19	Oddity	IFC Films / Shudder	Damian Mc Carthy (director/screenplay); Gwilym Lee, Carolyn Bracken, Tadhg Murphy, Steve Wall	
J U L Y	19	Spread	Tubi	Ellie Kanner (director); Buffy Charlet (screenplay); Elizabeth Gillies, Harvey Keitel, Teri Polo, Diedrich Bader, Diora Baird, Tim Rozon, April Telek, Blake Harrison, Bryan Craig	
J U L Y	20	Lumina	Goldove / Luminamovie LLC	Gino J.H. McKoy (director/screenplay); Eric Roberts, Ken Lawson, Emily Hall, Rupert Lazarus, Eleanor Williams, Andrea Tividar, Sidney Nicole Rogers	
J U L Y	23	The Good Half	Utopia	Robert Schwartzman (director); Brett Ryland (screenplay); Nick Jonas, Brittany Snow, David Arquette, Alexandra Shipp, Matt Walsh, Elisabeth Shue	
J U L Y	26	Deadpool & Wolverine	Marvel Studios / Maximum Effort / 21 Laps Entertainment	Shawn Levy (director/screenplay); Ryan Reynolds, Rhett Reese, Paul Wernick, Zeb Wells (screenplay); Ryan Reynolds, Hugh Jackman, Emma Corrin, Morena Baccarin, Rob Delaney, Leslie Uggams, Aaron Stanford, Matthew Macfadyen	
J U L Y	26	The Fabulous Four	Bleecker Street	Jocelyn Moorhouse (director/screenplay); Jenna Milly, Ann Marie Allison (screenplay); Susan Sarandon, Bette Midler, Megan Mullally, Sheryl Lee Ralph, Bruce Greenwood, Timothy V. Murphy, Michael Bolton	
J U L Y	26	Mothers' Instinct	Neon / Freckle Films / Mosaic	Benoît Delhomme (director); Sarah Conradt (screenplay); Jessica Chastain, Anne Hathaway, Anders Danielsen Lie, Josh Charles	
J U L Y	26	Dìdi	Focus Features / Maiden Voyage Pictures	Sean Wang (director/screenplay); Izaac Wang, Shirley Chen, Chang Li Hua, Joan Chen	
J U L Y	26	The Girl in the Pool	Quiver Distribution	Dakota Gorman (director); Jackson Reid Williams (screenplay); Freddie Prinze Jr., Monica Potter, Kevin Pollak, Gabrielle Haugh, Angie Ayala, Brielle Barbusca, Dionysio Basco, Rickey Eugene Brown, Micah Giovanni	
J U L Y	26	Dead Sea	Vertical	Phil Volken (director/screenplay); Dean Cameron, Garrett Wareing, Isabel Gravitt, Alexander Wraith, Genneya Walton, Al Burke, Koa Tom	
J U L Y	31	The Duel	Lionsgate / Grindstone Entertainment Group	Justin Matthews, Luke Spencer Roberts (director/screenplay); Dylan Sprouse, Callan McAuliffe, Denny Love, Hart Denton, María Gabriela de Faría, Rachel Matthews, Christian McGaffney, Ronald Guttman, Patrick Warburton	
A U G U S T	2	Trap	Warner Bros. Pictures / Blinding Edge Pictures	M. Night Shyamalan (director/screenplay); Josh Hartnett, Ariel Donoghue, Saleka Shyamalan, Hayley Mills, Alison Pill	
A U G U S T	2	Harold and the Purple Crayon	Columbia Pictures / Davis Entertainment	Carlos Saldanha (director); David Guion, Michael Handelman (screenplay); Zachary Levi, Lil Rel Howery, Benjamin Bottani, Jemaine Clement, Tanya Reynolds, Alfred Molina, Zooey Deschanel	
A U G U S T	2	The Instigators	Apple TV+ / Artists Equity / Studio 8	Doug Liman (director); Chuck Maclean, Casey Affleck (screenplay); Matt Damon, Casey Affleck, Hong Chau, Michael Stuhlbarg, Paul Walter Hauser, Ving Rhames, Alfred Molina, Toby Jones, Jack Harlow, Ron Perlman	
A U G U S T	2	Saving Bikini Bottom: The Sandy Cheeks Movie	Netflix / Nickelodeon Movies / United Plankton Pictures	Liza Johnson (director); Tom Stern, Kaz (screenplay); Carolyn Lawrence, Tom Kenny, Clancy Brown, Bill Fagerbakke, Mr. Lawrence, Rodger Bumpass, Craig Robinson, Grey DeLisle, Johnny Knoxville, Ilia Isorelýs Paulino, Matty Cardarople, Wanda Sykes	
A U G U S T	2	The Firing Squad	Epoch Studios / RiverRain Productions	Timothy A. Chey (director/screenplay); James Barrington, Cuba Gooding Jr., Kevin Sorbo, Edmund Kwan, Tupua Ainu'u, Eric Roberts	
A U G U S T	2	Detained	Quiver Distribution	Felipe Mucci (director/screenplay); Jeremy Palmer (screenplay); Abbie Cornish, Laz Alonso, Moon Bloodgood, John Patrick Amedori, Justin H. Min, Breeda Wool, Silas Weir Mitchell, Josefine Lindegaard	
A U G U S T	2	Peak Season	Entertainment Squad	Steven Kanter (director); Henry Loevner (director/screenplay); Claudia Restrepo, Derrick DeBlasis, Ben Coleman, Fred Melamed, Stephanie Courtney	
A U G U S T	2	AMFAD All My Friends Are Dead	Cineverse	Marcus Dunstan (director); Josh Sims (screenplay); Jessica Sarah Flaum (screenplay); Jade Pettyjohn, JoJo Siwa, Jennifer Ens, Justin Derickson, Michaella Russell	
A U G U S T	5	Trust in Love	Gravitas Ventures	Mick Davis (director); Jimi Petulla (screenplay); Jimi Petulla, Sydney Bullock, Logan Arditty, Natasha Wilson, Eric Roberts, Tim Hazelip, Miljenko Matijevic, Robby Krieger	
A U G U S T	8	One Fast Move	Amazon MGM Studios	Kelly Blatz (director/screenplay); KJ Apa, Eric Dane, Maia Reficco, Edward James Olmos, Austin North	
A U G U S T	9	It Ends with Us	Columbia Pictures / Wayfarer Studios	Justin Baldoni (director); Christy Hall (screenplay); Blake Lively, Justin Baldoni, Jenny Slate, Hasan Minhaj, Kevin McKidd, Amy Morton, Alex Neustaedter, Isabela Ferrer, Brandon Sklenar	
A U G U S T	9	Borderlands	Lionsgate / Summit Entertainment / 2K / Gearbox Studios / Arad Productions	Eli Roth (director/screenplay); Joe Crombie (screenplay); Cate Blanchett, Kevin Hart, Jack Black, Édgar Ramírez, Ariana Greenblatt, Florian Munteanu, Janina Gavankar, Gina Gershon, Jamie Lee Curtis	
A U G U S T	9	Cuckoo	Neon	Tilman Singer (director/screenplay); Hunter Schafer, Dan Stevens, Jessica Henwick, Jan Bluthardt, Marton Csokas	
A U G U S T	9	Girl You Know It's True	Vertical / Mediawan / Voltage Pictures	Simon Verhoeven (director/screenplay); Elan Ben Ali, Tijan Njie, Matthias Schweighöfer, Graham Rogers	
A U G U S T	9	Good One	Metrograph Pictures	India Donaldson (director/screenplay); Lily Collias, James LeGros, Danny McCarthy, Sumaya Bouhbal, Valentine Black, Diana Irvine	
A U G U S T	9	Duchess	Saban Films	Neil Marshall (director/screenplay); Charlotte Kirk (screenplay); Charlotte Kirk, Philip Winchester, Colm Meaney, Hoji Fortuna, Colin Egglesfield, Stephanie Beacham, Sean Pertwee	
A U G U S T	13	Watchmen: Chapter I	Warner Bros. Animation / DC Entertainment	Brandon Vietti (director); J. Michael Straczynski (screenplay); Matthew Rhys, Katee Sackhoff, Titus Welliver, Troy Baker, Rick D. Wasserman, Adrienne Barbeau, Jeffrey Combs, Geoff Pierson, Corey Burton, John Marshall Jones, Yuri Lowenthal, Kari Wahlgren, Grey DeLisle, Kelly Hu, Max Koch, Phil LaMarr, Dwight Schultz, Jason Spisak	
A U G U S T	15	Jackpot!	Amazon MGM Studios / Roth/Kirschenbaum Films	Paul Feig (director); Rob Yescombe (screenplay); John Cena, Awkwafina, Simu Liu	
A U G U S T	16	Alien: Romulus	20th Century Studios / Scott Free Productions / Brandywine Productions	Fede Álvarez (director/screenplay); Rodo Sayagues (screenplay); Cailee Spaeny, David Jonsson, Archie Renaux, Isabela Merced, Spike Fearn, Aileen Wu	
A U G U S T	16	The Union	Netflix / Municipal Pictures	Julian Farino (director); Joe Barton, David Guggenheim (screenplay); Mark Wahlberg, Halle Berry, Adewale Akinnuoye-Agbaje, Mike Colter, Alice Lee, J. K. Simmons, Jackie Earle Haley	
A U G U S T	16	The Deliverance	Netflix	Lee Daniels (director); David Coggeshall, Elijah Bynum (screenplay); Andra Day, Glenn Close, Aunjanue Ellis-Taylor, Caleb McLaughlin, Omar Epps, Mo'Nique	
A U G U S T	16	Rob Peace	Republic Pictures / Los Angeles Media Fund / Participant / 25 Stories	Chiwetel Ejiofor (director/screenplay); Jay Will, Mary J. Blige, Chiwetel Ejiofor, Camila Cabello, Michael Kelly, Mare Winningham	
A U G U S T	16	Skincare	IFC Films	Austin Peters (director/screenplay); Sam Freilich, Deering Regan (screenplay); Elizabeth Banks, Lewis Pullman, Michaela Jaé Rodriguez, Luis Gerardo Méndez, Nathan Fillion	
A U G U S T	16	Gunner	Highland Film Group	Dimitri Logothetis (director); Gary Scott Thompson (screenplay); Luke Hemsworth, Morgan Freeman, Joseph Baena	
A U G U S T	16	Crescent City	Lionsgate / Grindstone Entertainment Group	R.J. Collins (director); Rich Ronat (screenplay); Alec Baldwin, Esai Morales, Terrence Howard, Nicky Whelan	
A U G U S T	16	Ryan's World the Movie: Titan Universe Adventure	Falling Forward Films / PocketWatch	Albie Hecht (director); Rose Frankel (screenplay); Ryan Kaji, Shion Kaji, Loann Kaji, Emma Kaji, Kate Kaji	
A U G U S T	16	Mountains	Music Box Films	Monica Sorelle (director/screenplay); Robert Colom (screenplay); Atibon Nazaire, Sheila Anozier, Chris Renois	
A U G U S T	20	The Clean Up Crew	Saban Films	Jon Keeyes (director); Matthew Rogers (screenplay); Jonathan Rhys Meyers, Melissa Leo, Antonio Banderas, Ekaterina Baker, Laurence Kinlan, Andy Kellegher	
A U G U S T	21	Stream	Iconic Events Releasing / Fuzz on the Lens Productions	Michael Leavy (director/screenplay); Steven Della Salla, Jason Leavy, Robert Privitera (screenplay); Charles Edwin Powell, Danielle Harris, Jeffrey Combs, Dee Wallace, Tim Reid, Mark Holton, Felissa Rose, Tony Todd, Daniel Roebuck, Dave Sheridan, Terry Alexander, David Howard Thornton, Damian Maffei	
A U G U S T	23	Blink Twice	Metro-Goldwyn-Mayer / Free Association	Zoë Kravitz (director/screenplay); E.T. Feigenbaum (screenplay); Naomi Ackie, Channing Tatum, Christian Slater, Simon Rex, Adria Arjona, Kyle MacLachlan, Haley Joel Osment, Geena Davis, Alia Shawkat	
A U G U S T	23	The Crow	Lionsgate / Davis Films / 30West / FilmNation Entertainment	Rupert Sanders (director); Zach Baylin, Will Schneider (screenplay); Bill Skarsgård, FKA Twigs, Danny Huston	
A U G U S T	23	The Killer	Peacock / Universal Pictures / Atlas Entertainment	John Woo (director); Brian Helgeland, Josh Campbell, Matt Stuecken (screenplay); Nathalie Emmanuel, Omar Sy, Sam Worthington, Diana Silvers, Saïd Taghmaoui, Hugo Diego Garcia	
A U G U S T	23	The Supremes at Earl's All-You-Can-Eat	Hulu / Searchlight Pictures / Temple Hill Entertainment	Tina Mabry (director/screenplay); Cee Marcellus (screenplay); Aunjanue Ellis-Taylor, Sanaa Lathan, Uzo Aduba, Mekhi Phifer, Julian McMahon, Vondie Curtis-Hall, Russell Hornsby	
A U G U S T	23	Greedy People	Lionsgate	Potsy Ponciroli (director); Michael Vukadinovich (screenplay); Himesh Patel, Joseph Gordon-Levitt, Lily James, Tim Blake Nelson, Traci Lords, Simon Rex, Joey Lauren Adams, Uzo Aduba, Jim Gaffigan	
A U G U S T	23	Between the Temples	Sony Pictures Classics / Ley Line Entertainment	Nathan Silver (director/screenplay); C. Mason Wells (screenplay); Jason Schwartzman, Carol Kane, Dolly de Leon, Caroline Aaron, Robert Smigel, Madeline Weinstein, Matthew Shear, Lindsay Burdge, John Magary	
A U G U S T	23	The Forge	Affirm Films / Kendrick Brothers / Provident Films	Alex Kendrick (director/screenplay); Stephen Kendrick (screenplay); Cameron Arnett, Priscilla Shirer, Aspen Kennedy, Karen Abercrombie, T.C. Stallings, BJ Arnett, Ken Bevel	
A U G U S T	23	Incoming	Netflix	Dave Chernin, Josh Chernin (director/screenplay); Raphael Alejandro, Kaitlin Olson, Bobby Cannavale, Mason Thames, Scott MacArthur, Thomas Barbusca, Gattlin Griffith, Isabella Ferreira, Steele Stebbins	
A U G U S T	23	Strange Darling	Magenta Light Studios / Miramax	JT Mollner (director/screenplay); Willa Fitzgerald, Kyle Gallner, Madisen Beaty, Steven Michael Quezada, Ed Begley Jr., Barbara Hershey	
A U G U S T	23	Catching Dust	Vertical	Stuart Gatt (director/screenplay); Erin Moriarty, Dina Shihabi, Jai Courtney, Ryan Corr	
A U G U S T	23	Summer of Violence	Quiver Distribution	Nicki Micheaux (director/screenplay); Kasey Inez, Jahking Guillory, Madhulika Krishnan, Pedro Correa, Damon Gupton	
A U G U S T	23	The Becomers	Dark Star Pictures	Zach Clark (director/screenplay); Russell Mael, Isabel Alamin, Molly Plunk, Mike Lopez, Keith Kelly	
A U G U S T	23	Place of Bones	Highland Film Group / Gold Rush Entertainment / Latigo Films	Audrey Cummings (director); Richard Taylor (screenplay); Heather Graham, Tom Hopper, Corin Nemec, Brielle Robillard, Donald Cerrone	
A U G U S T	27	The Exorcism of Saint Patrick	Cranked Up Films	Quinn Armstrong (director/screenplay); Steve Pinder, Michael J. Cline, Maya Jeyam, Caitlin McWethy, Alan Tyson, Louie Kurtzman, Andrew James Myers, Erik Donley, Beau Roberts	
A U G U S T	30	Afraid	Columbia Pictures / Blumhouse Productions	Chris Weitz (director/screenplay); John Cho, Katherine Waterston, Havana Rose Liu, Lukita Maxwell, David Dastmalchian, Keith Carradine	
A U G U S T	30	1992	Lionsgate / Death Row Pictures	Ariel Vromen (director/screenplay); Sascha Penn (screenplay); Tyrese Gibson, Scott Eastwood, Ray Liotta	
A U G U S T	30	Slingshot	Bleecker Street	Mikael Håfström (director); R. Scott Adams, Nathan Parker (screenplay); Casey Affleck, Laurence Fishburne, Emily Beecham, Tomer Kapon, David Morrissey	
A U G U S T	30	The Wasp	Shout! Studios	Guillem Morales (director); Morgan Lloyd Malcolm (screenplay); Naomie Harris, Natalie Dormer	
A U G U S T	30	Reagan	ShowBiz Direct / MJM Entertainment	Sean McNamara (director); Howard Klausner, Jonas McCord (screenplay); Dennis Quaid, Penelope Ann Miller, Robert Davi, Lesley-Anne Down, Jon Voight	
A U G U S T	30	First Shift	Quiver Distribution	Uwe Boll (director/screenplay); Gino Anthony Pesi, Kristen Renton, James McMenamin, Daniel Sauli, Tamara Della Anderson, Brandi Bravo, Garry Pastore	
A U G U S T	30	You Gotta Believe	Well Go USA Entertainment	Ty Roberts (director/screenplay); Lane Garrison (screenplay); Luke Wilson, Greg Kinnear, Sarah Gadon, Lew Temple, Michael Cash, Etienne Kellici, Molly Parker	
A U G U S T	30	City of Dreams	Roadside Attractions	Mohit Ramchandani (director/screenplay); Ari Lopez, Renata Vaca, Alfredo Castro, Paulina Gaitán, Jason Patric, Diego Calva	
A U G U S T	30	Tokyo Cowboy	Purdie Distribution	Marc Marriott (director); Dave Boyle, Ayako Fujitani (screenplay); Arata Iura, Robin Weigert, Goya Robles, Ayako Fujitani, Jun Kunimura	
S E P T E M B E R	3	Wolves Against the World	Good Deed Entertainment	Quinn Armstrong (director/screenplay); Michael Kunicki, Quinn Armstrong, Jordan Mullins, Jim Azelvandre, Louie Kurtzman, Eric Six, Jacob Southwick	
S E P T E M B E R	6	Beetlejuice Beetlejuice	Warner Bros. Pictures / Plan B Entertainment / Tim Burton Productions / The Geffen Company	Tim Burton (director); Alfred Gough, Miles Millar (screenplay); Michael Keaton, Winona Ryder, Catherine O'Hara, Justin Theroux, Monica Bellucci, Jenna Ortega, Willem Dafoe	
S E P T E M B E R	6	The Front Room	A24 / 2AM	The Eggers Brothers (directors/screenplay); Brandy Norwood, Andrew Burnap, Neal Huff, Kathryn Hunter	
S E P T E M B E R	6	His Three Daughters	Netflix / Tango Entertainment	Azazel Jacobs (director/screenplay); Carrie Coon, Elizabeth Olsen, Natasha Lyonne, Rudy Galvan, Jose Febus, Jasmine Bracey, Jay O. Sanders, Jovan Adepo	
S E P T E M B E R	6	Rebel Ridge	Netflix	Jeremy Saulnier (director/screenplay); Aaron Pierre, Don Johnson, AnnaSophia Robb, David Denman, Emory Cohen, James Cromwell	
S E P T E M B E R	6	Continue	Lionsgate / Grindstone Entertainment Group	Nadine Crocker (directors/screenplay); Nadine Crocker, Emily Deschanel, Shiloh Fernandez, Lio Tipton, Kat Foster, Dale Dickey	
S E P T E M B E R	6	A New York Story	Vertical	Fiona Robert (director/screenplay), Sophia Robert (screenplay); Fiona Robert, Sophia Robert, Paul Karmiryan, Annabella Sciorra, Logan Miller, Whit Stillman	
S E P T E M B E R	6	The Thicket	Samuel Goldwyn Films / Tubi Films	Elliott Lester (director); Cristopher Kelley (screenplay); Peter Dinklage, Juliette Lewis, Levon Hawke, Esmé Creed-Miles, Leslie Grace, Gbenga Akinnagbe	
S E P T E M B E R	6	I'll Be Right There	Brainstorm Media	Brendan Walsh (director); Jim Beggarly (screenplay); Edie Falco, Jeannie Berlin, Charlie Tahan, Kayli Carter, Michael Rapaport, Michael Beach, Sepideh Moafi, Bradley Whitford	
S E P T E M B E R	10	Dead Teenagers	Good Deed Entertainment	Quinn Armstrong (director/screenplay); Jordan Myers, Maya Jeyam, Tony White, Mary Charles Miller, Angel Ray, Chris Hahn, Beau Roberts	
S E P T E M B E R	13	Speak No Evil	Universal Pictures / Blumhouse Productions	James Watkins (director/screenplay); James McAvoy, Mackenzie Davis, Aisling Franciosi, Alix West Lefler, Dan Hough, Scoot McNairy	
S E P T E M B E R	13	The Killer's Game	Lionsgate	J. J. Perry (director); Rand Ravich, James Coyne (screenplay); Dave Bautista, Sofia Boutella, Terry Crews, Scott Adkins, Pom Klementieff, Ben Kingsley	
S E P T E M B E R	13	My Old Ass	Metro-Goldwyn-Mayer / Indian Paintbrush / LuckyChap Entertainment	Megan Park (director/screenplay); Maisy Stella, Percy Hynes White, Maddie Ziegler, Kerrice Brooks, Maria Dizzia, Aubrey Plaza	
S E P T E M B E R	13	Uglies	Netflix / Davis Entertainment / Anonymous Content	McG (director); Jacob Forman, Vanessa Taylor, Whit Anderson (screenplay); Joey King, Keith Powers, Brianne Tju, Chase Stokes, Laverne Cox	
S E P T E M B E R	13	Winner	Vertical / Big Beach	Susanna Fogel (director); Kerry Howley (screenplay); Emilia Jones, Connie Britton, Danny Ramirez, Kathryn Newton, Zach Galifianakis	
S E P T E M B E R	13	Here After	Paramount Pictures	Robert Salerno (director); Sarah Conradt (screenplay); Connie Britton, Freya Hannan-Mills, Giovanni Cirfiera	
S E P T E M B E R	13	The 4:30 Movie	Saban Films / SMODCO	Kevin Smith (director/screenplay); Austin Zajur, Nicholas Cirillo, Reed Northrup, Siena Agudong, Ken Jeong	
S E P T E M B E R	13	Subservience	XYZ Films / Millennium Media	S.K. Dale (director); Will Honley, April Maguire (screenplay); Megan Fox, Michele Morrone, Madeline Zima	
S E P T E M B E R	13	Booger	Dark Sky Films / Neon Heart Productions / Ley Line Entertainment	Mary Dauterman (director/screenplay); Grace Glowicki, Garrick Bernard, Heather Matarazzo, Marcia DeBonis	
S E P T E M B E R	13	The Waterboyz	Quiver Distribution	Coke Daniels (director/screenplay); Quavo, La La Anthony, Omar Dorsey, Rockmond Dunbar	
S E P T E M B E R	20	Transformers One	Paramount Pictures / Hasbro Entertainment / New Republic Pictures / Di Bonaventura Pictures	Josh Cooley (director); Eric Pearson, Andrew Barrer, Gabriel Ferrari (screenplay); Chris Hemsworth, Brian Tyree Henry, Scarlett Johansson, Keegan-Michael Key, Steve Buscemi, Laurence Fishburne, Jon Hamm	
S E P T E M B E R	20	Wolfs	Apple TV+ / Plan B Entertainment / Smokehouse Pictures	Jon Watts (director/screenplay); George Clooney, Brad Pitt, Amy Ryan, Austin Abrams, Poorna Jagannathan, Zlatko Burić, Richard Kind	
S E P T E M B E R	20	Never Let Go	Lionsgate / Summit Entertainment / 21 Laps Entertainment	Alexandre Aja (director); Kevin Coughlin, Ryan Grassby (screenplay); Halle Berry, Percy Daggs IV, Anthony B. Jenkins	
S E P T E M B E R	20	The Substance	Mubi / Working Title Films	Coralie Fargeat (director/screenplay); Demi Moore, Margaret Qualley, Dennis Quaid	
S E P T E M B E R	20	A Different Man	A24 / Killer Films	Aaron Schimberg (director/screenplay); Sebastian Stan, Renate Reinsve, Adam Pearson	
S E P T E M B E R	20	Bagman	Lionsgate / Temple Hill Entertainment	Colm McCarthy (director); John Hulme (screenplay); Sam Claflin, Antonia Thomas, Frankie Corio, William Hope, Steven Cree	
S E P T E M B E R	20	Omni Loop	Magnolia Pictures / 2AM / Killer Films	Bernardo Britto (director/screenplay); Mary-Louise Parker, Ayo Edebiri, Carlos Jacott, Chris Witaske, Hannah Pearl Utt, Harris Yulin	
S E P T E M B E R	20	The Featherweight	mTuckman Media / Appian Way Productions	Robert Kolodny (director); Steve Loff (screenplay); James Madio, Ruby Wolf, Keir Gilchrist, Stephen Lang, Ron Livingston, Lawrence Gilliard Jr.	
S E P T E M B E R	20	In the Summers	Music Box Films	Alessandra Lacorazza Samudio (director/screenplay); René Pérez, Sasha Calle, Leslie Grace	
S E P T E M B E R	24	Kill 'Em All 2	Destination Films	Valeri Milev (director); James Agnew (screenplay); Jean-Claude Van Damme, Jacqueline Fernandez, Peter Stormare, María Conchita Alonso	
S E P T E M B E R	24	Paradox Effect	Gravitas Ventures	Scott Weintrob (director); Samuel Bartlett, Andrea Iervolino, Ferdinando Dell'Omo (screenplay); Olga Kurylenko, Harvey Keitel, Alice Astons	
S E P T E M B E R	26	Killer Heat	Amazon Prime Video	Philippe Lacôte (director); Roberto Bentivegna, Matt Charman (screenplay); Joseph Gordon-Levitt, Shailene Woodley, Richard Madden	
S E P T E M B E R	27	The Wild Robot	Universal Pictures / DreamWorks Animation	Chris Sanders (director/screenplay); Lupita Nyong'o, Pedro Pascal, Kit Connor, Bill Nighy, Stephanie Hsu, Mark Hamill, Catherine O'Hara, Matt Berry, Ving Rhames	
S E P T E M B E R	27	Saturday Night	Columbia Pictures	Jason Reitman (director/screenplay); Gil Kenan (screenplay); Gabriel LaBelle, Rachel Sennott, Cory Michael Smith, Ella Hunt, Dylan O'Brien, Emily Fairn, Matt Wood, Lamorne Morris, Kim Matula, Finn Wolfhard, Nicholas Braun, Cooper Hoffman, Andrew Barth Feldman, Kaia Gerber, Tommy Dewey, Willem Dafoe, Matthew Rhys, J. K. Simmons	
S E P T E M B E R	27	Megalopolis	Lionsgate / American Zoetrope	Francis Ford Coppola (director/screenplay); Adam Driver, Giancarlo Esposito, Nathalie Emmanuel, Aubrey Plaza, Shia LaBeouf, Jon Voight, Laurence Fishburne, Talia Shire, Jason Schwartzman, Kathryn Hunter, Grace VanderWaal, Chloe Fineman, James Remar, D. B. Sweeney, Dustin Hoffman	
S E P T E M B E R	27	Apartment 7A	Paramount+ / Paramount Pictures / Paramount Players / Platinum Dunes / Sunday Night Productions	Natalie Erika James (director/screenplay); Christian White, Skylar James (screenplay); Julia Garner, Dianne Wiest, Jim Sturgess, Kevin McNally	
S E P T E M B E R	27	Rez Ball	Netflix / SpringHill Company / Chernin Entertainment / Lake Ellyn Entertainment	Sydney Freeland (director/screenplay); Sterlin Harjo (screenplay); Jessica Matten, Julia Jones, Amber Midthunder, Kiowa Gordon, Dallas Goldtooth, Cody Lightning	
S E P T E M B E R	27	The Curse of the Necklace	Warner Bros. Discovery Home Entertainment	Juan Pablo Arias Munoz (director); John Ducey (screenplay); Madeleine McGraw, Violet McGraw, Christina Moore, Sarah Lind, Henry Thomas	
S E P T E M B E R	27	Azrael	IFC Films / Shudder / Republic Pictures	E. L. Katz (director); Simon Barrett (screenplay); Samara Weaving, Vic Carmen Sonne, Katariina Unt, Nathan Stewart-Jarrett	
S E P T E M B E R	27	Amber Alert	Lionsgate	Kerry Bellessa (director/screenplay); Hayden Panettiere, Tyler James Williams, Kevin Dunn	
S E P T E M B E R	27	Abruptio	Anchor Bay Entertainment	Evan Marlowe (director/screenplay); James Marsters, Hana Mae Lee, Christopher McDonald, Jordan Peele, Sid Haig, Robert Englund	
S E P T E M B E R	27	She Taught Love	Hulu / Andscape	Nate Edwards (director); Darrell Britt-Gibson (screenplay); Arsema Thomas, Darrell Britt-Gibson, Taissa Farmiga, Alexander Hodge, D'Arcy Carden, Edwin Lee Gibson	

== October–December ==
Opening		Title	Company credits	Cast and crew	Ref.
O C T O B E R	1	Another Happy Day	Gravitas Ventures	Nora Fiffer (director/screenplay); Lauren Lapkus, Marilyn Dodds Frank, Jean Elie, Carrie Coon	
O C T O B E R	1	Crackcoon	Cineverse	Brad Twigg (director/screenplay); Gary Lee Vincent, Todd Martin (screenplay); John A. Russo, Rosaria Eraso, Justin P. Martin, Gary Lee Vincent, Jessa Flux, Chris O'Brocki, Angel Bradford, Hunter Redfern, Tim Hale, Morrigan Thompson, Tom Hoover	
O C T O B E R	3	Chaperone	Filmhub / 1919 Films	Zoe Eisenberg (director/screenplay); Mitzi Akaha, Laird Akeo, Kanoa Goo, Jessica Jade Andres	
O C T O B E R	3	'Salem's Lot	Max / Warner Bros. Pictures / New Line Cinema / Atomic Monster / Vertigo Entertainment	Gary Dauberman (director/screenplay); Lewis Pullman, Makenzie Leigh, Alfre Woodard, John Benjamin Hickey, Bill Camp, Jordan Preston Carter, Nicholas Crovetti, Spencer Treat Clark, William Sadler, Pilou Asbæk	
O C T O B E R	3	House of Spoils	Amazon MGM Studios / Blumhouse Productions / Divide/Conquer	Bridget Savage Cole, Danielle Krudy (directors/screenplay); Ariana DeBose, Barbie Ferreira, Arian Moayed, Marton Csokas	
O C T O B E R	3	Hold Your Breath	Hulu / Searchlight Pictures	Karrie Crouse, Will Joines (directors); Karrie Crouse (screenplay); Sarah Paulson, Amiah Miller, Annaleigh Ashford, Alona Jane Robbins, Ebon Moss-Bachrach	
O C T O B E R	4	Joker: Folie à Deux	Warner Bros. Pictures / DC Entertainment	Todd Phillips (director/screenplay); Scott Silver (screenplay); Joaquin Phoenix, Lady Gaga, Brendan Gleeson, Catherine Keener, Zazie Beetz, Steve Coogan, Harry Lawtey, Leigh Gill	
O C T O B E R	4	White Bird	Lionsgate / Participant / Kingdom Story Company / Mandeville Films	Marc Forster (director); Mark Bomback (screenplay); Ariella Glaser, Orlando Schwerdt, Bryce Gheisar, Gillian Anderson, Helen Mirren	
O C T O B E R	4	It's What's Inside	Netflix	Greg Jardin (director/screenplay); Brittany O'Grady, James Morosini, Gavin Leatherwood, Nina Bloomgarden, Alycia Debnam-Carey, Reina Hardesty, Devon Terrell, David W. Thompson, Madison Davenport	
O C T O B E R	4	Monster Summer	Pastime Pictures	David Henrie (director); Cornelius Uliano, Bryan Schulz (screenplay); Mason Thames, Lorraine Bracco, Mel Gibson, Kevin James	
O C T O B E R	4	Things Will Be Different	Magnet Releasing	Michael Felker (director/screenplay); Adam David Thompson, Riley Dandy, Chloe Skoczen, Justin Benson, Sarah Bolger	
O C T O B E R	4	The Forest Hills	My Way Pictures / Dreznick Goldberg Production / Digital Thunderdome	Scott Goldberg (director/screenplay); Chiko Mendez, Shelley Duvall, Edward Furlong, Dee Wallace	
O C T O B E R	4	The Problem with People	Quiver Distribution	Chris Cottam (director); Wally Marzano-Lesnevich, Paul Reiser (screenplay); Paul Reiser, Colm Meaney, Jane Levy, Lucianne McEvoy	
O C T O B E R	4	Little Bites	RLJE Films / Shudder	Spider One (director/screenplay); Krsy Fox, Elizabeth Phoenix Caro, Jon Sklaroff, Chaz Bono, Barbara Crampton, Heather Langenkamp, Bonnie Aarons	
O C T O B E R	8	Hellboy: The Crooked Man	Ketchup Entertainment / Millennium Media / Dark Horse Entertainment	Brian Taylor (director/screenplay); Christopher Golden, Mike Mignola (screenplay); Jack Kesy, Jefferson White, Adeline Rudolph	
O C T O B E R	10	Brothers	Amazon MGM Studios / Legendary Entertainment	Max Barbakow (director); Macon Blair (screenplay); Josh Brolin, Peter Dinklage, Glenn Close, Marisa Tomei, Brendan Fraser	
O C T O B E R	10	Caddo Lake	Max / Warner Bros. Pictures / New Line Cinema / Blinding Edge Pictures	Celine Held, Logan George (directors/screenplay); Dylan O'Brien, Eliza Scanlen, Lauren Ambrose, Eric Lange, Sam Hennings	
O C T O B E R	11	Terrifier 3	Cineverse	Damien Leone (director/screenplay); Lauren LaVera, Elliot Fullam, Samantha Scaffidi, David Howard Thornton	
O C T O B E R	11	Piece by Piece	Focus Features / I Am Other / Tremolo Productions / The Lego Group	Morgan Neville (director/screenplay); Jason Zeldes, Aaron Wickenden, Oscar Vazquez (screenplay); Pharrell Williams, Gwen Stefani, Kendrick Lamar, Timbaland, Justin Timberlake, Jay-Z, Busta Rhymes, Snoop Dogg	
O C T O B E R	11	The Apprentice	Briarcliff Entertainment / Scythia Films / Tailored Films	Ali Abbasi (director); Gabriel Sherman (screenplay); Sebastian Stan, Jeremy Strong, Martin Donovan, Maria Bakalova	
O C T O B E R	11	Lonely Planet	Netflix	Susannah Grant (director/screenplay); Laura Dern, Liam Hemsworth, Diana Silvers	
O C T O B E R	11	The Silent Hour	Republic Pictures / AGC Studios	Brad Anderson (director); Dan Hall (screenplay); Joel Kinnaman, Sandra Mae Frank, Mekhi Phifer, Mark Strong	
O C T O B E R	11	Bad Genius	Vertical	J.C. Lee (director/screenplay); Julius Onah (screenplay); Benedict Wong, Callina Liang, Jabari Banks, Taylor Hickson, Sarah-Jane Redmond	
O C T O B E R	11	Seven Cemeteries	Quiver Distribution	John Gulager (director); Joel Soisson (screenplay); Danny Trejo, Samantha Ashley, Efren Ramirez, Vincent M. Ward, Lew Temple, Richard Esteras, Maria Canals-Barrera	
O C T O B E R	11	The Man in the White Van	Relativity Media / Legion M / XYZ Films	Warren Skeels (director/screenplay); Sean Astin, Ali Larter, Madison Wolfe, Brec Bassinger, Gavin Warren, Skai Jackson	
O C T O B E R	15	9 Windows	Gravitas Ventures	Lou Simon (director/screenplay); William Forsythe, Michael Paré	
O C T O B E R	18	Smile 2	Paramount Pictures / Temple Hill Entertainment	Parker Finn (director/screenplay); Naomi Scott, Rosemarie DeWitt, Lukas Gage, Miles Gutierrez-Riley, Peter Jacobson, Ray Nicholson, Dylan Gelula, Raúl Castillo, Kyle Gallner	
O C T O B E R	18	Anora	Neon / FilmNation Entertainment	Sean Baker (director/screenplay); Mikey Madison, Mark Eydelshteyn, Yura Borisov, Karren Karagulian, Vache Tovmasyan, Aleksei Serebryakov	
O C T O B E R	18	Goodrich	Ketchup Entertainment / Pascal Pictures	Hallie Meyers-Shyer (director/screenplay); Michael Keaton, Mila Kunis, Andie MacDowell, Carmen Ejogo, Laura Benanti, Kevin Pollak	
O C T O B E R	18	Woman of the Hour	Netflix / AGC Studios / Vertigo Entertainment	Anna Kendrick (director); Ian McDonald (screenplay); Anna Kendrick, Daniel Zovatto, Nicolette Robinson, Tony Hale, Pete Holmes, Autumn Best, Kathryn Gallagher, Kelley Jakle	
O C T O B E R	18	The Line	Utopia	Ethan Berger (director/screenplay); Alex Russek (screenplay); Alex Wolff, Lewis Pullman, Halle Bailey, Austin Abrams, Angus Cloud, Bo Mitchell, Denise Richards, Cheri Oteri, Scoot McNairy, John Malkovich	
O C T O B E R	18	Exhibiting Forgiveness	Roadside Attractions	Titus Kaphar (director/screenplay); André Holland, Andra Day, John Earl Jelks, Aunjanue Ellis-Taylor	
O C T O B E R	18	High Tide	Strand Releasing / LD Entertainment	Marco Calvani (director/screenplay); Marco Pigossi, James Bland, Marisa Tomei, Bill Irwin	
O C T O B E R	20	Audrey's Children	Blue Harbor Entertainment	Ami Canaan Mann (director); Julia Fisher Farbman (screenplay); Natalie Dormer, Jimmi Simpson, Brandon Micheal Hall, Julianna Layne, Clancy Brown	
O C T O B E R	22	To Fall in Love	Gravitas Ventures	Michael Lewis Foster (director); Jennifer Lane (screenplay); Beth Gallagher, Eric Casalini, Reese Lily Buell	
O C T O B E R	24	Canary Black	Amazon MGM Studios	Pierre Morel (director); Matthew Kennedy (screenplay); Kate Beckinsale, Rupert Friend, Ray Stevenson, Saffron Burrows, Goran Kostić, Ben Miles	
O C T O B E R	25	Venom: The Last Dance	Columbia Pictures / Marvel Entertainment / Arad Productions / Pascal Pictures / Hardy Son & Baker	Kelly Marcel (director/screenplay); Tom Hardy, Chiwetel Ejiofor, Juno Temple, Rhys Ifans, Peggy Lu, Alanna Ubach, Stephen Graham	
O C T O B E R	25	Conclave	Focus Features / FilmNation Entertainment / Indian Paintbrush	Edward Berger (director); Peter Straughan (screenplay); Ralph Fiennes, Stanley Tucci, John Lithgow, Lucian Msamati, Carlos Diehz, Sergio Castellitto, Isabella Rossellini	
O C T O B E R	25	Your Monster	Vertical	Caroline Lindy (director/screenplay); Melissa Barrera, Tommy Dewey, Edmund Donovan, Kayla Foster, Meghann Fahy	
O C T O B E R	25	Don't Move	Netflix	Adam Schindler, Brian Netto (directors); T.J. Cimfel, David White (screenplay); Kelsey Asbille, Finn Wittrock, Moray Treadwell, Daniel Francis	
O C T O B E R	25	Magpie	Shout! Studios	Sam Yates (director); Tom Bateman (screenplay); Daisy Ridley, Shazad Latif, Matilda Lutz	
O C T O B E R	25	La cocina	Willa	Alonso Ruizpalacios (director/screenplay); Raúl Briones Carmona, Rooney Mara, Anna Diaz, Eduardo Olmos, Motell Foster, Oded Fehr, Laura Gómez, James Waterston	
O C T O B E R	25	Darla in Space	Freestyle Releasing	Eric Laplante, Susie Moon (directors/screenplay); Alex E. Harris, Thomas Jay Ryan, Constance Shulman, Jenn Lyon	
O C T O B E R	25	All You Need Is Blood	Level 33 Entertainment	Bucky Le Boeuf (director/screenplay); Logan Riley Bruner, Mena Suvari, Eddie Griffin	
O C T O B E R	25	1 Million Followers	Vertical	Harvey Lowry (director); Paul Kim (screenplay); Shelley Q, Evan Williams, Henry Ian Cusick, Ryan Jamaal Swain, Jade Ma, Constanza Palavecino, Patrick Atchison, Skye Ladell	
O C T O B E R	25	Hangdog	Good Deed Entertainment	Matt Cascella (director/screenplay); Jen Cordery (screenplay); Desmin Borges, Kelly O'Sullivan, Barbara Rosenblat, Steve Coulter, Catherine Curtin	
O C T O B E R	25	Let's Start a Cult	MPI Media Group	Ben Kitnick (director/screenplay); Stavros Halkias, Wes Haney (screenplay); Stavros Halkias, Wes Haney, Eric Rahill, Katy Fullan, Daniel Simonsen	
O C T O B E R	29	Amityville: Where the Echo Lives	Lionsgate	Carlos Ayala (director/screenplay); Sarah McDonald, Breanna Rossi, Adela Perez, Nicholas J. Barelli, Hector De Alva, Eugenia Preciado, Adelina Topleva, Olya Marynets, Simona Curkoska	
O C T O B E R	30	Time Cut	Netflix	Hannah Macpherson (director/screenplay); Michael Kennedy (screenplay); Madison Bailey, Antonia Gentry, Griffin Gluck	
N O V E M B E R	1	Here	TriStar Pictures / Miramax / ImageMovers	Robert Zemeckis (director/screenplay); Eric Roth (screenplay); Tom Hanks, Robin Wright, Paul Bettany, Kelly Reilly, Michelle Dockery	
N O V E M B E R	1	Juror #2	Warner Bros. Pictures / Gotham Group / Malpaso Productions	Clint Eastwood (director); Jonathan Abrams (screenplay); Nicholas Hoult, Toni Collette, J. K. Simmons, Chris Messina, Zoey Deutch, Cedric Yarbrough, Kiefer Sutherland	
N O V E M B E R	1	Blitz	Apple TV+ / Regency Enterprises / Working Title Films	Steve McQueen (director/screenplay); Saoirse Ronan, Elliott Heffernan, Harris Dickinson, Benjamin Clementine, Kathy Burke, Paul Weller, Stephen Graham	
N O V E M B E R	1	A Real Pain	Searchlight Pictures / Topic Studios / Fruit Tree	Jesse Eisenberg (director/screenplay); Jesse Eisenberg, Kieran Culkin, Will Sharpe, Jennifer Grey, Kurt Egyiawan, Liza Sadovy, Daniel Oreskes	
N O V E M B E R	1	Absolution	Samuel Goldwyn Films	Hans Petter Moland (director); Tony Gayton (screenplay); Liam Neeson, Ron Perlman, Yolonda Ross, Daniel Diemer	
N O V E M B E R	1	The Gutter	Magnolia Pictures / Village Roadshow Pictures	Yassir Lester, Isaiah Lester (directors); Yassir Lester (screenplay); Shameik Moore, Susan Sarandon, D'Arcy Carden, Jay Ellis, Jackée Harry, Paul Reiser, Adam Brody	
N O V E M B E R	1	The Graduates	The Future of Film Is Female	Hannah Peterson (director/screenplay); Mina Sundwall, Alex R. Hibbert, Yasmeen Fletcher, Ewan Manley, John Cho, Maria Dizzia, Kelly O'Sullivan	
N O V E M B E R	1	The Eye of the Salamander	Freestyle Releasing	Pavel Nikolajev (director/screenplay); Nick Karner, Seth Honzik, Pavel Nikolajev	
N O V E M B E R	1	Lost on a Mountain in Maine	Blue Fox Entertainment / Balboa Productions	Andrew Boodhoo Kightlinger (director); Luke Paradise (screenplay); Luke David Blumm, Paul Sparks, Caitlin FitzGerald, Ethan Slater	
N O V E M B E R	6	Meet Me Next Christmas	Netflix	Rusty Cundieff (director); Molly Halderman, Camilla Rubis (screenplay); Christina Milian, Devale Ellis, Kofi Siriboe	
N O V E M B E R	7	A Sudden Case of Christmas	Shout! Studios	Peter Chelsom (director/screenplay); Tinker Lindsay, Gianluca Bomprezzi, Neri Parenti, Federico Baccomo, Francesco Patierno (screenplay); Danny DeVito, Andie MacDowell, Wilmer Valderrama, Lucy DeVito	
N O V E M B E R	8	Heretic	A24	Scott Beck, Bryan Woods (directors/screenplay); Hugh Grant, Sophie Thatcher, Chloe East	
N O V E M B E R	8	The Best Christmas Pageant Ever	Lionsgate / Kingdom Story Company	Dallas Jenkins (director); Platte Clark, Darin McDaniel, Ryan Swanson (screenplay); Judy Greer, Pete Holmes, Lauren Graham	
N O V E M B E R	8	The Piano Lesson	Netflix / Escape Artists	Malcolm Washington (director/screenplay); Virgil Williams (screenplay); Samuel L. Jackson, John David Washington, Ray Fisher, Michael Potts, Erykah Badu, Skylar Aleece Smith, Danielle Deadwyler, Corey Hawkins	
N O V E M B E R	8	Elevation	Vertical / Lyrical Media	George Nolfi (director); John Glenn, Kenny Ryan, Jacob Roman (screenplay); Anthony Mackie, Morena Baccarin, Maddie Hasson, Tony Goldwyn	
N O V E M B E R	8	Christmas Eve in Miller's Point	IFC Films	Tyler Taormina (director/screenplay); Eric Berger (screenplay); Matilda Fleming, Maria Dizzia, Ben Shenkman, Francesca Scorsese, Elsie Fisher, Lev Cameron, Sawyer Spielberg, Gregg Turkington, Michael Cera	
N O V E M B E R	8	Bird	Mubi / BBC Film / BFI	Andrea Arnold (director/screenplay); Nykiya Adams, Barry Keoghan, Franz Rogowski, Jason Buda, Jasmine Jobson, Frankie Box, James Nelson-Joyce	
N O V E M B E R	8	Love Bomb	Quiver Distribution	David Guglielmo (director); Kathy Charles (screenplay); Jessie Andrews, Josh Caras, Zane Holtz	
N O V E M B E R	12	It's Coming	Early Autumn / Freestyle Digital Media	Shannon Alexander (director/producer)	
N O V E M B E R	13	Hot Frosty	Netflix / Muse Entertainment	Jerry Ciccoritti (director); Russell Hainline (screenplay); Lacey Chabert, Dustin Milligan, Craig Robinson, Joe Lo Truglio, Katy Mixon, Lauren Holly, Chrishell Stause	
N O V E M B E R	15	Red One	Metro-Goldwyn-Mayer / Seven Bucks Productions	Jake Kasdan (director); Chris Morgan (screenplay); Dwayne Johnson, Chris Evans, Lucy Liu, J.K. Simmons, Kiernan Shipka, Bonnie Hunt, Kristofer Hivju, Nick Kroll	
N O V E M B E R	15	Daruma	Freestyle Digital Media	Alexander Yellen (director); Kelli McNeil-Yellen (screenplay); Tobias Forrest, Victoria Scott, John W. Lawson, Abigail Hawk, Barry Bostwick, Sandi McCree, Kelli McNeil-Yellen, Joy Nash	
N O V E M B E R	15	Breakup Season	Buffalo 8	H. Nelson Tracey (director/screenplay); Chandler Riggs, Samantha Isler, Jacob Wysocki, James Urbaniak, Carly Stewart, Brook Hogan, Kailey Rhodes	
N O V E M B E R	19	Swap	Red Rabbit Pictures / Tru Diamond Entertainment	Dallas King (director/screenplay); Jessica Leila Greene, James Eastwood, Erin Anne Gray	
N O V E M B E R	20	The Merry Gentlemen	Netflix	Peter Sullivan (director); Marla Sokoloff (screenplay); Britt Robertson, Chad Michael Murray, Marla Sokoloff, Beth Broderick, Michael Gross, Maxwell Caulfield	
N O V E M B E R	22	Wicked	Universal Pictures / Marc Platt Productions	Jon M. Chu (director); Winnie Holzman, Dana Fox (screenplay); Cynthia Erivo, Ariana Grande, Jonathan Bailey, Ethan Slater, Bowen Yang, Marissa Bode, Peter Dinklage, Michelle Yeoh, Jeff Goldblum	
N O V E M B E R	22	Gladiator II	Paramount Pictures / Scott Free Productions / Lucy Fisher/Douglas Wick Productions	Ridley Scott (director); David Scarpa (screenplay); Paul Mescal, Pedro Pascal, Joseph Quinn, Fred Hechinger, Lior Raz, Derek Jacobi, Connie Nielsen, Denzel Washington	
N O V E M B E R	22	Spellbound	Netflix / Skydance Animation	Vicky Jenson (director); Lauren Hynek, Elizabeth Martin, Julia Miranda (screenplay); Rachel Zegler, John Lithgow, Jenifer Lewis, Tituss Burgess, Nathan Lane, Javier Bardem, Nicole Kidman	
N O V E M B E R	22	Armor	Lionsgate / Grindstone Entertainment Group	Justin Routt (director); Cory Todd Hughes, Adrian Speckert (screenplay); Sylvester Stallone, Jason Patric, Josh Wiggins, Dash Mihok	
N O V E M B E R	22	Out of My Mind	Disney+ / Big Beach / Participant	Amber Sealey (director); Daniel Stiepleman (screenplay); Phoebe-Rae Taylor, Rosemarie DeWitt, Luke Kirby, Judith Light, Jennifer Aniston	
N O V E M B E R	22	Bonhoeffer	Angel Studios	Todd Komarnicki (director/screenplay); Jonas Dassler, August Diehl, David Jonsson, Flula Borg, Moritz Bleibtreu, Patrick Mölleken, Clarke Peters	
N O V E M B E R	22	The Fix	Gravitas Ventures	Kelsey Egan (director/screenplay); Grace Van Dien, Daniel Sharman, Keenan Arrison, Tafara Nyatsanza, Nicole Fortuin	
N O V E M B E R	22	The Black Sea	Metrograph Pictures	Crystal Moselle, Derrick B. Harden (directors); Derrick B. Harden, Irmena Chichikova, Samuel Finzi, Stoyo Mirkov	
N O V E M B E R	25	Dear Santa	Paramount+ / Paramount Pictures / Conundrum Entertainment	Bobby Farrelly (director); Ricky Blitt, Peter Farrelly (screenplay); Jack Black, Keegan-Michael Key, Robert Timothy Smith, Brianne Howey, Hayes MacArthur, Post Malone, P. J. Byrne	
N O V E M B E R	26	Watchmen: Chapter II	Warner Bros. Animation / Paramount Pictures / DC Entertainment	Brandon Vietti (director); J. Michael Straczynski (screenplay); Matthew Rhys, Katee Sackhoff, Titus Welliver, Troy Baker, Rick D. Wasserman, Adrienne Barbeau, Jeffrey Combs, Geoff Pierson, Corey Burton, John Marshall Jones, Yuri Lowenthal, Kari Wahlgren, Grey DeLisle, Kelly Hu, Max Koch, Phil LaMarr, Dwight Schultz, Jason Spisak	
N O V E M B E R	26	Hemet, or the Landlady Don't Drink Tea	BayView Entertainment / Charybdis Pictures / Rosewood Five	Tony Olmos (director); Brian Patrick Butler (screenplay); Kimberly Weinberger, Brian Patrick Butler, Aimee La Joie, Randy Davison, Merrick McCartha, Matthew Rhodes, Nick Young, Pierce Wallace, Jake Golden, Mia Gascon, Derrick Acosta, Mark Atkinson	
N O V E M B E R	26	A Great Divide	Gravitas Ventures	Jean Shim (director/screenplay); Jeff Yang, Martina Nagel (screenplay); Ken Jeong, Jae Suh Park, Emerson Min, Miya Cech, MeeWha Alana Lee, Seamus Dever, Marshall Allman, Jamie McShane	
N O V E M B E R	27	Moana 2	Walt Disney Pictures / Walt Disney Animation Studios	David Derrick Jr. (director/screenplay); Jared Bush, Dana Ledoux Miller (screenplay); Auli'i Cravalho, Dwayne Johnson, Hualālai Chung, Rose Matafeo, David Fane, Awhimai Fraser, Khaleesi Lambert-Tsuda, Temuera Morrison, Nicole Scherzinger, Rachel House, Gerald Ramsey, Alan Tudyk	
N O V E M B E R	27	Queer	A24 / Fremantle / The Apartment Pictures / Frenesy Film Company	Luca Guadagnino (director); Justin Kuritzkes (screenplay); Daniel Craig, Drew Starkey, Jason Schwartzman, Henry Zaga, Omar Apollo, Lesley Manville	
N O V E M B E R	27	Maria	Netflix / Fremantle / The Apartment Pictures / FilmNation Entertainment	Pablo Larraín (director); Steven Knight (screenplay); Angelina Jolie, Pierfrancesco Favino, Alba Rohrwacher, Haluk Bilginer, Stephen Ashfield, Valeria Golino, Kodi Smit-McPhee	
N O V E M B E R	27	Our Little Secret	Netflix	Stephen Herek (director); Hailey DeDomonicis (screenplay); Lindsay Lohan, Ian Harding, Tim Meadows, Jon Rudnitsky, Henry Czerny, Judy Reyes, Chris Parnell, Kristin Chenoweth	
N O V E M B E R	28	Sweethearts	Max / Warner Bros. Pictures / New Line Cinema	Jordan Weiss (director/screenplay); Dan Brier (screenplay); Kiernan Shipka, Nico Hiraga, Caleb Hearon, Tramell Tillman, Charlie Hall, Ava DeMary, Joel Kim Booster, Christine Taylor	
N O V E M B E R	29	Nutcrackers	Hulu / Rough House Pictures	David Gordon Green (director); Leland Douglas (screenplay); Ben Stiller, Linda Cardellini, Edi Patterson, Tim Heidecker, Toby Huss	
D E C E M B E R	6	Y2K	A24	Kyle Mooney (director/screenplay); Evan Winter (screenplay); Jaeden Martell, Rachel Zegler, Julian Dennison, The Kid Laroi, Lachlan Watson, Daniel Zolghadri, Mason Gooding, Lauren Balone, Eduardo Franco, Fred Durst, Alicia Silverstone	
D E C E M B E R	6	Nightbitch	Searchlight Pictures / Annapurna Pictures	Marielle Heller (director/screenplay); Amy Adams, Scoot McNairy, Arleigh Patrick Snowden, Emmett James Snowden, Zoe Chao, Mary Holland, Archana Rajan, Jessica Harper	
D E C E M B E R	6	The Six Triple Eight	Netflix / Mandalay Pictures / Tyler Perry Studios	Tyler Perry (director/screenplay); Kerry Washington, Sam Waterston, Susan Sarandon, Oprah Winfrey	
D E C E M B E R	6	The Order	Vertical / AGC Studios	Justin Kurzel (director); Zach Baylin (screenplay); Jude Law, Nicholas Hoult, Tye Sheridan, Jurnee Smollett, Alison Oliver, Marc Maron	
D E C E M B E R	6	Werewolves	Briarcliff Entertainment	Steven C. Miller (director); Matthew Kennedy (screenplay); Frank Grillo, Katrina Law, Ilfenesh Hadera, James Michael Cummings, Lou Diamond Phillips	
D E C E M B E R	6	The Return	Bleecker Street / HanWay Films / Rai Cinema	Uberto Pasolini (director/screenplay); John Collee, Edward Bond (screenplay); Ralph Fiennes, Juliette Binoche, Charlie Plummer	
D E C E M B E R	6	Oh, Canada	Kino Lorber	Paul Schrader (director/screenplay); Richard Gere, Uma Thurman, Michael Imperioli, Jacob Elordi	
D E C E M B E R	6	Mary	Netflix	D. J. Caruso (director); Timothy Michael Hayes (screenplay); Noa Cohen, Ido Tako, Anthony Hopkins	
D E C E M B E R	6	Lake George	Magnet Releasing	Jeffrey Reiner (director/screenplay); Shea Whigham, Carrie Coon, Max Casella	
D E C E M B E R	6	Jenni	Vix	Gigi Saul Guerrero (director); Shane McKenzie, Kate Lanier (screenplay); Annie Gonzalez, Manuel Uriza, Cinthya Carmona, Jero Medina, Miguel Ángel, Gabriela Reynoso, J. R. Villarreal	
D E C E M B E R	13	Kraven the Hunter	Columbia Pictures / Marvel Entertainment / Arad Productions	J. C. Chandor (director); Richard Wenk, Art Marcum, Matt Holloway (screenplay); Aaron Taylor-Johnson, Ariana DeBose, Fred Hechinger, Alessandro Nivola, Christopher Abbott, Russell Crowe	
D E C E M B E R	13	The Lord of the Rings: The War of the Rohirrim	Warner Bros. Pictures / New Line Cinema / Warner Bros. Animation / WingNut Films / Sola Entertainment	Kenji Kamiyama (director); Jeffrey Addis, Will Matthews, Phoebe Gittins, Arty Papageorgiou (screenplay); Brian Cox, Gaia Wise, Luke Pasqualino, Miranda Otto, Laurence Ubong Williams, Shaun Dooley	
D E C E M B E R	13	Carry-On	Netflix / DreamWorks Pictures	Jaume Collet-Serra (director); T.J. Fixman (screenplay); Taron Egerton, Sofia Carson, Danielle Deadwyler, Jason Bateman	
D E C E M B E R	13	The Day the Earth Blew Up: A Looney Tunes Movie	Ketchup Entertainment / Warner Bros. Animation	Pete Browngardt (director/screenplay); Darrick Bachman, Kevin Costello, Andrew Dickman, David Gemmill, Alex Kirwan, Ryan Kramer, Jason Reicher, Michael Ruocco, Johnny Ryan, Eddie Trigueros (screenplay); Eric Bauza, Candi Milo, Peter MacNicol, Fred Tatasciore, Laraine Newman	
D E C E M B E R	13	September 5	Paramount Pictures / Republic Pictures / Constantin Film	Tim Fehlbaum (director/screenplay); Moritz Binder (screenplay); Peter Sarsgaard, John Magaro, Ben Chaplin, Leonie Benesch	
D E C E M B E R	13	Nickel Boys	Orion Pictures / Plan B Entertainment / Louverture Films / Anonymous Content	RaMell Ross (director/screenplay); Joslyn Barnes (screenplay); Ethan Herisse, Brandon Wilson, Aunjanue Ellis-Taylor, Hamish Linklater, Fred Hechinger, Daveed Diggs	
D E C E M B E R	13	The Last Showgirl	Roadside Attractions / Utopia / Pinky Promise	Gia Coppola (director); Kate Gersten (screenplay); Pamela Anderson, Jamie Lee Curtis, Dave Bautista, Brenda Song, Kiernan Shipka, Billie Lourd, Jason Schwartzman	
D E C E M B E R	13	Dirty Angels	Lionsgate / Millennium Media / Nu Boyana Film Studios	Martin Campbell (director/screenplay); Yariv Lerner, Robert Van Norden (screenplay); Eva Green, Ruby Rose, Maria Bakalova, Rona-Lee Shimon, Jonica T. Gibbs, Emily Bruni, Christopher Backus	
D E C E M B E R	13	Filthy Animals	Northway Films / Freestyle Releasing	James T. North (director/screenplay); Raymond J. Barry, Ryan Patrick Brown, Austan Wheeler, Mena Elizabeth Santos, Peter Larney, Luke Wessman, Nicola Aara	
D E C E M B E R	13	The Activated Man	Stonecutter Media	Nicholas Gyeney (director/screenplay); Tony Todd, Sean Young, Kane Hodder, Andrew Keegan, Vladimir Kulich, Sab Shimono, Jamie Costa	
D E C E M B E R	17	The Little Mermaid	Lionsgate	Leigh Scott (director/screenplay); Mike Markoff, Jeff Denton, Samuel Selman, Sean Michael Argo, Winston Crooke, Steven Yniguez, Manon Laurent, Lydia Helen	
D E C E M B E R	17	Glue Trap	Gravitas Ventures	Justin Geldzahler (director/screenplay); Brittany Bradford, Isaac W. Jay	
D E C E M B E R	17	Glass Casa	Glass House Distribution	Laa Marcus (director/screenplay); Lizet Benrey, Harley Bronwyn, Nicole Clifford, Geri Courtney-Austein, Anthony De La Cruz	
D E C E M B E R	20	Sonic the Hedgehog 3	Paramount Pictures / Sega Sammy Group / Original Film / Marza Animation Planet / Blur Studio	Jeff Fowler (director); Patrick Casey, Josh Miller, John Whittington (screenplay); Jim Carrey, Ben Schwartz, Krysten Ritter, Natasha Rothwell, Shemar Moore, Lee Majdoub, Colleen O'Shaughnessey, James Marsden, Tika Sumpter, Idris Elba, Keanu Reeves	
D E C E M B E R	20	Mufasa: The Lion King	Walt Disney Pictures	Barry Jenkins (director); Jeff Nathanson (screenplay); Aaron Pierre, Kelvin Harrison Jr., John Kani, Seth Rogen, Billy Eichner, Tiffany Boone, Donald Glover, Mads Mikkelsen, Thandiwe Newton, Lennie James, Anika Noni Rose, Blue Ivy Carter, Beyoncé Knowles-Carter	
D E C E M B E R	20	The Brutalist	A24 / Brookstreet Pictures	Brady Corbet (director/screenplay); Mona Fastvold (screenplay); Adrien Brody, Felicity Jones, Guy Pearce, Joe Alwyn, Raffey Cassidy, Stacy Martin, Emma Laird, Isaach de Bankolé, Alessandro Nivola	
D E C E M B E R	20	Homestead	Angel Studios	Ben Smallbone (director); Phillip Abraham, Leah Bateman, Jason Ross (screenplay); Neal McDonough, Dawn Olivieri, Currie Graham, Susan Misner, Bailey Chase, Jesse Hutch	
D E C E M B E R	25	Nosferatu	Focus Features / Maiden Voyage Pictures / Studio 8	Robert Eggers (director/screenplay); Bill Skarsgård, Nicholas Hoult, Lily-Rose Depp, Aaron Taylor-Johnson, Emma Corrin, Ralph Ineson, Simon McBurney, Willem Dafoe	
D E C E M B E R	25	Better Man	Paramount Pictures	Michael Gracey (director/screenplay); Simon Gleeson, Oliver Cole (screenplay); Robbie Williams, Jonno Davies, Steve Pemberton, Alison Steadman	
D E C E M B E R	25	A Complete Unknown	Searchlight Pictures / Veritas Entertainment / The Picture Company	James Mangold (director/screenplay); Jay Cocks (screenplay); Timothée Chalamet, Edward Norton, Elle Fanning, Monica Barbaro, Boyd Holbrook, Dan Fogler, Norbert Leo Butz, Eriko Hatsune, Big Bill Morganfield, Will Harrison, Scoot McNairy	
D E C E M B E R	25	The Fire Inside	Metro-Goldwyn-Mayer	Rachel Morrison (director); Barry Jenkins (screenplay); Ryan Destiny, Brian Tyree Henry	
D E C E M B E R	25	Babygirl	A24 / 2AM	Halina Reijn (director/screenplay); Nicole Kidman, Harris Dickinson, Sophie Wilde, Antonio Banderas	
D E C E M B E R	25	Los Frikis	Wayward/Range / Lord Miller	Michael Schwartz, Tyler Nilson (directors/screenplay); Héctor Medina, Adria Arjona, Eros de la Puente	
D E C E M B E R	27	Bloody Axe Wound	Shudder / RLJE Films	Matthew John Lawrence (director/screenplay); Molly Brown, Jeffrey Dean Morgan, Billy Burke	

== See also ==
- List of 2024 box office number-one films in the United States
- 2024 in the United States
