= Chaperone (2024 film) =

2024 film directed by Zoe Eisenberg

- Directed by: Zoe Eisenberg
- Written by: Zoe Eisenberg
- Cinematography: Kali Kasashima
- Music by: Taimane Gardner
- Production companies: 1919 Films; Kumau Productions; 9Isle Films
- Distributed by: FilmHub
- Release dates: January 19, 2024 (Slamdance Film Festival); September 11, 2025 (Limited)
- Running time: 99 minutes
- Country: United States
- Language: English

Chaperone is a 2024 drama film directed by Zoe Eisenberg starring Mitzi Akaha, Laird Akeo, Kanoa Goo, Krista Alvarez, and Jessica Jade Andres.

== Premise ==
At 29 and lacking ambition, Mischa begins a relationship with an 18-year-old athlete after he mistakes her for a student.

== Cast ==
- Kanoa Goo as Vik
- Jessica Jade Andres as Kenzie
- Laird Ake as Jake
- Mitzi Akaha as Misha
- Krista Alvarez as Georgia
- Ioane Goodhue as Kana
- Autumn Miyares Thompson as Lani

== Production ==
Mitzi Akaha and Laird Akeo play 29-year-old Misha and her love interest, Jake, who is significantly younger than her.

The film is set in Hilo, Hawaii, and the cast is composed entirely of Asian Pacific American actors.

== Release ==
The film had its world premiere at the 2024 Slamdance Film Festival. It was released by FilmHub in select theaters on September 11, 2025, followed by a digital release on October 3, 2025.

== Reception ==
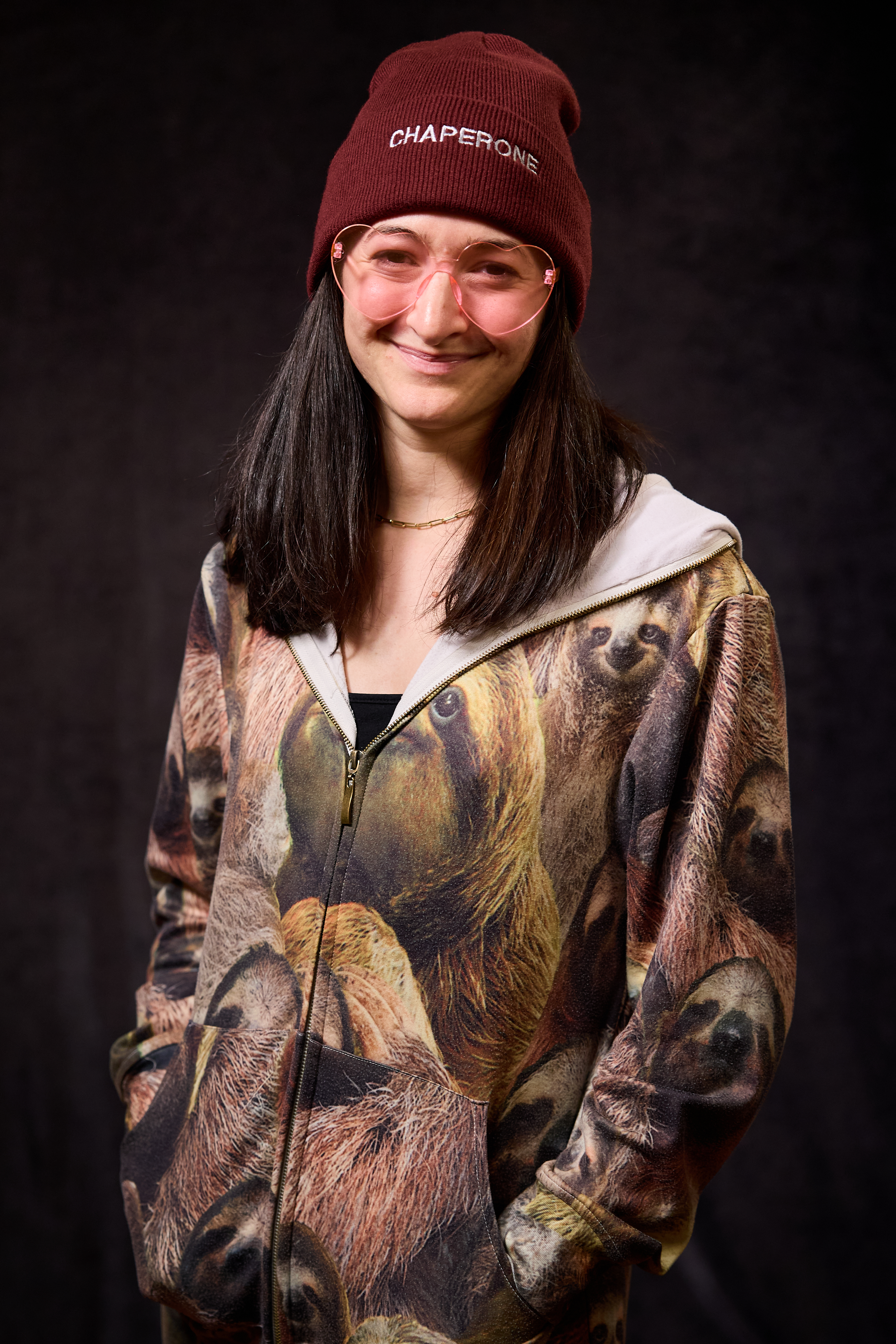
Chaperone is the debut film of director Zoë Eisenberg.

On the review aggregator website Rotten Tomatoes, 100% of 11 critics' reviews are positive.

On Alliance of Women Film Journalists (Awfj), Alexandra Heller-Nicholas wrote that "Chaperone is not an easy watch and it does not shy away from the often uncomfortable ethical terrain its storyline demands it explore, but it is also thoughtful and humane."

In his review on Film Threat, Jason Delgado rated the film 9/10, writing that "everything about Chaperone is superb, from the cast, location, writing, and directing to the cinematography. Mitzi Akaha and Laird Akeo have instant chemistry onscreen, and everyone else plays their roles perfectly."

== See also ==
- List of drama films of the 2020s
- List of American films of 2024
