= Chestnut (film) =

2023 American drama film

- Film poster
- Directed by: Jac Cron
- Written by: Jac Cron
- Produced by: Lizzie Shapiro; Lexi Tannenholtz
- Starring: Natalia Dyer; Rachel Keller; Danny Ramirez; Chella Man
- Cinematography: Matt Clegg
- Edited by: Avner Shiloah
- Music by: Keegan DeWitt
- Production companies: Utopia Originals; The Space Program; Neon Heart Productions
- Distributed by: Utopia
- Release dates: June 15, 2023 (Frameline); June 21, 2024 (United States)
- Running time: 87 minutes
- Country: United States
- Language: English
- Box office: $8,631

Chestnut is a 2023 American drama film written and directed by Jac Cron in her feature directorial debut, and starring Natalia Dyer, Rachel Keller, Danny Ramirez and Chella Man.

Chestnut had its world premiere at Frameline Film Festival on 15 June 2023. The film was released in select cinemas in the United States on 21 June 2024 by Utopia.

== Premise ==
During the summer after graduating from college, Annie is stuck in her university town of Philadelphia. After meeting Tyler and Danny in a bar, Annie becomes entangled in a love triangle with them.

== Cast ==
- Natalia Dyer as Annie
- Rachel Keller as Tyler
- Danny Ramirez as Danny
- Chella Man as Jason
- Caleb Eberhardt as Connor
- Haniq Best as Alicia
- Eric Francis Melaragni as Scott
- Nathaniel Wood as Isaac

== Production ==
Principal photography on Chestnut began in September 2021 in Philadelphia and wrapped in October 2021.

In an interview, Cron stated that Dyer was her first choice for the role of Annie.

== Release ==
Chestnut premiered at the Frameline Film Festival in June 2023. On November 3, 2023, the film screened at the Austin Film Festival.

The film was released in limited theaters in the United States on June 21, 2024, and on digital on July 2, 2024.

== Reception ==
=== Box office ===
Chestnut grossed $4,969 from 7 cinemas during its opening weekend in the United States.

=== Critical response ===
On the review aggregator website Rotten Tomatoes, 46% of 13 critics' reviews are positive, with an average rating of 5.3/10. Metacritic, which uses a weighted average, assigned the film a score of 51 out of 100, based on 5 critics, indicating "mixed or average" reviews.

=== Accolades ===
List of awards and nominations for Chestnut
Award or film festival	Ceremony date	Category	Recipient(s)	Result	Ref.
Philadelphia Film Festival	29 October 2023	Best Local Feature	Chestnut	Nominated	
