= Nacho Faerna =

Spanish author and scriptwriter

Nacho Faerna (born 1967, Madrid) is a Spanish author and scriptwriter. He studied Information Sciences at the Complutense University, before switching to scriptwriting, completing a workshop in Los Angeles and a Master's degree in scriptwriting from the Autonomous University in Madrid.

He is best known for works such as:

- La mujer más fea del mundo (1999), feature film
- La madre, short film, winner of the Premio Goya for the best fiction short in 1994
- Verano en la universidad, documentary, winner of the Premio Goya for the best documentary short in 1994.

His debut novel, Quieto, was nominated for the Premio Tigre Juan. Another book El asesinato de la calle del turco was also accompanied by a TV movie of the same name.
