= Fugitive Dreams =

Fugitive Dreams is a 2020 American black-and-white independent road movie with elements of magical realism. It was written and directed by Jason Neulander, and stars April Matthis and Robbie Tann, and features the performances of Scott Shepherd, O-Lan Jones, and David Patrick Kelly. Fugitive Dreams was publicly released in 2024.

The film centers on a journey across a surreal America by two homeless people. It discards conventional narrative storytelling by blurring the lines between what the characters experience as real and as dreams. A key element in the film is Peter Simonite's painterly camerawork which is inspired by road movies of the classic Hollywood era and the late-70s and early-80s, such as Down By Law, Alice in the Cities, and Paris, Texas.

== Plot ==
A homeless woman, Mary (Matthis), is on the verge of suicide when a manic stranger, John (Tann), accidentally stops her from going through with it. Fearful that he has caused her injury, John pursues Mary until she relents and allows him to travel with her. Together, they hop a train and meet Israfel (Shepherd) and Providence (Jones), two other homeless people with a malevolent bent. Tensions build on the train car until Mary throws herself from the train in a second attempt at suicide. Jumping from black-and-white to color, the action moves from the train to a forest, where John unwillingly finds himself both taking care of Providence and searching for Mary. They stumble upon Henri Gatien (Kelly) who offers John much-needed cash to beat Providence, which John does, and in the process confronts his own past traumas.

To her shock, Mary discovers herself still alive at the edge of the railroad tracks. She tracks down John at the gas station at which they originally met and the two go searching for some form of peace. After a final encounter with Israfel at which Israfel attacks Mary and John strangles him, the protagonists struggle to stay alive. They manage to find solace at a drive-in theater and together make one final journey to the place of their dreams.

== Cast ==
- April Matthis as Mary
- Robbie Tann as John
- Scott Shepherd as Israfel
- O-Lan Jones as Providence
- David Patrick Kelly as Henri Gatien
- Travis Barrera as The Groundskeeper
- Joey Hood as Steve
- Soleil Patterson as Young Mary
- Sean Avery Huber as Young John

== Release and reception ==
Fugitive Dreams had its world premiere at Fantasia International Film Festival in Montreal, Canada, in 2020 as part of their pandemic oriented virtual festival. It was released digitally in 2024 by Freestyle Digital Media.

The film has a 100% approval rating on Rotten Tomatoes, based on 10 reviews. Film Threat called Fugitive Dreams "a Tom Waits song come to life ... a striking debut." Fugitive Dreams was listed as a Top 10 film in 2020 in The Austin Chronicle and won "Best Feature" in the 2021 NYCITFF.

== See also ==
- List of black-and-white films produced since 1966
