= Jac Cron =

American filmmaker

- Born: New York
- Occupations: Film director, screenwriter, photographer

Jac Cron is an American filmmaker best known for her feature debut, Chestnut.

== Early life and education ==
Cron was born and raised in New York.

She graduated from Drexel University.

== Career ==
In 2020, Cron's short film House Sit screened at the Philadelphia Independent Film Festival and the San Francisco Independent Film Festival. For that work she was awarded 'Best Director' prize at the Be Epic! London International Film Festival.

Cron's debut feature, Chestnut, starring Natalia Dyer, Rachel Keller, and Danny Ramirez as a love triangle, premiered at the 2023 Frameline Film Festival and was released in 2024.

== Personal life ==
Cron is a lesbian.

== Filmography ==
=== Film ===
List of Cron's films
Year	Title	Notes	Ref.
2020	House Sit	Short film	
2023	Chestnut	—N/a	

=== Music videos ===
List of Cron's music videos
Year	Artist	Title	Ref.
2021	douglas	Alter Ego	

== Accolades ==
List of Cron's awards and nominations
Year	Award or film festival	Category	Nominated work	Result	Ref.
2020	Be Epic! London International Film Festival	Best Director	House Sit	Won	
2023	Philadelphia Film Festival	Best Local Feature	Chestnut	Nominated	
