= Home (Secret Invasion) =

- Secret Invasion episode
- Episode no.: Episode 6
- Directed by: Ali Selim
- Written by: Kyle Bradstreet; Brian Tucker
- Cinematography by: Remi Adefarasin (Note: Eben Bolter served as the cinematographer during additional photography, which occurred over four months.)
- Editing by: Pete Beaudreau
- Original release date: July 26, 2023
- Running time: 38 minutes

Episode chronology
← Previous "Harvest"	Next → —

"Home" is the sixth episode and series finale of the American television series Secret Invasion, based on Marvel Comics comic book crossover Secret Invasion. It follows Nick Fury and G'iah's collective attempts to stop Gravik's plot to conquer Earth and Fury embracing his wife Priscilla as Varra. The episode is set in the Marvel Cinematic Universe (MCU), sharing continuity with the films of the franchise. It was written by Kyle Bradstreet and Brian Tucker, and directed by Ali Selim, who joined the series by May 2021.

Samuel L. Jackson reprises his role as Fury from previous MCU media, with Kingsley Ben-Adir, Emilia Clarke, Olivia Colman, and Don Cheadle also starring. Selim joined the series by May 2021 to direct all episodes.

"Home" was released on Disney+ on July 26, 2023. It received negative reviews from critics, who criticized the episode for failing to effectively resolve narrative threads, the action sequence between Gravik and G'iah, and various writing choices, but offered praise for the performances of Ben-Adir, Clarke, Colman, and Cheadle.

== Plot ==
Nick Fury confronts Gravik at New Skrullos, gives him the Harvest, and asks that he spare Earth and conquer other planets. Gravik refuses before using the Harvest to empower himself further and attempt to kill Fury, only to learn it was a disguised G'iah, who also used the Harvest. The two fight, with G'iah eventually killing Gravik. Meanwhile, Raava successfully convinces Ritson to authorize a nuclear strike on New Skrullos, but is tricked by Sonya Falsworth into arranging Ritson's evacuation. Raava attempts to retaliate, but is killed by Fury. Ritson calls off the strike, allowing G'iah to free Gravik's human prisoners, such as Everett K. Ross and James Rhodes. In the aftermath, Ritson issues a new bill declaring all off-world species as hostile forces and threatens to hunt down the remaining Skrulls on Earth, causing unrest as civilians publicly murder various high-profile officials for fear that they are Skrulls. Falsworth meets with G'iah and proposes a partnership to protect the Skrulls against Ritson's bill. Fury asks Varra to come to S.A.B.E.R. with him to help negotiate a peace summit with the Kree. She agrees and they leave Earth together.

== Production ==
=== Development ===
In September 2020, Kyle Bradstreet was revealed to be developing a television series for the streaming service Disney+ centered on Nick Fury, which was revealed that December to be Secret Invasion. Samuel L. Jackson was reprising his role as Fury, co-starring with Ben Mendelsohn in his MCU role of Talos. Ali Selim joined the series in May 2021 to direct, originally to split the episodes with Thomas Bezucha; Bezucha left the series before production began, and Selim ultimately directed all six episodes. Marvel Studios' Feige, Louis D'Esposito, Victoria Alonso, Brad Winderbaum, and Jonathan Schwartz served as executive producers on the series alongside Jackson, Selim, Bradstreet, and Brian Tucker. The sixth episode, titled "Home", was written by Bradstreet and Tucker, and was released on Disney+ on July 26, 2023.

=== Writing ===
Director Ali Selim had stated that the theme of the series was reconciling with the Other, feeling that the scene in which Nick Fury kisses Varra best epitomizes Fury releasing his sense of the "other" within himself. He had also been collaborating with Aaron Sowd and Ian McCaffrey to storyboard various sequences, particularly the one in which Gravik analyzes the superpowers from the vial taken from Fury on the computer, further explaining that the process had begun with Kevin Feige's approval, who had granted him creative freedom, then reworking it within the framework of the story while maintaining practicality. Additionally, he had also suggested that Raava could've been impersonating Colonel James "Rhodey" Rhodes since his spinal cord injury in Captain America: Civil War (2016), although he did not confirm whether this theory was true. Selim had also opted to make the episode focused on the dialogue between G'iah (impersonating Fury) and Gravik, with the intention of it being "two great actors finding their way through something that should feel like a fist fight, but ends up really being about blame, hurt, and apology — things you don't really think of in the MCU". Kingsley Ben-Adir and Selim had discussed the scene eight months prior to filming, in which Ben-Adir's and Selim's suggestions would reshape the dialogue and action components of the scene, respectively. Feige had also told Selim that "We're gonna have a Super Skrull fight and all superpowers are fair game", and as such had "a discussion of paper, scissors rock [sic]" to decide G'iah and Gravik's respective superpowers, with additional accommodations being made in order to make the choreography easier. The relationship between Varra and Fury had been described by Selim as being the "heart of the series", and said that Fury fully comes to terms with his love for her when he kisses her. He had also made the deliberate decision for President Ritson to sign a bill declaring war on the Skrulls as he believed that though Fury would accept the Skrulls, not everyone else would. President Ritson's decisions had allowed for him to specifically create an ending with "some real guts to it" while also establishing the idea that "this battle could go on" but it could also be resolved as Sonya and G'iah had reconciled afterwards. He had felt that their reconciliation can either be interpreted as a resolution for Secret Invasion or a cliffhanger setting up future MCU projects.

=== Casting ===
The episode stars Samuel L. Jackson as Nick Fury, Ben Mendelsohn as Talos, Kingsley Ben-Adir as Gravik, Emilia Clarke as G'iah, Olivia Colman as Sonya Falsworth, and Don Cheadle as James "Rhodey" Rhodes.

=== Filming and visual effects ===
Filming took place at Pinewood Studios, as well as Hallmark House, from September 2021 to April 2022, with Selim directing, and Remi Adefarasin serving as cinematographer. Eben Bolter served as the cinematographer during additional photography which lasted for four months. The final fight sequence between G'iah and Gravik had been primarily shot on location with minor components being shot with blue screens. The stunt team had also checked the storyboards of the sequence and had told which ones would be practical or not. Selim had opted to minimize the amount of Skrull powers used as it had required more visual effects works and he had sought to capture the actor's authentic performances. As Gravik had been the monster in the scene, he also had VFX meetings beforehand to ensure that Kingsley Ben-Adir's performance could be properly depicted. Emilia Clarke had been wire-flying for the moments in which G'iah flies during the sequence. The stunt team had difficulties in extricating her from the wires afterwards. She had also been on a stunt chariot, which was pulled by a car, for the sequence. Clarke had found it difficult executing the pose following G'iah's punch against Gravik, as it had required her to jump into place while recreating the movement of flying, calling it the "biggest anticlimactic move".

Visual effects were provided by Digital Domain, FuseFX, Luma Pictures, MARZ, One of Us, Zoic Studios, and Cantina Creative.

== Marketing ==
After the episode's release, Marvel announced merchandise inspired by the episode as part of its "Marvel Must Haves" promotion for the series, including a Funko Pop depicting Gravik's Super-Skrull form.

== Reception ==
=== Audience viewership ===
According to Whip Media's TV Time, Secret Invasion was the most watched original series across all platforms in the United States during the week of July 30, 2023. According to Nielsen Media Research who measure the number of minutes watched by United States audiences on television sets, Secret Invasion was the seventh-most watched original series across streaming services for the week of July 24–30, 2023, with 421 million minutes watched, which was an 2.4% increase from the previous week.

=== Critical response ===
The review aggregator website Rotten Tomatoes reports a 7% approval rating based on 14 reviews. The site's critical consensus reads "A huge miscalculation in emphasizing brawn over brain, this finale is so misjudged that most MCU fans will want to keep it secret from their collective memory."

Vulture's Jesse Hassenger gave the episode a 1/5. He called Fury's departure from Earth at the behest of President Ritson's request as being "a form of simultaneous self-containment and universe interconnection that cancel each other out: ... world-altering events that don't feel like they matter very much, occasionally pretending to be an exploration of a loving yet deeply complicated marriage". He also did not enjoy Gravik's monologue, feeling it to be derivative and having bad sound editing and disliked the subsequent action sequence between Gravik and G'iah, heavily disliking the CGI. Hassenger thought President Ritson's declaration of war against Skrulls to be a big development, moreso than the moments of the episode's ending, but felt that Sonya and G'iah's reconciliation minimized the impact of the decision, which he felt tried to parallel the "echo of Trump-era (or post-Trump) violence and unrest". Ultimately, he opined that the show's supposed focus on Fury and Varra's relationship had been artificial towards the ends, but enjoyed the writing of the scene in which Fury had called her. Bradley Russell, writing for Total Film, commended Kingsley Ben-Adir's performance during the scene in which he receives The Harvest and wished that Gravik taking on the form of the first human he killed be revealed earlier, as he thought it was a "compelling" idea, but rued that it was "instead painted more as a black-and-white, good versus evil dichotomy than in various shades of gray". However, the revelation of Fury to be G'iah had "retroactively robbed" the "intensity" of the scene and also concurred with Hassenger that the final action sequence was "disappointing" and enjoyed President Ritson's declaration of war against the Skrulls, but unlike Hassenger, felt that Sonya and G'iah's reconciliation could "easily be picked up down the line in a stronger, more robust series". He rated the episode 2 stars out of 5. Like Hassenger and Russell, Kirsten Howard from Den of Geek criticized G'iah's dialogue with Gravik and the CGI of the subsequent action sequence. She also deemed the resolution to be underwhelming due to its lack of "wild finale twists", feeling that the sudden revelation of the Kree wanting to host peace talks with the Skrulls to be "sweeping the issues under the rug" and that the series' overall plot would not be alluded to in future MCU projects. However, she praised the performances of Colman, Jackson, and Cheadle and felt the episode made an honest attempt at exploring "some political and sociological ideas about the plight of refugees and the way we respond to people we consider to be outsiders", going on to give it 1.5 out of 5 stars.

Giving the episode an F grade, Sam Barsanti of The A.V. Club agreed with Howard's sentiment that the MCU would not explore the ramifications of the plot in future stories and felt it was a "mixed bag here, in terms of successes". He interpreted Fury's "happy ending" to be a Pyrrhic victory, as Talos had died and President Ritson had effectively caused a genocide against all extraterrestrial beings on Earth while opining that James Rhodes being a Skrull was futile as there was no proof in the episode that he had been so prior to Avengers: Endgame (2019) and felt the indication that he had been in the Skrull pod for a "long time" being vague. Daniel Chin's review for The Ringer stated that it was "one of the MCU's worst TV finales" and that it "sticks to the MCU finale playbook at nearly every turn", and that it left viewers with more questions than answers. He felt that Gravik was not as smart as he had been in previous episodes, being "shortsighted", and called the buildup to Gravik and G'iah's fight "uninspired", but enjoyed seeing the various powers depicted in the battle. In Chin's broader analysis of the episode, he thought it left many unresolved narrative threads and that Rhodes being a Skrull retconned his MCU's character arc and that its "clumsy storytelling" did not contain any impact. He ultimately stated that "the finale neither justifies Secret Invasion's existence as a self-contained show nor establishes the series' centrality to the MCU" and felt that The Marvels (2023) would ignore the series' events, opining that it would "go down as a massive (and oddly expensive) missed opportunity in what will likely be his [Fury's] one and only solo project". CNN's senior writer Brian Lowry felt that while some of the series' merits were "ably featured" in the episodes, including Colman and Clarke's performances, but also thought that it had not effectively concluded some narrative threads, and thought that the episode would not effectively contextualize The Marvels the way WandaVision (2021) helped establish context for Doctor Strange in the Multiverse of Madness (2022) and how The Falcon and the Winter Soldier (2021) would help establish upcoming film Captain America: Brave New World (2025).
