= Resurrection (Secret Invasion) =

- Secret Invasion episode
- Promotional poster
- Episode no.: Episode 1
- Directed by: Ali Selim
- Written by: Kyle Bradstreet; Brian Tucker
- Cinematography by: Remi Adefarasin (Note: Eben Bolter served as the cinematographer during additional photography, which occurred over four months.)
- Editing by: Pete Beaudreau
- Original release date: June 21, 2023
- Running time: 55 minutes

Cast
- Cobie Smulders as Maria Hill; Martin Freeman as Everett K. Ross; Uriel Emil as Vasily Poprishchin; Tony Curran as Derrik; Irmena Chichikova as Kreega; Ben Peel as Brogan; Mark Lewis as Zirksu

Episode chronology
← Previous —	Next → "Promises"

"Resurrection" is the first episode of the American television series Secret Invasion, based on the Marvel Comics comic book crossover of the same name. It features a rebellious faction of shapeshifting aliens, the Skrulls, plotting an insurgency on Earth after Nick Fury had failed to find another planet for them. The episode is set in the Marvel Cinematic Universe (MCU), sharing continuity with the films of the franchise. It was written by head writer Kyle Bradstreet and Brian Tucker, and directed by Ali Selim.

Samuel L. Jackson reprises his role as Fury from previous MCU media, along with Ben Mendelsohn as Talos, with Kingsley Ben-Adir, Killian Scott, Samuel Adewunmi, Dermot Mulroney, Richard Dormer, Emilia Clarke, Olivia Colman, and Don Cheadle also starring. Selim joined the series by May 2021 to direct all episodes.

"Resurrection" was released on Disney+ on June 21, 2023. Its critical reception was mixed, with praise for its pacing, performances, and potential, but criticism for its reliance on past MCU elements, lack of cohesive narratives, and lack of authentic tension.

== Plot ==
In Moscow, Talos pursues Everett K. Ross for killing CIA agent Prescod, who theorized shapeshifting Skrull rebels – furious with Talos and Nick Fury's lack of progress in finding them a new homeworld – are plotting to incite war between Russia and the United States and take over Earth. Maria Hill arrives to assist Ross, but discovers he is a Skrull and calls Fury, who has been working in space for years following the Blip. Returning to Earth to meet with Talos, Fury learns the latter has been exiled from the Skrull Council and former ally Gravik has taken a leadership position with the rebels. Fury is kidnapped by MI6 agents and taken to meet old acquaintance, Sonya Falsworth. He proposes an alliance to stop Gravik, but she refuses. Using a bug to eavesdrop on her and the United Kingdom's Prime Minister, Fury and Talos locate another rebel, Vasily Poprishchin, but Fury kills Poprishchin after failing to interrogate him. Talos reunites with his daughter G'iah, who has joined the rebels and worked with Poprishchin to acquire dirty bombs for them. After he claims Gravik killed her mother Soren, G'iah reveals the rebels plan to attack Vossoyedineniye Square on Unity Day and marks the bombs' locations. However, Fury, Hill, and Talos discover the locations are decoys before Gravik detonates the bombs. In the ensuing chaos, Hill is shot by Gravik disguised as Fury. The real Fury and Talos are forced to flee and abandon her.

== Production ==
=== Development ===
In September 2020, Kyle Bradstreet was revealed to be developing a television series for the streaming service Disney+ centered on Nick Fury, which was revealed that December to be Secret Invasion. Samuel L. Jackson was reprising his role as Fury, co-starring with Ben Mendelsohn in his MCU role of Talos. Ali Selim joined the series in May 2021 to direct, originally to split the episodes with Thomas Bezucha; Bezucha left the series before production began, and Selim ultimately directed all six episodes. Marvel Studios' Feige, Louis D'Esposito, Victoria Alonso, Brad Winderbaum, and Jonathan Schwartz served as executive producers on the series alongside Jackson, Selim, Bradstreet, and Brian Tucker. The first episode, titled "Resurrection", was written by Bradstreet and Tucker.

=== Writing ===
Cobie Smulders was aware of Maria Hill's death in the episode during her initial discussions with Marvel Studios to join the series. She called it "strange and kind of dark" for Gravik disguised as Fury to be the one to shoot Hill, to then be followed "by a very emotional moment" between Hill and Fury that featured "the regret and the worry and the pain of the loss that was happening".

=== Design ===
Hill has a more casual look with jeans and t-shirts in the episode, which evolved from her earliest appearances in the Avengers films that Smulders called a "glossy and ready for action" look of platform knee-high boots and a skintight leotard.

=== Casting ===
The episode stars Samuel L. Jackson as Nick Fury, Ben Mendelsohn as Talos, Kingsley Ben-Adir as Gravik, Killian Scott as Pagon, Samuel Adewunmi as Beto, Dermot Mulroney as Ritson, Richard Dormer as Prescod, Emilia Clarke as G'iah, Olivia Colman as Sonya Falsworth, and Don Cheadle as James "Rhodey" Rhodes. Also appearing are Cobie Smulders as Maria Hill, Martin Freeman as Everett K. Ross, Uriel Emil as Vasily Poprishchin, Tony Curran as Derrik, Irmena Chichikova as Kreega, Ben Peel as Brogan, and Mark Lewis as Zirksu.

=== Filming and visual effects ===
Filming took place at Pinewood Studios, as well as Hallmark House, from September 2021 to April 2022, with Selim directing, and Remi Adefarasin serving as cinematographer. Eben Bolter served as the cinematographer during additional photography which lasted for four months. Filming occurred in Halifax at Piece Hall from January 24 to 31, 2022, which served as the location for the end of the episode when Gravik detonates the bombs in Moscow.

Selim explained that the forehead greeting between the Skrulls was created through "an exploration of what might be different" with Jackson and Mendelsohn, understanding that since the Skrull race was not from Earth, they would likely not shake hands. The final scene that Smulders filmed was the death of Maria Hill, which required three takes to finish. During production of the scene, Marvel Studios also chased down drones that attempted to capture footage of filming. In each take, Smulders had looked Jackson in the eye, stating that she did that to capture the emotion of the moment as "to know that Hill thinks that Fury shot her—that's the pain of that moment" while also personally opining that she thought Hill had eventually known that it was not actually Fury who shot her.

Visual effects for the episode were created by Zoic Studios, Barnstorm VFX, Tippett Studio, SDFX Studios, FuseFX, Cantina Creative, Luma Pictures, Base FX, Bot VFX, and Digital Domain.

== Marketing ==
After the episode's release, Marvel announced merchandise inspired by the episode as part of its weekly "Marvel Must Haves" promotion for each episode of the series, including Fury Funko Pops, Rock 'Em Socks, Skrull T-shirts, 6-inch figures of Fury and Talos, and one Build-a-Figure part.

== Release ==
"Resurrection" was released on Disney+ on June 21, 2023, and was made available on Hulu along with the second and third episodes from July 21 to August 17, 2023.

== Reception ==
=== Audience viewership ===
The viewer tracking application Samba TV reported that the episode was watched by an estimated 994,000 U.S. households during its first five days of release. It also noted that African-American households had over-indexed on the show. According to the streaming aggregator Reelgood, Secret Invasion was the most watched program across all platforms in the United States during the week of June 22, 2023. According to Whip Media's TV Time, Secret Invasion was the most watched original series across all platforms in the United States during the week of June 25, 2023. According to Nielsen Media Research who measure the number of minutes watched by United States audiences on television sets, Secret Invasion was the fifth-most watched original series across streaming services for the week of June 19–25, 2023, with 461 million minutes watched, which was equivalent to about 8.54 million full viewings of the premiere.

=== Critical reception ===
The review aggregator website Rotten Tomatoes reports a 55% approval rating based on 22 reviews. The site's critical consensus reads, "It's good to see Samuel L. Jackson's Nick Fury again after an extended exodus, but this premiere's plodding setup gets Secret Invasion off to a curiously inert start."

Giving the episode a rating of 3/5, Jesse Hassenger from Vulture praised the pacing of the episode, but also felt that the "cloak-and-dagger stuff is coasting on novelty". He anticipated the prospect of the series exploring a new aspect of the MCU, but noted that it could be "assimilated as a Skrull in hiding". Meanwhile, Franz Ruiz of Space.com felt the spy tone both had a good and bad side. He positively remarked that it paralleled the plot of The X-Files but also complained that it "seems too self-serious and a bit scattered". He also enjoyed the performances and characters, highlighting Fury's scenes and his "strained relationship" with other characters, and calling Colman's performance his favorite in the episode. Additionally, Ruiz also noted that many of the major characters, as featured in the marketing campaign, were already present in the episode, feeling that it's a rather "strange" decision as it made the episode felt "disjointed and jittery" but also setting up enough plot elements for the future episodes. He concluded by saying that though it was a "decaffeinated version of better show openers", it had more potential than other TV series. The Ringer's Daniel Chin wrote that the opening scene had established the tone, but the death of the Skrull chased by Talos prior to the opening credits had not been the "riveting hook that creator Kyle Bradstreet and director Ali Selim likely intended to be". Like Ruiz, he also felt that the episode showed "plenty of potential in its opening salvo", but criticized the pacing as he felt it did not properly explore the characters and the series should instead slow down to individually focus on specific narratives. Furthermore, he thought the episode had introduced too much information and had not dealt with the psychological aspect of its protagonist to the extent of other shows such as WandaVision (2021) and Hawkeye (2021), feeling that it instead "reheats a snippet of the stinger shown after the credits of Captain Marvel before carrying on". Concluding his overall mixed review, he noted that the episode was too reliant on the MCU's past, as it had built upon elements from previous MCU films, and hoped Hill's death would help the series become more "captivating".

At The Daily Beast, Fletcher Peters compared the show's tone to that of The Falcon and the Winter Soldier (2021). She did not like the Skrull storyline, calling it "dead in the water", and opined that Fury's personal struggles were more interesting than the relationship between Talos and G'iah, and wanted the series to focus the most on that one. Peters also stated that she enjoyed the dialogue and dynamics between Falsworth and Fury. Kirsten Howard, from Den of Geek, gave the episode 2.5 out of 5 stars. She felt that it would appeal more to people familiar with the MCU, as the revelation of Ross being a Skrull and Hill's death would have more impact, while also feeling that Hill's death was unnecessary and a "mirthless injustice for Smulders' ... tenure in the Marvel movies". Noting that while it's a "slow burn process", she felt that the show would have difficulty in setting up a climax due to it taking place a few years after Captain Marvel, and was not surprised by the events of the episode due to the marketing of the episode. Matt Purslow, writing for IGN, gave the first two episodes an 8/10, primarily remarking that he felt the premise lacked "authentic tension" as many characters were already revealed to be Skrulls while also expressing concern of the show's concept provided that it's not heavily reliant on the 2008 comic book storyline of the same name by Brian Michael Bendis. However, he also praised the characters, feeling that Fury and his Skrulls "provide murky layers to this thriller", Colman's performance was unique and memorable, and expressing pleasure with Gravik's character, although he wished Gravik had more screen-time to develop his character. He concluded by saying that the show "indulge[d] in the genre's grime" and compared its visual style to that of Captain America: The Winter Soldier (2014) allowing it to have a unique tone compared to other MCU projects.
