= Beloved (Secret Invasion) =

- Secret Invasion episode
- Promotional poster
- Episode no.: Episode 4
- Directed by: Ali Selim
- Written by: Brian Tucker
- Cinematography by: Remi Adefarasin (Note: Eben Bolter served as the cinematographer during additional photography, which occurred over four months.)
- Editing by: Melissa Lawson Cheung
- Original release date: July 12, 2023
- Running time: 38 minutes

Episode chronology
← Previous "Betrayed"	Next → "Harvest"

"Beloved" is the fourth episode of the American television series Secret Invasion, based on Marvel Comics comic book crossover Secret Invasion. It features Nick Fury conflicting with his wife, Priscilla, and discovering James Rhodes to be a Skrull while trying to rescue the United States President Ritson. The episode is set in the Marvel Cinematic Universe (MCU), sharing continuity with the films of the franchise. It was written by Brian Tucker, and directed by Ali Selim, who joined the series by May 2021.

Samuel L. Jackson reprises his role as Fury from previous MCU media, along with Ben Mendelsohn as Talos, with Kingsley Ben-Adir, Emilia Clarke, Olivia Colman, and Don Cheadle also starring. Selim joined the series by May 2021 to direct all episodes.

"Beloved" was released on Disney+ on July 12, 2023.

== Plot ==
G'iah recovers from her wound, having previously used Gravik's machine to power herself up with Extremis DNA. She reunites with Talos, who reveals that he plans to ask the United States President, Ritson, to help the Skrulls after they successfully stop the rebels, which disappoints her. Priscilla meets with James Rhodes, who is revealed to be a Skrull in disguise, as the latter instructs her to kill Nick Fury. Both of them are unaware that Fury was listening in on their conversation. Fury later confronts Priscilla over her allegiance, but they make amends after Priscilla reveals she took an oath to her human counterpart to never harm her lover. Fury visits the fake Rhodes and shares a drink with him, which acts as a liquid tracker. Fury and Talos then follow him, as he goes to pick up President Ritson. Gravik and the Skrull rebels attack Ritson's convoy under the guise of Russian terrorists. Fury and Talos, with the aid of the British Army, extract an unconscious Ritson, but Talos is injured and ultimately killed by Gravik.

== Production ==
=== Development ===
In September 2020, Kyle Bradstreet was revealed to be developing a television series for the streaming service Disney+ centered on Nick Fury, which was revealed that December to be Secret Invasion. Samuel L. Jackson was reprising his role as Fury, co-starring with Ben Mendelsohn in his MCU role of Talos. Ali Selim joined the series in May 2021 to direct, originally to split the episodes with Thomas Bezucha; Bezucha left the series before production began, and Selim ultimately directed all six episodes. Marvel Studios' Feige, Louis D'Esposito, Victoria Alonso, Brad Winderbaum, and Jonathan Schwartz served as executive producers on the series alongside Jackson, Selim, Bradstreet, and Brian Tucker. The fourth episode, titled "Beloved", was written by Tucker, and was released on Disney+ on July 12, 2023.

=== Writing ===
In the episode, Nick Fury eventually deduces that James "Rhodey" Rhodes is a Skrull. Cheadle said that "It's fun to fold that in and know that that's what's happening underneath all of those Rhodey scenes", and felt that as such, the relationship between Rhodes and Fury becomes a "sort of a cat-and-mouse game between the two of them, about what he has on Fury and if he's going to release information about Fury" while noting that Fury had to be careful so as to not get compromised while also trying to protect Earth from a Skrull insurgency. Meanwhile, Feige had explained that "We needed to have a character that one would not expect to be a Skrull", and that Cheadle was enthusiastic to explore the idea after they had pitched it to him early on.

=== Casting ===
The episode stars Samuel L. Jackson as Nick Fury, Ben Mendelsohn as Talos, Kingsley Ben-Adir as Gravik, Emilia Clarke as G'iah, Olivia Colman as Sonya Falsworth, and Don Cheadle as James "Rhodey" Rhodes.

=== Filming and visual effects ===
Filming took place at Pinewood Studios, as well as Hallmark House, from September 2021 to April 2022, with Selim directing, and Remi Adefarasin serving as cinematographer. Eben Bolter served as the cinematographer during additional photography which lasted for four months. The action sequence in which Gravik and his Skrull rebels attack President Ritson's motorcade was filmed with practical effects. Actor Dermot Mulroney had shot the scene in which Ritson's armored SUV was hit with a missile, which was filmed with Mulroney being attached to a car-sized gimbal that then rotated. The stunt crew had tested it for safety beforehand, while Mulroney had filmed the scenes during what he approximated as one of his first days with Samuel L. Jackson.

Visual effects were provided by One of Us, SDFX Studios, Lola VFX, Base FX, FuseFX, Bot VFX, Tippet Studio, Luma, and Cantina Creative.

== Reception ==
=== Audience viewership ===
According to Nielsen Media Research who measure the number of minutes watched by United States audiences on television sets, Secret Invasion was the ninth-most watched original series across streaming services for the week of July 10–16, 2023, with 347 million minutes watched, which was an 18.5% decrease from the previous week.

=== Critical response ===
The review aggregator website Rotten Tomatoes reports a 38% approval rating based on 13 reviews.

Writing for IGN, Matt Purslow rated the episode a 5 out of 10. He felt that the episode's plot developments had felt "muted", as they had either not been developed enough or had already alluded to based on elements from previous episodes. He was critical of the script, calling the dialogue between Fury and Priscilla to be "corny rather than authentic", but felt that the scene between Fury and Rhodes was better. Additionally, he felt the darker color palette had contradicted the episode's inclusion of humor, commenting "it still feels the need to deliver on the franchise's seemingly mandatory comedy quota". Jesse Hassenger of Vulture, giving the episode 2 stars out of 5, felt the script had undermined the potential of the episode, disliking the fact that G'iah was revealed to be alive, while feeling that scenes between Fury and Priscilla weren't "especially adept at conveying the fullness of a decade-long marriage and longer-than-that partnership" and relied on too much exposition.
