= Secret Invasion (miniseries) =

2023 Marvel Studios television miniseries

- Genre: Action-adventure; Spy thriller; Science fiction; Superhero
- Created by: Kyle Bradstreet
- Based on: Marvel Comics
- Directed by: Ali Selim
- Starring: Samuel L. Jackson; Ben Mendelsohn; Kingsley Ben-Adir; Killian Scott; Samuel Adewunmi; Dermot Mulroney; Richard Dormer; Emilia Clarke; Olivia Colman; Don Cheadle; Charlayne Woodard; Christopher McDonald; Katie Finneran
- Music by: Kris Bowers
- Country of origin: United States
- Original language: English
- No. of seasons: 1
- No. of episodes: 6

Production
- Executive producers: Brian Tucker; Kyle Bradstreet; Ali Selim; Samuel L. Jackson; Brad Winderbaum; Victoria Alonso; Louis D'Esposito; Kevin Feige; Jonathan Schwartz
- Production location: England
- Cinematography: Remi Adefarasin (Note: Eben Bolter served as the cinematographer during additional photography, which occurred over four months.)
- Editors: Pete Beaudreau; Melissa Lawson Cheung; Jim Stanger
- Running time: 35–58 minutes
- Production company: Marvel Studios
- Budget: $212 million

Original release
- Network: Disney+
- Release: June 21 – July 26, 2023

Related
- Marvel Cinematic Universe television series

Secret Invasion is an American television miniseries created by Kyle Bradstreet for the streaming service Disney+, based on the 2008 Marvel Comics storyline "Secret Invasion". It is the ninth television series in the Marvel Cinematic Universe (MCU) produced by Marvel Studios, sharing continuity with the films of the franchise. It follows Nick Fury and Talos as they uncover a conspiracy by a group of shapeshifting Skrulls to conquer Earth. Bradstreet serves as the head writer, with Ali Selim directing.

Samuel L. Jackson and Ben Mendelsohn reprise their respective roles as Fury and Talos from previous MCU media, with Kingsley Ben-Adir, Killian Scott, Samuel Adewunmi, Dermot Mulroney, Richard Dormer, Emilia Clarke, Olivia Colman, Don Cheadle, Charlayne Woodard, Christopher McDonald, and Katie Finneran also starring. Development on the series began by September 2020, with Bradstreet and Jackson attached. The title and premise of the series, along with Mendelsohn's return, were revealed that December. Additional casting occurred throughout March and April 2021, followed by the hiring of Selim and Thomas Bezucha that May to direct the series. Filming began in London by September 2021 and wrapped in late April 2022, with additional filming around England. During production, much of the series' creative team was replaced, with Brian Tucker taking over as writer from Bradstreet and Bezucha exiting, and extensive reshoots took place from mid-June to late September 2022.

Secret Invasion premiered on June 21, 2023, and ran for six episodes until July 26. It is the first series in Phase Five of the MCU. The series received mixed reviews from critics, who praised Jackson's and Mendelsohn's performances but criticized the writing (particularly that of the finale), pacing, and visual effects.

== Premise ==
Nick Fury works with Talos, a shapeshifting alien Skrull, to uncover a conspiracy by a group of renegade Skrulls led by Gravik who plan to gain control of Earth by posing as different humans around the world.

== Cast and characters ==
- Samuel L. Jackson as Nick Fury:
  The former director of S.H.I.E.L.D. who has been working with the Skrulls in space for years before returning to Earth. Fury has been away from Earth so long in part because he is worn out and uncertain of his place in the world following the events of the films Avengers: Infinity War (2018) and Avengers: Endgame (2019). Jackson said the series would delve deeper into Fury's past and future, and allowed him to "explore something other than the badassery of who Nick Fury is" including the toll of his job on his personal life. He continued that Secret Invasion allowed him to work out some new elements of the character that his previous appearances in the Marvel Cinematic Universe (MCU) had not. Executive producer Jonathan Schwartz added that "sins from [Fury's] past start to haunt him once again" given the things he had to do to protect Earth in the past have ramifications.
- Ben Mendelsohn as Talos: The former leader of the Skrulls and an ally of Fury. Mendelsohn noted how Talos, along with Fury, have "lost their way" and are "up against it" since he was last seen in the film Captain Marvel (2019).
- Kingsley Ben-Adir as Gravik:
  The leader of a group of rebel Skrulls who has broken away from Talos and believe the best way to help their kind is to infiltrate Earth for the resources they need. He sets up his operation in a decommissioned radioactive site in Russia, and has a hatred for most of the Skrulls working for him, believing them to be idiots. Ben-Adir worked to find the proper level of hatred to portray in each scene, since he felt Gravik trusts no one and hates everyone but still needs the other Skrulls to accomplish his goals. Director Ali Selim said Gravik was not a terrorist or "just a bad guy with a bomb" and the series would explore the reasons for his actions. Lucas Persaud portrays Gravik as a child.
- Killian Scott as Pagon: A rebel Skrull and Gravik's second-in-command. Ben-Adir said Gravik sees that Pagon has ambition and wants to be a leader, but "he doesn't have the guts to take it". Scott also portrays the human counterpart whose form Pagon took in the final episode.
- Samuel Adewunmi as Beto: A rebel Skrull recruit.
- Dermot Mulroney as Ritson: The president of the United States.
- Richard Dormer as Prescod: A former S.H.I.E.L.D. agent who uncovered the Skrulls' plan to invade Earth.
- Emilia Clarke as G'iah:
  Talos's daughter who works for Gravik. Clarke described G'iah as having "a kind of punk feeling" to her, adding that being a refugee had "hardened her". She resents Fury since he has not been able to deliver on the promises he made in Captain Marvel to find the Skrulls a new home. Clarke worked with Mendelsohn to create G'iah and Talos's backstory to "fill in a lot of the gaps", with Clarke believing G'iah would have had an "upbringing that was regimented with training" since the Skrulls are a warring species, that would have led to a "fierce need for her own independence" while judging some of Talos's choices. G'iah was previously portrayed as a child in Captain Marvel by Auden L. Ophuls and Harriet L. Ophuls.
- Olivia Colman as Sonya Falsworth:
  A high-ranking MI6 agent and an old ally of Fury's who looks to protect the United Kingdom's national security interests during the invasion. Described as "a more antagonistic presence" in the series, Schwartz said Falsworth could be working either with or against Fury depending on their desired goals, with Jackson calling the two "frenemies". Jackson added that Colman's portrayal of Falsworth changed her dynamic with Fury, since she played the character "cozy and fuzzy" rather than contentious, which allowed for the two to "work together in a harmony that's more satisfying to the story and our backstory than any other way".
- Don Cheadle as Raava / James "Rhodey" Rhodes:
  A female Skrull posing as Rhodes (an officer in the U.S. Air Force and an Avenger) who serves as an envoy and advisor to President Ritson. Nisha Aaliya portrays Raava in her Skrull form. Jackson said Rhodes would be a "political animal" in the series rather than using the War Machine armor. Cheadle noted that this made Rhodes more of an adversary than in his previous MCU appearances, with the character caught between being "a military man following the chain of command" and someone who can go "outside the box". Once Fury becomes aware that Rhodes has been replaced by a Skrull, Cheadle felt the two enter "sort of a cat-and-mouse game" with each having compromising info on the other. The real Rhodes is ultimately released from his Skrull containment pod at the end of the series.
- Charlayne Woodard as Varra / Priscilla Davis: A Skrull who is the wife of Nick Fury and has a history with Gravik. Varra took the likeness of Dr. Priscilla Davis who was suffering from a congenital heart defect.
- Christopher McDonald as Chris Stearns: A Skrull posing as an FXN news host and member of the Skrull council. The character was based on real-life newscaster Tucker Carlson and the Fox News channel.
- Katie Finneran as Rosa Dalton: A scientist replaced by a Skrull that is researching various DNA samples for the Harvest project.

Reprising their MCU roles are Cobie Smulders as Maria Hill, Martin Freeman as Everett K. Ross, and O-T Fagbenle as Rick Mason. The first episode reveals that Ross had been replaced by a Skrull infiltrator, and also features Hill's death. Smulders had been aware of the character's death during her initial discussions to join the series. Tony Curran appears as Derrik Weatherby, the director of MI6 who was replaced by a Skrull. Curran previously portrayed Bor in the film Thor: The Dark World (2013) and Finn Cooley in the second season of Daredevil (2016). Also appearing are Ben Peel as Brogan, a rebel Skrull who is tortured by Falsworth; Seeta Indrani as Shirley Sagar, Christopher Goh as Jack Hyuk-Bin, Giampiero Judica as NATO Secretary General Sergio Caspani, and Anna Madeley as the UK prime minister Pamela Lawton, all members of the Skrull Council; Juliet Stevenson as Maria Hill's mother Elizabeth; and Charlotte Baker and Kate Braithwaite as Soren, the wife of Talos and mother of G'iah who was killed by Gravik; Baker portrays Soren's human disguise while Braithwaite portrays her Skrull appearance. Soren was previously portrayed by Sharon Blynn in Captain Marvel and the film Spider-Man: Far From Home (2019).

== Episodes ==
No.	Title	Directed by	Written by	Original release date
1	"Resurrection"	Ali Selim	Kyle Bradstreet and Brian Tucker	June 21, 2023
In Moscow, Talos pursues Everett K. Ross for killing CIA agent Prescod, who theorized that shapeshifting Skrull rebels—frustrated that Talos and Nick Fury have not found them a new home planet—intend to incite war between Russia and the United States to take over Earth. Maria Hill arrives to assist Ross, but discovers that he is a Skrull. She calls Fury, who has been working in space for years following the Blip. (Note: As depicted in the film Spider-Man: Far From Home (2019)) Returning to Earth, Fury learns that Talos has been exiled from the Skrull Council and replaced by former ally Gravik, the rebels' leader. Fury is kidnapped by MI6 agents working for his old acquaintance Sonya Falsworth, who refuses to work with Fury to stop Gravik. Using a bug to eavesdrop on her, Fury and Talos locate the Skrulls who procured dirty bombs for the rebels, including Talos's daughter G'iah. After Talos reveals that her mother Soren was killed by the rebels, G'iah reveals the rebels' plan to attack Vossoyedineniye Square on Unity Day. Fury, Hill, and Talos fail to intercept the bombs before Gravik detonates them. In the ensuing chaos, Gravik disguises himself as Fury and kills Hill.
2	"Promises"	Ali Selim	Teleplay by : Brian Tucker; Story by : Brant Englestein and Brian Tucker	June 28, 2023
In 1997, (Note: Two years after the events of Captain Marvel (2019)) Fury recruits several Skrull refugees, including a young, orphaned Gravik, in exchange for helping them find a new home planet. In the present, Talos reveals to Fury that a million Skrulls are living on Earth. As the U.S. is implicated in the bombing, Gravik meets with the Skrull Council and gains majority support to lead the Skrulls in a new war. Dissenting councilwoman Shirley Sagar contacts Talos to arrange a meeting between him and Gravik. In London, Fury meets with Colonel James Rhodes to explain the situation, but Rhodes discharges Fury and blames him for the bombing and Hill's death. Falsworth interrogates an imprisoned rebel, Brogan, who reveals that Gravik is building a machine capable of strengthening the Skrulls with help from a scientist couple, the Daltons. G'iah discovers that the rebels are experimenting with powered DNA before accompanying Gravik to kill Brogan. Fury returns home and is met by his wife, a Skrull named Varra who has taken on the human identity, Priscilla Davis.
3	"Betrayed"	Ali Selim	Roxanne Paredes and Brian Tucker	July 5, 2023
Gravik reveals to the Skrull Council that he intends to create Super-Skrulls with special abilities using the powered DNA, having used himself as the first successful test subject. He also explains that he has sent rebels to infiltrate the Royal Navy to launch missiles at a United Nations aircraft. Gravik meets with Talos to negotiate a parlay, but the discussion breaks down when the former threatens to kill G'iah. G'iah secretly sends Talos information about the Royal Navy attack. Fury, angry that Talos allowed so many Skrulls to infiltrate Earth, reluctantly asks Talos to help him stop Gravik. They contact Falsworth and learn the name of the Naval Command Headquarters' officer in charge, Commodore Robert Fairbanks. Fury and Talos break into Fairbanks's home and interrogate him, learning that he is a Skrull. After he provokes Talos into killing him, Talos contacts G'iah, who acquires Fairbanks's authorization code so they can abort the missile launch in time. G'iah attempts to run away, but Gravik—who suspected her of betrayal—shoots her and leaves her for dead. Meanwhile, Varra secretly contacts an unknown person, wishing to speak to Gravik, but is denied.
4	"Beloved"	Ali Selim	Brian Tucker	July 12, 2023
Before she attempted to run away from the rebels, G'iah used Gravik's machine to empower herself with Extremis abilities. This allows her to recover from Gravik's gunshot and meet with Talos. He explains to her that he is planning to ask United States President Ritson to help the Skrulls after they successfully stop the rebels, which disappoints G'iah, who hoped for a stronger plan to find them a new home. Varra meets with Rhodes—a disguised Skrull named Raava—and is instructed by the latter to kill Fury. Having secretly listened to their conversation, Fury confronts Varra over this, but they reconcile after she reveals that she took an oath to her human counterpart to never harm her lover. Fury visits Raava and shares a drink with her, secretly planting a liquid tracker. Fury and Talos then follow Raava as she picks up Ritson for talks with Russia. Gravik and the rebels attack Ritson's convoy disguised as Russian terrorists. Fury and Talos extract an unconscious Ritson, but Gravik kills Talos in the process.
5	"Harvest"	Ali Selim	Michael Bhim and Brian Tucker	July 19, 2023
Following their failed attack on Ritson, the rebels start to lose faith in Gravik for not killing Fury and his perceived deception towards them. Beto, a new recruit, leads a small group in mounting a mutiny, but Gravik kills them all. Meanwhile, Fury gets Ritson to a hospital and confronts Raava, but she reveals that she leaked footage of Hill's death, placing Fury on a global watchlist. Fury later meets with G'iah, who reveals Gravik is looking for the "Harvest". After exposing her superior Derrik Weatherby as a Skrull, Falsworth locates Dr. Rosa Dalton, another disguised Skrull, and questions her about Gravik's DNA machine. Raava shows Ritson pictures of Gravik's Russian base New Skrullos to implicate Russia as Skrull sympathizers and advise a strike on the compound. Gravik calls Fury, offering to call off the strike if he brings him the "Harvest" in person. G'iah and Varra hold a funeral for Talos and fend off an attack by Gravik's men. In Finland, Fury leads Falsworth to a grave marked with his name which contains the "Harvest", a collection of DNA from the superheroes who fought during the Battle of Earth. (Note: As depicted in the film Avengers: Endgame (2019)) Fury takes the Harvest and prepares to confront Gravik.
6	"Home"	Ali Selim	Kyle Bradstreet and Brian Tucker	July 26, 2023
Fury confronts Gravik at New Skrullos, gives him the Harvest, and asks that he spare Earth and conquer other planets. Gravik refuses before using the Harvest to empower himself and attempt to kill Fury, only to learn it is a disguised G'iah, who also used the Harvest. The two fight, with G'iah eventually killing Gravik. Meanwhile, Raava successfully convinces Ritson to authorize a nuclear strike on New Skrullos, but is tricked by Falsworth into arranging for Ritson's evacuation. Raava attempts to retaliate, but is killed by Fury. Ritson calls off the strike, allowing G'iah to free Gravik's human prisoners, such as Ross and Rhodes. In the aftermath, Ritson issues a new bill declaring all off-world species as hostile forces and threatens to hunt down the remaining Skrulls on Earth, causing unrest as civilians publicly murder various high-profile officials for fear that they are Skrulls. Falsworth meets with G'iah and proposes a partnership to protect the Skrulls against Ritson's bill. After cautioning Ritson about the unrest he caused, Fury asks Varra to come to S.A.B.E.R. with him to help negotiate at a peace summit with the Kree. She agrees and they leave Earth together.

== Production ==
=== Development ===
In September 2020, Kyle Bradstreet was revealed to be developing a television series for the streaming service Disney+ centered on the Marvel Comics character Nick Fury. The character had previously been one of ten properties announced in September 2005 by Marvel Entertainment chairman and CEO Avi Arad as being developed for film by the newly formed studio Marvel Studios, after Marvel received financing to produce the slate of films to be distributed by Paramount Pictures; Andrew W. Marlowe was hired to write a script for a Nick Fury film in April 2006. In April 2019, after Samuel L. Jackson had portrayed Nick Fury in ten Marvel Cinematic Universe (MCU) films as well as the Marvel Television series Agents of S.H.I.E.L.D., Richard Newby from The Hollywood Reporter felt it was time the character received his own film, calling the character "the MCU's most powerful asset yet to be fully untapped". Jackson was attached to reprise his role in Bradstreet's series, with the latter writing and serving as executive producer.

In December 2020, Marvel Studios President Kevin Feige officially announced a new series titled Secret Invasion, with Jackson co-starring with Ben Mendelsohn in his MCU role of Talos. The series is based on the 2008–09 comic book storyline of the same name, with Feige describing it as a "crossover event series" that would tie-in with future MCU films; the series' official premise further described it as a crossover event series. Marvel Studios chose to make a Secret Invasion series instead of a film because it allowed them to do something different than they had done before. Bradstreet had worked on scripts for the series for about a year, before he was replaced with Brian Tucker. Directors were being lined up by April 2021. Thomas Bezucha and Ali Selim were attached to direct the series a month later, with each expected to direct three episodes and work on the story. However, Bezucha left the series during production because of scheduling conflicts with reshoots, and Selim ultimately directed all six episodes. The series reportedly went through multiple issues during pre-production, which necessitated Marvel Studios' executive Jonathan Schwartz becoming more involved with the series to get it "back on track" as it had fallen behind schedule and risked some actors becoming unavailable due to other commitments. The episodes were described as being an hour-long each, with the series ultimately totaling approximately 4.5 hours. Marvel Studios' Feige, Louis D'Esposito, Victoria Alonso, Brad Winderbaum, and Schwartz served as executive producers on the series alongside Jackson, Selim, Bradstreet, and Tucker. The budget for the series was $211.6 million. This was noted for being a large budget compared to the content in the series, which did not use large action set pieces or extensive visual effects. Extensive reshoots were believed to partially be the reason for the large budget.

=== Writing ===
Bradstreet, Tucker, Brant Englestein, Roxanne Paredes, and Michael Bhim served as writers on the series. Tucker received the majority of writing credits on the episodes. Feige said the series would not be looking to match the scope of the Secret Invasion comic book storyline, in terms of the number of characters featured or the impact on the wider universe, considering the comic book featured more characters than the crossover film Avengers: Endgame (2019). Instead, he described Secret Invasion as a showcase for Jackson and Mendelsohn that would explore the political paranoia elements of the Secret Invasion comic series "that was great with the twists and turns that that took". The creatives were also inspired by the Cold War-era espionage novels of John le Carré, the television series Homeland (2011–2020) and The Americans (2013–2018), and the film The Third Man (1949). Selim said the series transitions at times between espionage noir and a Western, highlighting the film The Searchers (1956) as a Western inspiration. Feige said the series would serve as a present-day follow-up to the 1990s story of Captain Marvel (2019), alongside that film's sequel The Marvels (2023), but was tonally different from the films. Jackson said the series would uncover some of the things that happened during the Blip. Cobie Smulders described the series as "a very grounded, on-this-earth drama" that was "dealing with real human issues and dealing with trust".

Discussing the Skrulls, shapeshifting green-skinned extraterrestrials who can perfectly simulate any human being at will, Jackson felt their inclusion introduced "a political aspect" in that their ability to shape-shift makes people question who can be trusted and "What happens when people get afraid and don't understand other people? You can't tell who's innocent and who's guilty in this particular instance." The first episode reveals that Everett K. Ross had been replaced by a Skrull infiltrator, while the fourth episode reveals that James "Rhodey" Rhodes has been replaced by the Skrull Raava. Feige explained that the creators chose Rhodes to be a Skrull because they were looking for an established MCU character viewers would not be expecting to be a Skrull, and to introduce a new experience for viewers rewatching his past MCU appearances and questioning if he was a Skrull during them. They approached actor Don Cheadle during early development of the series about this, who liked the opportunity to be able to "play with different sides of Rhodey that we haven't seen before". It is revealed that Rhodes had been replaced by a Skrull "for a long time" and is seen wearing a hospital gown when being released from his containment pod. This was interpreted by some to mean he had been replaced after the events of Captain America: Civil War (2016), a theory which Selim acknowledged, though he would not confirm this specifically, saying "does it have to be definitive, or is it more fun for the audience to go back and revisit every moment" since Civil War to question whether Rhodes was a Skrull or not.

=== Casting ===
Jackson was expected to reprise his role in the series with the reveal of its development in September 2020. When the series was officially announced that December, Feige confirmed Jackson's casting and announced that Mendelsohn would co-star. Kingsley Ben-Adir was cast as the Skrull Gravik, the "lead villain" role, in March 2021, and the following month, Olivia Colman was cast as Sonya Falsworth, along with Emilia Clarke as Talos's daughter G'iah, and Killian Scott as Gravik's second-in-command Pagon. In May 2021, Christopher McDonald joined the cast as newscaster Chris Stearns, a newly created character rather than one from the comics, who had the potential to appear in other MCU series and films. Carmen Ejogo had joined the cast by November 2021 (although she ultimately did not appear in the series), and the next month, Smulders was set to reprise her MCU role as Maria Hill. In February 2022, set photos revealed that Don Cheadle would appear in his MCU role of James "Rhodey" Rhodes, along with Dermot Mulroney as United States President Ritson. The following month, Jackson confirmed that Martin Freeman and Cheadle would appear in the series, with Freeman reprising his MCU role as Everett K. Ross. In September 2022, it was revealed that Charlayne Woodard was cast in the series as Fury's Skrull wife Priscilla.

Samuel Adewunmi and Katie Finneran were revealed as part of the cast in March 2023, with Adewunmi as the Skrull Beto and Finneran as the scientist Rosa Dalton. Richard Dormer appears as Agent Prescod, while O-T Fagbenle reprises his Black Widow (2021) role as Rick Mason.

=== Design ===
==== Sets and costumes ====
Frank Walsh serves as production designer, while Claire Anderson serves as costume designer. In Secret Invasion, Fury does not wear his signature eyepatch, which Jackson noted was a character choice. He explained, "The patch is part of who the strong Nick Fury was. It's part of his vulnerability now. You can look at it and see he's not this perfectly indestructible person. He doesn't feel like that guy."

==== Title sequence ====
A screenshot from the opening title sequence, in which generative AI was used in part to help create the sequence; the use of AI was criticized.

The opening title sequence was created by Method Studios using generative AI, which prompted significant backlash online. Some commentators felt this was particularly poor timing given the series was released during the 2023 Writers Guild of America strike for which the use of artificial intelligence over real people was a key issue, with language about protecting writers against the use of AI in the writing process. Method Studios issued a statement in response to criticism stating that none of their artists had been replaced with artificial intelligence for the sequence and that the technology, both existing and custom-built for this series, was just one tool that their team used to achieve a specific final look. The statement elaborated that many elements in the sequence were created using traditional tools and techniques, and the artificial intelligence technology was just used to add an "otherworldly and alien look" which the creative team felt "perfectly aligned with the project's overall theme and the desired aesthetic". Storyboard artists and animators on the series expressed disappointment in the opening sequence being generated by AI.

=== Filming ===
Filming had begun by September 1, 2021, in London, under the working title Jambalaya, with Selim directing the series, and Remi Adefarasin serving as cinematographer. Filming was previously expected to begin in mid-August 2021. Jackson began filming his scenes on October 14, after already working on The Marvels which was filming in London at the same time. Filming occurred in West Yorkshire, England, including Leeds on January 22, Huddersfield on January 24, and in Halifax at Piece Hall from January 24 to 31, 2022. Filming occurred at the Liverpool Street station on February 28, 2022. Soundstage work occurred at Pinewood Studios on seven of its stages, as well as Hallmark House, and Versa Studios. Filming wrapped on April 25, 2022. Additional filming occurred in London's Brixton neighborhood, and was also expected to occur across Europe.

In mid-2022, factions of the crew and the series' creative leaders experienced disagreements which "debilitated" the production. Jackson revealed in mid-June 2022 that he would return to London in August to work on reshoots for Secret Invasion, after doing the same for The Marvels. McDonald was returning to London by the end of July for the reshoots, which he said were to make the series "better" and to go "much deeper than before". He also indicated that a new writer was brought on to the production to work on the additional material. Jackson completed his reshoots by August 12, 2022, while Clarke filmed scenes in London at the end of September. By early September, many crew members on the series had been replaced, while co-executive producer Chris Gary, the Marvel Studios Production and Development executive overseeing the series, was reassigned and expected to leave the studio when his contract expired at the end of 2023. Jonathan Schwartz, a senior Marvel Studios executive and a member of the Marvel Studios Parliament group, was dispatched to oversee the production. Bezucha also left the series during this time due to new scheduling conflicts with the reshoots. Jackson said because Selim became the director of all the series' episodes, it provided consistency for the cast and crew with the ideas and concepts and allowed Selim to make the series his way. Eben Bolter served as the cinematographer during additional photography which lasted for four months.

=== Post-production ===
Pete Beaudreau, Melissa Lawson Cheung, Drew Kilcoin, and James Stanger serve as editors, while Georgina Street serves as the visual effects producer and Aharon Bourland as the visual effects supervisor. Visual effects for the series were provided by Digital Domain, FuseFX, Luma Pictures, MARZ, One of Us, Zoic Studios, and Cantina Creative.

=== Music ===
In February 2023, Kris Bowers was revealed to be composing for the series, and was working on the score at that time. The series' main title track, "Nick Fury (Main Title Theme)", was released digitally as a single by Marvel Music and Hollywood Records on June 20.

All music is composed by Kris Bowers.

Secret Invasion: Vol. 1 (Episodes 1–3) [Original Soundtrack]
No.	Title	Length
1.	"Nick Fury (Main Title Theme)"	2:04
2.	"He's One of Them"	3:03
3.	"Stolen Identity"	2:02
4.	"Moscow Madness"	4:41
5.	"Child Survivor"	3:39
6.	"The Promise"	3:20
7.	"They're All Spies"	4:17
8.	"Sonya"	2:28
9.	"A Need for Vengeance"	4:09
10.	"Shootout"	2:35
11.	"I Choose Blood"	5:34
12.	"Blown Cover"	9:25
Total length:		47:00

All music is composed by Kris Bowers.

Secret Invasion: Vol. 2 (Episodes 4–6) [Original Soundtrack]
No.	Title	Length
1.	"Gravik"	1:43
2.	"Ambush"	7:02
3.	"Beloved"	3:00
4.	"Be Your Enemy"	4:47
5.	"Operatives Assembly"	3:49
6.	"Hello Skrulls"	2:46
7.	"Nothing But a Monster"	2:11
8.	"The Harvest"	3:57
9.	"Funeral Pyre"	1:35
10.	"House Ambush"	1:39
11.	"This Is Personal"	4:04
12.	"The Last Stand"	3:22
13.	"Leave Earth Alone"	3:33
14.	"Super Skrulls"	5:21
15.	"Come with Me"	3:17
16.	"Take Off"	2:06
Total length:		54:00

== Marketing ==
The first footage of the series debuted on Disney+ Day on November 12, 2021. More footage was shown in July 2022 at San Diego Comic-Con. Adam B. Vary of Variety said the footage had an "overall vibe... of paranoia and foreboding", believing the series would fit with the larger "anti-heroic thread" building in Phase Five of the MCU. The first trailer for the series debuted at the 2022 D23 Expo in September 2022. Polygon's Austen Goslin felt the trailer was "mostly a recap of the series' plot", while Vanity Fair's Anthony Breznican noted how Fury had both eyes and said he "appears to be done relying on others to help save the world". Tamera Jones from Collider felt the trailer was "action-packed with explosions and intrigue, giving off more of a spy vibe than a fun paranoid mystery".

The second trailer debuted during Sunday Night Baseball on ESPN on April 2, 2023. Edidiong Mboho of Collider felt the trailer "evokes the thrill and excitement" like the first one and provided the "same sense of urgency and paranoia from the Skrull infiltration". Mboho lauded the trailer for featuring the all-star cast of the series "without giving too much away" of its plot. Dais Johnston of Inverse felt that every shot of the trailer provided a "flashy-but-gritty spy-fi story that swaps out the powers and wisecracks of past works for the ingenuity and strategy Nick Fury is known for". Sam Barsanti of The A.V. Club said the trailer featured "more of the physical and psychological toll that life in general has taken on Fury". In early June 2023, a viral marketing website was created for the series that featured a five-minute clip from the first episode and a new trailer for the series. The locked website was initially revealed through cryptic images tweeted on the series' official Twitter account, which included clues to form the password that allowed access to it. At San Diego Comic-Con in July 2023, a Skrull "invasion" occurred, with fans seeing or becoming Skrulls around the convention.

== Release ==
A red carpet premiere event for Secret Invasion was held in Los Angeles at the El Capitan Theater on June 13, 2023. The series debuted on Disney+ on June 21, 2023, consisting of six episodes, and concluding on July 26, 2023. It was previously expected to release within early 2023. It is the first series of Phase Five of the MCU. The first three episodes were made available on Hulu from July 21 to August 17, 2023, to promote the finale of the series.

== Reception ==
=== Viewership ===
According to market research company Parrot Analytics, which looks at consumer engagement in consumer research, streaming, downloads, and on social media, reported that Secret Invasion was the most in-demand new show in the U.S. for the quarter from April 1 to June 30, 2023. It garnered 42.1 times the average series demand in its first 30 days. The series experienced higher initial demand spikes compared to other Marvel series on Disney+. Whip Media, which tracks viewership data for the more than 25 million worldwide users of its TV Time app, calculated that Secret Invasion was the seventh most-watched streaming original television series of 2023. According to the file-sharing news website TorrentFreak, Secret Invasion was the fifth most-watched pirated television series of 2023. Parrot Analytics reported that Secret Invasion was the third most in-demand streaming original of 2023, with 40 times the average demand for shows.

=== Critical response ===
Secret Invasion: Critical reception by episode
Percentage of positive critics' reviews tracked by the website Rotten Tomatoes

The review aggregator website Rotten Tomatoes reported an approval rating of 52%, with an average score of 6.1/10, based on 197 reviews. The site's critic's consensus states: "A well-deserved showcase for Samuel L. Jackson, Secret Invasion steadies itself after a somewhat slow start by taking the MCU in a darker, more mature direction." Metacritic, which uses a weighted average, assigned the series a score of 63 out of 100 based on 24 critics, indicating "generally favorable reviews".

Richard Newby at Empire gave the series 4 out of 5 stars, feeling that it was "a riveting, tense drama that gifts its actors with weighty material and encourages its audience to look beyond the sheen of superheroism." Newby found the series had taken a "sharp turn" from the sense of comfort of previous MCU projects due to the depiction of mature themes, such as terrorism and torture. Eric Deggans of NPR praised the performance of Samuel L. Jackson and called the series an "antidote to superhero fatigue", writing, "By centering on an aging Nick Fury who is struggling to handle a crisis created by his own broken promises, we get a story focused much more on a flawed hero than some kind of super-person juggling computer-generated cars."

Lucy Mangan of The Guardian gave the show a grade of 3 out of 5 stars, stating, "Some moments in Marvel's latest TV series remind you how utterly watchable brilliant actors are – despite this darker, more mature outing needing a tad more thought." Barry Hertz of The Globe and Mail said "The chases are slow, the explosions meh, the entire pace and tempo sluggish... The real folly of Secret Invasion is that it compels the best actors of any Marvel series so far to squirm while delivering soul-deadening expository dialogue."

=== Accolades ===
Accolades received by Secret Invasion
Award	Date of ceremony	Category	Recipient	Result	Ref.
Black Reel TV Awards	August 13, 2024	Outstanding Supporting Performance in a TV Movie or Limited Series	Don Cheadle	Nominated	
Golden Trailer Awards	June 23, 2023	Best Fantasy Adventure for a TV/Streaming Series (Trailer/Teaser/TV Spot)	"Threat"	Nominated	
NAACP Image Awards	March 16, 2024	Outstanding Actor in a Television Movie, Mini-Series or Dramatic Special	Samuel L. Jackson	Nominated	
NAACP Image Awards	March 16, 2024	Outstanding Supporting Actor in a Television Movie, Limited-Series or Dramatic Special	Don Cheadle	Won	
People's Choice Awards	February 18, 2024	Sci-Fi/Fantasy Show of the Year	Secret Invasion	Nominated	
People's Choice Awards	February 18, 2024	Male TV Star of the Year	Samuel L. Jackson	Nominated	
Saturn Awards	February 4, 2024	Best Superhero Television Series	Secret Invasion	Nominated	

TVLine placed Secret Invasion third on their list of the 10 Worst Shows of 2023.

== Documentary special ==
In February 2021, the documentary series Marvel Studios: Assembled was announced. The special on this series, "The Making of Secret Invasion", was released on Disney+ on September 20, 2023.

== Future ==
In September 2022, Feige stated that Secret Invasion would lead into Armor Wars, with Cheadle set to reprise his role as Rhodes. The series was originally believed to tie in with the film The Marvels, in which Jackson reprises his role as Fury, but that film largely ignores the events of Secret Invasion. Matt Webb Mitovich at TVLine speculated that it likely was intended for The Marvels to be set before Secret Invasion, given that film had numerous previous release dates prior to Secret Invasion's premiere, but that assumption "still leaves continuity issues all over the place".
