= The Riots =

2011 play created by Gillian Slovo

- Written by: Gillian Slovo
- Subject: Compiled from spoken evidence; interviews taken from different people directly and indirectly involved in the 2011 England riots
- Genre: verbatim theatre

Premiere
- Date: 22 November 2011
- Place: Tricycle Theatre, Kilburn, London
- Official website

The Riots is a play created by Gillian Slovo from spoken evidence, which explains and evaluates the events that took place during the 2011 England riots. The play is written in the style of verbatim theatre using interviews from politicians, police, rioters and victims involved in the riots. The Riots first opened at the Tricycle Theatre in Kilburn on 22 November 2011, after previewing from 17 November 2011.

== Context ==
On 6 August 2011 rioting broke out in Tottenham, London in reaction to the death of Mark Duggan, who was shot dead by a police officer on 4 August. Over the next four nights the rioting spread, affecting other areas of London and the rest of England. Serious rioting, looting, assault, and damage to property and businesses took place in cities all over England. Less than two weeks after the initial rioting on 6 August, police forces throughout England had made nearly 3,000 arrests. The government refused to hold a full public enquiry into the causes of the rioting. Nicolas Kent, artistic director of The Riots, contacted Gillian Slovo only days after the rioting began and together they created a dramatic response to these terrible events, which they claimed would answer some questions.

== Overview ==
The Riots is staged in two-halves. The first half gives a thorough and vivid image of how the riots unfolded and spread from city to city. This is told through witness accounts from rioters, police officers, onlookers and local residents, in particular Mohamed Hammoudan, whose house was burnt down. The second half reflects on the riots, using interviews from politicians, rioters, police, teachers, community leaders, lawyers and social workers, analysing why the riots occurred, for what reasons and how society and the government can learn from them. Slovo has compiled a plurality of voices, in an unbiased manner, which describes, discusses and questions the causes of the 2011 England Riots.

== Characters ==
- Diane Abbott MP
- HH Judge Robert Atherton
- John Azah
- Camila Batmanghelidjh
- Martin Sylvester Brown
- Dr Barbara Cleaver
- Chief Inspector Graham Dean
- Sergeant Paul Evans
- Iain Duncan Smith MP
- Harry Fletcher
- Judge Andrew Gilbart QC
- Michael Gove MP
- Mohamed Hammoudan
- Simon Hughes MP
- Chelsea Ives
- Owen Jones
- Sadie King
- Superintendent Leroy Logan
- Karyn McCluskey
- John McDonnell MP
- Revs Nims Obunge
- Sir Hugh Orde
- Greg Powell
- Jacob Sakil
- Stafford Scott
- David Swarbrick
- Inspector Winter
- Man 1
- Man 2
- Man 3

== Original cast ==
The original cast consisted of fourteen actors playing 30 characters: Michele Austin, Sarah Ball, Kingsley Ben-Adir, Grant Burgin, Christopher Fox, Rupert Holliday Evans, Clementine Marlowe-Hunt, Okezie Morro, Cyril Nri, Tom Padley, Alan Parnaby, Selva Rasalingam, Steve Toussaint and Tim Woodward.

== Transfer ==
After a sell out show and 4 star reviews from major newspapers including The Guardian and The Daily Telegraph the production of The Riots closed at the Tricycle Theatre on 10 December 2011. The Riots transferred to the Bernie Grant Arts Centre in Tottenham from 4–14 January 2012.
