= List of visual effects companies =

The table below includes a list of visual effects companies. The main studios are located in California, Vancouver, Montreal, London, Paris, Australia, New Zealand, Mumbai, Bangalore, Sydney, Tokyo, Beijing and Shanghai.

== List of companies ==
Company	Location
The Aaron Sims Company	Los Angeles, United States
ActionVFX	Johnson City, United States
Adobe Systems Incorporated	San Jose, United States
Animal Logic	Sydney, AU; Venice, United States and Vancouver, Canada
Atmosphere Visual Effects	Vancouver, Canada
Barnstorm VFX	Vancouver, Canada; Los Angeles, United States
Base FX	Beijing; Wuxi; Xiamen; Kuala Lumpur; Los Angeles, United States
Bird Studios	London, England
Bron Studios	Vancouver, Canada
BUF Compagnie	Paris, France
Cafe FX	Santa Maria, United States
Cantina Creative	Los Angeles, United States
Cinema Research Corporation	Hollywood, United States
Cinesite	London; Hollywood; Montreal, Canada
Crafty Apes	Los Angeles; Atlanta; New York; Albuquerque; Vancouver; Baton Rouge; Montreal
Creature Effects, Inc.	Los Angeles, United States
Digital Domain	Playa Vista, United States; Vancouver, Canada
Digital Frontier FX	Marina Del Rey, United States
DNEG	London, England; Vancouver, Montreal, Toronto, Canada; Bangalore, Chandigarh, Chennai, Mumbai, India
DreamWorks Pictures	Los Angeles, United States
The Embassy Visual Effects	Vancouver, Canada; Los Angeles, United States
Eastape Films	Mohali, India
Escape Studios	London, England
Flash Film Works	Los Angeles, United States
Framestore	London, England; Los Angeles, Chicago, New York, United States; Montreal, Canada; Melbourne, Australia; Mumbai, India
FuseFX	New York and Los Angeles, United States; Vancouver, Canada; Adelaide, Australia (as Rising Sun Pictures)
Hydraulx	Santa Monica, United States
Image Engine	Vancouver, Canada
Industrial Light & Magic	San Francisco; Singapore; Vancouver; London; Sydney
Intelligent Creatures	Toronto, Canada
Jim Henson's Creature Shop	Los Angeles; Hollywood; Camden Town, London
Legacy Effects	Los Angeles, United States
Lola Visual Effects	Los Angeles, United States
Look Effects	Culver City, United States
Luma Pictures	Melbourne, Australia; Los Angeles, United States; Vancouver, Canada
M5 Industries	San Francisco, United States
Mac Guff	Los Angeles; Paris
Manex Visual Effects	Alameda, United States
Main Road Post	Moscow, Russia
Makuta VFX	Universal City, United States; Hyderabad, India
MAS effects	New York, Los Angeles, United States
Matte World Digital	Novato, United States
Method Studios	Atlanta, Los Angeles, New York, United States; Montreal, Vancouver, Canada; Melbourne, Australia; Pune, India
Mikros Image	Paris, Montreal, Bruxelles, Liège
The Mill" | The Mill	London, England; New York, Chicago, Los Angeles, United States; Berlin, Germany; Bangalore, India
Modus FX	Montreal, Canada
Moving Picture Company	Soho, London, England
Netter Digital	North Hollywood, United States
NOISE VFX	Los Angeles, CA, United States
The Orphanage	California, United States
Pixomondo	Frankfurt; Stuttgart; Los Angeles; Toronto; Montreal; Vancouver
QPPE	
Rainmaker Digital Effects	Vancouver, Canada
Red Chillies Entertainment	Mumbai, India
Rise FX	Berlin, Germany
Rising Sun Pictures	Adelaide, Australia
Robot Communications	Tokyo, Japan
Rodeo FX	Montreal, Quebec, Munich, Los Angeles
SupernovaFX Studios	Pune, India
SAGA VFX	Barcelona, Spain
Scanline VFX	Munich; Los Angeles; Vancouver; Stuttgart; London; Montreal; Seoul
Scarecrow VFX	Los Angeles, United States
Snowmasters	Lexington, United States
Sony Pictures Imageworks	Culver City, United States; Vancouver, Canada
Strictly FX	
Surreal World	Melbourne, Australia
The Third Floor, Inc.	London
Tau Films	United States, Malaysia, India, China, Canada
Territory Studio	London, United States
Tippett Studio	Berkeley, United States
Trixter	Berlin and Munich, Germany
Tsuburaya Productions	Tokyo, Japan
VisionArt	Santa Monica, United States
Vision Crew Unlimited	
Wētā FX	Wellington, New Zealand
ZERO VFX	Boston, United States
Zoic Studios	California, New York, New Jersey, United States; Vancouver, Canada
ZFX Inc	
