= Rising Sun Pictures =

Australian visual effects company

- Type: Subsidiary
- Industry: Visual effects
- Founded: 1995
- Founder: Tony Clark; Gail Fuller; Wayne Lewis
- Headquarters: Flinders Street, Adelaide, Australia
- Key people: Alexandra Daunt Watney (Company President)
- Parent: Pitch Black Company
- Website: www.rsp.com.au

Rising Sun Pictures (RSP) is an Australian visual effects and computer animation company headquartered in Adelaide, South Australia, led by Alexandra Daunt Watney. Since September 2023, it has been owned by Pitch Black Company. Its film and television credits include Furiosa: A Mad Max Saga, Deadpool & Wolverine, Charlotte's Web, Sonic the Hedgehog 3 and Knuckles.

== History ==
The company was founded in 1995 by Tony Clark, Wayne Lewis, and Gail Fuller in Adelaide. It is named after the Rising Sun Inn in the Adelaide suburb of Kensington, where they held their first meeting.

In 2015, RSP formed a partnership with the University of South Australia whereby nine Bachelor of Media Arts students would work at RSP as part of their degree. This collaboration continues as of 2022, with graduates in high demand and several subsequently employed at RSP.

In 2016, the company launched a production office in Sydney, located at Fox Studios Australia. This is intended to support both local Australian filmmakers (many of whom are based nearby and use Fox for shooting, editorial and other production and post-production work) as well as its ongoing work with international clients. Having a base in Sydney would allow RSP to become involved at an earlier stage of production. This office has since been closed down.

During the COVID-19 pandemic, Australia's relative insulation from the worst effects allowed film and television production to continue in near-normal conditions, including the production of Mortal Kombat in Adelaide.

In March 2021 RSP expanded its offices and studios. In mid-2021, it opened a small production studio in Southbank precinct of Brisbane, Queensland.

In April 2021, Los Angeles-based FuseFX acquired Rising Sun Pictures. No operational changes were planned at the company, which would continue to maintain its brand, but the acquisition would allow it to expand further.

Rising Sun has worked with the Australian Institute for Machine Learning, enabling it to develop some cutting-edge new tools.

In January 2023, the Pitch Black Company was founded to encompass all of the brands owned by the now defunct Fuse Group. This includes Folks VFX, FuseFX, Rising Sun Pictures and El Ranchito VFX.

== Description and people ==
RSP head office is located on Flinders Street, Adelaide.

As of September 2025, Alexandra Daunt Watney serves as president of the studio, Phil Barrenger as head of operations, and Ian Cope as executive producer.

== Awards ==
The company has won many awards over the years.

It won the Best Video award at the 2003 edition of the ARIA Music Awards, for their work on Rogue Traders' "One of My Kind".

The company won AEAF Special Merit Awards for Mortal Kombat and the second season of The Boys in 2021.

In 2022, RSP won two AEAF Bronze Awards, for Jungle Cruise and Cowboy Bebop. In the same year, VFX supervisor Julian Hutchens was co-winner of the AACTA Award for Best Visual Effects or Animation for the team's work on Baz Luhrmann’s Elvis.

In 2026, VFX supervisor Guido Wolter and his team are nominated for Best Visual Effects at the 98th Academy Awards for his work on Sinners.

== Film and TV credits ==
- A Complete Unknown (2024)
- Ahsoka (2023)
- Alita: Battle Angel (2019)
- Andor (Season 1) (2022)
- Animal World (2018)
- Ant-Man and the Wasp: Quantumania (2023)
- Apex (2026)
- Avengers: Doomsday (2026)
- Balls Up (2026)
- Black Widow (2021)
- Candyman (2021)
- Captain Marvel (2019)
- Cocaine Bear (2023)
- Cowboy Bebop (2021)
- Deadpool & Wolverine (2024)
- Dumbo (2019)
- Elvis (2022)
- Ford v Ferrari (2019)
- Furiosa: A Mad Max Saga (2024)
- Game of Thrones (2011–2019)
- Gravity (2013)
- Happy Gilmore 2 (2025)
- Harold and the Purple Crayon (2024)
- Harry Potter and the Half-Blood Prince (2009)
- Hawkeye (2021)
- Indiana Jones and the Dial of Destiny (2023)
- Jungle Cruise (2021)
- Knuckles (2024)
- Loki (Season 2) (2023)
- Logan (2017)
- Michael (2026)
- Mickey 17 (2025)
- Monarch: Legacy of Monsters (2023-present)
- Mortal Kombat (2021)
- Mortal Kombat II (2026)
- One Piece (2023-present)
- Peter Rabbit (2018)
- Play Dirty (2025)
- See (Season 3) (2022)
- Shang-Chi and the Legend of the Ten Rings (2021)
- Sinners (2025)
- Sonic the Hedgehog 3 (2024)
- Spider-Man: Far From Home (2019)
- Superman Returns (2006)
- The Acolyte (2024)
- The Bluff (2026)
- The Boys (Season 2) (2020)
- The Boys (Season 3) (2022)
- The Fall Guy (2024)
- The Hunger Games (2012)
- The Hunger Games: Sunrise on the Reaping (2026)
- The Lord of the Rings: The Return of the King (2003)
- The Lord of the Rings: The Rings of Power (2022)
- The Marvels (2023)
- The Predator (2018)
- The Roses (2025)
- The Wolverine (2013)
- Thor: Love and Thunder (2022)
- Thor: Ragnarok (2017)
- Thunderbolts* (2025)
- Tomb Raider (2018)
- War Machine (2026)
- Wicked: For Good (2025)
- X-Men: Dark Phoenix (2019)
- X-Men: Days of Future Past (2014)

== Open source projects ==
Open source projects sponsored by Rising Sun Pictures include:

- Earth - a utility for finding files across a large network of machines and track disk usage in real time
- pyshake - integrates the Python programming language into the compositing package Shake to enable running of Python code from within Shake and exposing the Shake API to Python
- Affogato - a plugin for Avid's Softimage XSI 3D animation software which links XSI with high-end 3D RenderMan-compliant renderers
- Sun Grid Engine - implemented support for Array Job Interdependencies

== See also ==
- Cospective, software company that started as Rising Sun Research
- List of film production companies
- List of television production companies
