= Remi Adefarasin =

English cinematographer

Remi Adefarasin OBE BSC
- Born: 2 February 1948 (age 78); London, England
- Years active: 1968–2025
- Spouse: Jaya Adefarasin

Remi Adefarasin (born 2 February 1948) is an English cinematographer.

For his work on Elizabeth (1998), he became the first black person to be nominated for the Academy Award for Best Cinematography.

== Career ==
He studied photography and filmmaking at Harrow Technical College, and then started his career as a camera trainee at BBC-TV's Ealing Studios.

Adefarasin was appointed Officer of the Order of the British Empire (OBE) in the 2012 New Year Honours for services to television and film.

On 7th February 2026 he was given the BSC Lifetime Achievement Award. He is the 19th member to receive this highest honour bestowed by the society.

== Personal life ==
Adefarasin is married and has three sons.

== Filmography ==
=== Film ===
Year	Title	Director
1990	Truly, Madly, Deeply	Anthony Minghella
1992	The Hummingbird Tree	Noella Smith
1994	Great Moments in Aviation	Beeban Kidron
1994	Captives	Angela Pope
1996	Hollow Reed	Angela Pope
1998	Sliding Doors	Peter Howitt
1998	Elizabeth	Shekhar Kapur
1999	Onegin	Martha Fiennes
2000	The House of Mirth	Terence Davies
2002	About a Boy	Paul Weitz; Chris Weitz
2002	Unconditional Love	P. J. Hogan
2002	The One and Only	Simon Cellan Jones
2003	Johnny English	Peter Howitt
2003	The Haunted Mansion	Rob Minkoff
2004	In Good Company	Paul Weitz
2005	Match Point	Woody Allen
2006	Scoop	Woody Allen
2006	Amazing Grace	Michael Apted
2007	Elizabeth: The Golden Age	Shekhar Kapur
2007	Fred Claus	David Dobkin
2010	Cemetery Junction	Ricky Gervais; Stephen Merchant
2010	Little Fockers	Paul Weitz
2012	The Cold Light of Day	Mabrouk El Mechri
2015	Molly Moon and the Incredible Book of Hypnotism	Christopher N. Rowley
2016	Pride and Prejudice and Zombies	Burr Steers
2016	Me Before You	Thea Sharrock
2016	David Brent: Life on the Road	Ricky Gervais
2018	Juliet, Naked	Jesse Peretz
2018	Where Hands Touch	Amma Asante
2019	Fighting with My Family	Stephen Merchant
2019	The Last Vermeer	Dan Friedkin
2020	Jingle Jangle: A Christmas Journey	David E. Talbert
2021	Locked Down	Doug Liman
2022	What's Love Got to Do with It?	Shekhar Kapur
2023	Locked In	Nour Wazzi
2025	My Oxford Year	Iain Morris

=== Television ===
Miniseries

Year	Title	Director	Notes
1984	All the World's a Stage	Michael Elliott; Bob Lockyer; William Slater	Episode "Prologue: Makers of Magic"
1986	The December Rose	Renny Rye	
1988	Christabel	Adrian Shergold	
1989	Summer's Lease	Martyn Friend	
1991	Sleeper	Geoffrey Sax	
1992	Goodbye Cruel World	Adrian Shergold	
1992	Black and White in Color	Isaac Julien	
1995	The Buccaneers	Philip Saville	
1996	Into the Fire	Jane Howell	
1996	Cold Lazarus	Renny Rye	With Ashley Rowe
2000	Arabian Nights	Steve Barron	
2001	Band of Brothers	Richard Loncraine; Tom Hanks; David Leland; Tony To; David Frankel	5 episodes
2010	The Pacific	Tim Van Patten; David Nutter; Carl Franklin; Tony To	5 episodes
2023	Secret Invasion	Ali Selim	

== Awards and nominations ==
Year	Award	Category	Title	Result
1998	Academy Awards	Best Cinematography	Elizabeth	Nominated
1998	BAFTA Awards	Best Cinematography	Elizabeth	Won
1998	American Society of Cinematographers	Outstanding Achievement in Cinematography	Elizabeth	Nominated
1998	Chicago Film Critics Association	Best Cinematography	Elizabeth	Nominated
2001	Primetime Emmy Awards	Outstanding Cinematography for a Limited Series	Band of Brothers (For episode "The Patrol")	Nominated
2010	Primetime Emmy Awards	Outstanding Cinematography for a Limited Series	The Pacific (For episode "Part 5")	Nominated

== See also ==
- List of Academy Award winners and nominees from Great Britain
- List of black Academy Award winners and nominees
