= James Rhodes (Marvel Cinematic Universe) =

Character in the Marvel Cinematic Universe

- Marvel Cinematic Universe character
- Terrence Howard (left) and Don Cheadle (right) as James Rhodes in Iron Man and Iron Man 2 (2010), respectively.
- First appearance: Iron Man (2008)
- Based on: War Machine by: David Michelinie; John Byrne; Bob Layton
- Adapted by: Mark Fergus Hawk Ostby; Art Marcum Matt Holloway
- Portrayed by: Don Cheadle (2010–present); Terrence Howard (2008; Iron Man)
- Voiced by: Don Cheadle (What If...?)

In-universe information
- Full name: James Rupert Rhodes
- Aliases: War Machine; Iron Patriot
- Nickname: Rhodey
- Title: Lieutenant Colonel (U.S. Air Force) Colonel (U.S. Air Force)
- Occupation: Avenger; Pilot; Weapons liaison
- Affiliation: Avengers; Stark Industries; United States Air Force
- Weapon: War Machine armor
- Nationality: American

James Rupert "Rhodey" Rhodes is a superhero character originally portrayed by Terrence Howard and subsequently by Don Cheadle in the Marvel Cinematic Universe (MCU) media franchise, based on the Marvel Comics character of the same name. He is initially depicted as a U.S. Air Force officer who is the best friend of Tony Stark. A skilled pilot and tactician, he becomes involved in Stark's heroic efforts, gaining his suit of Iron Man armor in the process while taking on the alias War Machine, and later the Iron Patriot.

Rhodes is recruited into the Avengers, joining them during the battle against Ultron. When the Avengers face internal conflict over the Sokovia Accords, Rhodes sides with Stark. In the ensuing struggle, he is accidentally injured by Vision and temporarily paralyzed from the waist down. When Thanos invades, Rhodes joins his former team to defend Earth and ultimately survives the Blip. Rhodes continues to serve as an Avenger, participating in the time travel mission to undo Thanos's actions. With trillions of lives successfully restored, Rhodes participates in the final and victorious battle against Thanos; a conflict that costs Stark his life. At some point, a shape-shifting Skrull called Raava hijacks Rhodes' likeness and holds him prisoner. Raava uses Rhodes to gain influence with the president of the United States until Nick Fury kills her and Rhodes is then freed.

Rhodes is a central MCU character, having appeared in seven films as of 2024. He also appears in the miniseries The Falcon and the Winter Soldier (2021) and Secret Invasion (2023), and is expected to headline the planned film Armor Wars.

An alternate version of Rhodes appears in the animated series What If...? (2021), with Cheadle reprising the role. Cheadle also portrays the Skrull Raava impersonating Rhodes in Secret Invasion.

== Superhero character biography ==
James Rhodes served as a pilot and officer in the United States Air Force, flying 138 combat missions before becoming a liaison between the military's Department of Acquisitions and Stark Industries, where he became close friends with Tony Stark.

=== Iron Man and War Machine ===
In 2010, when Stark is kidnapped by the Ten Rings, Rhodes personally leads the mission to rescue him. When the then-unidentified Iron Man armor encounters U.S. military aircraft, Rhodes deduces that it is Stark, and described the resulting damage to the media as the result of a training exercise. After Stark reveals his identity as Iron Man, Rhodes faces pressure from the United States Congress and the military to take possession of the armor. In 2010, as Stark descends into reckless behavior, Rhodes feels he had no choice but to take the armor. After a physical confrontation with Stark, Rhodes takes possession of an Iron Man suit and relinquishes it to the military. Justin Hammer modifies it with new weapons to rebrand Rhodes as War Machine. Rhodes then helps Stark fend off an attack from Ivan Vanko and an army of drones.

In 2012, Rhodes is rebranded as the Iron Patriot. He works directly for the President of the United States and is tasked with tracking down a terrorist called the Mandarin. Rhodes discovers that the Mandarin is a ruse created by Aldrich Killian by hiring actor Trevor Slattery to portray the role. Killian captures Rhodes and steals the Iron Patriot armor, using it to kidnap the president. Rhodes escapes, aiding Stark in fighting Killian's army of Extremis soldiers, and rescues the president.

=== Joining the Avengers ===
In 2015, Rhodes attends the Avengers' party at Avengers Tower. Later, he is brought by Nick Fury and Maria Hill to assist in their fight against Ultron in Sokovia. Afterwards, he is recruited to become a new member of the Avengers, alongside Wanda Maximoff, Vision, and Sam Wilson at the new Avengers Compound led by Steve Rogers and Natasha Romanoff.

In 2016, Rhodes is present at the Avengers Compound when U.S. Secretary of State Thaddeus Ross arrives and talks to the team about the Sokovia Accords. Rhodes agrees with Stark regarding the United Nations overseeing the team and signs the Accords. In Bucharest, he assists in the apprehension of Rogers, Wilson, Bucky Barnes, and T'Challa. Later, he joins Stark, Romanoff, Peter Parker, T'Challa, and Vision to intercept Rogers, Barnes, Wilson, Clint Barton, Scott Lang, and Maximoff at Leipzig/Halle airport in Germany, where a fight ensues. After Rogers and Barnes escape on a Quinjet, Rhodes is accidentally hit by Vision whose blast incapacitates his suit, causing him to fall. Stark and Wilson are unable to catch him and he lands on the ground, fracturing his spinal column and leaving him paralyzed from the waist down. He is taken to the Columbia University medical center. Afterwards, he is brought to the Compound and is able to move slowly after Stark designed bionic supports for his legs as he underwent physical therapy.

In 2018, Rhodes is met by Bruce Banner at the Compound. Having become disillusioned with the Accords, Rhodes disobeys orders from Ross to arrest Rogers, Romanoff, Wilson, and Maximoff after they return with Vision to the Compound. He then joins them in the Quinjet to Wakanda, where he helps fight in the battle against the Outriders. He witnesses Thor, Rocket Raccoon, and Groot's arrival. Rhodes regroups with the team in the forest near Vision where he witnesses Thanos arrive and tries to fight him, but is incapacitated by Thanos' use of the Infinity Gauntlet. Rhodes survives the Blip and is left confused of what happened.

Shortly after returning to the Compound, Rhodes reports to Rogers and Romanoff that Fury's pager stopped transmitting a signal. They are then met by Carol Danvers. (Note: As depicted in the mid-credit scene of Captain Marvel (2019))

=== Time Heist and aftermath ===
Twenty-three days later, Rhodes witnesses Danvers return with Stark and Nebula. The next day, Rhodes joins Rogers, Romanoff, Banner, Thor, Rocket, Danvers, and Nebula on the spaceship, the Benatar, to travel to the Garden, where they confront Thanos. They learn that he destroyed the Infinity Stones, and Rhodes witnesses Thor kill Thanos.

In 2023, Rhodes continues missions as an Avenger, keeping track of Barton's whereabouts and reporting back to Romanoff. After Stark and Lang devise a plan to time travel via the Quantum Realm, Rhodes returns to the Avengers Compound and goes with Nebula, Romanoff, and Barton to an alternate 2014 timeline. They go to the planet Morag, say goodbye to Barton and Romanoff, and watch as an alternate version of Peter Quill arrives. Rhodes knocks him out and they retrieve the Power Stone. After Banner reverses the Blip, the Compound gets bombed and Rhodes, Rocket, and Banner get trapped under rubble. Lang rescues them and Rhodes, now in a new armor, is able to participate in the battle against an alternate Thanos and his army. After Stark sacrifices himself to win the battle, Rhodes is at Stark's side during his final moments, and a week later, attends Stark's funeral.

In 2024, Rhodes attends a ceremony at the Smithsonian Institution where Wilson donates Rogers' shield to the museum, and the two catch up in the Captain America exhibit.

=== Replaced by a Skrull ===
By 2026, Rhodes is kidnapped by the Skrull general Gravik, who has him replaced with one of his agents, Raava. Rhodes is rescued by G'iah, who helps him, along with Everett Ross and others, from fracking pods within New Skrullos in Russia.

== Alternate versions ==
An alternate version of Rhodes appears in the animated series What If...?, with Cheadle reprising his role.

=== Killmonger deception ===
In an alternate 2009, Rhodes is sent to purchase vibranium from Stark's contact, Ulysses Klaue, for an army of combat drones that Stark and Erik "Killmonger" Stevens are designing. T'Challa ambushes the transaction, having been tipped off by Klaue at Killmonger's behest, but is killed by the latter. Killmonger then kills Rhodes as well, and frames both him and T'Challa for killing each other in order to spark conflict between the United States and Wakanda.

== Character creation, characterization, and appearances ==
The character of James "Rhodey" Rhodes first appeared in Iron Man #118, in January 1979. In Iron Man #170, in May 1983, Rhodes became Iron Man for a time. Other variations of the character debuted later, with an up-armored Rhodes becoming known as War Machine in Iron Man #282, in July 1992, and as Iron Patriot in Gambit #13, in May 2013. In the mid-2000s, with many movies having been made from other Marvel properties licensed to other studios, Kevin Feige realized that Marvel still owned the rights to the core members of the Avengers, which included those from Iron Man's supporting characters. Feige, a self-professed "fanboy", envisioned creating a shared universe just as creators Stan Lee and Jack Kirby had done with their comic books in the early 1960s.

=== Casting ===
Terrence Howard was contracted to play Rhodes in the 2008 film Iron Man. Howard was signed on before any of the other major actors and was the highest-paid actor in the film. Favreau cast Howard because he felt he could play War Machine in a sequel. Howard prepared for the role by visiting Nellis Air Force Base on March 16, 2007, where he ate with the pilots and observed HH-60 Pave Hawk rescue helicopters and F-22 Raptors.

Howard and his father are Iron Man fans, partly because Rhodes was one of the few black superheroes when he was a child. He was a Downey fan since he saw him in Weird Science, and the two competed physically on set.

Entertainment Weekly reported that Howard was offered a 50 to 80 percent pay cut for Iron Man 2, though it said that it was unclear whether Howard turned down the role or whether Marvel withdrew their offer. Following the contract dispute between Howard and Marvel Studios, Don Cheadle was cast to portray War Machine, and Cheadle has portrayed the character for the rest of his MCU appearances. Isaac Perlmutter, who had previously overseen the development of Marvel Studios, was alleged to have been removed from that position in part due to replacing Howard with Cheadle on the grounds that black people "look the same". A person with knowledge of his creative approach said, however, that Perlmutter "neither discriminates nor cares about diversity, he just cares about what he thinks will make money".

Cheadle only had a few hours to accept the role and did not even know what storyline Rhodes would undergo. He commented that he is a comic book fan, but had not previously participated in comics-themed films due to the scarcity of black superheroes. Cheadle said he thought Iron Man was a robot before the first film came out.

=== Characterization ===
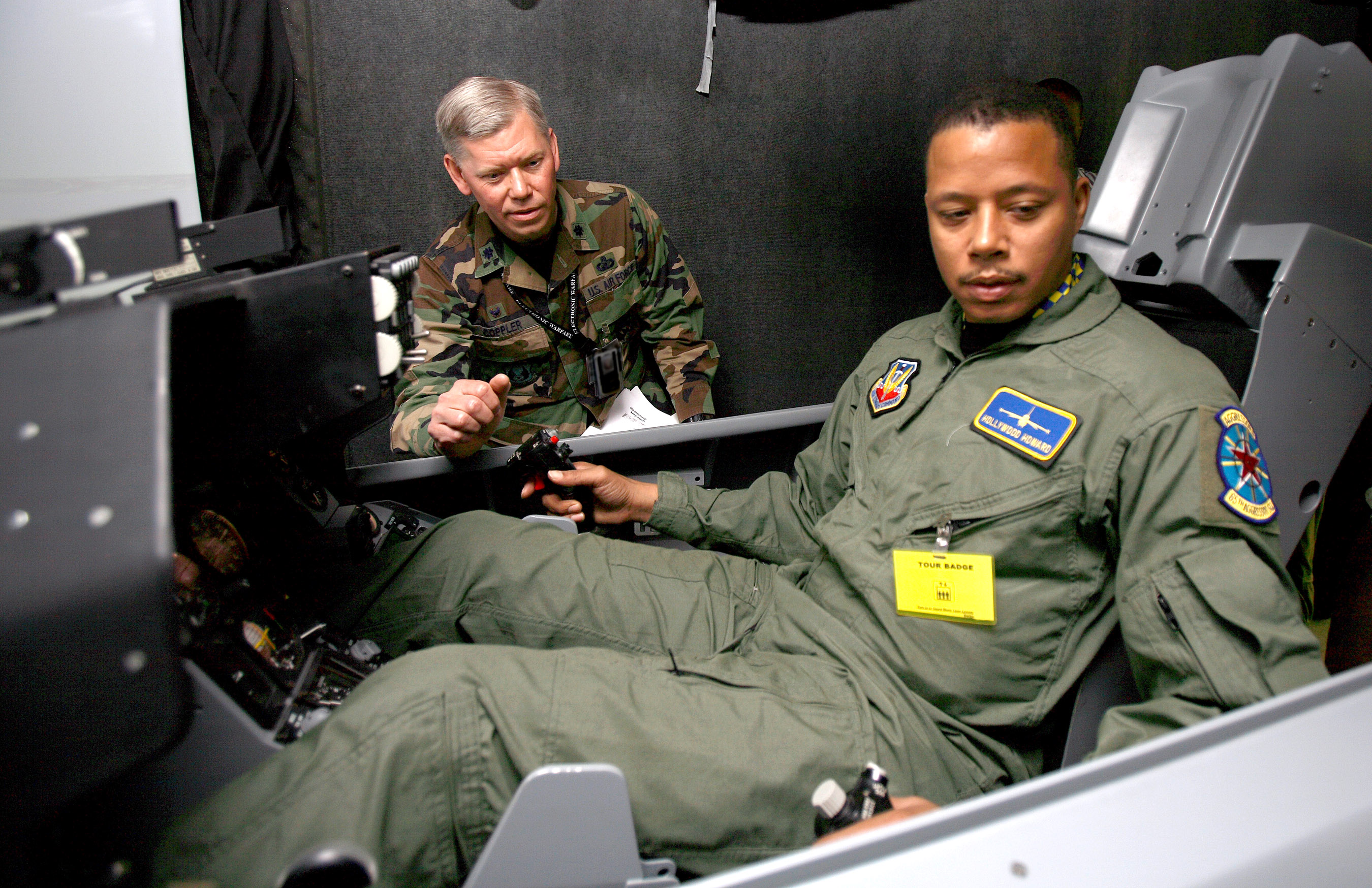
Howard studying aircraft controls for his role in Iron Man.

A friend of Stark's and the liaison between Stark Industries and the United States Air Force in the department of acquisitions, specifically weapons development. He holds the rank of lieutenant colonel in the United States Air Force and acts as the military's chief liaison to Stark Industries' weapons division, and is initially oblivious to Obadiah Stane's actions. While Rhodes is roguish in the comics after he met Stark, his earlier disciplinarian character forms a dynamic with Stark, and he is unsure whether or not Stark's actions are acceptable. "Rhodey is completely disgusted with the way Tony has lived his life, but at a certain point he realizes that perhaps there is a different way", Howard said. "Whose life is the right way; is it the strict military life, or the life of an independent?"

The War Machine armor, as depicted in Phase One of the Marvel Cinematic Universe (MCU).

On how he approached his character in Iron Man 2, Cheadle stated "I go, what's the common denominator here? And the common denominator was really his friendship with Tony, and that's what we really tried to track in this one. How is their friendship impacted once Tony comes out and owns 'I am Iron Man'?". Cheadle said his suit was 23 kilograms (50 lb) of metal, and that he could not touch his face while wearing it.

In Iron Man 3, Rhodes operates the redesigned/upgraded War Machine armor, taking on an American flag-inspired color scheme similar to the Iron Patriot armor from the comics. Feige said of Rhodes and the armor, "The notion in the movie is that a red, white and blue suit is a bold statement, and it's meant to be. With Rhodey, he's very much the foil to Tony's eccentricities, and in this one you get to see this and be reminded of the trust and friendship between them in that great Shane Black buddy-cop fashion." In the film, the president asks Rhodey to take up the moniker "Iron Patriot," and don the red, white, and blue suit, in order to be the government's "American hero" in response to the events in The Avengers.

Cheadle called Rhodes' appearance in Captain America: Civil War a "bit more intense and pivotal" compared to his previous appearances. Following his paralysis during the events of Civil War, Rhodes is given an apparatus by Stark to walk again, although according to Cheadle, in Avengers: Infinity War, Rhodes is reluctant to don his War Machine armor and rejoin the Avengers due to his injury. Cheadle believed that Rhodes is "negotiating this reunion and his rejoining this team". He also explained that Rhodes's relationship with Stark "deepened" from his accident, saying, "I think Tony feels somewhat responsible and culpable in a way. But again, he's always had my back in a way that only he could really have".

In Avengers: Endgame, Cheadle described Rhodes's newfound belonging as an Avenger as "not so much straddling one foot in the military. He's much more on the side of The Avengers than he was prior." This is reflected on Rhodes's more instinctive and realist worldview in the midst of encountering the fantastic, with Cheadle explaining, "He's definitely got some 'what-the-eff-is-happening' [attitude,] more than maybe the rest of them do, given his background. But it's a trial by fire, and he's quickly adapted to what [the threat] is, rather than what he wishes it were."

=== Appearances ===
Early screenplay drafts written by Alfred Gough, Miles Millar, and David Hayter for New Line Cinema, pitted Iron Man against his father Howard Stark, who becomes War Machine instead of Rhodes. Artist Phil Saunders had created concept art for an unused "hall of armor" scene in the film which included the War Machine armor.

- James Rhodes is introduced in Iron Man, and is portrayed by Terrence Howard.
- In Iron Man 2, Rhodes is under pressure from the United States government to convince Tony Stark to relinquish ownership of the Iron Man armor. When Stark drunkenly endangers civilian lives, Rhodes is forced to don an Iron Man suit to intervene during the confrontation, to which Stark says: "You wanna be the War Machine, take your shot." Rhodes's borrowed armor is subsequently retrofitted by Justin Hammer with various weapon enhancements at an Air Force base, but the 'ex-wife' missile proves to be woefully below standards, and the War Machine armor itself is briefly taken over by remote control and used to attack Stark before Pepper Potts and Natasha Romanoff break the connection controlling him. Once freed, Rhodes fights alongside Stark to defeat Ivan Vanko.
- In Iron Man 3, Rhodes is promoted to full colonel and his armor is painted red, white, and blue. According to director Shane Black, the patriotic color scheme and name was chosen by the U.S. government in response to the events of The Avengers. Rhodes states that the U.S. government deemed "War Machine" to be too militaristic and that "Iron Patriot" tested well with focus groups. The armor is briefly stolen and used by Eric Savin to abduct President Ellis, but Rhodes is able to recover the armor at the film's conclusion and save the President.
- In Avengers: Age of Ultron, Rhodes operates the black and silver War Machine armor, aiding the Avengers in the final battle against Ultron, and joins the team with Vision, Sam Wilson, and Wanda Maximoff.
- In Captain America: Civil War, Rhodes sides with Stark when the Avengers are presented with the Sokovia Accords for the government to regulate their actions. This puts him at odds with Steve Rogers's team of Scott Lang, Clint Barton, Bucky Barnes, Maximoff, and Wilson. Stark's team of Rhodes, Romanoff, Peter Parker, Vision, and T'Challa confront Rogers' team in Germany. However, Rhodes gets injured by Vision by accident and is paralyzed in his legs.
- In Avengers: Infinity War, Rhodes stands against Ross and the Sokovia Accords and goes with Rogers and the others to defend Vision in Wakanda. After Thanos completes the Infinity Gauntlet, Rhodes is one of the few survivors.
- Rhodes appears in the mid-credits scene in Captain Marvel, along with Rogers, Romanoff, and Bruce Banner where they meet Carol Danvers.
- In Avengers: Endgame, Rhodes reunites with Stark and travels to space with the team to Thanos' garden planet to find out that he destroyed the Stones. In 2023, he travels via the Quantum Realm with Nebula to Morag in an alternate timeline to get the Power Stone. After the Blip is reversed, an alternate version of Thanos arrives and attacks the Avengers Headquarters, causing Rhodes, Rocket, and Banner to be trapped, but they are rescued by Lang and then he joins the final fight against Thanos. Afterwards, Rhodes attends Stark's funeral.
- In The Falcon and the Winter Soldier, Rhodes attends a ceremony in Washington D.C., in which Wilson gives Rogers' shield to the U.S. government and talks with Wilson afterwards.
- In Secret Invasion, Rhodes is rescued from fracking pods within New Skrullos.
- An alternate timeline version of Rhodes appears in the Disney+ animated series What If...?.
- Cheadle is expected to return as Rhodes to headline the planned film Armor Wars.

== Reception ==
Jacob Stalworthy of The Independent was negative of the character, opining that the character was "Iron Man without backstory or humour". However, Jeremy Schneider of NJ.com was more positive of the character and Cheadle's portrayal while highlighting the character being paralyzed in Captain America: Civil War as "one of the most poignant moments in the entire MCU".

=== Accolades ===
Year	Award	Category	Work	Actor	Result	Ref.
2008	Scream Awards	Best Supporting Actor	Iron Man	Terrence Howard	Nominated	
2008	Black Reel Awards	Best Supporting Actor	Iron Man	Terrence Howard	Nominated	
2010	Teen Choice Awards	Choice Movie: Fight (Iron Man & War Machine vs The Hammer Drones)	Iron Man 2	Don Cheadle	Won (Note: Shared with Robert Downey Jr.)	
2010	Scream Awards	Best Supporting Actor	Iron Man 2	Don Cheadle	Won	
2011	People's Choice Awards	Favorite On-Screen Team	Iron Man 2	Don Cheadle	Nominated	
2011	BET Awards	Best Actor	Iron Man 2	Don Cheadle	Won	
2013	Teen Choice Awards	Choice Movie: Chemistry	Iron Man 3	Don Cheadle	Won	
2016	Teen Choice Awards	Choice Movie: Chemistry	Captain America: Civil War	Don Cheadle	Nominated (Note: Shared with Robert Downey Jr., Scarlett Johansson, Paul Bettany, and Chadwick Boseman)	
2016	Kids' Choice Awards	#SQUAD	Captain America: Civil War	Don Cheadle	Won (Note: Shared with Chris Evans, Robert Downey Jr., Scarlett Johansson, Sebastian Stan, Anthony Mackie, Jeremy Renner, and Chadwick Boseman)	
2019	National Film & TV Awards	Best Performance in a Movie	Avengers: Endgame	Don Cheadle	Won	
2021	Primetime Creative Arts Emmy Awards	Primetime Emmy Award for Outstanding Guest Actor in a Drama Series	The Falcon and the Winter Soldier	Don Cheadle	Nominated	
2024	NAACP Image Awards	Outstanding Supporting Actor in a Television Movie, Limited-Series or Dramatic Special	Secret Invasion	Don Cheadle	Won	
2024	Black Reel TV Awards	Outstanding Supporting Performance in a TV Movie or Limited Series	Secret Invasion	Don Cheadle	Nominated	

== See also ==
- War Machine
- War Machine in other media
