= Kyle Bradstreet =

American television writer and producer

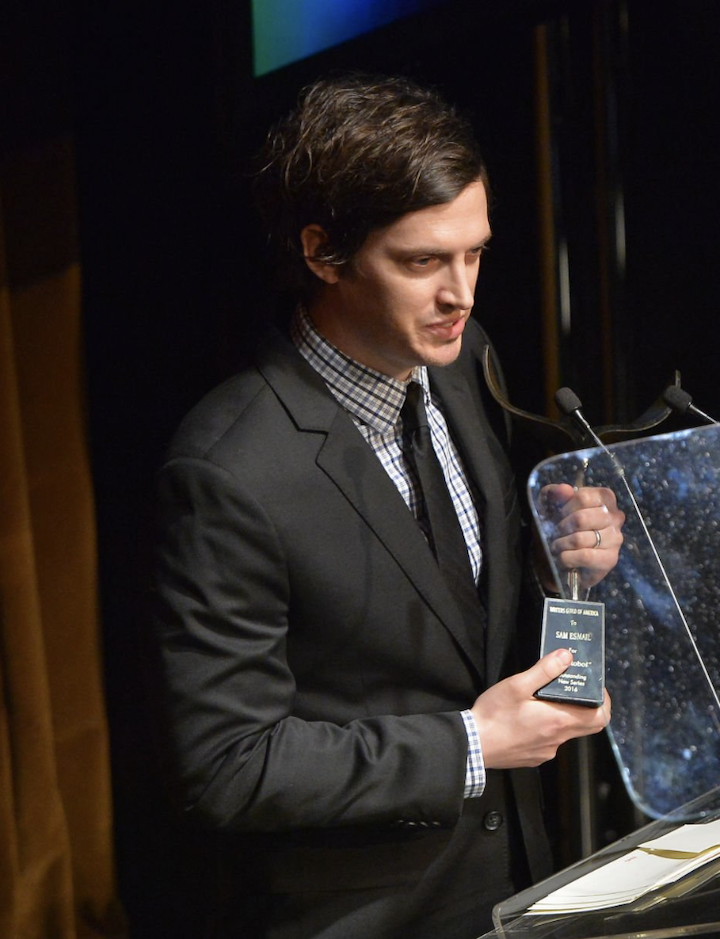
- Bradstreet at the 68th Annual WGA Awards; 2016
- Born: December 10, 1979 (age 46)
- Education: Buffalo State College
- Occupations: Writer, producer
- Years active: 2009–present

Kyle Bradstreet (born December 10, 1979) is an American television writer and producer. From 2015 to 2019, Bradstreet worked on the USA Network series Mr. Robot. He is the creator and the executive producer of the Disney+ miniseries Secret Invasion.

== Career ==
While attending Buffalo State College, he met television writer Tom Fontana, and upon graduating Bradstreet moved to New York City to work for Fontana, writing for his shows The Philanthropist, Copper, and Borgia. He also worked on Berlin Station as a consulting producer.

Bradstreet wrote and executive produced on the USA Network series Mr. Robot from 2015 to 2019, winning a Golden Globe Award, a Peabody Award and a Writers Guild of America Award. He was also nominated for the Primetime Emmy Award for Outstanding Drama Series in 2016.

In September 2020, Bradstreet was announced to be the creator and executive producer of a Nick Fury television series for the Marvel Cinematic Universe, eventually revealed to be Secret Invasion. The series premiered on June 21, 2023, on Disney+.

He will write and executive produce Alice Isn't Dead, a television series based on the podcast of the same name. He will also serve as showrunner.

In December 2025, The Hollywood Reporter listed Bradstreet as an executive producer of an upcoming series set in the Monsterverse for Legendary Entertainment and Apple TV, in which Wyatt Russell will reprise the role of a young Lee Shaw from Monarch: Legacy of Monsters.

== Personal life ==
Bradstreet was raised in Palmyra, New York. His mother, Lauren, is a reading specialist at Palmyra-Macedon High School, which Bradstreet graduated from in 1998. He also attended Buffalo State University, initially planning to become an English teacher. He currently lives in New York City.

== Filmography ==
Year	Title	Credited as		Notes
Year	Title	Writer	Producer	Notes
2009	The Philanthropist	Yes	No	Episode: "San Diego", also story editor and staff writer
2011	Borgia	Yes	No	Teleplay: "Ondata di calore", also story editor
2012–13	Copper	Yes	Yes	Wrote 7 episodes, supervising producer, also executive story editor
2015–19	Mr. Robot	Yes	Executive	Wrote 9 episodes, also supervising producer and co-executive producer
2016	Berlin Station	Yes	Yes	Consulting producer, wrote: "False Negative"
2023	Secret Invasion	Yes	Executive	Creator, writer, miniseries

== Awards and nominations ==
Year	Award	Category	Work	Result	Ref.
2016	Writers Guild of America Awards	New Series	Mr. Robot	Won	
2016	Writers Guild of America Awards	Drama Series	Mr. Robot	Nominated	
2016	Primetime Emmy Awards	Outstanding Drama Series	Mr. Robot	Nominated	
