= Brian Tucker (screenwriter) =

American screenwriter and producer

- Occupations: Screenwriter; Executive producer
- Years active: 2013–present
- Notable work: Broken City; Secret Invasion

Brian Tucker is an American screenwriter and executive producer best known for his work on Broken City and Secret Invasion.

== Career ==
Tucker gained notability from writing an unsolicited screenplay for Broken City (2013), which was bought by Mandate Pictures. The script made the 2008 Black List of "best, albeit unproduced, screenplays." Speaking about the finished film, Emily Helwig of The Hollywood Reporter said "Tucker's screenplay might have been the problem and that it may have been a better story told as a period piece." Michael Phillips of the Chicago Tribune had issues with the "coincidence and improbability" of Tucker's script. In January 2019, he wrote a script for a biopic based on the life of Angela Davis. In November 2019, it was announced that Tucker would script a remake of The Fugitive. In August 2021, it was revealed that Tucker had been hired to rewrite Todd McFarlane's screenplay for the upcoming Spawn reboot. Tucker was also attached to write the screenplay for a Sympathy for Mr. Vengeance remake and an original film titled Expiration. In April 2023, he was announced to have written all of the episodes of Secret Invasion, set in the Marvel Cinematic Universe. In November 2025, he wrote the action film Empire City (TBA).

== Filmography ==
Year	Title	Credited as		Notes	Ref.
Year	Title	Writer	Executive producer	Notes	Ref.
2013	Broken City	Yes	Yes		
2023	Secret Invasion	Yes	Yes	6 episodes	
TBA	Empire City	Yes	Yes	Post-production	
