= Kingsley Ben-Adir =

British actor (born 1986)

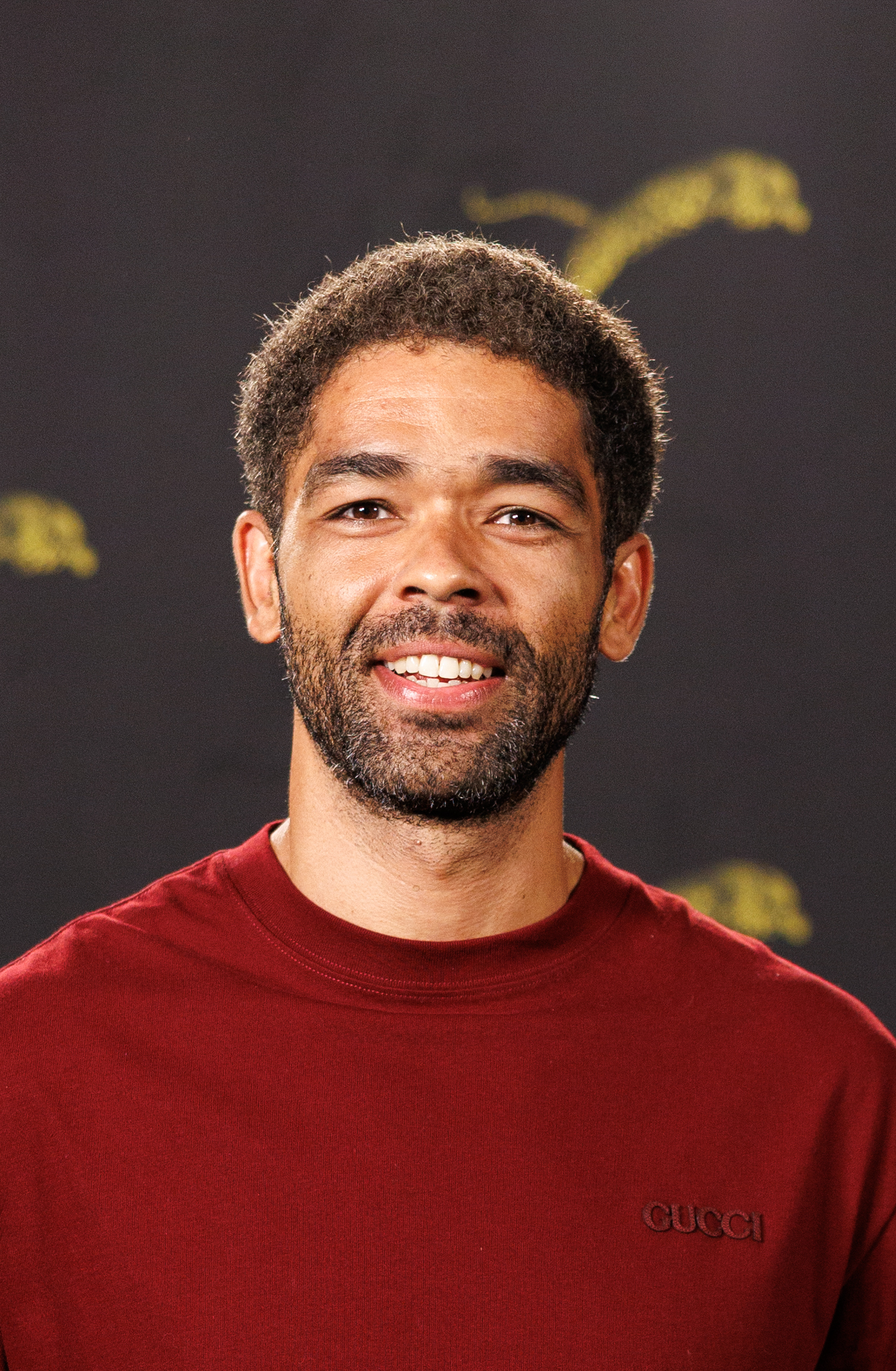
- Ben-Adir in 2026
- Born: 20 November 1986 (age 39); Kentish Town, London, England
- Education: Guildhall School of Music and Drama
- Occupation: Actor
- Years active: 2011–present
- Awards: List

Kingsley Ben-Adir (born 20 November 1986) is a British actor. His credits include playing pathologist Marcus Summer in ITV's Vera (2014–2018), private detective Karim Washington on Netflix's The OA (2019), Colonel Ben Younger in the BBC drama Peaky Blinders (2017–2019), and Gravik in the superhero miniseries Secret Invasion (2023).

He starred as Malcolm X in the Amazon Studios film One Night in Miami... (2020), for which he won the Gotham Independent Film Award for Breakthrough Performer, and as Bob Marley in Bob Marley: One Love (2024).

== Early life and education ==
Ben-Adir was born in Kentish Town, London, England. His maternal grandparents were from Trinidad and Tobago. His paternal grandparents were born in England; his surname is Hebrew, meaning son of the strong or mighty. He attended Rhyl Street Primary School in Kentish Town, London.

He attended secondary school at William Ellis School in Gospel Oak, Northwest London. He graduated from the Guildhall School of Music and Drama in 2011.

== Career ==
In 2011, Ben-Adir performed in Gillian Slovo's play The Riots at the Tricycle Theatre. In 2012, he played Demetrius in A Midsummer Night's Dream at Regent's Park Open Air Theatre.

In 2013, he played Borachio in Mark Rylance's production of Much Ado About Nothing at the Old Vic in London and also played in God's Property at the Soho Theatre.

In 2014, Ben-Adir performed in the play We Are Proud to Present a Presentation About the Herero of Namibia, Formerly Known as Southwest Africa, From the German Sudwestafrika, Between the Years 1884–1915 at the Bush Theatre in London. The play received positive reviews.

From 2017 to 2019, Ben-Adir appeared in series four and five of the BBC One television series Peaky Blinders, playing Colonel Ben Younger. He played private detective Karim Washington on Netflix's The OA (2019),

In 2020, Ben-Adir starred as Malcolm X in the Amazon Studios film One Night in Miami... directed by Regina King. In February 2022, Ben-Adir was cast as Bob Marley in the biopic Bob Marley: One Love, directed by Reinaldo Marcus Green and released on 14 February 2024.

In April 2022, he joined the ensemble cast of Barbie. In 2023, he appeared in the Marvel Cinematic Universe series Secret Invasion as Gravik, a Skrull rebel plotting to conquer Earth.

== Acting credits ==
=== Film ===
Year	Title	Role	Notes
2012	City Slacker	Thug	
2013	World War Z	Officer Hawkins	Uncredited
2016	Trespass Against Us	Sampson	
2017	King Arthur: Legend of the Sword	Wet Stick	
2018	The Commuter	Agent Garcia	
2019	Noelle	Jake Hapman	
2020	One Night in Miami...	Malcolm X	
2023	Barbie	Basketball Ken	
2024	Bob Marley: One Love	Bob Marley	
2026	Frank & Louis	Frank	
TBA	Scorn	TBA	Filming

=== Television ===
Year	Title	Role	Notes
2013	Agatha Christie's Marple	Errol	1 episode
2014–2018	Vera	Dr. Marcus Summer	Main role, 16 episodes
2016	Midsomer Murders	Bartholomew Hines	1 episode
2016	Ordinary Lies	Jake	1 episode
2017	Death in Paradise	Irie Johnson	1 episode
2017	Diana and I	Russell	Television film
2017–2019	Peaky Blinders	Col. Ben Younger	Main role, 5 episodes
2018	Deep State	Khalid Walker	4 episodes
2019	The OA	Karim Washington	Main role, 6 episodes
2020	High Fidelity	Russell McCormack	Recurring role, 7 episodes
2020	Love Life	Grant	1 episode
2020	The Comey Rule	Barack Obama	Miniseries, 2 episodes
2020	Soulmates	Franklin	1 episode
2023	Secret Invasion	Gravik	Miniseries, main role, 6 episodes
TBA	The Husbands		Upcoming series

=== Theatre ===
Year	Title	Role	Venue
2011	The Riots	Performer	Tricycle Theatre, London
2012	A Midsummer Night's Dream	Demetrius	Regent's Park Open Air Theatre, London
2013	Much Ado About Nothing	Borachio	The Old Vic, London
2013	God's Property		Soho Theatre, London
2014	We Are Proud to Present a Presentation About the Herero of Namibia, Formerly Known as Southwest Africa, From the German Sudwestafrika, Between the Years 1884–1915	Actor 2	Bush Theatre, London
2024	Cat on a Hot Tin Roof	Brick	Almeida, London

== Awards and nominations ==
Year	Award	Category	Work	Result
2021	British Academy Film Awards	Rising Star Award	Himself	Nominated
2021	Cannes Film Festival	Trophée Chopard of Male Revelation	Himself	Won
2021	Screen Actors Guild Award	Outstanding Cast in a Motion Picture	One Night in Miami	Nominated
2021	Independent Spirit Award	Robert Altman Award	One Night in Miami	Won
2020	Gotham Awards	Breakthrough Actor	One Night in Miami	Won
2020	Chicago Film Critics Association Awards	Most Promising Performer	One Night in Miami	Nominated
2020	San Francisco Film Awards	Outstanding Ensemble	One Night in Miami	Won
2020	Atlantic Film Critics Circle	Breakthrough Performer	One Night in Miami	Won
2020	Satellite Awards	Best Supporting Actor	One Night in Miami	Nominated
2020	Indiana Film Journalists Association	Best Actor	One Night in Miami	Nominated
