= Luma Pictures =

Visual effects studio

- Company type: Private
- Industry: Visual effects, CGI animation
- Founded: 2002
- Founder: Payam Shohadai, Jonathan R. Betuel
- Headquarters: Los Angeles, California, U.S.
- Additional offices: Melbourne, Victoria, Australia; Vancouver, British Columbia, Canada
- Key people: Grady Gamble, Vincent Cirelli, Jamy Zink, Shauna Bryan
- Website: https://www.luma.inc/

Luma Pictures is a visual effects/CGI animation studio with facilities in Los Angeles, Melbourne and Vancouver. Founded in 2002 by Payam Shohadai and Jonathan R. Beutel, the company is best known for their creatures, environments, and effects.

Luma Pictures has won several awards for their visual effects work, including an AACTA Award for Best Visual Effects on Spider-Man: Far From Home and Elvis.

The studio has also earned several Visual Effects Society (VES) nominations over the years, including nominations for Doctor Strange, Ant-Man, and Spider-Man: Far From Home.

Today, Luma Pictures is led by CEO Grady Gamble.

== History ==
Luma Pictures was founded in 2002 by Payam Shohadai and Jonathan R. Beutel, the latter of whom is known for writing the screenplay of The Last Starfighter (1984) and writing and directing Theodore Rex (1996).

The company debuted in 2002 with work on Charlie's Angels: Full Throttle, and since then it has completed visual effects on over 150 films and episodics, including Pirates of the Caribbean: At World's End, the Underworld franchise, Prisoners, Mary Poppins Returns, Candyman, the Marvel Cinematic Universe including the Spider-Man franchise, The Tomorrow War, and I Am Groot for which it was the lead VFX provider for the first season. Additionally, they have worked with film auteurs such as the Coen Brothers on four films, including No Country for Old Men and True Grit; Quentin Tarantino's Once Upon a Time in Hollywood; and Taika Waititi's Jojo Rabbit. Its headquarter changed from Venice, California to Los Angeles and company expanded to Melbourne, Australia in 2013 and Vancouver, British Columbia in 2021 and has grown to nearly 300 global employees.

== Filmography ==
=== Films ===
| Year | Notable films |
|---|---|
| 2003 | Charlie's Angels: Full Throttle; The Human Stain; Underworld; Bad Santa |
| 2004 | Wicker Park; Crash; Ray; Sky Captain and the World of Tomorrow |
| 2005 | Cursed; A Lot like Love; The Cave; Into the Blue |
| 2006 | Underworld: Evolution; Hoot; First Snow; Zoom; The Covenant; The Holiday; Apocalypto |
| 2007 | Primeval; Slipstream; Reign Over Me; Pirates of the Caribbean: At World's End; No Country for Old Men; Hostel: Part II; Rush Hour 3 Resident Evil: Extinction |
| 2008 | Henry Poole Is Here; Untraceable; Elegy; Never Back Down; Hancock; The Midnight Meat Train; Burn After Reading; City of Ember |
| 2009 | Possession; Underworld: Rise of the Lycans; X-Men Origins: Wolverine; Harry Potter and the Half-Blood Prince; The Ugly Truth; Gamer; A Serious Man; Fame; This is it |
| 2010 | The Nutcracker in 3D; The Book of Eli; Percy Jackson & the Olympians: The Lightning Thief; True Grit |
| 2011 | The Green Hornet; Battle: Los Angeles; Thor; X-Men: First Class; Captain America: The First Avenger; Fright Night; In Time |
| 2012 | Underworld: Awakening; One for the Money; The Avengers; The Dictator; Prometheus |
| 2013 | Thor: The Dark World; Prisoners; Oz the Great and Powerful; GI Joe: Retaliation; Iron Man 3 Saving Mr. Banks |
| 2014 | I, Frankenstein; Captain America: The Winter Soldier; Guardians of the Galaxy |
| 2015 | Run All Night; The Divergent Series: Insurgent; The Age of Adaline; Avengers: Age of Ultron; Ant-Man; The Vatican Tapes; The Last Witch Hunter; Heart of the Sea |
| 2016 | Deadpool; Captain America: Civil War; The Divergent Series: Allegiant; Doctor Strange; Underworld: Blood Wars |
| 2017 | Alien: Covenant; Guardians of the Galaxy Vol. 2 Spider-Man: Homecoming; Thor: Ragnarok |
| 2018 | Black Panther; A Wrinkle in Time; Ant-Man and the Wasp; Peppermint; Aquaman; Mary Poppins Returns; The Nutcracker and the Four Realms |
| 2019 | Captain Marvel; Spider-Man: Far From Home; Jojo Rabbit; Once Upon a Time in Hollywood |
| 2020 | Birds of Prey; Dolittle |
| 2021 | Godzilla vs. Kong; Space Jam: A New Legacy; Spider-Man: No Way Home; Eternals; King Richard; Candyman; Shang-Chi and the Legend of the Ten Rings; The Tomorrow War; Those Who Wish Me Dead |
| 2022 | The King's Daughter; Doctor Strange in the Multiverse of Madness; Elvis; Thor: Love and Thunder; Lyle, Lyle, Crocodile; Black Panther: Wakanda Forever |
| 2023 | Ant-Man and the Wasp: Quantumania; Ghosted; The Mother; Heart of Stone; Spy Kids: Armageddon; Rebel Moon |

=== TV series ===
| Year | Notable series |
|---|---|
| 2021 | WandaVision; Loki; Hawkeye |
| 2022-present | I Am Groot |
| 2023 | Citadel; Secret Invasion; Ahsoka; Gen V |
| 2024 | The Acolyte |
