= Zoic Studios =

American visual effects company

- Type: Private
- Industry: Visual effects
- Founded: 2002
- Headquarters: 3582 Eastham Dr., Culver City, California, USA,
- Key people: Loni Peristere (Founder, Executive Creative Director); Chris Jones (Founder, Executive Creative Director); Tim McBride (CFO / COO); Andrew Orloff (Executive Creative Director)
- Number of employees: 150
- Website: zoicstudios.com

Zoic Studios is an American visual effects company based in Culver City, California, specializing in visual effects for feature films, episodic television, commercials, video games, advertising design, and interactive online media, the company has separate sister facilities in Vancouver, British Columbia, Canada and New York City. The company provides R&D, software development, UI/UX design, and consulting for public and private clients. It is composed primarily of creative artists, producers and engineers. It has also developed a proprietary technology Z.E.U.S. - Zoic Environmental Unification System, which was used for the production of Once Upon a Time, allowing actors to view the virtual world before acting in it.

The studio has been awarded an Emmy award for work on CSI.

== History ==
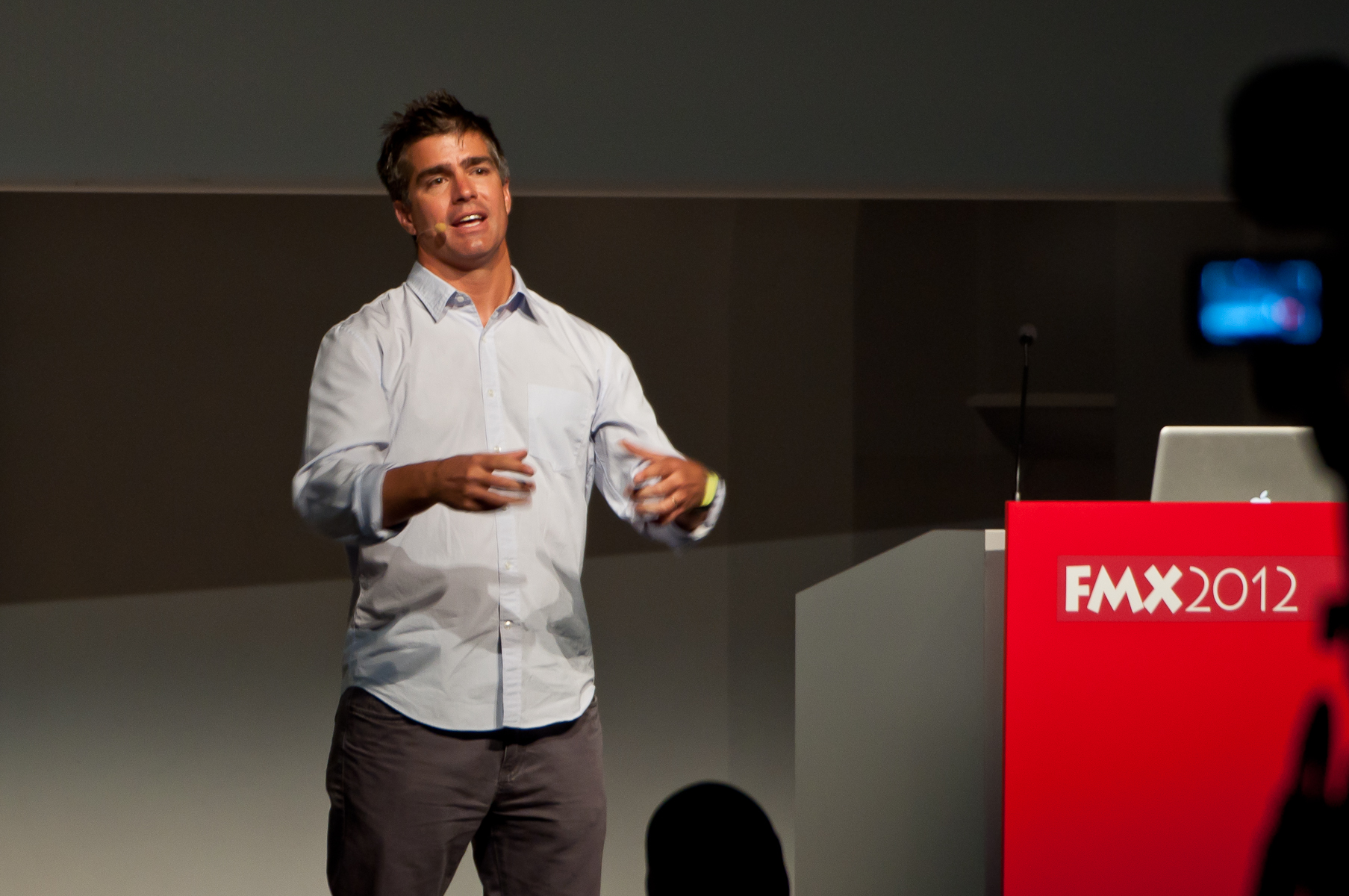
Loni Peristere talking about Virtual Production in Television at FMX 2012.

Zoic Studios was founded by four partners in 2002, Andrew Orloff, Loni Peristere, Chris Jones, Tim McBride. It began as a 15 person company working out of the Sunset Gower Studios lot. The first project of Zoic Studios was creating visual effects for the television series Firefly.

In September 2002, the company moved to Culver City, California, where they employed 150 employees.

In 2006, Zoic founded Zoic BC in Vancouver, British Columbia.

In 2016, Zoic opened an East Coast studio in NYC's Hell's Kitchen neighborhood.

== List of notable works ==
Type of media	Year	Name of work	Note
Television	2002	Firefly	
Television	2002	The Twilight Zone	
Television	2004	Battlestar Galactica	
Television	2007	Mad Men	
Television	2008	Breaking Bad	
Television	2008	Fringe	
Television	2008	True Blood	
Television	2009	V	
Television	2010	The Walking Dead	
Television	2011	Falling Skies	
Television	2011	Game of Thrones	
Television	2011	Once Upon a Time	
Television	2014	The Flash	
Television	2016	The Good Place	
Television	2017	Future Man	
Television	2017	The Defenders	
Television	2017	A Series of Unfortunate Events	
Television	2018	Chilling Adventures of Sabrina	
Television	2018	Cloak & Dagger	
Television	2019	The Boys	
Television	2019	Lucifer	
Television	2022	The Orville	
Feature film	2004	Spider-Man 2	
Feature film	2004	The Day After Tomorrow	
Feature film	2004	Van Helsing	
Feature film	2009	District 9	
Feature film	2009	Zombieland	
Feature film	2010	Red	
Feature film	2011	Limitless	
Feature film	2014	Big Eyes	
Feature film	2015	Avengers: Age of Ultron	
Feature film	2015	Hot Tub Time Machine 2	
Feature film	2016	Crouching Tiger, Hidden Dragon: Sword of Destiny	
Feature film	2016	Keeping Up with the Joneses	
Feature film	2018	The Ballad of Buster Scruggs	
Feature film	2025	The Wizard of Oz at Sphere	Immersive version of the 1939 film
