= Ali Selim =

Egyptian-American film and television director

- Born: 1960 or 1961 (age 65–66); Saint Paul, Minnesota, U.S.
- Occupations: Director, writer, producer
- Years active: late 1980s–present
- Spouse: Robin Engstrom
- Website: www.aliselim.com

Ali Selim (born 1960/1961) is an American film and television director. Over the past fifteen years he has directed over 850 television commercials, five half-hour documentaries and several music videos.

== Early life ==
Selim was born in Saint Paul, Minnesota to an Egyptian father and a German mother. His parents were Dr. Mohamed Ali Selim and wife Evelyn Niemeier. He has two siblings. His father died in 2015 at the age of 91, and was a professor of economics at the University of St. Thomas.

== Career ==
His first project, a documentary celebrating the centennial of Saint Thomas Academy, won awards at several international film festivals. Selim formed his own production company (Departure Films) in 1989. He directed a number of award-winning television commercials, including a public service announcement for the YMCA which received a Gold Lion, advertising's most coveted award, from Cannes Advertising Film Festival in 1991. Later that year, Selim was hired by Giraldi/Suarez Productions.

In 1993 Selim wrote, produced and directed Yonnondio, a 15-minute music video in collaboration with Academy Award-winning composer Peter Buffett which was awarded the Silver Hugo from the Chicago International Film Festival and a CINE Golden. Selim was an honoree at the AICP Show, "The Art and Technique of the American Television Commercial," where his work was placed in the permanent collection of the Museum of Modern Art in New York City.

His script for the film Sweet Land, based on a short story by Will Weaver, was the only screenplay selected for the inaugural year of the Cyngus Emerging Filmmakers Institute. The film, which took him fifteen years to finance, was shot in 2005 around Chippewa County, Minnesota. It starred Alan Cumming, Ned Beatty, Elizabeth Reaser, Alex Kingston and John Heard. The film was the recipient of the 2005 Audience Award for Best Narrative Feature Film at the 13th Annual Hamptons International Film Festival, the 2006 Florida Film Festival: Audience Award for Best Narrative Feature, and the 2007 Independent Spirit Awards: Best First Feature.

His narrative film Emperor of the Air (1996), based on Ethan Canin's story of the same name, was awarded the top prize at Worldfest and the D. L. Mayberry Award. Selim was placed on Advertising Weekly's list of the top 1% most sought-after directors in the United States.

In May 2021, Selim was hired to direct episodes of the series Secret Invasion for Disney+. He ultimately directed all 6 episodes.

== Personal life ==
Selim is married to Robin Engstrom, of Swedish descent. He lives in Portland, Oregon.

== Filmography ==
Short film

Year	Title	Director	Writer	Producer	Notes
1996	Emperor of the Air	Yes	Yes	Yes	Credited as Ali Mohamed Selim
2020	Le Tour de Pants with Ali Selim	No	Yes	No	Documentary short, also narrator

Feature film

Year	Title	Director	Writer	Producer
2005	Sweet Land	Yes	Yes	Yes

Television

Year	Title	Director	Writer	Notes
2010	In Treatment	Yes	No	6 episodes
2011	Criminal Minds	Yes	No	Episode "Today I Do"
2014	Gracepoint	Yes	No	Episode "Episode Seven"
2017	Hand of God	Yes	No	Episode "I See That Now"
2018	The Looming Tower	Yes	Yes	Directed 2 episodes, wrote 2 episodes, also story editor
2020	Manhunt	Yes	No	2 episodes
2020	Condor	Yes	No	2 episodes
2021	Hit & Run	No	Yes	Episode "Hide & Seek"
2022	61st Street	Yes	No	2 episodes
2022	The Calling	Yes	No	Episode "The Horror"
2023	Secret Invasion	Yes	No	Miniseries, also executive producer

== Awards and nominations ==
Year	Award	Category	Work	Result
2005	Hamptons International Film Festival Audience Awards	Best Narrative Feature	Sweet Land	Won
2006	Florida Film Festival Audience Awards	Best Narrative Feature	Sweet Land	Won
2006	Vail Film Festival Audience Choice Awards	Best Feature	Sweet Land	Won
2006	Wisconsin Film Festival Audience Awards	Best Dramatic Film	Sweet Land	Won
2007	Independent Spirit Awards	Best First Feature	Sweet Land	Won
2019	USC Scripter Awards	Television	The Looming Tower (for "9/11")	Nominated
2019	Writers Guild of America Awards	Long Form – Adapted	The Looming Tower	Nominated
