= FuseFX =

US visual effects company

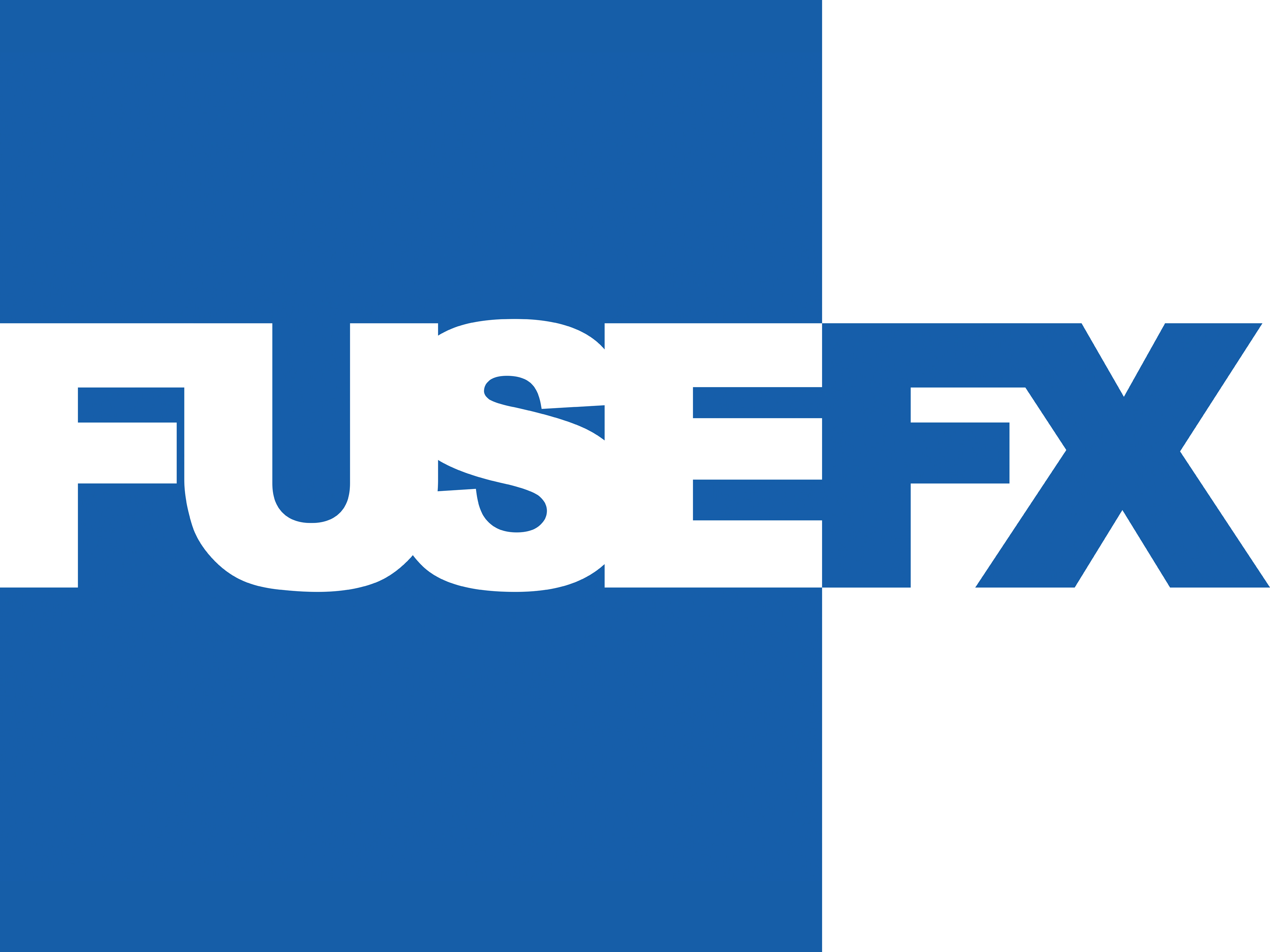
- Formerly: The Outfit
- Industry: Special visual effects
- Founded: 2006
- Headquarters: Los Angeles, California, United States
- Key people: David Altenau (CEO); Tim Jacobsen (CDO); Jason Fotter (CTO)
- Products: Films; Television series Virtual realities Commercials
- Number of employees: +1,000
- Subsidiaries: Folks VFX; Rising Sun Pictures; El Ranchito VFX

FuseFX (formerly known as The Outfit) was an American special visual effects company which was founded in Los Angeles, California in 2006 by David Altenau, Tim Jacobsen and Jason Fotter. The company is best known for developing special visual effects for television series, films, commercials and virtual realities.

In January 2025, it was announced that all FuseFX offices would be rebranded under their sister VFX studio, Folks VFX, effectively retiring FuseFX as a brand.

== History ==
=== Founding ===
FuseFX was founded in 2006 as The Outfit by David Altenau, with co-partners Tim Jacobson and Jason Fotter.

=== Expansion and acquisitions ===
2014: FuseFX expanded by launching offices in Vancouver and New York City.

2016: FuseFX consolidated its multiple locations in Burbank to a larger campus in Sherman Oaks.

2018: EagleTree Capital, a New York-based private equity and investment firm, acquired a majority stake in FuseFX. The Investment group provides financial backing to support continued growth globally as the studio scales to support larger and more complex productions.

2020, February: FuseFX opened its third office, located in Atlanta.

2020, April: FuseFX acquires Folks VFX, adding locations in Montreal, Toronto, and Bogotá, Colombia.

2021, April: FuseFX acquires Rising Sun Pictures a high-end visual effects studio headquartered in Adelaide, South Australia. Rising Sun Pictures co-founder Tony Clark continues to lead the studio.

2021, November: FuseFX opens a new Folks VFX studio in Saguenay, Quebec. The Saguenay location operates as an extension of the Montréal facility and aims to create 60 to 70 skilled jobs with this expansion. The Saguenay location becomes the tenth studio location in the FuseFX portfolio and brings the number of global employees to over 1000.

2022, June: FuseFX acquires El Ranchito VFX based out of Madrid, Spain with additional location in Barcelona. "The Fuse Group" is established as a parent-brand of FuseFX, Folks VFX, Rising Sun Pictures, and El Ranchito VFX.

2022, August: FuseFX sister studio Folks VFX opens Mumbai studio location.

2023, January: The Fuse Group rebrands as "The Pitch Black Company", with David Altenau taking position as Chairman of Pitch Black. Sébastien Bergeron, former president of Folks VFX, is named CEO of Pitch Black.

2025, January: Folks VFX absorbs the FuseFX brand, with all former FuseFX studio locations rebranding as Folks VFX locations.

== Description ==
The company had offices in Los Angeles, New York, Vancouver, and Atlanta.

== Film and television credits ==
=== Film credits ===
- Wendell & Wild (2022)
- The Kissing Booth 2 (2020)
- Annabelle Comes Home (2019)
- Captive State (2019)
- Super Troopers 2 (2018)
- Tomb Raider (2018) - Additional Visual Effects
- Vice (2018)
- The Current War: Director's Cut (2017) - Additional Visual Effects
- American Made (2017) - Additional Visual Effects
- Wish Upon (2017)
- The Wall (2017)
- The Purge: Election Year (2016)
- Winter Light (2015)
- Jessabelle (2014)
- Annabelle (2014)
- The Giver (2014) Lidar and Cyber Scanning
- Sinister (2012)
- Volcano Girl (2011)
- Faster (2010) - Additional visual effects

== Television credits ==
FuseFX's work has appeared in episodes of Criminal Minds, Agents of S.H.I.E.L.D., American Horror Story, The Blacklist, and Preacher, among others.

Other TV credits include:

- Ms. Marvel (2022)
- The Terminal List (2022)
- A League of Their Own (2022)
- Winning Time The Rise of the Lakers Dynasty (2022)
- Raising Dion (2022)
- DMZ (2022)
- Naomi (2022)
- Dexter (2022)
- Loki (2021)
- Them: Convenant (2021)
- The Flight Attendant (2021)
- Debris (2021)
- Ratched (2020)
- Upload (2020)
- Snowpiercer (2020)
- Outer Banks (2020)
- Hollywood (2020)
- Penny Dreadful: City of Angels (2020)
- Agents of S.H.I.E.L.D. Seasons 1-7 (2013-2020)
- Mayans M.C. Season 2 (2019)
- The Tick Seasons 1-2 (2017-2019)
- American Crime Story Seasons 1-2 (2016-2018)
- Luke Cage Season 1 (2016)
- Bosch Season 3 (2016)
- The 100 Seasons 6-7 (2019-2020)
- American Horror Story Seasons 1-10 (2011-2019)
- Hell on Wheels Seasons 2-4 (2012-2014)
- The Chicago Code (2011)
- Green Eggs and Ham (2022)

== Awards and nominations ==
Awards and nominations
Year	Project	Award	For	Result
2022	Snowpiercer	Emmy Award	Outstanding Visual Effects	Nominated
2022	9-1-1: Lone Star	VES Award	Outstanding Supporting Visual Effects in a Photoreal Episode	Nominated
2021	9-1-1	HPA Award	Outstanding Visual Effects – Television (Over 13 Episodes)	Won
2021	9-1-1: Lone Star	HPA Award	Outstanding Visual Effects – Television (Over 13 Episodes)	Nominated
2021	Agents of S.H.I.E.L.D.	Australian Effects & Animation Award	Best TV Series - Bronze Award	Won
2021	I Know This Much Is True	HPA Award	Outstanding Supporting Visual Effects in a Photoreal Episode	Nominated
2021	Survive	VES Award	Outstanding Supporting Visual Effects in a Photoreal Episode	Nominated
2020	9-1-1	HPA Award	Outstanding Visual Effects – Television (Over 13 Episodes)	Won
2019	The Orville	HPA Award	Outstanding Visual Effects – Television (Over 13 Episodes)	Won
2019	9-1-1	HPA Award	Outstanding Visual Effects – Television (Over 13 Episodes)	Nominated
2019	The Orville	Emmy Award	Outstanding Special Visual Effects	Nominated
2019	Deadwood: The Movie	Emmy Award	Outstanding Special Visual Effects in a Supporting Role	Nominated
2018	Mr. Robot	Emmy Award	Outstanding Special Visual Effects in a Supporting Role	Nominated
2018	Agents of S.H.I.E.L.D.	HPA Award	Outstanding Visual Effects – Television (Over 13 Episodes)	Won
2018	A Trip to Mars with Buzz Aldrin in Virtual Reality	Webby Award	Webby Winner: Video: VR: Branded Cinematic or Pre-Rendered	Won
2018	A Trip to Mars with Buzz Aldrin in Virtual Reality	Webby Award	People's Voice Winner: Video: VR: Branded Cinematic or Pre-Rendered	Won
2017	Agents of S.H.I.E.L.D.	VES Award	Outstanding Visual Effects in a Photoreal Episode	Nominated
2017	Mr. Robot	VES Award	Outstanding Visual Effects in a Photoreal Episode	Nominated
2015	American Horror Story: Freak Show	Emmy Award	Outstanding Special Visual Effects in a Supporting Role	Won
2015	Agents of S.H.I.E.L.D.	Emmy Award	Outstanding Special Visual Effects	Nominated
2014	American Horror Story: Freak Show	VES Award	Outstanding Supporting Visual Effects in a Visual Effects-Driven Photoreal/Live Action Broadcast Program	Won
2014	American Horror Story: Freak Show	VES Award	Outstanding Compositing in a Photoreal/Live Action Broadcast	Nominated
2014	Agents of S.H.I.E.L.D.	Emmy Award	Outstanding Special Visual Effects	Nominated
2014	Agents of S.H.I.E.L.D.	VES Award	Outstanding Visual Effects in a Visual Effects-Driven Photoreal/Live Action Broadcast Program	Nominated
2013	Last Resort	Emmy Award	Outstanding Special Visual Effects	Nominated
