= Promises (Secret Invasion) =

- Secret Invasion episode
- Promotional poster
- Episode no.: Episode 2
- Directed by: Ali Selim
- Story by: Brant Englestein; Brian Tucker
- Teleplay by: Brian Tucker
- Cinematography by: Remi Adefarasin (Note: Eben Bolter served as the cinematographer during additional photography, which occurred over four months.)
- Editing by: Melissa Lawson Cheung
- Original release date: June 28, 2023
- Running time: 58 minutes

Cast
- Cobie Smulders as Maria Hill; Irmena Chichikova as Kreega; Seeta Indrani as Shirley Sagar; Christopher Goh as Jack Hyun-Bin; Giampiero Judica as NATO Sec. Gen Caspani; Ben Peel as John Brogan; Anna Madeley as Pamela Lawton; Michael Epp as Ruben Steiner; Mark Bazeley as Victor Dalton; Juliet Stevenson as Elizabeth Hill; Lucas Persaud as Young Skrull Gravik; Charlotte Baker as Soren; Kate Braithwaite as Skrull Soren

Episode chronology
← Previous "Resurrection"	Next → "Betrayed"

"Promises" is the second episode of the American television series Secret Invasion, based on Marvel Comics comic book crossover Secret Invasion. It follows Nick Fury trying to prevent a Skrull insurgency following a rebel faction, led by Gravik, staging an explosion in Moscow, Russia. The episode is set in the Marvel Cinematic Universe (MCU), sharing continuity with the films of the franchise. It was written by Brian Tucker and Brant Englestein, and directed by Ali Selim.

Samuel L. Jackson reprises his role as Nick Fury from previous MCU media, along with Ben Mendelsohn as Talos, with Kingsley Ben-Adir, Charlayne Woodard, Killian Scott, Samuel Adewunmi, Christopher McDonald, Katie Finneran, Emilia Clarke, Olivia Colman, and Don Cheadle also starring. Selim joined the series by May 2021 to direct all episodes. The episode received mixed reviews, with some critics noting the improved exposition and praising the performances (particularly those of Jackson, Mendelsohn, Kingsley Ben-Adir, Colman, and Cheadle) but expressing issues with the writing and the revelation of Fury's wife, Priscilla, to be a Skrull.

"Promises" was released on Disney+ on June 28, 2023.

== Plot ==
In 1997, (Note: Two years after the events of Captain Marvel (2019)) Nick Fury meets a young Gravik and consoles him while giving a speech to the Skrull immigrants, promising to find them a new home. In the present day, after escaping from the bombing attack, Fury learns from Talos that there are a million Skrulls living on Earth amongst the humans. An angered Fury parts way with Talos, and later meets with Maria Hill's mother, Elizabeth, to explain the circumstances of her death. As the United States is implicated in the bombing attack, Gravik meets with members of the Skrull Council, who express disapproval of his actions. Gravik reminds the Council of Fury's failure to deliver on his promise, and appoints himself the new Skrull General with the majority in favor. Council member Shirley Sagar, who refuses to submit, secretly contacts Talos, who asks her to set up a meeting between him and Gravik. In London, Fury meets with Colonel James Rhodes and explains to him the Skrull threat. To Fury's dismay, Rhodes gives him a military discharge, due to his presence at the bombing attack which escalated the tension between the United States and other international governments. Sonya Falsworth arrives at a butcher shop, where one of the Skrulls, Brogan, is imprisoned, and interrogates him. She learns that Gravik is building a machine for the purpose of strengthening the Skrulls, and a scientist couple named Dalton is involved. G'iah secretly discovers that the Skrulls are experimenting on various alien samples. Afterwards, she accompanies Gravik on a mission to rescue Brogan. Suspecting him of having talked, Gravik has Brogan executed. Later, Fury returns to his home where he is greeted by his wife, Priscilla, who is clandestinely a Skrull.

== Production ==
=== Development ===
In September 2020, Kyle Bradstreet was revealed to be developing a television series for the streaming service Disney+ centered on Nick Fury, which was revealed that December to be Secret Invasion. Samuel L. Jackson was reprising his role as Fury, co-starring with Ben Mendelsohn in his MCU role of Talos. Ali Selim joined the series in May 2021 to direct, originally to split the episodes with Thomas Bezucha; Bezucha left the series before production began, and Selim ultimately directed all six episodes. Marvel Studios' Feige, Louis D'Esposito, Victoria Alonso, Brad Winderbaum, and Jonathan Schwartz served as executive producers on the series alongside Jackson, Selim, Bradstreet, and Brian Tucker. The second episode, titled "Promises", was written by Tucker from a teleplay by Tucker and Brant Englestein.

=== Writing ===
The character Rosa Dalton is introduced in the episode, a scientist working with the Skrulls researching various DNA samples for the Harvest project. Some of these DNA samples include Groot, Cull Obsidian, a Frost Beast, and the Extremis virus, which was theorized to lead to the creation of the MCU's version of the Super-Skrull.

The episode contains two scenes which had personal significance for Jackson, one in which Fury and Talos escape from Moscow, Russia on a train, and the other being Fury requesting assistance from Colonel James "Rhodey" Rhodes to deal with the threat of Skrulls. In the first scene, Fury begins discussing his childhood experience when he had ridden the train with his mother from Detroit, Michigan to Alabama bringing their meals in a shoebox. Selim had said that Jackson was connected to Fury in a way "no writer could ever be" as it had not been included in the script. Jackson had revealed that it had paralleled his own experiences during his youth, as he had travelled via train from Chattanooga, Tennessee to Washington, D.C. During the train rides, Jackson could not access the dining cars and had been provided meals in a shoebox due to segregation, and had decided to use the experience to give Fury "the kind of history that he has, to inform the story in a real way about, you know, how he wasn't always this [powerful], or he does look at America in another kind of way". Selim had related to the difficulties of Fury, identifying the "core" of his journey to be "the more universal sense of that is a story about the other: the other that's in himself, the other he feels in society". Jackson had also felt that the Skrull refugees living on Earth had paralleled the contemporary geopolitical climate, which had also caused many refugee influxes and crises. For the latter scene, Rhodes reveals he was aware of the threat and rejects his requests. Subsequently, Fury tries to evoke his experience being an African American to appeal to him, citing his experience working for secret Hydra agent Alexander Pierce. (Note: As depicted in Captain America: The Winter Soldier (2014)) Jackson had previously discussed with the writers on how to address Fury being an important figure and a Black man. He had said that "Rhodey and Fury have risen to this place where we have a certain amount of power, even though we're better than the people who have power, we still got to suppress ourselves in a specific way".

The decision to include Priscilla, Nick Fury's wife, was done with the intention of revealing more of Fury's personal life to the audience, with Selim noting that audiences had not yet seen his "home life" yet up until that point, adding that he thought "revealing a wife is more interesting than revealing a leather sofa". Additionally, he had also thought that it made sense that Fury would choose to keep his personal life private, as it would justify the reason for his absence; Selim stated that "if you're hiding [but have] no attachments, it's not as interesting as if you're hiding from somebody as significant and influential as a wife or a child in your life. To bring him back and say he's been ignoring part of his personal life is really part of what Nick's character is." Selim had also concluded by noting that Fury was also facing internal turmoil while dealing with the threat of the Skrulls. Jackson had also expressed similar sentiments, noting that Fury's love had allowed him to become vulnerable, while acknowledging that it had been a "tortured kind of romance". He had also conceded that his love for Priscilla had been genuine despite the circumstances, and added that "[Being a husband] might be harder than that other life he has! That is not an easy person living in that house with him, apparently".

=== Casting ===
The episode stars Samuel L. Jackson as Nick Fury and Ben Mendelsohn as Talos, Kingsley Ben-Adir as Gravik, Charlayne Woodard as Priscilla Fury, Killian Scott as Pagon, Samuel Adewunmi as Beto, Christopher McDonald as Chris Stearn, Katie Finneran as Rosa Dalton, Emilia Clarke as G'iah, Olivia Colman as Sonya Falsworth, and Don Cheadle as James "Rhodey" Rhodes. Also appearing are Cobie Smulders as Maria Hill, Irmena Chichikova as Kreega, Seeta Indrani as Shirley Sagar, Christopher Goh as Jack Hyun-Bin, Giampiero Judica as Secretary General of NATO Caspani, Ben Peel as John Brogan, Anna Madeley as Pamela Lawton, Michael Epp as Ruben Steiner, Mark Bazeley as Victor Dalton, Juliet Stevenson as Elizabeth Hill, Lucas Persaud as Young Skrull Gravik, Charlotte Baker as Soren, and Kate Braithwaite as Skrull Soren.

=== Filming and visual effects ===
Filming took place at Pinewood Studios, as well as Hallmark House, from September 2021 to April 2022, with Selim directing, and Remi Adefarasin serving as cinematographer. Eben Bolter served as the cinematographer during additional photography which lasted for four months. Filming occurred at Berners Tavern in London. Archive footage from Captain Marvel (2019) is used for the opening sequence. The episode marks the first direct collaboration between Samuel L. Jackson and Don Cheadle. Selim had called directing the scene "one of the highlights of my career". He had also felt that they had similar acting styles, and as such, found the experience of the two working together to "come up with the emotional truth in that [restaurant scene" to be different than that of Jackson and Ben Mendelsohn acting together in the train scene, whom he had deemed to have different acting styles.

Visual effects were provided by SDFX Studios, Lola Visual Effects, Tippett Studio, Zoic Studios, Cantina Creative, Barnstorm VFX, One of Us, Bot VFX, Digital Domain, Base FX, and Phantom FX.

== Release ==
"Promises" was released on Disney+ on June 28, 2023, and was made available on Hulu along with the first and third episodes from July 21 to August 17, 2023.

== Reception ==
=== Audience viewership ===
According to Whip Media's TV Time, Secret Invasion was the most watched original series across all platforms in the United States during the week of July 2, 2023. According to Nielsen Media Research who measure the number of minutes watched by United States audiences on television sets, Secret Invasion was the sixth-most watched original series across streaming services for the week of June 26-July 2, 2023, with 464 million minutes watched, which was a 0.65% increase from the previous week.

=== Critical response ===
The review aggregator website Rotten Tomatoes reports a 50% approval rating based on 18 reviews. The site's critical consensus reads, "Secret Invasion's promise grows ever fainter in a subpar second episode that gets some mileage out of Samuel L. Jackson and Don Cheadle's chemistry but otherwise struggles to generate much intrigue."

Daniel Chin from The Ringer had begun by appreciating the episode had provided more exposition than the previous, which he felt that "Resurrections" had not done sufficiently. He had also better understood the threat of the Skrulls' situation and enjoyed the increased screentime Gravik and Sonya Falsworth had received, commenting that it had displayed their ruthlessness as they had "no qualms about crossing moral lines to protect their people's interests". However, he had minor issues with the pacing and did not enjoy the dialogue, particularly during the restaurant scene with Fury and Rhodes. Chin had felt the reveal that Fury's wife, Priscilla, was a Skrull did not have the intended emotional weight as it had occurred abruptly, comparing it to Maria Hill's death in "Resurrections" and saying that if the show had kept revealing key characters to be Skrull, the series would lose its suspense. For The Daily Beast, Fletcher Peters had mixed thoughts on the train scene, in which Fury warns Talos that humanity would be intolerant of the Skrulls due to current discrimination. She had appreciated the choice to address civil rights issues, but felt that it was a "little weird" to "start comparing the treatment of this fake alien race to actual problems that real humans face". Additionally, Peters opined that the exploration of theme of when the wage a violent revolution was superior to that of humans' intolerance, feeling that it was a viable possibility following the scene in which Gravik meets the world's leaders, revealed to be Skrulls, and one Skrull disagrees with his plan to invade Earth. She also did not enjoy the revelation of Priscilla to be a Skrull and was "peeved" due to the amount of plot twists, writing that an alternate possibility could've simply been to ensure "everyone has already gone full-Skrull, and the humans are gone", but had appreciated Colman's performance, citing it as the episode's best moment. However, Space.com writer Franz Ruiz had enjoyed Fury's reaction to Talos's revelation that there are millions of Skrull refugees on Earth, deeming it to be "more compelling than anything in the first episode". He had also liked the opening scene and thought the de-aging effects were superior to that of The Mandalorian and The Book of Boba Fett, and unlike Peters, deemed Mendelsohn's performance to be the best in the episode. Though he had not still been impressed with Secret Invasion yet, he had thought that its "core ideas" would be engaging "as long as the writers don't stumble".

Den of Geek's Kirsten Howard, rating the episodes 3 out of 5 stars, had also deemed the episode an improvement from the first. The opening sequence had caused her to hate Fury as she had felt he was indoctrinating the Skrulls with false promises. She had also enjoyed Colman's performance and especially observed Kingsley Ben-Adir's performance, calling it "blistering", as the episode had revealed the "gravity" of Gravik's "simmering rage against Nick and the rest of humanity". Unlike previous reviewers, she had enjoyed the revelation of Priscilla being a Skrull, desiring to learn more about their relationship and how she had coped with the difficulties the Skrulls had been facing. Howard had also enjoyed the scenes between Fury and Talos, and Fury and Rhodey, but commented that Nick was a "narrative pawn flitting between bits of exposition-y MCU plot". Giving the episode a C+ grade, Sam Barsanti at The A.V. Club had felt the episode "makes a stronger case for the argument that Fury's not doing so hot", feeling that the previous episode had been too focused on Fury's vulnerability. Barsanti ha enjoyed the interaction between Fury and Maria Hill's mother, Elizabeth Hill, who wanted him to ensure that Hil's death wasn't in vain. However, he had particularly acknowledged the interaction between Fury and Rhodes, and enjoying how Fury had referenced Alexander Pierce, calling it the "kind of nice little lore acknowledgement that I don't think MCU stories do often enough". Jesse Hassenger from Vulture began by critiquing the opening sequence, feeling that it was inane that the Skrulls had blindly obeyed Fury's requests, and Fury had not fully explained the situation to the Skrulls, writing that the series was "already taking some shortcuts to keep its undercover-Skrull story from undermining a bunch of continuity — and in doing so, is undermining other aspects of itself". While he had felt the scenes between Fury and Talos, and Fury and Rhodes were "compelling", he did not appreciate the cinematography and advocated for "interesting compositions that build on their actorly tension" rather than shot/reverse shot composition. When examining the interaction between Fury and Rhodes, he was entertained by the chemistry of Jackson and Cheadle, although he also commented that "it's missing the shades of moral ambiguity that characterized Fury in his movie outings; here, his failures are abstracted off-screen, so there's never much sense that Rhodes could be in the right here". Hassenger was also interested in the "implicit" class conflict between the assimilated Skrulls and Gravik's rebellious factions, but opined it to be "relegated to expositional dialogue rather than action or story" and wished for Secret Invasion to align more closely with the tone of The X-Files. He had given the episode a 2/5.
