= Cape Feare =

- The Simpsons episode
- The episode's 1993 promotional art
- Episode no.: Season 5 Episode 2
- Directed by: Rich Moore
- Written by: Jon Vitti
- Production code: 9F22
- Original air date: October 7, 1993

Guest appearance
- Kelsey Grammer as Sideshow Bob

Episode features
- Chalkboard gag: "The cafeteria deep fryer is not a toy"
- Couch gag: (first) The family dances along with various circus performers in a kickline. / (second) After arriving in Terror Lake, the family (as "The Thompsons") sits on their new couch, only to get covered by a falling mound of fish.
- Commentary: Matt Groening; Al Jean; Jon Vitti

Episode chronology
← Previous "Homer's Barbershop Quartet"	Next → "Homer Goes to College"
- The Simpsons season 5

"Cape Feare" is the second episode of the fifth season of the American animated television series The Simpsons. It originally aired on the Fox network in the United States on October 7, 1993. The episode features guest star Kelsey Grammer in his third appearance as Sideshow Bob, who attempts to kill Bart Simpson (Nancy Cartwright) again after getting out of jail, spoofing the 1962 film Cape Fear and its 1991 remake. Both films are based on John D. MacDonald's 1957 novel The Executioners and allude to other horror films such as Psycho.

This episode was written by Jon Vitti and was the final episode directed by Rich Moore, who went on to be the supervising director of The Critic. The idea was pitched by Wally Wolodarsky, who wanted to parody Cape Fear. Originally produced for the fourth season, it was held over to the fifth alongside "the premiere episode". The production crew found it difficult to stretch "Cape Feare" to the standard duration of half an hour (minus commercials), and consequently padded several scenes. In one such sequence, Sideshow Bob continually steps on rakes, the handles of which then hit him in the face; this scene has been cited as one of the show's most memorable moments, becoming a recurring gag. The score received an Emmy Award nomination.

== Plot ==
Sideshow Bob sends anonymous threatening letters in the mail to Bart from prison, wanting revenge on Bart for his two previous defeats. (Note: As depicted in the 1990 episode "Krusty Gets Busted" and the 1992 episode "Black Widower") Bob is soon paroled; the parole board no longer considers him a threat to society, despite the previous incidents and him having a tattoo reading "Die Bart Die" (which he claims is German for "The Bart The"). After encountering Bob at a local movie theater and realizing he sent the letters, the Simpsons join the Witness Protection Program, which relocates them to a houseboat in Terror Lake and changes their surname to "Thompson". As the family drives to their new home, they are unaware that Bob is strapped to the underside of the car. While suspended there, Bob is hit with speed bumps, has hot coffee poured on him by Homer, and is driven through a large cactus patch. After arriving in Terror Lake, Bob unstraps himself from the car and steps on rakes several times, injuring himself. Bob encounters Bart, but is promptly trampled by a parade of several elephants.

During the night, Bob reaches the houseboat and unmoors it from the dock. He ties up Homer, Marge, Lisa, Maggie and Santa's Little Helper so they cannot stop him. Bob then enters Bart's room and almost dispatches him as he flees out of the window. Bob catches up to Bart and corners him at the edge of the boat, offering him a last request. Having noticed a sign saying Springfield is fifteen miles away, Bart quickly has an idea: to stall for time, he compliments Bob on his beautiful voice and asks him to sing the entire score of H.M.S. Pinafore. Delighted by Bart's compliment, Bob grants his request by delivering a performance that includes several props, costumes and backdrops.

As the musical concludes, Bob prepares to murder Bart until the boat runs aground, knocking him off his feet and preventing him from doing so. Bob is arrested by Chief Wiggum, whose police force was patronizing a riverside brothel. With Bob defeated once more, the Simpsons return home and discover that Grampa has grown breasts and long hair because he had left his medications inside the formerly abandoned house.

== Production ==
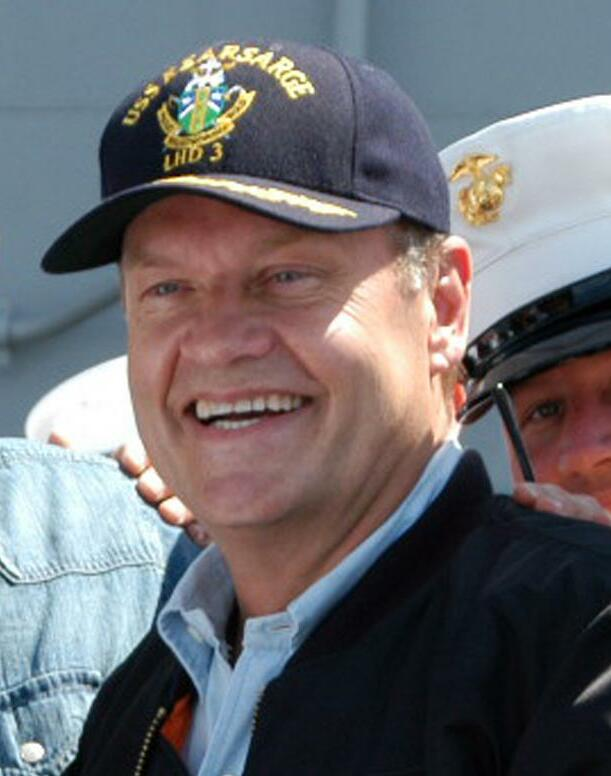
Kelsey Grammer voiced Sideshow Bob in the episode.

Sideshow Bob is a recurring character on The Simpsons. Since season three's "Black Widower" (1992), the writers have echoed the premise of Wile E. Coyote chasing the Road Runner from the 1949–1966 Looney Tunes cartoons by having Bob unexpectedly insert himself into Bart Simpson's life and attempt to kill him as revenge for the events of the season one episode "Krusty Gets Busted" (1990) and the numerous other times Bart foiled his plans. Executive producer Al Jean has compared Bob's character to that of Wile E. Coyote, noting that both are intelligent yet always foiled by what they perceive as an inferior intellect. The scene in which Bob is stomped on by multiple elephants and bounced right back up is a reference to Wile E. Coyote.

American actor Kelsey Grammer was brought in to guest star as Sideshow Bob for the third time. At that time, Grammer had become a household name as the lead of the television series Frasier, which was in production at the same time as this episode and would premiere on September 16, 1993. Grammer did not know the rake scene was extended because he had made the moan only once and was surprised when he saw the final product. The show's writers admire Grammer's singing voice and include a song for each appearance, including this episode. Alf Clausen, the primary composer for The Simpsons, commented that "[Grammer] is so great. He's just amazing. You can tell he has this love of musical theater, and he has the vocal instrument to go with it, so I know whatever I write is going to be sung the way I've heard it."

In Planet Simpson, author Chris Turner writes that Bob is built into a highbrow snob and conservative Republican, so the writers can continually hit him with a rake and bring him down. He represents high culture while Krusty, one of his archenemies, represents low culture, and Bart, stuck in between, always wins out. In the book Leaving Springfield, David L. G. Arnold comments that Bart is a product of a "mass-culture upbringing" and thus is Bob's enemy.

Bob's intelligence serves him in many ways. For example, during this episode, the parole board asks Bob why he has a tattoo that says "Die Bart, Die"; Bob replies that it is German for "The Bart, The". The board members are impressed and release him because "no one who speaks German could be an evil man" (an allusion to Adolf Hitler). However, his love of high culture is sometimes used against him. In this same episode, Bob agrees to perform the operetta H.M.S. Pinafore in its entirety as a last request for Bart. The tactic stalls Bob long enough for the police to arrest him.

Even though the episode aired during the beginning of the fifth season, it was produced by the fourth season's crew. A large part of the original crew left the show after season four. This led to the addition of several scenes that normally would not have been considered because the departing crew's mentality was, "what are they going to do, get us fired?" Although most of the episode was completed by the staff of season four, the end was rewritten by the team of season five.

Wallace Wolodarsky had seen the 1991 version of Cape Fear directed by Martin Scorsese, and pitched the idea of spoofing the film. Jon Vitti was then assigned to write a parody of the original Cape Fear film directed by J. Lee Thompson from 1962 as well as the Scorsese-directed remake (both films are based on the 1957 novel by John D. MacDonald, entitled The Executioners). Instead of using the spoof as only a part of the episode, which could have contained a B-story, the entire episode was devoted to this parody. Sideshow Bob was cast as the villain, and Bart became the main victim. The episode followed the same basic plot outline as the films and used elements from the original film's score by Bernard Herrmann (which was also used in the 1991 version). The theme was so popular that after this episode, it became Sideshow Bob's theme, usually played in the darkest Bob moments. This episode marked the first time a Sideshow Bob episode was not a mystery.

Difficulties were encountered with getting the episode to the minimum length, and many scenes were added in post-production. The episode starts with a repeat of a couch gag that was first used in the season four episode "Lisa's First Word" (1992), which is considerably longer than the typical couch gag. The crew added an Itchy & Scratchy cartoon, and a few red herrings as to who was trying to kill Bart. Even with all these additions, the episode still ran short of time. This led to creating the rake sequence, which became a memorable moment of the episode, and the entire series. Originally, Sideshow Bob was supposed to step on only one rake after he stepped out from the underside of the Simpson family's car, but this was changed to nine rakes in a row. According to executive producer Al Jean, the idea was to make the scene funny, then drag the joke out so that it is no longer funny, and then drag it out even longer to make it funny again.

Additions to the end musical number, including visual gags such as Bob appearing in uniform, were added after the animatics. The crew felt watching the character singing would not be interesting enough, and they had to include these gags to make it work. The Simpsons creator Matt Groening was surprised when he saw the additions because he originally thought they were silly and would not appear in the final cut, but he has grown to like them.

== Cultural references ==
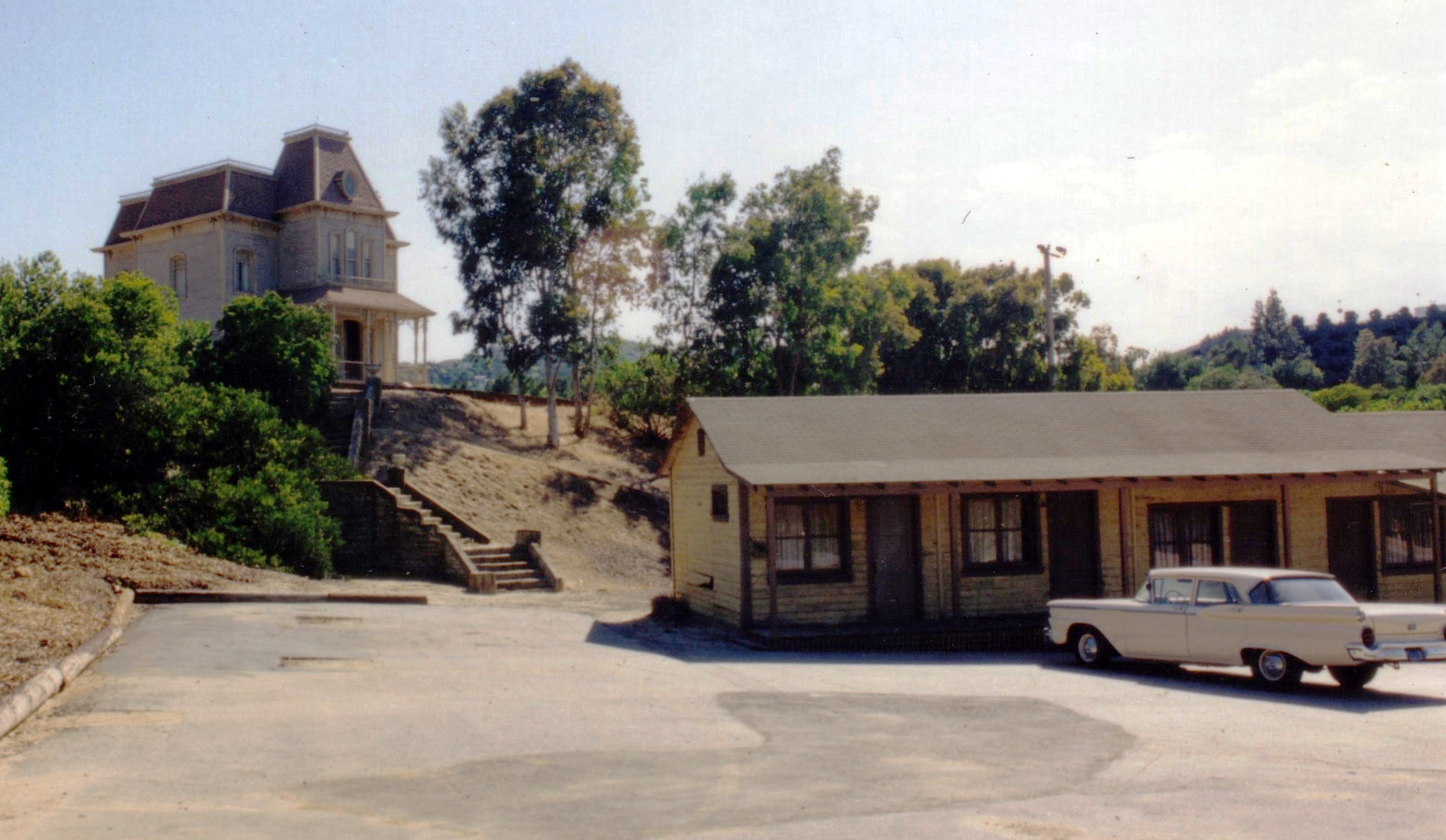
Bob stays at the Bates Motel from the 1960 film Psycho.

Besides borrowing the overall plot structure of the Cape Fear films, the episode made several direct references to specific scenes from the films. References to the original include: Marge's going to Chief Wiggum only to be told Sideshow Bob has not broken any laws (also references the 1991 remake). References to the 1991 remake include Sideshow Bob's tattoos; the shot of him leaving the prison gate; the scene with him smoking in the movie theater; part of his "workout" scene; his hiding under the Simpson family's car; Wiggum's rigging wire around the house to a toy doll as an alarm; his suggestion that Homer can do anything to someone who enters his home; Bob, strapped under a car, pulling up beside Bart for a conversation; and Homer's hiring a private investigator who attempts to persuade Bob to leave town.

The episode also contains elements of Alfred Hitchcock's Psycho (1960), with Sideshow Bob staying at the Bates Motel. When Bart receives death threats in the mail, he asks who'd want to kill him, as he's "This century's Dennis the Menace." The scene featuring Ned Flanders with his "finger razors" references the 1984 film A Nightmare on Elm Street and its villain Freddy Krueger (threatening Bart with the razors); also the 1990 film Edward Scissorhands (shaping the hedge into an angel, just as Edward had done a dinosaur). Homer's surprising Bart with his new hockey mask recalls the film Friday the 13th Part III and Sideshow Bob's tattoos on his knuckles are similar to those of Robert Mitchum's character in The Night of the Hunter. (Mitchum also played the villain Max Cady in the original 1962 version of Cape Fear.) Bob, composing his to-do list in the Bates motel, exclaims "Ah! Le mot juste!", the maxim of Gustave Flaubert. Before driving to Terror Lake, Lisa notes that the Witness Relocation Program included a recording of The F.B.I. Light Opera Society Sings the Complete Gilbert and Sullivan. While singing "Three Little Maids From School Are We" from The Mikado during the car trip to Terror Lake, Homer's and Bart's hats recall I Love Lucy. Bart asks Bob to sing the complete score of the H.M.S. Pinafore to stall for time.

== Reception and legacy ==
"Cape Feare" originally aired on the Fox network in the United States on October 7, 1993. It finished 32nd in the ratings for the week of October 4–10, 1993, with a Nielsen rating of 12.3. The episode was the highest-rated show on the Fox network that week.

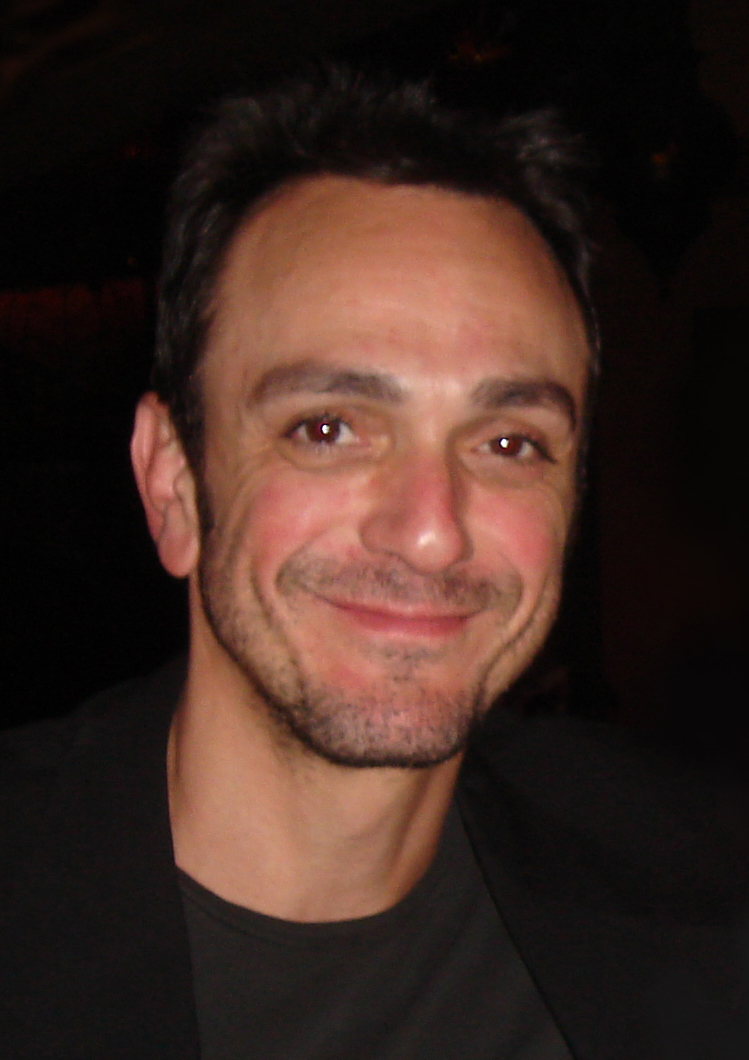
Cast member Hank Azaria considers "Cape Feare" his favorite episode.

Cape Feare is considered one of the darkest and one of the best episodes of The Simpsons. Scenes which changed the ultimate feel of the storyline involved Bob nearly killing Bart by cornering him along with tying up the rest of the family, along with the bloody tone at the beginning due to Bob sending Bart those letters. With these particular reasons, many consider this episode as one of the best in the show. According to Matt Groening, people often include this episode among their top 10 favorites. In Entertainment Weekly's top 25 The Simpsons episodes ever, it was placed third. To celebrate the show's 300th episode "Barting Over", USA Today published a top 10 chosen by the webmaster of The Simpsons Archive, which had this episode at a ninth place. In 2006, IGN named "Cape Feare" the best episode of the fifth season. Vanity Fair called it the show's fourth-best episode in 2007, as "this episode's masterful integration of filmic parody and a recurring character puts it near the top." James Walton of The Daily Telegraph characterized the episode as one of "The 10 Best Simpsons TV Episodes", while the Herald Sun placed it in their "The Simpsons Top 20". Karl Åkerström of the Swedish newspaper Borås Tidning called it his "all-time favorite" episode of the show. Michael Moran of The Times and Emily VanDerWerff of Slant Magazine both ranked "Cape Feare" as the fourth-best in the show's history. Cast member Hank Azaria cited this episode as his favorite in the series.

IGN's Robert Canning gave the episode a perfect score of 10 out of 10 and named it the best Sideshow Bob episode of The Simpsons. He added that there are "many, many reasons for its perfection, but what stands out most for me was how savage and single-minded Bob is in the episode. He wants to kill Bart and he makes no secret of it, save for lying to the parole board. Episodes since have made Bob far too wishy-washy. This was Bob in his prime—his vengeful, glorious, hilarious prime." Canning also placed it at #1 on the list of the Top 10 Sideshow Bob episodes. Nathan Rabin of The A.V. Club noted that the episode "turns limitations into strengths by spinning the need to fill out time into some of the series' sharpest, funniest and weirdest gags. The Rake Effect might be its greatest gift to comedy but its virtues go far beyond that. Sideshow Bob episodes consistently rank among the show's best and this represents the gold standard all subsequent Sideshow Bob episodes aspire to." Empire called Bob's mishaps while strapped under the Simpsons' car the eighth-best film parody in the show, and called the rake scene "the best bit of slapstick in Simpson history." The parody of Cape Fear was named the 33rd greatest film reference in the history of the show by Total Film's Nathan Ditum. The Norwegian newspaper Nettavisen listed Sideshow Bob's "Die Bart, die" tattoo from the episode as the fifth-best tattoo in film and television history. Entertainment.ie named it among the 10 greatest Simpsons episodes of all time. Screen Rant called it the best episode of the fifth season and the third greatest episode of The Simpsons. In 2019, Time ranked the episode ninth in its list of 10 best Simpsons episodes picked by Simpsons experts.

Anne Washburn's play Mr. Burns, a Post-Electric Play features a group of apocalypse survivors recounting the plot of the episode around a fire in its first act, the same survivors attempting to mount a play based on the episode in the second act, and the story having entered apocryphal legend decades later in the third act.

The "Treehouse of Horror XXXIV" segment "Ei8ht" begins with an alternate ending to this episode in which Bob successfully kills Bart, spurring Lisa to become a criminal psychologist.
