= Gregory Peck on screen, stage, and radio =

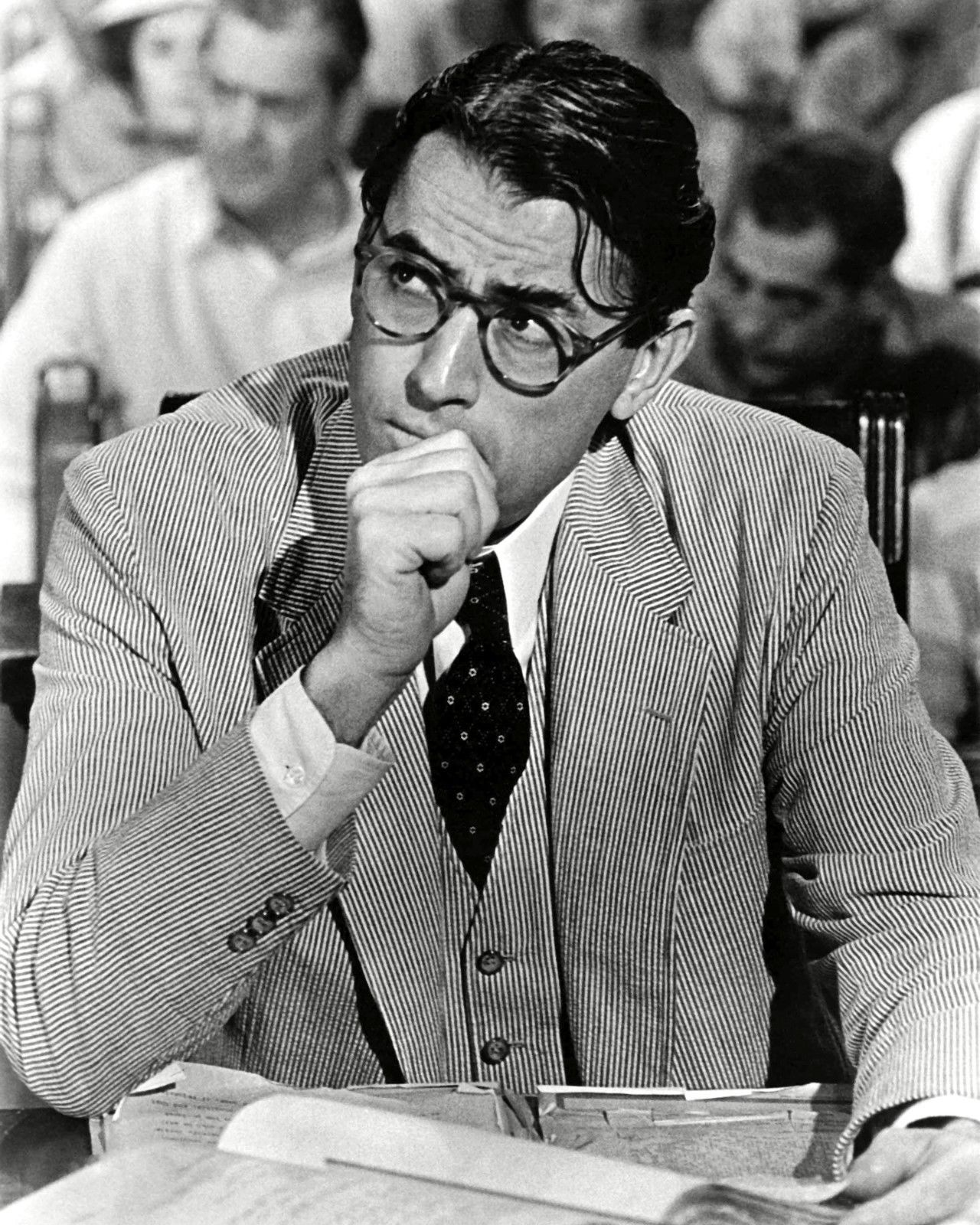
Peck as Atticus Finch in a publicity photo for To Kill a Mockingbird (1962)

Gregory Peck (1916–2003) was an American actor who had an extensive career in film, television, radio, and on stage. Peck's breakthrough role was as a Catholic priest who attempts to start a mission in China in the 1944 film The Keys of the Kingdom, for which he received his first nomination for the Academy Award for Best Actor. In the same year, he played Count Vronsky in a radio adaptation of Leo Tolstoy's Anna Karenina. He followed this by starring in Alfred Hitchcock's psychological thriller Spellbound (1945) with Ingrid Bergman. In the late 1940s, Peck received three more nominations for the Academy Award for Best Actor for his roles as a caring father in The Yearling (1946), a journalist who pretends to be Jewish to write an exposé on American antisemitism in Gentleman's Agreement (1947), and a brave airman in Twelve O'Clock High (1949).

Peck co-founded the theatre company La Jolla Playhouse in 1947 with Dorothy McGuire and Mel Ferrer. He starred in productions of Angel Street and The Male Animal for the company. In 1951, he played Royal Navy officer Horatio Hornblower in the eponymous film, David in the biblical epic David and Bathsheba with Susan Hayward, and a soldier in the western Only the Valiant with Barbara Payton. Two years later, Peck appeared as a journalist who falls in love with a princess in the romantic comedy Roman Holiday (1953) with Audrey Hepburn. During the late 1950s, he portrayed Captain Ahab in Moby Dick (1956), war hero Joseph G. Clemons in Pork Chop Hill (1959), and writer F. Scott Fitzgerald in Beloved Infidel (1959).

He won the Academy Award for Best Actor for his performance as Atticus Finch, a lawyer attempting to exonerate a black man wrongly accused of rape in courtroom drama To Kill a Mockingbird (1962). The role topped the AFI's 50 Greatest Screen Heroes. Seven years later, he appeared in the title role of the western Mackenna's Gold, and as a spy in The Chairman. In the late 1970s, Peck played General Douglas MacArthur in the eponymous 1977 film and Nazi doctor Josef Mengele in The Boys from Brazil (1978).

Peck made his television debut in 1982 by appearing as President Abraham Lincoln in the miniseries The Blue and the Gray. He followed this with the television film The Scarlet and the Black where he portrayed Catholic priest Hugh O'Flaherty who helped Jews and prisoners of war to hide in World War II-era Rome. For his appearance as Father Mapple in the 1998 miniseries Moby Dick, he received the Golden Globe Award for Best Supporting Actor – Series, Miniseries or Television Film and a nomination for a Primetime Emmy.

== Film ==
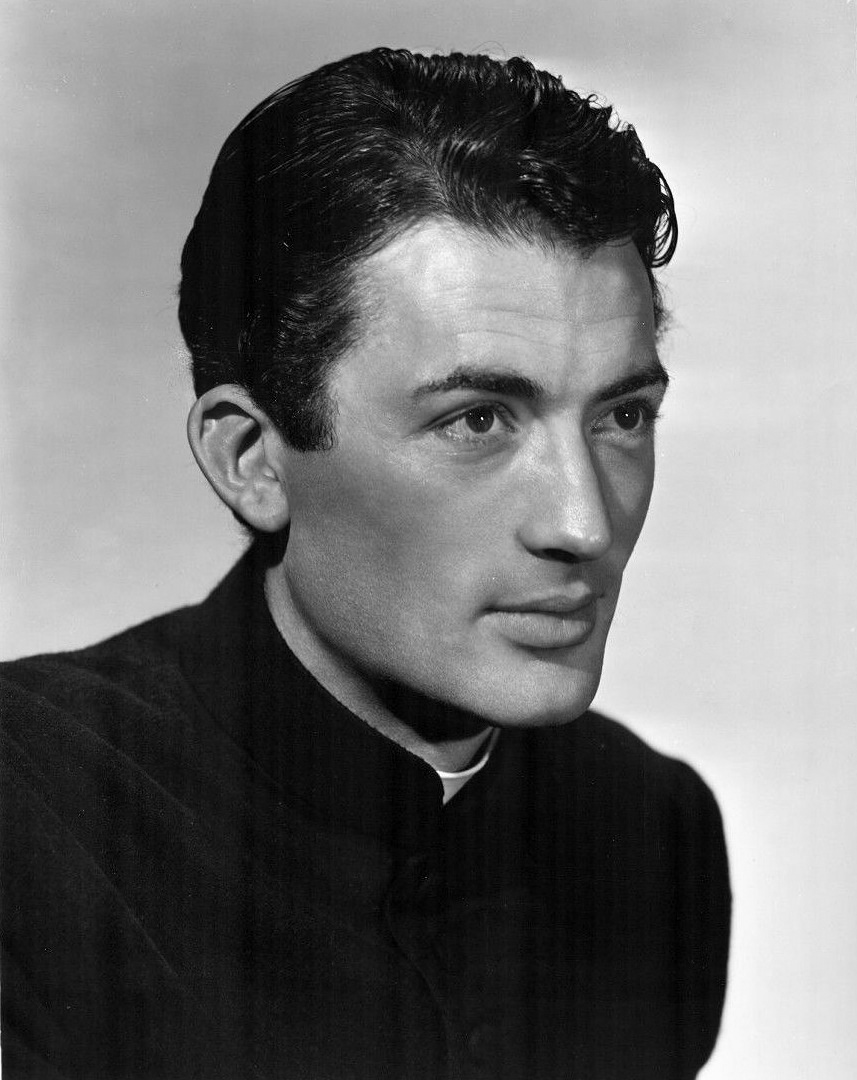
In The Keys of the Kingdom (1944)

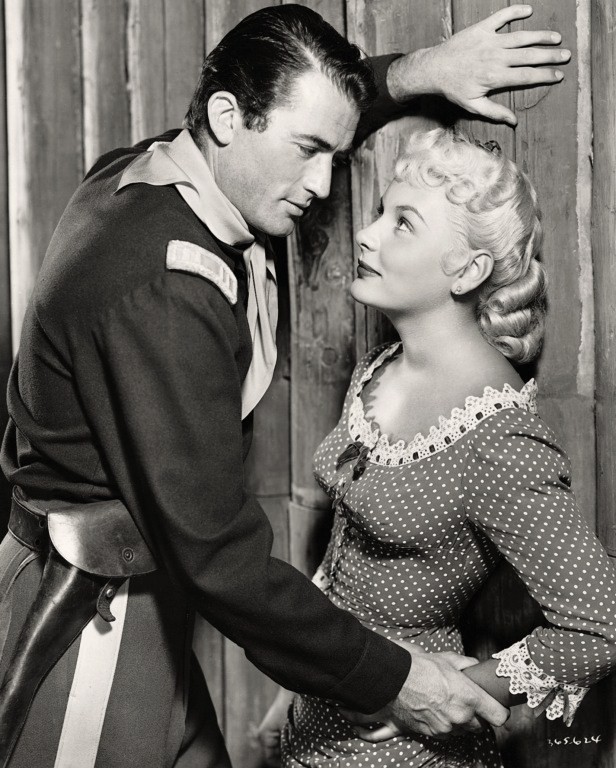
With Barbara Payton in Only the Valiant (1951)

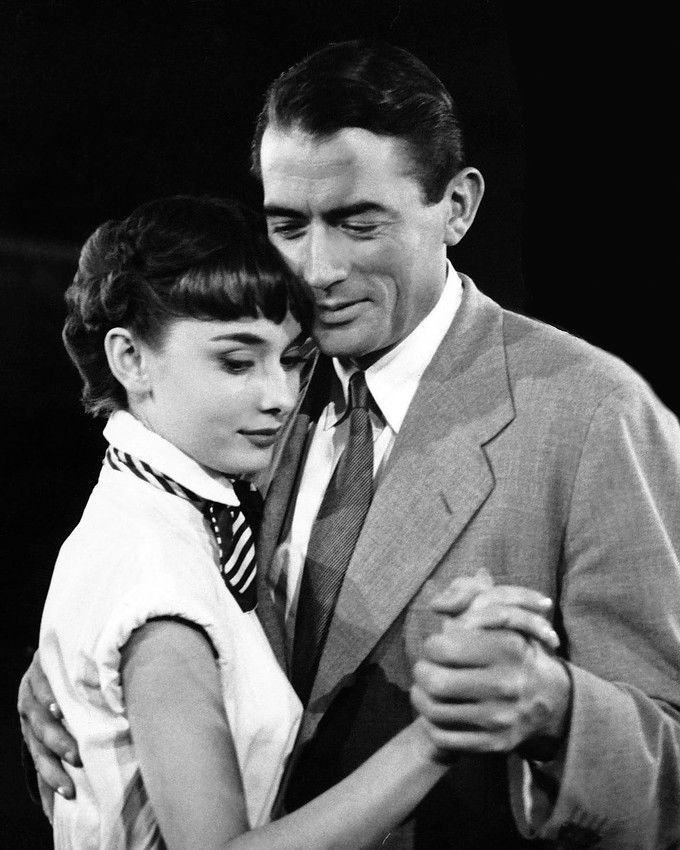
With Audrey Hepburn in Roman Holiday (1953)

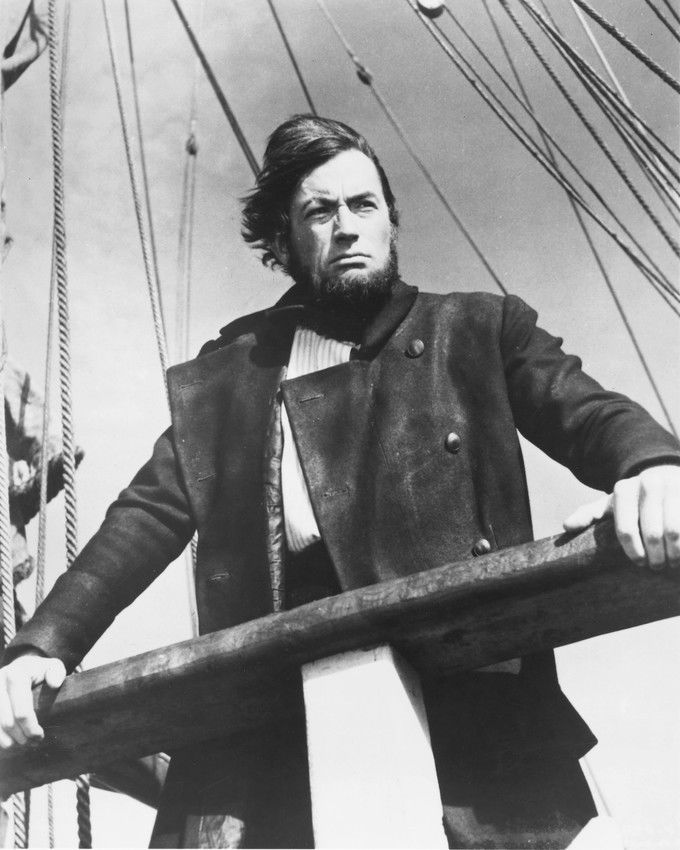
Captain Ahab in Moby Dick (1956)

Year	Title	Role(s)	Notes	Ref(s)
1944	Days of Glory	Vladimir		
1944	The Keys of the Kingdom	Father Francis Chisholm	Academy Award for Best Actor (Nomination)	
1945	The Valley of Decision	Paul Scott		
1945	Spellbound	Dr. Anthony Edwardes / John Ballantyne		
1946	The Yearling	"Penny" Baxter	Academy Award for Best Actor (Nomination)	
1946	Duel in the Sun	Lewt McCanles		
1947	The Macomber Affair	Robert Wilson		
1947	Gentleman's Agreement	Philip Schuyler Green	Academy Award for Best Actor (Nomination)	
1947	The Paradine Case	Anthony Keane		
1948	Yellow Sky	James "Stretch" Dawson		
1949	The Great Sinner	Fedya		
1949	Twelve O'Clock High	Brigadier General Frank Savage	Academy Award for Best Actor (Nomination)	
1950	The Gunfighter	Jimmy Ringo		
1951	Captain Horatio Hornblower	Captain Horatio Hornblower		
1951	Only the Valiant	Captain Richard Lance		
1951	David and Bathsheba	David		
1951	Pictura: An Adventure in Art	Narrator	Documentary; anthology film, segment: "Legend of Saint Ursula"	
1952	The World in His Arms	Jonathan Clark		
1952	The Snows of Kilimanjaro	Harry Street		
1953	Roman Holiday	Joe Bradley		
1953	Boum sur Paris	Himself	French film	
1954	The Million Pound Note	Henry Adams		
1954	Night People	Colonel Steve Van Dyke		
1954	The Purple Plain	Squadron Leader Bill Forrester		
1956	The Man in the Gray Flannel Suit	Tom Rath		
1956	Moby Dick	Captain Ahab		
1957	Designing Woman	Mike Hagen		
1958	The Hidden World	Narrator	Documentary	
1958	The Bravados	Jim Douglas		
1958	The Big Country	James McKay	Also producer	
1959	Pork Chop Hill	Lieutenant Joe Clemons	Also executive producer	
1959	Beloved Infidel	F. Scott Fitzgerald		
1959	On the Beach	Dwight Towers		
1961	The Guns of Navarone	Captain Keith Mallory		
1962	Cape Fear	Sam Bowden	Also executive producer	
1962	How the West Was Won	Cleve Van Valen		
1962	To Kill a Mockingbird	Atticus Finch	Also executive producer Academy Award for Best Actor (Won)	
1963	Captain Newman, M.D.	Capt. Josiah J. Newman	Also executive producer	
1964	Behold a Pale Horse	Manuel Artiguez	Also executive producer	
1964	John F. Kennedy: Years of Lightning, Day of Drums	Narrator	Documentary	
1965	Mirage	David Stillwell		
1966	Arabesque	David Pollock		
1968	The Stalking Moon	Sam Varner		
1969	Mackenna's Gold	Mackenna		
1969	The Chairman	John Hathaway		
1969	Marooned	Charles Keith		
1970	I Walk the Line	Sheriff Henry Tawes		
1971	Shoot Out	Clay Lomax		
1972	The Trial of the Catonsville Nine	—	Producer	
1974	Billy Two Hats	Arch Deans		
1974	The Dove	—	Producer	
1976	The Omen	Robert Thorn		
1977	MacArthur	General Douglas MacArthur		
1978	The Boys from Brazil	Josef Mengele		
1980	The Sea Wolves	Colonel Lewis Pugh		
1987	Amazing Grace and Chuck	President		
1989	Old Gringo	Ambrose Bierce		
1989	Super Chief: The Life and Legacy of Earl Warren	Narrator	Documentary	
1991	Other People's Money	Andrew "Jorgy" Jorgenson		
1991	Cape Fear	Lee Heller		
1994	The Hunt for Adolf Eichmann	Narrator	Documentary	
1995	Wild Bill: Hollywood Maverick	Himself	Documentary	
1999	The Art of Norton Simon	Narrator	Documentary short film	
2000	A Conversation with Gregory Peck	Himself	Documentary	
2024	The First Omen	Robert Thorn	Archival footage	

== Television ==
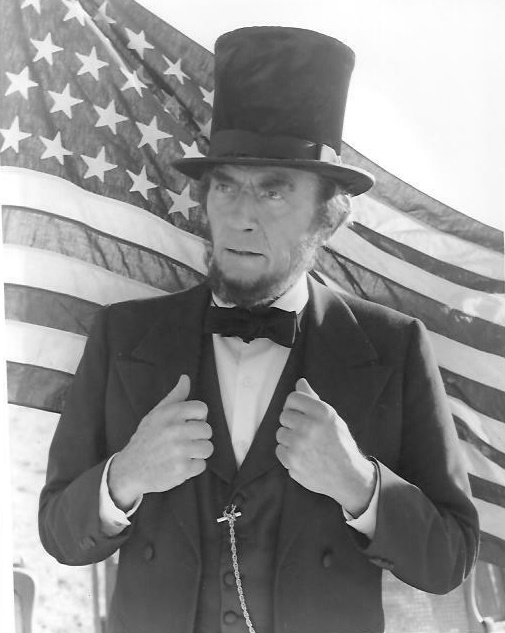
Peck as Abraham Lincoln in a still from the television miniseries The Blue and the Gray (1982)

Year(s)	Title	Role(s)	Notes	Ref(s)
1982	The Blue and the Gray	Abraham Lincoln	Television miniseries	
1983	The Scarlet and the Black	Monsignor Hugh O'Flaherty	Television film	
1985	57th Academy Awards	—	Producer	
1990	Sanford Meisner: The American Theatre's Best Kept Secret	Himself	Documentary	
1991	Frederic Remington: The Truth of Other Days	Narrator	Documentary	
1993	The Portrait	Gardner Church	Television film; also executive producer	
1994	Baseball	Kid Gleason and Connie Mack	Voice, Documentary miniseries	
1998	Moby Dick	Father Mapple	Television miniseries	
1999	American Prophet: The Story of Joseph Smith	Narrator	Documentary	

== Stage ==
Year(s)	Title	Role	Theatre	Notes	Ref.
1942	The Morning Star	Cliff Parrilow	Morosco Theatre	September 14 – October 3	
1942–1943	The Willow and I	Kirkland Todd and Robin Todd	Windsor Theatre	December 10, 1942 – January 2, 1943	
1943	Sons and Soldiers	Andrew Tadlock	Morosco Theatre	May 4–22	
1947	Angel Street	Mr. Manningham	La Jolla Playhouse	August 26–31	
1948	The Male Animal	Tommy Turner	La Jolla Playhouse	August 24–28	
1949	Light Up the Sky	Unknown	La Jolla Playhouse	July 26–31	
1991–1993	The Will Rogers Follies	Mr. Ziegfeld (voice)	Palace Theatre	May 1, 1991 – September 5, 1993	

== Radio ==
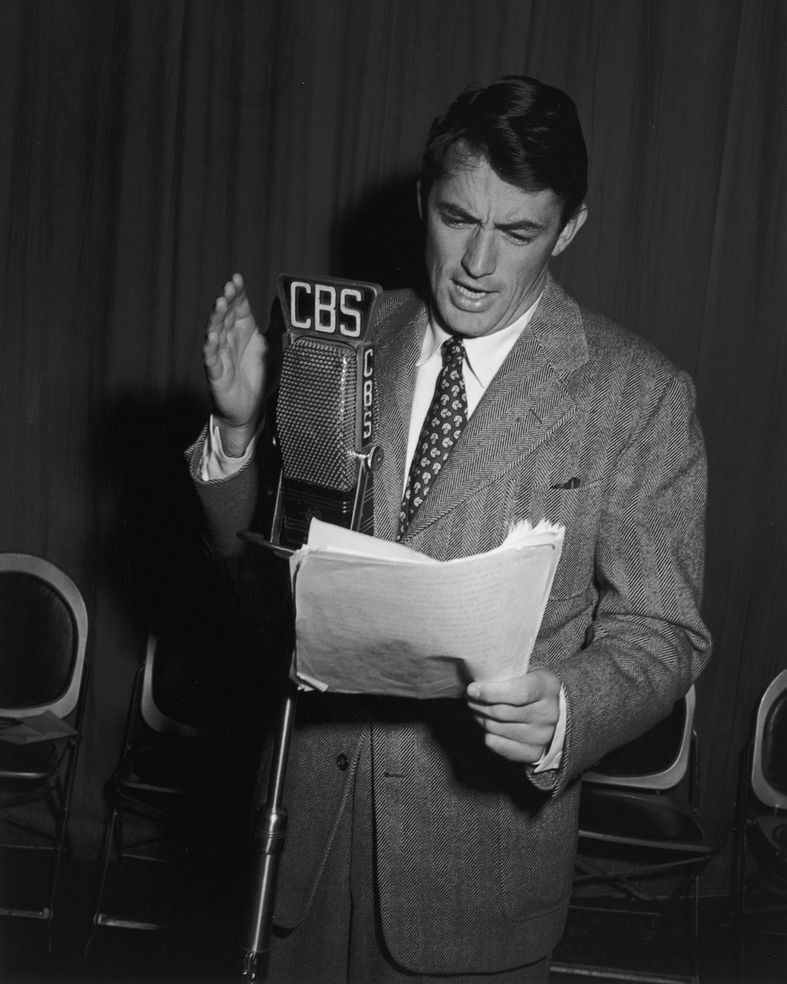
Publicity photograph for CBS Radio

Year(s)	Title	Role	Notes	Ref(s)
1944	That They Might Live	Dick		
1944	Screen Guild Players	Count Vronsky	Episode: "Anna Karenina"	
1945	This Is My Best	Unknown	Episode: "Jupiter Laughs"	
1945	Screen Guild Players	Thomas Armstrong	Episode: "Romance"	
1945	The Doctor Fights	Dr. Harry Joseph	Episode: "Medicine for the Enemy"	
1946	Theatre of Romance	Holger Brandt	Episode: "Intermezzo"	
1946	Lux Radio Theatre	Paul Scott	Episode: "Valley of Decision"	
1946	Lux Radio Theatre	Jerry Durance	Episode: "Now, Voyager"	
1946	Cavalcade of America	George Washington	Episode: "Young Major Washington"	
1946	Suspense	Steve Gare	Episode: "The Lonely Road"	
1946	Hollywood Players	Sullivan	Episode: "Sullivan's Travels"	
1946	Hollywood Players	Unknown	Episode: "No Time for Comedy"	
1946	Hollywood Players	Gregory	Episode: "All Through the House"	
1947	Screen Guild Players	Pa Baxter	Episode: "The Yearling"	
1947	Cavalcade for America	Jim Davenport	Episode: "School for Men"	
1948	Duffy's Tavern	Himself		
1948	Suspense	Ridge Fowler	Episode: "Hitchhiker Poker"	
1949	Suspense	Jeffrey Bruno	Episode: "Murder Through the Looking Glass"	
1949	Screen Directors Playhouse	James "Stretch" Dawson	Episode: "Yellow Sky"	
1949	Suspense	Ben	Episode: "Nightmare"	
1949	The Hotpoint Holiday Hour	Burt Jefferson	Episode: "The Man Who Came To Dinner"	
1951	Screen Directors Playhouse	Jimmy Ringo	Episode: "The Gunfighter"	
1951	Suspense	Mr. MacIntyre	Episode: "The Truth About Jerry Baxter"	
1952	Cavalcade of America	Unknown	Episode: "A Prisoner Named Brown"	
1952	Lux Radio Theatre	Captain Horatio Hornblower	Episode: "Captain Horatio Hornblower"	
1952	Stars in the Air	Pa Baxter	Episode: "The Yearling"	

== Bibliography ==
- Biltereyst, Daniel; Maltby, Richard; Meers, Philippe (February 5, 2019). The Routledge Companion to New Cinema History. Taylor & Francis. ISBN 978-1-317-35395-9.
- Haney, Lynn (March 24, 2005). Gregory Peck: A Charmed Life. Pavilion Books. ISBN 978-1-86105-824-9.
- Molyneaux, Gerard (1995). Gregory Peck: A Bio-bibliography. Greenwood Publishing Group. ISBN 978-0-313-28668-1.
