= Cape Fear (TV series) =

American psychological thriller television miniseries

- Genre: Psychological thriller
- Created by: Nick Antosca
- Based on: The Executioners by John D. MacDonald; Cape Fear by Wesley Strick; Cape Fear by James R. Webb
- Starring: Javier Bardem; Amy Adams; Patrick Wilson; Joe Anders; Lily Collias; CCH Pounder; Malia Pyles
- Music by: Jeff Russo
- Country of origin: United States
- Original language: English
- No. of episodes: 10

Production
- Executive producers: Martin Scorsese; Steven Spielberg; Nick Antosca; Darryl Frank; Justin Falvey; Alex Hedlund; Richard Heus; Amy Adams; Javier Bardem; Amanda Marsalis; Morten Tyldum
- Producers: Brette Billow; David Kirschner; Greg O'Bryant
- Cinematography: Eben Bolter; Celiana Cárdenas
- Editors: Greg O'Bryant; Darrin Navarro; Susan E. Kim; David Holland; Steph Zenee Perez
- Running time: 46–57 minutes
- Production companies: Sikelia Productions; Amblin Television; Eat the Cat; Universal Content Productions

Original release
- Network: Apple TV
- Release: June 5 – July 31, 2026

Cape Fear is an American psychological thriller television miniseries created by Nick Antosca, based on the novel The Executioners by John D. MacDonald and its film adaptations in 1962 and 1991. It stars an ensemble cast led by Javier Bardem, Amy Adams, and Patrick Wilson. It premiered on Apple TV on June 5, 2026 and received generally positive reviews.

== Premise ==
Max Cady, a vicious and unreformed ex-convict, is released from prison and sets about taking revenge on Anna Bowden, the lawyer who represented him 17 years earlier in court.

== Cast ==
=== Main ===
- Javier Bardem as Max Cady, a sociopathic ex-convict released after serving seventeen years for the murder of his pregnant wife
- Amy Adams as Anna Bowden, a senior attorney at the Savannah Justice League Project (SJLP) and Tom's wife
- Patrick Wilson as Tom Bowden, a former prosecutor, high-priced attorney, and Anna's husband
- Joe Anders as Zack Bowden, Anna and Tom's troubled son and Natalie's younger half-brother
- Lily Collias as Natalie Bowden, Anna's daughter, Tom's stepdaughter, and Zack's older half-sister
- CCH Pounder as Noa Toussaint, Anna's colleague and director of SJLP
- Malia Pyles as Nevaeh Valentine, a mysterious young woman who targets both Zack and Natalie

=== Recurring ===
- Jamie Hector as Ray Rawlins, an ex-con turned private investigator employed by SJLP
- Anna Baryshnikov as Tabitha, a journalist for the fictional Savannah Times doing a story on Anna
- Dot Cloud as Callie, a friend of Natalie
- Eric Mendenhall as Louis Pilgrim, a true crime podcaster
- Paul Schneider as Grayson Park, a detective
- Miles Mussenden as Ned Carson, a detective
- Margarita Levieva as Lexi, Tom's colleague
- Ron Perlman as Robert Cady, Max's father
- Juliette Lewis as Crystal Cady, Max's mentally unstable half-sister who is stalking Max. Lewis also starred in the 1991 adaptation.

=== Guest ===
- Geneva Carr as a legal commentator reporting on Cady's release
- Jullian Dulce Vida as Byron French, a wrongfully convicted inmate represented by SJLP
- Lynn Wanlass as Bunny French, Byron's mother
- Kathleen Scott Paul as Amy Brancato, Cady's deceased mistress who takes responsibility for his crime
- Felisha Terrell as Mara Rawlins, Ray's wife
- Paul Calderón as the Padrino, the leader of a prison gang
- Wesley Strick as an ER doctor treating Zack. Strick also wrote the 1991 adaptation.
- Roberto Sanchez as Ruben Ramirez, an inmate represented by SJLP
- Jay Huguley as Paul, Anna's ex-fiancée and Natalie's biological father
- Ted Levine as Brandon Deveraux, Anna's estranged father and Tom's father-in-law
- Ethan Embry as Ollie
- Wynn Everett as Catherine Buckley, Tom and Lexi's client
- Sunny Mabrey as Trish
- Francesca Scorsese as Reese, an influencer
- Mike Pniewski as Ed Coburn, the owner of Tarwater, the private prison where Max was incarcerated
- Judd Lormand as Dave, a car salesman with a grudge against Cady
- Claire Bronson as Beth, Sophia's mother
- Peter Macon as Warren "Smiley" Pitt, a witness that could exonerate Ramirez
- Martha Millan as Faith Valentine, Nevaeh's mother
- Clayton Farris as Henry Weitz
- Patrick Fischler as Dr. Lee
- Max Mattern as Luke
- Teresa L. Graves as Val Tierny
- Jill Larson as Hester Cady, Max's stepmother

== Episodes ==
No.	Title	Directed by	Written by	Original release date
1	"Fingers & Toes"	Morten Tyldum	Nick Antosca	June 5, 2026
Anna Bowden is a defense attorney in Savannah, Georgia and co-director of the Savannah Justice League Project, a nonprofit organization dedicated to freeing wrongfully convicted inmates. While celebrating the release of her latest client, Byron French, Anna and her husband Tom are informed that Max Cady has been released; seventeen years earlier, in 2008, Anna defended Max at trial for brutally stabbing his pregnant wife to death and convinced him to take a plea deal proposed by Tom, the prosecutor. Max was given a life sentence, but new evidence recovered following the suicide of his old mistress seemingly proved that she, not Max, committed the murder. Byron is found dead next to the corpse of his ailing mother. Anna hosts a fundraiser to boost SJLP's sagging finances, at which Max makes his public debut. Claiming to represent those wronged by "the injustice system", he attains instant fame and soon attracts an offer from Anna's colleague Noa to help publicize their work. Tom and Anna learn that their son Zack, who is struggling with anxiety after being suspended from school, has disappeared.
2	"Why Would I Want to Hurt You?"	SJ Clarkson	André Jacquemetton & Maria Jacquemetton	June 5, 2026
Zack returns home bloodied, under the influence, and with a toe severed from his foot. Max surprises the Bowdens at home and makes subtle threats, implying that he kidnapped and tortured Zack as a form of revenge. Natalie finds clues that Max broke into their house; this is enough for Anna to send an anonymous tip to the police. Max resists arrest and is taken to the same hospital where Zack is being treated. The severed toe is found after he vomits the contents of his stomach; the attending doctor notes that Zack could have simply bitten his own toe off in a drugged state, which combined with Max's attendance at the fundraiser gives him a solid alibi for the alleged kidnapping. Taking up SJLP's offer to help advocate for inmates, Max gives an interview where he reveals his troubled childhood and admits that, in his mind, he sees hallucinations of his dead wife and unborn son due to neurological damage he sustained from a prison fight. Tom has a run in with his unpleasant father-in-law, Brandon. While touring a house he plans to buy, Max sits and once again sees his family watching him.
3	"Phantom Sensations"	Amanda Marsalis	Alan Page Arriaga	June 12, 2026
Max files a lawsuit against Ed Coburn, owner of the prison where he served his sentence, for $1.1 million. At Noa's request, Anna agrees to represent Max and uses the threat of media attention to have the suit settled for $4.2 million. Over coffee at their motel, Max pointedly asks Anna why she turned on him in his original trial; Anna admits regret for mishandling his defense but insists that she did all she could. Footage of Natalie doing yoga is secretly recorded and posted on her social media feed; at a party, she is humiliated when the video goes public and finds solace in Amber, a young woman who offers her MDMA, with Amber asking Natalie to "roll with me." Unbeknownst to Natalie, "Amber" is actually a grifter named Neveah, who had previously manipulated Zack until Anna tracked her down and forced her to cease contact with him. Tom has a meeting with his colleague Lexi, during which they kiss, unaware that Zack is watching. Returning home, Max finds and plays a videotape recorded by a female stranger he recognizes as having followed him earlier, triggering a violent reaction.
4	"Pierced"	Reed Morano	Tara Shivkumar	June 19, 2026
5	"Faith"	Steven Piet	Peter Blake	June 26, 2026
6	"Possum"	Trey Edward Shults	Brian Evenson	July 3, 2026
7	"Mongrel"	Jon S. Baird	Teleplay by : André Jacquemetton & Maria Jacquemetton; Story by : André Jacquemetton & Maria Jacquemetton & Greg Goetz	July 10, 2026
8	"Los tiempos de Dios son Perfectos"	Stephen Williams	Alan Page Arriaga	July 17, 2026
9	"The Scar"	Amanda Marsalis	Diana Pawell & Peter Blake	July 24, 2026
10	"The Executioners"	Jonathan Van Tulleken	Nick Antosca & Peter Blake & Tara Shivkumar	July 31, 2026

== Production ==
Nick Antosca was a fan of both Cape Fear movies since childhood, and he asked Universal to develop an adaptation of them. He began development of the series through his deal with Universal Content Productions along with Amblin Television. It is produced by Eat the Cat, Universal Content Productions, and Amblin Television. Development of the show was first announced in November 2023 as the project sought buyers. In April 2024, it was revealed the series was in development at Apple TV+. The series would receive a greenlight in November, with Javier Bardem cast in the lead role of Max Cady. In February 2025, Amy Adams and Patrick Wilson joined the starring cast. In April 2025, it was revealed that CCH Pounder joined the main cast, with Morten Tyldum now onboard to executive produce and direct the pilot. In May 2025, Anna Baryshnikov, Jamie Hector, Clara Wong, Lily Collias, Joe Anders and Malia Pyles joined the cast. Ron Perlman, Ted Levine, Jason Scott Morgan and Margarita Levieva were added to the cast in September 2025, with Levieva replacing Wong in her role. In October 2025, Patrick Fischler was cast in a recurring role.

Filming began in Atlanta on April 30, 2025 and wrapped on October 15, 2025.

== Release ==
The series was released on Apple TV on June 5, 2026, with the first two episodes available immediately and the rest debuting on a weekly basis until July 31.

== Reception ==
On the review aggregator website Rotten Tomatoes, the series holds an approval rating of 75%, based on 76 reviews, with an average of rated reviews of 7.1/10. The website's critics consensus reads, "Elevated by Javier Bardem's manic charisma and the genre's best pulpy intricacies, Cape Fear revitalizes the revenge thriller and manages to make a noteworthy name for itself." Metacritic, which uses a weighted average, assigned a score of 68 out of 100 based on 30 critics, indicating "generally favorable" reviews.
