= The Black Sea (film) =

2024 drama film

- Theatrical release poster
- Directed by: Crystal Moselle; Derrick B. Harden
- Produced by: Crystal Moselle; Izabella Tzenkova
- Starring: Derrick B. Harden; Irmena Chichikova; Samuel Finzi; Stoyo Mirkov
- Cinematography: Jackson Hunt
- Edited by: Anastas Petkov
- Music by: Charles Moselle
- Production companies: Give Thanks; Kotva Films
- Distributed by: Metrograph Pictures
- Release dates: March 9, 2024 (SXSW); November 22, 2024 (United States)
- Running time: 96 minutes
- Countries: United States; Bulgaria
- Languages: English; Bulgarian
- Box office: $25,179

The Black Sea is a 2024 comedy-drama film, directed by Crystal Moselle and Derrick B. Harden. It stars Derrick B. Harden, Irmena Chichikova, Samuel Finzi and Stoyo Mirkov.

It had its world premiere at South by Southwest on March 9, 2024, and was released in the United States on November 22, 2024, by Metrograph Pictures.

== Premise ==
A man makes unexpected connections in a small town, as he finds himself to be the only black person around.

== Cast ==
- Derrick B. Harden as Khalid
- Irmena Chichikova as Ina
- Samuel Finzi as Boris
- Stoyo Mirkov as Georgi

== Production ==
Production on the film lasted 16 days, with no script and everything being improvised.

== Release ==
It had its world premiere at South by Southwest on March 9, 2024. In May 2024, Metrograph Pictures acquired U.S. distribution rights to the film. It was released in the United States on November 22, 2024.

== Reception ==
=== Critical reception ===
On the review aggregator website Rotten Tomatoes, 92% of 24 critics' reviews are positive. Metacritic, which uses a weighted average, assigned the film a score of 56 out of 100, based on 4 critics, indicating "mixed or average" reviews.

Jen Chaney of Vulture praised the film writing: "If Harden weren’t such a naturally magnetic presence, The Black Sea would not work nearly as effectively as it does. But he’s fascinating and unpredictable to observe, carrying the entire film on his shoulders as if it weighs nothing at all." Brandon Yu of The New York Times also praised the film writing: "Moselle and Harden work with a subtle naturalistic touch that makes for a quietly sweet movie about unlikely redemption."

Conversely, Simon Abrams of RogerEbert.com gave the film 1.5 out of 4 stars, writing: "A tepid situation comedy in indie drama drag, "The Black Sea" lacks a sense of urgency."
