= Gazer (film) =

- Theatrical release poster
- Directed by: Ryan J. Sloan
- Written by: Ariella Mastroianni; Ryan J. Sloan
- Produced by: Mason Dwinell; Ariella Mastroianni; Ryan J. Sloan
- Starring: Ariella Mastroianni; Marcia Debonis; Renee Gagner; Jack Alberts; Tommy Kang
- Cinematography: Matheus Bastos
- Edited by: Ryan J. Sloan; Jordan Toussaint
- Music by: Steve Matthew Carter
- Production company: Telstar Films
- Distributed by: Metrograph Pictures
- Release dates: May 22, 2024 (Cannes); April 4, 2025 (United States)
- Running time: 114 minutes
- Country: United States
- Language: English
- Budget: $80,000
- Box office: $38,156

Gazer is a 2024 American psychological mystery thriller film directed, written, produced, and edited by Ryan J. Sloan, in his feature directorial debut. The film's story follows Frankie Rhodes, a young mother with dyschronometria who struggles to perceive time. Using cassette tapes for guidance, she takes a risky job from a mysterious woman to support her family, unaware of the dark consequences that await.

The film premiered at the Cannes Film Festival on May 22, 2024, and was released in the United States on April 4, 2025.

== Synopsis ==
At the start of the movie, Rhodes loses her job as a gas station attendant in New Jersey, when she is distracted from helping fill gas by a violent encounter in a neighboring apartment. A woman in the encounter later attends a survivors meeting with Rhodes, and offers her $3000 to "move a car." Rhodes goes to the apartment and drives the car to the specified location in the Meadowlands, only to hear bumping in the trunk. Rhodes cannot remember what happens next, but hours later, the trunk is empty, with a bedsheet hanging out.

In a flashback, Rhodes and her husband talk about the stresses in their marriage. At the end of the conversation, the husband reveals a cut in his stomach.

Rhodes follows Paige to a newspaper manufacturing facility, where her brother Henry has her tied to a pole. The brother tells Paige he is going to jail and threatens to hit her, then drops the weapon and walks away. Rhodes unties Paige and knocks the brother unconscious. As Rhodes checks on Henry and asks to call an ambulance, Henry whispers to Rhodes to kill Paige. Paige knocks Rhodes unconscious, and some time passes.

Rhodes is arrested and the police present photos of the dead Paige. They assert that Rhodes's fingerprints are found in Paige's car.

== Cast ==
- Ariella Mastroianni as Frankie Rhodes, a young mother with dyschronometria
- Marcia DeBonis as Brenda
- Renee Gagner as Claire Reznik
- Jack Alberts as Henry Foster
- Tommy Kang as Detective Gale Chong

== Release ==
=== Premiere ===
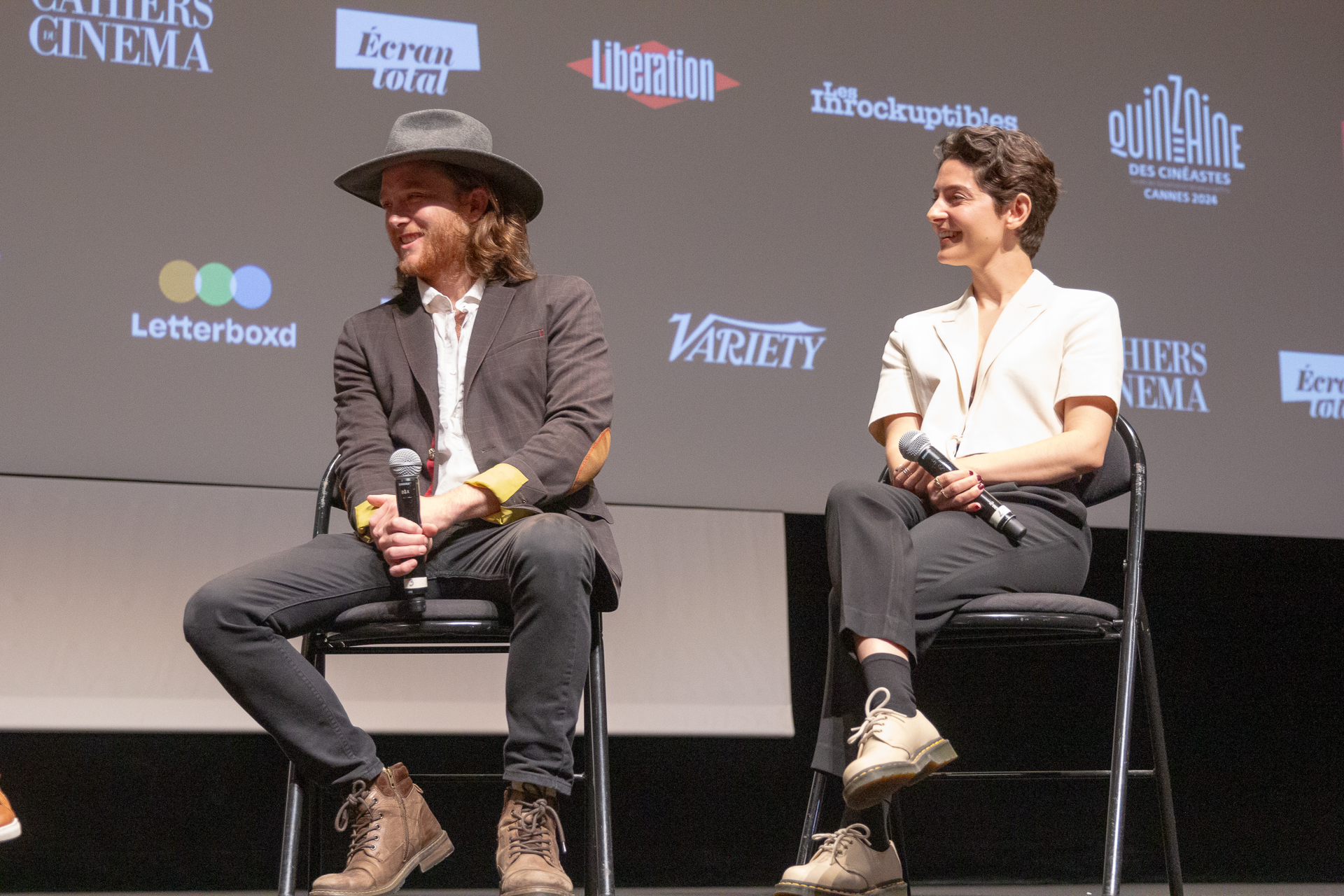
Director Ryan J. Sloan and leading actress Ariella Mastroianni at Cannes on May 22, 2024

Gazer had its world premiere at the Cannes Film Festival on May 22, 2024. The film also premiered at the Sitges Film Festival on October 8, the Hamptons International Film Festival on October 11, the Woodstock Film Festival on October 17, the Brooklyn Horror Film Festival on October 22, the Montclair Film Festival on October 26, and the QCinema International Film Festival on November 10. The film was originally set to be released in the United States on February 21, 2025, but was delayed to April 4, 2025. The film was also released in France on April 23, 2025. The film was released in cinemas in the United Kingdom on July 25, 2025.

=== Distribution ===
On May 2, 2024, Memento International acquired the international sales rights to the film. On May 19, 2024, UFO Distribution acquired the French distribution rights to the film. On May 29, 2024, six days after the Cannes premiere, Metrograph Pictures acquired the North American distribution rights to the film. On January 28, 2025, Memento International signed distribution deals for Rialto Distribution in Australia and New Zealand, Gulf Film for the Middle East, AV-Jet International for Taiwan, PT Falcon for Indonesia, Feather Stone for Vietnam, Skeye for airlines, Bulldog Film Distribution for the UK and Ireland, and Cinefil for Hungary.

== Reception ==
On the review aggregator website Rotten Tomatoes, 81% of 53 critics' reviews are positive. The website's consensus reads: "Hypnotic and stylish if a little too indulgent in its pacing, Gazer is an intriguing mood piece featuring a terrific performance by Ariella Mastroianni." Metacritic, which uses a weighted average, assigned the film a score of 71 out of 100, based on 17 critics, indicating "generally favorable" reviews. Writing for The Hollywood Reporter, Angie Han stated "A visually arresting, if emotionally detached, debut." Catherine Bray of Variety wrote "Though it unfortunately lacks the narrative momentum of top-tier gumshoe pics, it’s no hardship spending time with Frankie, thanks to a neatly judged performance from Mastroianni."
