= Lily Collias =

American actress

- Born: 2004 or 2005 (age 21–22)
- Education: Lee Strasberg Theatre and Film Institute
- Occupation: Actress

Lily Collias (/ˈkoʊliəs/) is an American actress best known for her performance as Sam in the 2024 film Good One.

== Early life and education ==
Collias was born in 2004 or 2005 in West Los Angeles to a Greek father and French mother, and, as a child, spent her summers in her grandmother's village in northern France.

Collias attended Santa Monica High School and moved to New York to further pursue her career and attend The New School. She has also taken classes at the Lee Strasberg Theatre and Film Institute.

== Career ==
Collias received critical acclaim for her performance in Good One. In 2025 she had a supporting role in the crime comedy film Roofman.

In 2026, Collias appeared in a main role in the Apple TV psychological thriller miniseries Cape Fear. She was cast in the upcoming horror film The Young People, directed by Osgood Perkins.

== Filmography ==
| Year | Title | Role | Notes |
|---|---|---|---|
| 2022 | Palm Trees and Power Lines | Emma | |
| 2024 | Good One | Sam | |
| 2025 | Roofman | Lindsay Wainscott | |
| 2026 | Cape Fear | Natalie Bowden | Main role |
| TBA | The Young People | | Post-production |
