= Max Cady =

- Robert Mitchum as Max Cady in Cape Fear (1962).
- First appearance: The Executioners (novel); Cape Fear (film)
- Created by: John D. MacDonald
- Portrayed by: Robert Mitchum (1962); Robert De Niro (1991); Javier Bardem (2026)

In-universe information
- Gender: Male
- Nationality: American

Max Cady is a fictional character and the primary antagonist of the John D. MacDonald novel The Executioners. He was portrayed by Robert Mitchum in J. Lee Thompson's Cape Fear, by Robert De Niro in Martin Scorsese's remake, and by Javier Bardem in Nick Antosca's television remake.

== Character overview ==
Robert De Niro as Max Cady in the 1991 remake.

In both film versions of MacDonald's novel, Cady is a criminal with an obsessive grudge against an attorney named Sam Bowden (played by Gregory Peck in the first film and by Nick Nolte in the remake) who sent him to prison for rape. While in prison, Cady learns all he can about law as he nurtures his hatred of Bowden, made especially intense when his wife divorces him and takes their child. Upon his release, he terrorizes Bowden and his family, stalking his wife at their house and attempting to seduce Bowden's teenaged daughter. After Bowden's failed attempts to get rid of Cady with bribery and a restraining order, he hires street thugs to rough Cady up, which only succeeds in making him angrier and more determined to make sure Bowden "learns all about loss". Cady tracks the family to its summer home in the titular North Carolina beach town of Cape Fear and nearly kills them all. In the climax of the first film, Bowden puts Cady under citizen's arrest; in the second, Cady and Bowden fight during an extreme thunderstorm, which culminates in Cady being dragged away by the currents of a nearby river and drowning.

=== Differences between the films ===
Significant differences are seen between the way in which Cady is portrayed in the original film and the remake. Mitchum's characterization is that of a sleazy, degenerate con artist, while De Niro's is of a homicidal sociopath, who viciously attacks everything and everyone Bowden holds dear (he even beats, mutilates and rapes a woman who is in love with Bowden). The remake also sheds some light on Cady's background, revealing he grew up in a rural Pentecostal family who handled snakes and drank strychnine to achieve religious ecstasy. Along with becoming learned in the law while in prison, he has also read and taken motivation from the works of writers and philosophers such as Angelus Silesius and Friedrich Nietzsche.

Also, many differences occur in the films' portrayals of Cady and Bowden's relationship. In the first film, Bowden merely testified against Cady in court. In the remake, Bowden was Cady's attorney who deliberately suppressed evidence that may have lightened the then-illiterate Cady's sentence or granted him an acquittal. Most notably, Cady's fate differs in the two films. In the 1962 version, Bowden manages to grab his revolver and shoot Cady in the shoulder during a fight between the two men. Rather than finish him off, Bowden spares Cady so he will be forced to spend the rest of his life in jail.

In the remake, Bowden is able to handcuff Cady's ankle to a railing in the houseboat before it hits submerged rocks and begins to break apart. The two exchange blows with rocks, and Bowden savagely attempts to bring a large rock down on Cady's head. Before he can do so, though, Cady is washed out into the river, still cuffed to part of the houseboat, madly crying out, speaking in tongues, screaming the hymn "On Jordan's Stormy Banks I Stand". Bowden then watches as Cady gives him one final glare before being pulled to the bottom of the river to drown.

=== In the television series ===
Cady is a former restauranteur imprisoned for the murder of his pregnant wife rather than a rape like other adaptations. His backstory is changed as being the son of an American military father and a young Basque woman he impregnated. Cady was raised in Spain until the age of thirteen, when his mother killed herself, and was sent to rural North Carolina to be raised by his father. His father is shown to have been deeply abusive, forcing his son to live in a dog cage and repeatedly waterboarding him in the name of religion. Later, in prison, he attempts to offset this influence in his life by adopting Santería and becoming a devotee of the oricha Changó, whose significance he distorts in service of his delusions.

Another change is the circumstance of Cady's murder case. In the show, he was represented by Anna Devereaux, who was pregnant with her firstborn child Natalie and having an affair with the prosecuting lawyer, Tom Bowden, whom she married shortly after the case finished. Anna convinced Cady to plead guilty, which he did, and both she and Tom conspired to put Cady in jail. While in prison, Cady was the victim of a brutal prison fight in which he killed two inmates and injured another, but was left with a large skull fracture and permanent brain damage that causes frequent hallucinations and seizures. In the present day, Cady gets released from jail after his mistress' suicide note convicts her of the crime and begins to torment the Bowden family, seeking revenge for a crime he claims he is innocent of.

Cady parlays his seeming innocence to foster a good image and begins advocating for the rights of the falsely accused, becoming a beloved public figure in Savannah and the true crime community. Anna serves as his lawyer to help him get a four-million dollar settlement as a result of his imprisonment, and they form a shaky alliance, with Cady helping her get several of her clients off of death row and implying a dark attraction towards her. By using her desire for a real father, he convinces his teenage daughter Nevaeh to worm her way into the Bowden family by seducing both Natalie and her younger half-brother Zack, who she convinces to bite off his own toe. She kills her own mother (a former nurse at the penitentiary where Max was held), moves into the Bowdens family's crawl space behind the walls, drugs the family with acid, and drugs Zack repeatedly in private to brainwash him into believing he is Max Cady's unborn son, which lands him in a psych unit. He is also repeatedly stalked by a mysterious woman named Crystal, who suggests having a romantic past with him.

It is later revealed that Natalie is potentially Max Cady's daughter with Anna, who was a drinker and promiscuous before the events which led to Max Cady's trial, and so her pregnancy during the trial could have been by Cady, which would make Natalie and Nevaeh half-sisters. Although Max is guilty of many things, his initial confinement was unjust and led by Anna and Tom. Crystal, who is revealed to be Cady's half-sister, admits to Anna that she murdered Max Cady's wife as she didn't believe she deserved "that good life". Crystal is obsessed with Max having been seduced by him and becoming impregnated. She had a son who is now roughly the same age as Max's would-be son with his murdered, pregnant wife.

After Anna informs Max of Crystal's involvement with his wife's death, he tracks down his father, Crystal, and her son Luke at the Cady family's houseboat on the Cape Fear River. He knocks Crystal and Luke unconscious, traps his father in the same dog cage he was locked up in as a child, and then burns down the boat, killing them. During the opening of his new restaurant, Anna publicly humiliates Max by playing a recording of Nevaeh confessing his crimes, which gets him arrested again. As a Category 5 hurricane descends on Savannah, Max quickly escapes from jail by bribing a prison guard and ambushes the Bowdens at their home, holding them captive and forcing Anna and Tom to admit the truth by threatening to kill their children. Anna and Tom admit they conspired to put Max in prison for life because of the possibility that Natalie could be his biological child. Max proceeds to learn through Luke's birth certificate that Crystal's son was actually the unborn child his wife was pregnant with; after murdering her, Crystal then stole her fetus and raised the child as her own. Max becomes distraught over having killed his son and the Bowdens use this distraction to free themselves of their restraints and flee. After a brief fright, Anna and Tom subdue Max by holding him under in the family pool, but ultimately decide not to go through with killing him. The series ends with Max being sent back to jail to live the rest of his life out.

=== Differences between the book and the films ===
In the novel by John D. MacDonald, Sam Bowden testified against Max Cady back in World War II, since he witnessed the latter raping a fourteen-year-old girl when he was stationed in Australia. Cady was sentenced to life at a hard labor prison camp but was released thirteen years later. Cady nurtured his grudge against Bowden during his time which was exacerbated due to his wife divorcing him and his only son dying in an accident. Unlike in the films, Cady refers to Bowden as "lieutenant" instead of "counselor".

Cady's background differs from the films in that he hails from West Virginia and has three brothers, all of whom were criminals (with one killed during a prison riot). They are not religious zealots like in the 1991 film. However, in the book, Cady is very much a violent psychopath who has no remorse for anything he does which includes, among many other despicable acts, shooting one of Bowden's children with a rifle. He is determined to kill Bowden "six times".

Cady's fate in the book is being shot by Bowden as he flees from their home after attacking Bowden's wife. In the wee hours of the morning during a police search, his body is found in the woods behind the Bowden home. He died of excessive blood loss from two of Bowden's shots.

In the film adaptations, Cady has no children of his own and does not appear to have been married. In the television series, he was married to a woman named Melissa whom he allegedly killed while she was pregnant with his child; in the present day, he suffers from vivid hallucinations of Melissa and their unborn son Adam. He had a mistress, Amy Brancato, around the time his wife was killed; Amy's suicide in the present day and her note seemingly admitting she was the one who killed Melissa is what allows Cady to go free. He also has an illegitimate teenage daughter named Nevaeh Valentine, who was the product of an affair between him and a prison nurse, and uses her need for his approval to get her to torment the teenage Bowden siblings. Cady's own half-sister Crystal is sexually obsessed with him and stalks him after his release from prison, and she was the one who murdered Melissa out of jealousy. Furthermore, Crystal stole Adam from the womb after killing Melissa and raised him as her own son, as she was infertile and could not have children of her own. Cady is also possibly the biological father of Natalie Bowden, as he may have taken advantage of her mother Anna while she was blackout drunk around the time of Natalie's conception.

== Cultural impact ==
- Mitchum's portrayal of Cady ranks number 28 on the American Film Institute's list of the top 50 movie villains of all time.
- Cady was parodied in a 1993 episode of The Simpsons entitled "Cape Feare", in which Sideshow Bob stalks the Simpson family to a lake town to get revenge on Bart.
- De Niro's portrayal of Cady was the inspiration for professional wrestler Dan Spivey's Waylon Mercy character in 1995, which in turn led to Windham Rotunda, another professional wrestler, portrayed a character named Bray Wyatt, who was also loosely modeled after De Niro's version of the character.
