= George Tomasini =

American film editor

- Born: April 20, 1909; Springfield, Massachusetts, U.S.
- Died: November 22, 1964 (aged 55); Hanford, California, U.S.
- Occupation: Film editor
- Years active: 1939–1964
- Spouse: Mary Brian (m. 1947–1964)

George Tomasini (April 20, 1909 – November 22, 1964) was an American film editor, born in Springfield, Massachusetts, who had a decade-long collaboration with director Alfred Hitchcock, editing nine of his movies between 1954 and 1964. Tomasini edited many of Hitchcock's best-known works, such as Rear Window (1954), Vertigo (1958), North by Northwest (1959), Psycho (1960), and The Birds (1963), as well as other well-received films such as Cape Fear (1962). On a 2012 listing of the 75 best-edited films of all time, compiled by the Motion Picture Editors Guild based on a survey of its members, four films edited by Tomasini for Hitchcock appear. No other editor appeared more than three times on this listing. The listed films were Psycho, Vertigo, Rear Window, and North by Northwest.

George Tomasini was known for his innovative film editing, which together with Hitchcock's stunning techniques, redefined cinematic language. Tomasini's cutting was always stylish and experimental, all the while pursuing the focus of the story and the characters. Hitchcock and Tomasini's editing of Rear Window has been treated at length in Valerie Orpen's monograph, Film Editing: The Art of the Expressive. His dialogue overlapping and use of jump cuts for exclamation points was dynamic and innovative (such as in the scene in The Birds where the car blows up at the gas station and Tippi Hedren's character watches from a window, as well as the infamous "shower scene" in Psycho). George Tomasini's techniques would influence many subsequent film editors and filmmakers.

George Tomasini was nominated for the Academy Award for Best Film Editing for North by Northwest, but Ben-Hur's editors won the award that year.

On November 22, 1964, while he was editing In Harm's Way, Tomasini died of a massive heart attack. He was 55 years old. He left behind Mary Brian, his wife of 17 years and no children.

== Filmography as film editor ==
Editor
Year	Film	Director	Notes
1947	Wild Harvest	Tay Garnett	
1952	The Turning Point	William Dieterle	First collaboration with William Dieterle
1953	Stalag 17	Billy Wilder	
1953	Houdini	George Marshall	
1954	Elephant Walk	William Dieterle	Second collaboration with William Dieterle
1954	Rear Window	Alfred Hitchcock	First collaboration with Alfred Hitchcock
1955	To Catch a Thief	Alfred Hitchcock	Second collaboration with Alfred Hitchcock
1956	The Man Who Knew Too Much	Alfred Hitchcock	Third collaboration with Alfred Hitchcock
1956	The Wrong Man	Alfred Hitchcock	Fourth collaboration with Alfred Hitchcock
1957	Hear Me Good	Don McGuire	
1958	Vertigo	Alfred Hitchcock	Fifth collaboration with Alfred Hitchcock
1958	I Married a Monster from Outer Space	Gene Fowler Jr.	
1959	North by Northwest	Alfred Hitchcock	Sixth collaboration with Alfred Hitchcock
1960	The Time Machine	George Pal	First collaboration with George Pal
1960	Psycho	Alfred Hitchcock	Seventh collaboration with Alfred Hitchcock
1961	The Misfits	John Huston	
1962	Cape Fear	J. Lee Thompson	
1963	The Birds	Alfred Hitchcock	Eighth collaboration with Alfred Hitchcock
1963	Who's Been Sleeping in My Bed?	Daniel Mann	
1964	7 Faces of Dr. Lao	George Pal	Second collaboration with George Pal
1964	Marnie	Alfred Hitchcock	Ninth collaboration with Alfred Hitchcock
1965	In Harm's Way	Otto Preminger	

Editorial department
Year	Film	Director	Role	Notes	Other notes
1948	Beyond Glory	John Farrow	Assistant editor	First collaboration with John Farrow	Uncredited
1948	Night Has a Thousand Eyes	John Farrow	Assistant editor	Second collaboration with John Farrow	Uncredited
1949	Red, Hot and Blue	John Farrow	Assistant editor	Third collaboration with John Farrow	Uncredited

Sound department
Year	Film	Director	Role	Notes
1939	Union Pacific	Cecil B. DeMille	Sound effects editor	Uncredited

Shorts

Editor
Year	Film	Director
1951	Benjy	Fred Zinnemann

Tomasini's most important work with Hitchcock was the memorable shower scene in Psycho (1960). Its aesthetic and dramatic accomplishment was achieved largely through the editor's skill. The completed forty-five second sequence that Hitchcock originally storyboarded was compiled by Tomasini from footage shot over several days that utilized a total of over seventy camera setups. From that mass of footage, Tomasini selected sixty different shots, some of them very short, through which he elected to rely heavily on the techniques of 'associative editing'.

— Paul Monaco

== See also ==
- List of film director and editor collaborations
