= Cape Fear (1991 film) =

1991 film directed by Martin Scorsese

- Theatrical release poster by John Alvin
- Directed by: Martin Scorsese
- Screenplay by: Wesley Strick
- Based on: Cape Fear (1962 film) by James R. Webb; The Executioners (1957 novel) by John D. MacDonald
- Produced by: Barbara De Fina
- Starring: Robert De Niro; Nick Nolte; Jessica Lange; Juliette Lewis; Joe Don Baker; Robert Mitchum; Gregory Peck; Martin Balsam; Illeana Douglas; Fred Thompson
- Cinematography: Freddie Francis
- Edited by: Thelma Schoonmaker
- Music by: Bernard Herrmann Elmer Bernstein
- Production companies: Amblin Entertainment; Cappa Films; Tribeca Productions
- Distributed by: Universal Pictures
- Release date: November 15, 1991
- Running time: 128 minutes
- Country: United States
- Language: English
- Budget: $35 million
- Box office: $182.3 million

Cape Fear is a 1991 American Southern Gothic psychological thriller film directed by Martin Scorsese from a screenplay by Wesley Strick. It is a remake of the 1962 film, which is based on the 1957 novel The Executioners by John D. MacDonald. The film stars Robert De Niro, Nick Nolte, Jessica Lange, Joe Don Baker, and Juliette Lewis.

The film tells the story of a convicted rapist who, by using his newfound knowledge of the law and its numerous loopholes, seeks vengeance against a former public defender whom he blames for his fourteen years in prison due to purposefully botching his legal defense.

Cape Fear was released by Universal Pictures on November 15, 1991, marking the seventh collaboration between Scorsese and De Niro. The film was a commercial success and became the first Scorsese film to gross more than $100 million. It received generally positive reviews from critics. It was nominated for several awards, including the Oscars and Golden Globe Awards for Best Actor (De Niro) and Best Supporting Actress (Lewis). A television miniseries adaptation debuted in 2026.

== Plot ==
Max Cady, a psychopathic rapist, is released from prison after finishing a full sentence for the rape and battery of a 16-year-old girl. During his trial in Atlanta fourteen years earlier, his public defender, Sam Bowden, was so appalled by Cady's crimes that he hid a police report stating that the victim was promiscuous, which might have lightened Cady's sentence or acquitted him altogether. Bowden assumed that Cady, who was illiterate at the time of the trial, would never become aware of the report.

Bowden has since gone into private practice and now lives in fictional New Essex, North Carolina, with his wife Leigh and their teenage daughter Danielle ("Dani"). Cady moves to New Essex and quickly makes his presence known to Bowden. He explains that after learning to read in prison, he taught himself law and attempted several unsuccessful appeals of his case representing himself, implying that he knows about the hidden report. He soon begins to stalk and terrorize the Bowden family. After failing to pay Cady off, Bowden tries to have him charged for kidnapping and poisoning the family dog but is told by the authorities that there's no proof Cady is responsible.

Cady then targets Lori Davis, a courthouse clerk, and rapes her. Davis refuses Bowden's pleas to report the attack after Cady reveals that he knows about her inappropriate flirtations with Bowden. Bowden hires private investigator Claude Kersek to discreetly follow Cady, but this fails when Cady confronts him in public.

Impersonating her drama teacher, Cady approaches Dani and kisses her. When Bowden learns of this, he reluctantly agrees to Kersek's suggestion that they hire men to beat Cady and run him out of town. Before the beating, Bowden gives Cady a final warning to leave New Essex, threatening physical harm if he does not. He is unaware that Cady uses a tape recorder to record the threat. Kersek's hired thugs ambush Cady but are driven off when Cady demonstrates his unnatural strength. Cady uses the recording and exaggerations of his injuries to file for a restraining order against Bowden, which is granted. Cady's attorney petitions the ABA Ethics Committee for Bowden's disbarment, triggering a two-day emergency meeting in Raleigh.

Thinking that Cady may break into the Bowden home while Bowden is away, Kersek fakes his departure and prepares to shoot Cady in self-defense. Cady sneaks in undetected and kills the housekeeper, Graciela. Donning her clothes, he blindsides and murders Kersek before fleeing. After discovering the bodies, the Bowdens decide to hide aboard their old houseboat docked upstate along the Cape Fear River, not knowing that Cady has strapped himself to their car's undercarriage.

While Bowden is on deck and Leigh and Dani are in the cabin, Cady subdues Bowden and ties him up. He severs the rope anchoring the boat, setting it adrift into a violent thunderstorm. When Cady announces his intention to rape her and her mother, Dani sprays lighter fluid onto him as he lights a cigar, causing him to jump off the boat. Bowden attempts to steer the boat back to safety, but a badly burned Cady (having grabbed onto the towline) holds him at gunpoint with Kersek's pistol.

As the boat is rocked by the storm, Cady conducts a mock trial. Beating Bowden into confessing that he hid the report, Cady scolds him for failing to do his duty as an attorney, sentencing him "to the ninth circle of hell." The storm knocks Cady off his feet, allowing Bowden to gain the upper hand. As Leigh and Dani swim to shore, Bowden cuffs Cady to the boat as it breaks apart before grabbing a large rock to bring down on Cady's head. Just as he slams it down, the current carries Cady and the wreckage away from shore.

As the boat sinks, Cady speaks madly in tongues and sings the hymn "On Jordan's Stormy Banks I Stand." Cady exchanges a final glare with Bowden, before the wreckage as well as Cady himself sinks to the bottom of the bay. Cady accepts his fate and drowns as the family flees.

== Cast ==
Robert De Niro as Max Cady, a role in which he was nominated for the Academy Award for Best Actor.

- Robert De Niro as Max Cady
- Nick Nolte as Samuel G. Bowden
- Jessica Lange as Leigh Bowden
- Juliette Lewis as Danielle Bowden
- Joe Don Baker as Claude Kersek
- Robert Mitchum as Lieutenant Elgart
- Gregory Peck as Lee Heller
- Martin Balsam as Judge
- Illeana Douglas as Lori Davis
- Fred Dalton Thompson as Tom Broadbent
- Zully Montero as Graciela
- Domenica Cameron-Scorsese as Danielle's friend

== Production ==
=== Development ===
The film's screenplay is adapted by Wesley Strick from the original screenplay by James R. Webb, which is based on the novel The Executioners by John D. MacDonald.

Originally developed by Steven Spielberg, he eventually decided that it was too violent and traded it to Martin Scorsese in exchange for Schindler's List, which Scorsese had decided not to make. Scorsese agreed to direct Cape Fear out of gratitude, as Universal had supported Scorsese during the controversy over The Last Temptation of Christ.

Although Spielberg stayed as a producer through his company Amblin Entertainment, he chose not to be credited personally on the finished film.

=== Casting ===
Although Scorsese had previously worked with Nick Nolte in New York Stories (1989), he originally envisioned Harrison Ford in the role of Sam Bowden. However, Ford was interested only in playing Max Cady. Nolte, who, by contrast, was more interested in playing Bowden, convinced Scorsese to cast him instead. Several young women auditioned for the part of Danielle Bowden, including Drew Barrymore and Reese Witherspoon, and Spielberg reportedly wanted Bill Murray to play Cady.

Nolte lost weight for the film while Robert De Niro gained muscle; this ensured that De Niro, who was noticeably shorter than Nolte, still came across as physically threatening on screen. De Niro had his teeth ground down, sharpened and deformed, a procedure he later paid $20,000 to have reversed after filming.

Robert Mitchum has a small role in the film, while Gregory Peck (in his final theatrical film role) and Martin Balsam make cameo appearances: all three starred in the original film.

=== Filming ===
Principal photography began on November 19, 1990 in Fort Lauderdale, Florida. Shooting took place at various locations around South Florida, including Fort Lauderdale and Hollywood (for the 'New Essex' town exteriors), Miami (for the courthouse interiors and exteriors), and Everglades National Park. The high school scene was filmed at Broward College. The climatic sequence aboard the boat was filmed in a 90-foot water tank, housed in a soundstage specially built for the productions.

Derek Meddings created the special effects miniatures used in the film's climax.

=== Style ===
The work of Alfred Hitchcock was a significant influence on the style of Cape Fear. As with the 1962 film, in which director J. Lee Thompson specifically acknowledged Hitchcock's influence, and employed Bernard Herrmann to write the score, Scorsese also adopted Hitchcock's style, using unusual camera angles, lighting and editing techniques. The opening credits were designed by Saul Bass, a frequent collaborator of Hitchcock, and the link to Hitchcock was further cemented by the reuse of Herrmann's original score, albeit reworked by Elmer Bernstein. Portions of Bass's title sequences were reused from the unreleased ending to his film Phase IV.

Cape Fear was Scorsese's first film to be shot in the 2:35:1 "CinemaScope" aspect ratio. Wanting to evoke the style of an "old-fashioned melodrama," he hired Freddie Francis as cinematographer, because he admired the Gothic style he brought to his work on The Innocents and his Hammer horror films. Scorsese:

"[Francis] knows the atmosphere that I want for this picture. He knows the lighting — whatever it takes to get that incredible, Gothic thriller look. He understands the obligatory scene of a young maiden with a candle walking down a long hall towards a door. 'Don't go in that door!' you yell, and she goes in! Every time she goes in! So I say to him, 'This has to look like The Hall,' and he understands that."

== Release ==
=== Home media ===
For its 10th anniversary, Cape Fear was released on a THX certified two-disc Collector's Edition DVD on September 18, 2001. It was released on Blu-Ray in October 2011.

== Reception ==
=== Box office ===
Cape Fear collected $10.5 million during its opening weekend, ranking first at the box office, beating Curly Sue. It was overtaken by The Addams Family a week later, but still made another $10 million while staying ahead of animated newcomers Beauty and the Beast and An American Tail: Fievel Goes West. The film was a box-office success, making $182,291,969 worldwide on a $35-million budget.

=== Critical response ===
On review aggregator website Rotten Tomatoes, the film holds an approval rating of 77% with a mean of 6.9 of a possible 10, based on 60 reviews. The site's critics consensus reads: "Smart and stylish, Cape Fear is a gleefully mainstream shocker from Martin Scorsese, with a terrifying Robert De Niro performance." On Metacritic, the film has a weighted average score of 73 out of 100, based on 9 critics, indicating "generally favorable" reviews. Audiences polled by CinemaScore gave the film an average grade of "B+" on a scale of A+ to F.

Roger Ebert of the Chicago Sun-Times gave the film three stars out of four, commenting:

Cape Fear is impressive moviemaking, showing Scorsese as a master of a traditional Hollywood genre who is able to mold it to his own themes and obsessions. But as I look at this $35 million movie with big stars, special effects and production values, I wonder whether it represents a good omen from the finest director now at work.

In 2015, Taste of Cinema ranked the film 13th among the "30 Great Psychopath Movies That Are Worth Your Time", and GamesRadar+ named Cady one of the "50 Creepiest Movie Psychopaths".

=== Awards and honors ===
Institution	Category	Subject	Result	Ref.
Academy Awards	Best Actor	Robert De Niro	Nominated	
Academy Awards	Best Supporting Actress	Juliette Lewis	Nominated	
Golden Globe Awards	Best Actor – Motion Picture Drama	Robert De Niro	Nominated	
Golden Globe Awards	Best Supporting Actress – Motion Picture	Juliette Lewis	Nominated	
British Academy Film Awards	Best Cinematography	Freddie Francis	Nominated	
British Academy Film Awards	Best Editing	Thelma Schoonmaker	Nominated	
Berlin International Film Festival	Golden Berlin Bear	Martin Scorsese	Nominated	
BMI Film Music Awards	—N/a	Elmer Bernstein	Won	
Chicago Film Critics Association Awards	Best Director	Martin Scorsese	Nominated	
Chicago Film Critics Association Awards	Best Supporting Actress	Juliette Lewis	Nominated	
Chicago Film Critics Association Awards	Most Promising Actress	Juliette Lewis	Won	
David di Donatello Awards	Best Foreign Actor	Robert De Niro	Nominated	
Jupiter Awards	Best International Actor	Robert De Niro	Won	
Kansas City Film Critics Circle Awards	Best Supporting Actress	Juliette Lewis	Won	
MTV Movie Awards	Best Kiss	Juliette Lewis	Nominated	
MTV Movie Awards	Best Kiss	Robert De Niro	Nominated	
MTV Movie Awards	Best Male Performance	Robert De Niro	Nominated	
MTV Movie Awards	Best Villain	Robert De Niro	Nominated	
National Society of Film Critics Awards	Best Supporting Actress	Juliette Lewis	2nd place	
New York Film Critics Circle Awards	Best Supporting Actress	Juliette Lewis	2nd place	
New York Film Critics Circle Awards	Best Cinematographer	Freddie Francis	2nd place	

== In popular culture ==
The film is parodied in the 1993 The Simpsons episode "Cape Feare", with Sideshow Bob in the role of Cady stalking Bart Simpson. The episode parodies several scenes from the 1991 film. The parody was itself the basis for Anne Washburn's play Mr. Burns, a Post-Electric Play, which imagines post-apocalyptic theater troupes attempting to recreate the episode, and by extension, the two films and the novel.

In the 2003 film Charlie's Angels: Full Throttle, the Seamus O'Grady prison introduction scene is a direct reference to Max Cady's prison-set intro.

The film is parodied as Cape Munster in the premiere episode of The Ben Stiller Show, with Ben Stiller playing an adult Eddie Munster stalking the family of a studio executive (played by Bob Odenkirk) out of anger for his show being canceled.

The film was the inspiration for professional wrestler Dan Spivey's character Waylon Mercy in the World Wrestling Federation (now WWE) in 1995, and subsequently, for professional wrestler Bray Wyatt's original The Wyatt Family character in WWE in 2014.

Seinfeld also parodied the film with the 1998 episode "The Bookstore".

== Television adaptation ==
On November 21, 2023, a television adaptation was announced, with several networks in a bidding war to air it. Spielberg and Scorsese are signed on as executive producers while the showrunner is Nick Antosca. The series will be released on Apple TV+.

On November 18, 2024, it was revealed that Javier Bardem was cast as Max Cady. On February 11, 2025, it was revealed that Amy Adams was cast as Anna Bowden. Both Adams and Bardem executive produce the series, in addition to starring.

On February 25, 2025, Patrick Wilson joined the cast in the series in an undisclosed role. On April 7, 2025, Wilson's role was revealed as Tom Bowden. It was also revealed that CCH Pounder joined the cast, with Morten Tyldum now on board to executive produce and direct the pilot.

The series premiered on June 5, 2026.

== See also ==
- List of films featuring home invasions
- List of 1991 box office number-one films in the United States
- Night and the City, another remake also starring De Niro and Lange

== Bibliography ==
- Thain, Gerald J. (2001). "Cape Fear, Two Versions and Two Visions Separated by Thirty Years". In Machura, S.; Robson, P (eds.). Law and Film: Representing Law in Movies. Cambridge: Blackwell Publishing. ISBN 0-631-22816-0.
