= Viktoria (film) =

- Film poster
- Directed by: Maya Vitkova
- Written by: Maya Vitkova
- Produced by: Maya Vitkova
- Starring: Irmena Chichikova; Daria Vitkova; Kalina Vitkova; Mariana Krumova
- Cinematography: Krum Rodriguez
- Edited by: Alexander Etimov
- Music by: Kaloyan Dimitrov
- Production companies: Mandragora; Viktoria Films
- Release date: January 19, 2014 (Sundance Film Festival)
- Running time: 155 minutes
- Countries: Bulgaria; Romania
- Language: Bulgarian

Viktoria (Bulgarian: Виктория) is a 2014 Bulgarian-Romanian drama film written, directed and produced by Maya Vitkova. The film premiered in-competition in the World Cinema Dramatic Competition at 2014 Sundance Film Festival on January 19, 2014.

On January 26, it premiered at 2014 International Film Festival Rotterdam. The film later screened at the 2014 Göteborg International Film Festival.

== Plot ==
On 10 November, 1979 - 10 years before the collapse of Communism in Europe, Boryana is determined not to give birth to a child in Communist Bulgaria. The only thing Boryana longs for is to escape to the West. But despite her attempt to protect herself from unwanted pregnancy, her baby survives... Unwanted, Viktoria is born with no umbilical cord to connect her to her mother and thus proclaimed "the baby of the decade". Viktoria becomes a symbol of Communist Bulgaria. While growing up, she dominates her environment and is at subconscious war with her mother - the one who didn't want her. But on 10 November, 1989, when the political situation collapses, turning Viktoria's life upside down, the hardships of the new time bind her and her mother together.

== Cast ==
- Irmena Chichikova as Boryana
- Daria Vitkova as Viktoria (9-year-old)
- Kalina Vitkova as Viktoria (teenager)
- Mariana Krumova as Dima
- Dimo Dimov as Ivan
- Georgi Spasov as Todor Zhivkov
- Svetoslav Draganov as Sando
- Simeon Tsolov as Stefcho (9-year-old)
- Ivo Karamanski as Stefcho (teenager)
- Katerina Angelova as Baby Viktoria

== Reception ==
=== Critical response ===
Viktoria received mostly positive reviews upon its premiere at the 2014 Sundance Film Festival. On review aggregator Rotten Tomatoes, the film holds an approval rating of 81% based on 26 reviews, with an average rating of 6.6/10. On Metacritic, the film has a weighted average score of 55 out of 100, based on 10 critics, indicating "mixed or average reviews".

Dennis Harvey of Variety said in his review that "“Viktoria’s” first hundred minutes or so offer an arresting mix of satire, surrealism and ambivalently angsty drama, with the helmer in precocious full command of pacing, tone and aesthetics." Boyd van Hoeij in his review for The Hollywood Reporter called it "A striking first film about a young child without a belly button that explores the relationship of Bulgarians with their country, history and families."

Emma Myers of Indiewire graded the film B+ and praised the performances of Chichikova and Kalina Vitkova by saying that "Kalina Vitkova, whose big brown eyes communicate a great deal of pain and longing. But it's Irmena Chichikova as Boryana who steals the screen. With deep set eyes and razor sharp cheek bones that recall Charlotte Rampling in her heyday, she’s not only striking to look at but subtly expressive. Though she puts on a stoic front, her final scene hints at the deep and invisible motivations of her character."

=== Accolades ===
| Year | Award | Category | Recipient | Result |
|---|---|---|---|---|
| 2014 | Sundance Film Festival | World Cinema Grand Jury Prize: Dramatic | Maya Vitkova | Nominated |
| 2014 | International Film Festival Rotterdam | Tiger Award | Maya Vitkova | Nominated |
| 2014 | Göteborg International Film Festival | International Debut Award | Maya Vitkova | Nominated |
