= Good One (film) =

2024 American film by India Donaldson

- Release poster
- Directed by: India Donaldson
- Written by: India Donaldson
- Produced by: Diana Irvine; Graham Mason; Wilson Cameron; India Donaldson
- Starring: Lily Collias; James Le Gros; Danny McCarthy
- Cinematography: Wilson Cameron
- Edited by: Graham Mason
- Music by: Celia Hollander
- Production companies: International Pigeon; Smudge Films; Tinygiant; Baird Street Pictures
- Distributed by: Metrograph Pictures
- Release dates: January 21, 2024 (Sundance); August 9, 2024 (United States)
- Running time: 90 minutes
- Country: United States
- Language: English
- Box office: $352,135

Good One is a 2024 American drama film, written, directed, and produced by India Donaldson in her directorial debut. It stars Lily Collias, James Le Gros and Danny McCarthy.

It had its world premiere at the 2024 Sundance Film Festival on January 21, 2024, and was released on August 9, 2024, by Metrograph Pictures. It received critical acclaim and was named one of the top 10 independent films of 2024 by the National Board of Review.

== Plot ==
Sam is a girl who plans to go on a weekend-long camping trip in the Catskills with her father, Chris; his recently divorced friend, Matt; and Matt's son, Dylan. Dylan, resentful of the divorce, refuses to go. Sam seems upset by this and offers to talk to Dylan, but is rebuffed. On the way there, Matt and Chris banter back and forth, with Matt making jokes and Chris teasing him. Sam sleeps in the car on the way, occasionally waking up when Chris asks her to respond to a text on his phone. The three of them get one hotel room, with Sam sleeping on a sleeping bag on the floor while the two men take the beds. At dinner, Matt teases Sam light-heartedly about her being queer, and teases Chris about having a newborn baby at home with his second wife.

On the way from the hotel to the trail, Sam drives while Chris criticizes her driving. When they arrive, Chris criticizes Matt for packing too much stuff for the trail, dumping out his pack and identifying unnecessary items. The trio hikes for a while, with Sam enjoying quiet moments in nature. As they hike, Sam repeatedly has to leave the trail to change her tampon. Some time after they begin hiking, Matt realizes he had forgotten his sleeping bag in the car, and Chris makes fun of him for doing so. When she gets cell reception, Sam texts her girlfriend back home.

That night, as they are making camp, three hikers come and pitch camp directly next to them. Sam wants to ask them to move, but her father says to let it go. Sam cooks ramen for Chris and Matt, who praise her cooking. After dinner, the three hikers join them around the fire, talking about previous hikes. Envious of the places they have been, Chris half-jokingly resolves to hike through China.

The next day, the three continue their hike, and enjoy many quiet moments in nature. Throughout the hike, Sam often takes on responsibilities of caring for the group, such as dismantling the tent. They arrive at a picturesque overlook and spend time admiring the beauty. Matt comments that he should go on more hikes, and Chris condescendingly agrees. That night, Sam, Chris, and Matt sit around the fire telling scary stories. Chris and Matt are drinking, and are visibly intoxicated. Matt tells the story of him and Dylan's mother cheating on one another as a "spooky story" and Sam criticizes him for not taking more responsibility for his role in his marriage ending. In doing so, she criticizes her dad for dating a woman shortly after divorcing her mother, and having a newborn baby at this stage of his life. Matt and Chris praise Sam's wisdom and knowledge, and Matt tells Chris, "you got a good one." Chris goes to bed, and Sam and Matt continue talking. Matt continues to speak self-deprecatingly, with Sam offering insights. Matt calls her wise, and praises her maturity. Sam says she is going to go to bed, and jokingly offers to keep the fire going so Matt can sleep next to it, since he had forgotten his sleeping bag. Matt responds by suggesting that Sam could join him in his tent to keep him warm. Sam sits in stunned silence before leaving.

The next day, Sam and Chris go off on their own and go swimming. Sam tries to tell her father about what Matt had said, but Chris brushes her off, telling her she can't be offended by what Matt says and that he wants to just have a nice day. Sam goes off on her own and cries, feeling betrayed by her father and family friend. She collects rocks, which she puts in Chris and Matt's packs. She then hikes ahead of them, going back to the car on her own. When Chris and Matt catch up, Chris is angry with Sam for leaving without them and asks her to drive. Sam agrees to drive, but locks Chris and Matt out of the car. After a few moments, she unlocks the car. Her father climbs into the passenger seat, makes eye contact with Sam, and sets a rock on the dashboard.

== Cast ==
- Lily Collias as Sam
- James Le Gros as Chris
- Danny McCarthy as Matt
- Julian Grady as Dylan
- Sumaya Bouhbal as Jessie
- Diana Irvine as Casey
- Sam Lanier as Zach
- Peter McNally as Jake
- Eric Yates as Andy

== Release ==
The film had its world premiere at the 2024 Sundance Film Festival on January 21, 2024. In February 2024, Metrograph Pictures acquired North American distribution rights to the film, their first acquisition since expanding into theatrical distribution of films. It also screened at New Directors/New Films Festival on April 4, 2024. and at the 2024 Cannes Film Festival in the Directors' Fortnight section. It was released on August 9, 2024.

The film has been selected for the MAMI Mumbai Film Festival 2024 under the World Cinema section.

== Reception ==
=== Critical reception ===
On the review aggregator website Rotten Tomatoes, 98% of 123 critics' reviews are positive, with an average rating of 8.2/10. The website's consensus reads: "A beautifully acted depiction of being caught between a rock and a hard place, Good One confronts difficult emotions and yields a striking feature debut for writer-director India Donaldson." Metacritic, which uses a weighted average, assigned the film a score of 87 out of 100, based on 30 critics, indicating "universal acclaim".

For The Hollywood Reporter, David Rooney wrote that "Donaldson is careful not to make the men unsympathetic, but at the same time, Collias' body language and the telltale flickers across her expressive face suggest that Sam isn't entirely comfortable with her prescriptive gender role as the designated nurturer and caregiver — the good one, as the title indicates. While it remains between the lines of the screenplay, there's significance in Sam's identity as a young queer woman ready to focus on her own relationship and future, not thrilled to be bolstering the fragile egos of two middle-aged men."

The film was ranked 8th on a list of the best movies of 2024 from The New York Times, with critic Alissa Wilkinson writing that Donaldson's "ear for dialogue and eye for detail open a whole world out on that mountain trail."

Directors Malcolm Washington and Gints Zilbalodis included Good One on their lists of their favorite movies of 2024 for Indiewire.

=== Accolades ===
Award	Ceremony date	Category	Recipient(s)	Result	Ref.
Sundance Film Festival	18 January 2024	U.S. Dramatic Competition	Good One	Nominated	
Independent Film Festival Boston	8 May 2024	Grand Jury Prize for Best Narrative Feature	Good One	Won	
Cannes Film Festival	25 May 2024	Directors' Fortnight	Good One	Nominated	
Cannes Film Festival	25 May 2024	Camera d'Or	Good One	Nominated	
Champs-Élysées Film Festival	25 June 2024	Grand Jury Prize for Best American Independent Feature Film	Good One	Won	
Melbourne International Film Festival	25 August 2024	Bright Horizons Award	Good One	Pending	
