= Metrograph Pictures =

American independent film production and distribution company

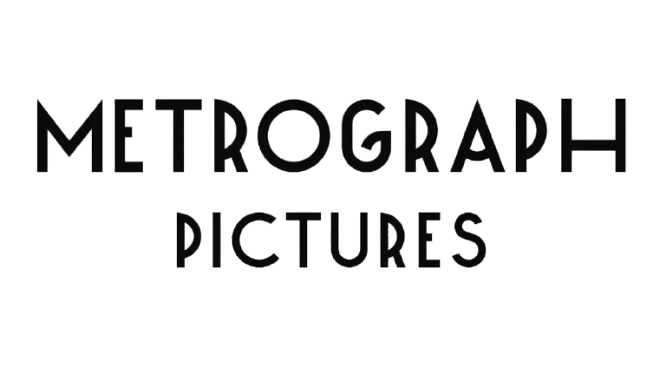
- Type: Subsidiary
- Industry: Film industry
- Founded: 2019
- Headquarters: New York City, New York, U.S.
- Parent: Metrograph
- Website: metrograph.com/metrograph-pictures

Metrograph Pictures is an American independent film production and distribution company founded in 2019.

== History ==
In 2019, Metrograph announced it would be launching Metrograph Pictures, a distribution company focusing on releasing modern and classic films.

The company has distributed film restorations including Duet for Cannibals (1969), A Bigger Splash (1973), Possession (1981), Hyenas (1992), Made in Hong Kong (1997), Downtown 81 (2000), and Goodbye, Dragon Inn (2003).

In February 2024, David Laub joined to expand the company, focusing on acquiring more films and potentially producing and financing additional films. The company's first acquisition was Good One by India Donaldson, released in August 2024.

In July 2025, it was announced that Metrograph Pictures was quietly dissolving after its distribution film chief David Laub was hired to work as senior vice president of publicity and marketing for Neon. Films they initially bought such as Happyend and Miroirs No. 3 were put back on the film sales market to be bought elsewhere.

== Filmography ==
=== 2020s ===
| Release Date | Title | Notes |
|---|---|---|
| August 9, 2024 | Good One | |
| September 13, 2024 | Meanwhile on Earth | |
| November 22, 2024 | The Black Sea | |
| December 27, 2024 | Santosh | |
| April 4, 2025 | Gazer | |
| April 25, 2025 | April | |
