= The Executioners (MacDonald novel) =

Book by John D. MacDonald

- First h/b edition
- Author: John D. MacDonald
- Cover artist: H. Lawrence Hoffman
- Language: English
- Genre: Thriller
- Publisher: Simon & Schuster
- Publication date: 1957
- Publication place: United States
- Media type: Print
- Pages: 224
- ISBN: 0449131904
- LC Class: PS3563.A28

The Executioners is a psychological thriller-suspense novel written by John D. MacDonald, published in 1957. The story tells of a lawyer being stalked and tormented by a narcissistic psychopath he helped put in prison.

It has been adapted three times under the title Cape Fear, as a film in 1962 and 1991, and as a miniseries in 2026. The first film adaptation is more faithful to the novel, with the 1991 adaptation being considerably more brutal and violent.

== Plot ==
Sam Bowden, an attorney, catches Max Cady, an illiterate and brutal sex offender, raping a girl. Bowden later testifies against him, with the jury finding Cady guilty. Cady is sent to prison for fourteen years, where he develops and nurses an obsessive grudge, fueled with rage and hatred over Bowden sending him to jail. After Cady is paroled, he begins stalking Bowden's family, not only seeking vengeance, but also envying what Bowden has, particularly eyeing Bowden's teenage daughter. Cady's vendetta slowly escalates from stalking and annoying the family to attempting to kill those he deems close to the family.

Bowden sends some thugs to beat Cady hoping to run him off. Unfortunately, the plan fails and Cady manages to beat them instead. However, as the cops respond to the fight, Cady unintentionally punches a police officer and is subsequently arrested. While this sends him to jail, Bowden realizes he will be back out soon.

Cady begins to target Bowden's immediate family next. Cady attempts to kill Bowden's son by shooting him with a rifle from far away, but fails due to the wind velocity, sending the bullet into his son's arm instead. As Bowden's wife is leaving the hospital, she nearly dies in a car crash after Cady removes the lug nuts from one of her wheels.

Desperate, Bowden decides to work with the police to set up a trap, intending to shoot Cady if he breaks in. Attempting to convince Cady that Bowden is out of town, he hides in the attic of a detached garage outside the house while a police officer named Kersek covertly stands guard in the house ready to shoot Cady, should he show up. Bowden anxiously waits in the dead of night with a gun of his own. He hears his wife screaming, followed by gunshots, but badly sprains his ankle falling from the ladder from the detached garage's attic. As he approaches the front door, it's too dark to see clearly but he can see a shadow of Cady running towards him. They collide, violently knocking Bowden to the ground, yet Bowden manages to keep hold of his revolver. As Cady is fleeing the premises, Bowden angrily shoots his gun in Cady's direction, then makes his way inside. He finds out that Cady began assaulting his wife but was interrupted by Kersek. Unfortunately, Kersek was not fast enough to kill Cady, and Cady killed Kersek instead. Realizing that the situation was a setup, Cady escaped.

The police begin their search for Cady for killing Kersek. As daylight begins, they find a trail of blood in Bowden's backyard. They follow it and find Cady's corpse, with Bowden's stray shot hitting Cady, severing an artery, and lead to Cady bleeding to death.
