= Irmena Chichikova =

Bulgarian actress

Irmena Chichikova (born Ирмена Чичикова; 22 May 1984) is a Bulgarian actress in theater, television and film.

== Education ==
Irmena Chichikova was born in Plovdiv, Bulgaria. She was raised in Plovdiv where she attended the French Language High School "Antoine de Saint Exupéry," graduating in 2003 before moving to Sofia, Bulgaria to complete her education at the Krastyo Sarafov National Academy for Theatre and Film Arts under the tutelage of Professors Margarita Mladenova and Ivan Dobchev. She also studied Modern Greek. Her diploma performances included Three Sisters by Anton Chekhov, directed by Margarita Mladenova, and Dakota / Words in Chains by Jordi Galceran and directed by Stilian Petrov. Upon graduating in 2008, she became a full-time freelance actress.

== Career ==
Chichikova made her professional stage debut in The Art of Sweeping Things Under the Rug (2008), a play based on Ingmar Bergman's Scenes From a Marriage, as Marianne, for which she received a nomination at IKAR (2009) and the award for best female lead role at the ASKEER Theater awards (2009). She received critical and commercial success on the stage. Following that she performed in Nirvana (2009), and in the following years toured Canada and France with the play Construction of the Liberated Imagination (2010) based on the works of Eugène Ionesco. She then performed in Duck Hunting (2012) by Alexander Vampilov at the Bulgarian National Theater "Ivan Vazov". In 2012 she appeared in the film I Am You (2012) for which she received critical acclaim and won the lead female award at the Golden Rose National Film Festival (2012). In 2014 she appeared in Viktoria (2014) as Boryana, the mother of a child named Viktoria who was born without an umbilical cord, which premiered at the Sundance Film Festival World Competition in January. The following year she appeared in Sound Hunters (2015).

== Film ==
In 2010 Chichikova appeared in her first feature film, The Glass River (2010). Her first lead role came in 2012 in which she portrayed, along with Janet Spassova, two women named Yura and Adriana, in Petar Popzlatev's I Am You (2012). At the end of the same year she started filming Viktoria (2014) and Sound Hunters (2015), the former selected for the official World Competition at the Sundance Film Festival in 2014 for its world premier. The film Viktoria is set in Bulgaria during the fall of communism, mixing satire, surrealism, and drama. Chichikova plays a librarian named Boryana who unintentionally becomes the mother of a daughter, Viktoria, who lacks an umbilical cord and so incurs immediate state attention, preventing her family from fleeing the country. The story resonates with the social and cultural transition from communism to democracy and an emotional journey from hatred to love.

== Theater ==
Chichikova appeared in numerous stage productions since graduating in 2008. Some notable ones include The Art of Sweeping Things Under the Rug (2008), Nirvana (2009), Construction of the Liberated Imagination (2010), Visiting the Father (2011) and Duck Hunting (2012).

== Performance Art and Side Projects ==
In 2011 she hosted the 90th celebration of the Union of Bulgarian Artists and IKAR Theatre Awards. Her first photo exhibition was POSTIDENTITY by Liliana Karadjova, begun in 2010. Since 2007 she has also been a model for fashion designer Neli Miteva as well as other young designers from Bulgaria and Macedonia.

== Awards and nominations ==
- Joint Golden Rose Film Festival (2012) award for lead female, with Janet Spassova, for their portrayal of Yura and Adriana in the film I Am You (2012), directed by Petar Popzlatev.
- Askeer Award (2009) for lead female role as Marianne in The Art of Sweeping Things Under the Rug (2009), directed by Desislava Shpatova.
- Third prize at the National Festival of Small Theatrical Forms in Vratza, Bulgaria for lead female actress in The Art of Sweeping Things Under the Rug (2009), directed by Desislava Shpatova.
- IKAR Theatre awards (2009) nomination for best supporting actress for the role of Marianne in The Art of Sweeping Things Under the Rug (2009), directed by Desislava Shpatova.
