= Cape Fear (1962 film) =

Psychological horror thriller film

- Film poster
- Directed by: J. Lee Thompson
- Screenplay by: James R. Webb
- Based on: The Executioners by John D. MacDonald
- Produced by: Sy Bartlett
- Starring: Gregory Peck; Robert Mitchum; Polly Bergen; Lori Martin; Martin Balsam; Jack Kruschen; Telly Savalas; Barrie Chase
- Cinematography: Sam Leavitt
- Edited by: George Tomasini
- Music by: Bernard Herrmann
- Production companies: Melville Productions; Talbot Productions
- Distributed by: Universal-International
- Release date: June 15, 1962
- Running time: 106 minutes
- Country: United States
- Language: English
- Box office: $1.8 million (US/Canada)

Cape Fear is a 1962 American southern gothic psychological thriller film directed by J. Lee Thompson, from a screenplay by James R. Webb, adapting the 1957 novel The Executioners by John D. MacDonald. It stars Gregory Peck as Sam Bowden, an attorney and family man who is stalked by a violent psychopath and ex-con named Max Cady (played by Robert Mitchum), who is bent on revenge for Bowden's role in his conviction eight years prior. The film co-stars Polly Bergen and features Lori Martin, Martin Balsam, Jack Kruschen, Telly Savalas, and Barrie Chase in supporting roles.

Produced by Peck's company Melville Productions and distributed by Universal Pictures, the film includes several key cast and crew who had previously worked with director Alfred Hitchcock, including editor George Tomasini and composer Bernard Herrmann. J. Lee Thompson's direction was also strongly influenced by Hitchcock.

The film was released on June 15, 1962. It received positive reviews from critics, who highlighted Peck and Mitchum's performances. A remake of the same name was released in 1991, directed by Martin Scorsese and starring Nick Nolte and Robert De Niro in the lead roles. Peck, Mitchum, and Balsam all appeared as different characters in the remake.

== Plot ==
In Southeast Georgia, Max Cady is released from prison after serving an eight-year sentence for rape. He promptly tracks down Sam Bowden, an attorney whom he holds personally responsible for his conviction because Bowden interrupted his attack and testified against him. Cady begins to stalk and subtly threaten Bowden’s family, including his wife, Peggy, and 14-year-old daughter, Nancy. He kills the family dog, though Bowden cannot prove that Cady did it. Police chief Mark Dutton has his officers harass Cady, but when Cady retains an attorney and threatens to sue the department, he tells Bowden that nothing more can be done without proof of a crime.

Bowden hires private investigator Charlie Sievers, who tracks down a girl named Diane Taylor whom Cady had raped and beaten. Fearing public humiliation, Taylor refuses Bowden's plea to file charges against Cady and skips town. While Nancy is waiting in a car one day, Cady appears and frightens her; Nancy runs into traffic and is nearly killed. After failing to bribe Cady to leave town, Bowden hires three men to beat Cady, but the latter turns the tables and forces one of the men to confess Bowden's actions to the police. Cady's attorney has Bowden's law license suspended and applies to have him disbarred.

Fearing for Peggy's and Nancy's safety, Bowden takes them to their houseboat and cabin in the Cape Fear region of North Carolina. He then pretends to fly to Atlanta for his disbarment hearing, while Sievers lures Cady to the boat where Bowden is waiting in secret with a gun and a county deputy, Kersek. Cady sneaks undetected onto the riverbed and drowns Kersek. Eluding Bowden and setting the houseboat adrift down the current, Cady assaults Peggy and draws Bowden in to save her before jumping ashore to rape Nancy. Bowden realizes what has happened and also swims ashore.

The two men engage in a final fight on the riverbank. Bowden manages to retrieve his gun, which he had dropped, and shoots Cady, wounding and incapacitating him. Cady tells Bowden to “go ahead” and kill him, but Bowden decides to do what Cady earlier told him would be unbearable — put him in prison for the rest of his life, to “count the years, the months, the hours until the day you rot.” In the morning light, the Bowden family are together on a boat, heading safely downriver with police.

== Cast ==
- Gregory Peck as Sam Bowden
- Robert Mitchum as Max Cady
- Polly Bergen as Peggy Bowden
- Lori Martin as Nancy Bowden
- Martin Balsam as Mark Dutton
- Jack Kruschen as Dave Grafton
- Telly Savalas as Charlie Sievers
- Barrie Chase as Diane Taylor
- Paul Comi as Garner
- Page Slattery as Deputy Kersek
- Will Wright as Dr. Pearsell

== Production ==
=== Development ===
Cornel Wilde acquired the rights to John D. MacDonald's novel The Executioners for $30,000 in 1958. Gregory Peck had his own production company, Melville Productions, in partnership with Sy Bartlett, which had made The Big Country and Pork Chop Hill and they later purchased the rights. They planned to make it after The Guns of Navarone. Peck was impressed by J. Lee Thompson's work on that film and hired him for Cape Fear. Peck said his goal was to make "first class professional entertainment intelligently done." He was responsible for the title of the film, as he found the novel title "kind of a turn-off" and happened to find the Cape Fear region when looking for Atlantic coast locations.

=== Casting ===
Telly Savalas was screen tested for the role, but later played private eye Charlie Sievers. Robert Mitchum refused to play Max Cady when he was first offered the part, but eventually accepted it after Peck and Thompson delivered him flowers and a case of bourbon.

Thompson wanted Hayley Mills, whom he had cast in Tiger Bay, to play the daughter, but Mills was unavailable.

Polly Bergen signed in December 1960. It was her first film in eight years.

In addition, Edward Platt, the future "Chief" on the television series Get Smart, and November 1958 Playboy Playmate centerfold Joan Staley make brief appearances as a judge and a waitress, respectively.

=== Filming ===
Principal photography of Cape Fear began on April 6 and ended in June 1961. Thompson envisioned the film in black and white, believing that shooting the film in color would lessen the atmosphere. As an Alfred Hitchcock fan, he wanted to have Hitchcockian elements in the film, such as unusual lighting angles, an eerie musical score, closeups, and subtle hints rather than graphic depictions of the violence Cady has in mind for the family. Hitchcock collaborators Robert F. Boyle and George Tomasini served as production designer and editor, and his regular composer Bernard Herrmann wrote the score.

The outdoor scenes were filmed on location in Savannah, Georgia; Stockton, California; and the Universal Studios backlot at Universal City, California. The indoor scenes were done at Universal Studios Soundstage. Mitchum had a real-life aversion to Savannah, where as a teenager, he had been charged with vagrancy and put on a chain gang. This resulted in a number of the outdoor scenes being shot at Ladd's Marina in Stockton, including the culminating conflict on the houseboat at the end of the movie.

The scene in which Mitchum attacks Polly Bergen's character on the houseboat was almost completely improvised. Before the scene was filmed, Thompson suddenly told a crew member: "Bring me a dish of eggs!" Mitchum's rubbing the eggs on Bergen was not scripted and Bergen's reactions were real. She also suffered back injuries from being knocked around so much. She felt the impact of the "attack" for days. While filming the scene, Mitchum cut open his hand, leading Bergen to recall: "his hand was covered in blood, my back was covered in blood. We just kept going, caught up in the scene. They came over and physically stopped us."

In the source novel The Executioners, by John D. MacDonald, Cady was a soldier court-martialed and convicted on then Lieutenant Bowden's testimony for the brutal rape of a 14-year-old girl. The censors stepped in, banned the use of the word "rape", and stated that depicting Cady as a soldier reflected adversely on U.S. military personnel.

=== Music ===
Bernard Herrmann, as often in his scores, uses a reduced version of the symphony orchestra. Here, other than a 46-piece string section (slightly larger than usual for film scores), he adds four flutes (doubling on two piccolos, two alto flutes in G, and two bass flutes in C) and eight French horns. No use is made of further wind instruments or percussion.

In his 2002 book A Heart at Fire's Center: The Life and Music of Bernard Herrmann, Stephen C. Smith writes:

"Yet Herrmann was perfect for Cape Fear ... Herrmann's score reinforces Cape Fear's savagery. Mainly a synthesis of past devices, its power comes from their imaginative application and another ingenious orchestration ... a rehearsal for his similar orchestration on Hitchcock's Torn Curtain in 1966. Like similar 'psychological' Herrmann scores, dissonant string combinations suggest the workings of a killer's mind (most startlingly in a queasy device for cello and bass viols as Cadey [sic] prepares to attack the prostitute). Hermann's prelude searingly establishes the dramatic conflict: descending and ascending chromatic voices move slowly towards each other from their opposite registers, finally crossing–just as Boden and Cadey's game of cat-and-mouse will end in deadly confrontation."

== Release ==
=== Censorship ===
Although the word "rape" was entirely removed from the script before shooting, the film still enraged the censors, who worried that "there was a continuous threat of sexual assault on a child." To accept the film, British censors required extensive editing and deleting of specific scenes.

After making around 6 minutes of cuts, the film still nearly garnered a British X rating (meaning at the time, "Suitable for those aged 18 and older", not necessarily meaning there was sexually explicit or violent content). Thompson said he had to make 161 cuts; the censor argued it was fifteen main cuts but admitted they took 5 minutes. The censor said this was primarily because the film involved threat of sexual assault against a child.

=== Critical response ===
Upon its release, the film received positive but cautious feedback from critics due to the film's content.

Bosley Crowther of The New York Times praised the "tough, tight script", as well as the film's "steady and starkly sinister style." He went on to conclude his review by saying, "this is really one of those shockers that provokes disgust and regret." The entertainment-trade magazine Variety reviewed the film as "competent and visually polished", while commenting on Mitchum's performance as a "menacing omnipresence."

On the review aggregator website Rotten Tomatoes, 89% of 27 critics' reviews are positive, with an average rating of 7.8/10. The website's consensus reads: "An exemplary thriller powered by Robert Mitchum's chilling performance and Bernard Herrmann's sinister score, Cape Fear seethes with perfectly modulated tension."

=== Home media ===
Cape Fear was first made available on VHS on March 1, 1992. On May 14, 1992, it was released on laserdisc. It was later re-released on VHS, as well as DVD, on September 18, 2001. The film was released onto Blu-ray on January 8, 2013. It contains production photos and a "making-of" featurette.

== Remake ==
A remake of the same name was released in 1991, attributing both MacDonald's novel and Webb's 1962 screenplay as source material. Directed by Martin Scorsese and written by Wesley Strick, the film stars Nick Nolte as Bowden, Robert De Niro as Cady, Jessica Lange as Bowden's wife (renamed 'Leigh') and Juliette Lewis as his daughter (renamed 'Danielle').

Gregory Peck, Robert Mitchum, and Martin Balsam all make cameo appearances, and Bernard Herrmann's original score was adapted and re-orchestrated by Elmer Bernstein.

The film makes several notable changes to the story, namely by changing Sam Bowden to Cady's former defense attorney, who secretly and deliberately sabotaged his client's case to ensure a conviction. Cady dies during the film's climax, after the houseboat sinks. The remake also combines Charlie Sievers and Deputy Kersek into a single character, Claude Kersek (played by Joe Don Baker).

== Legacy ==
Although it makes no acknowledgement of Cape Fear, the episode "The Force of Evil" from the 1977 NBC television series Quinn Martin's Tales of the Unexpected uses virtually the same plot, merely introducing an additional supernatural element to the released prisoner.

The film and its remake serve as the basis for the 1993 The Simpsons episode "Cape Feare" in which Sideshow Bob, recently released from prison, stalks the Simpson family in an attempt to kill Bart. The episode, and both films, serve as inspiration for Anne Washburn's play Mr. Burns, a Post-Electric Play.

In April 2007, Newsweek selected Cady as one of the 10 best villains in cinema history. Specifically, the scene where Cady attacks Sam's family was ranked number 36 on Bravo's 100 Scariest Movie Moments in 2004.

A consumer poll on the Internet Movie Database rates Cape Fear as the 65th-best trial film, although the trial scenes are merely incidental to the plot.

The film is recognized by American Film Institute in these lists:

- 2001: AFI's 100 Years...100 Thrills – #61
- 2003: AFI's 100 Years...100 Heroes & Villains:
  - Max Cady – #28 Villain

== See also ==
- List of films featuring home invasions
- List of films featuring surveillance
- Trial movies
