= Oceanside International Film Festival =

Film festival

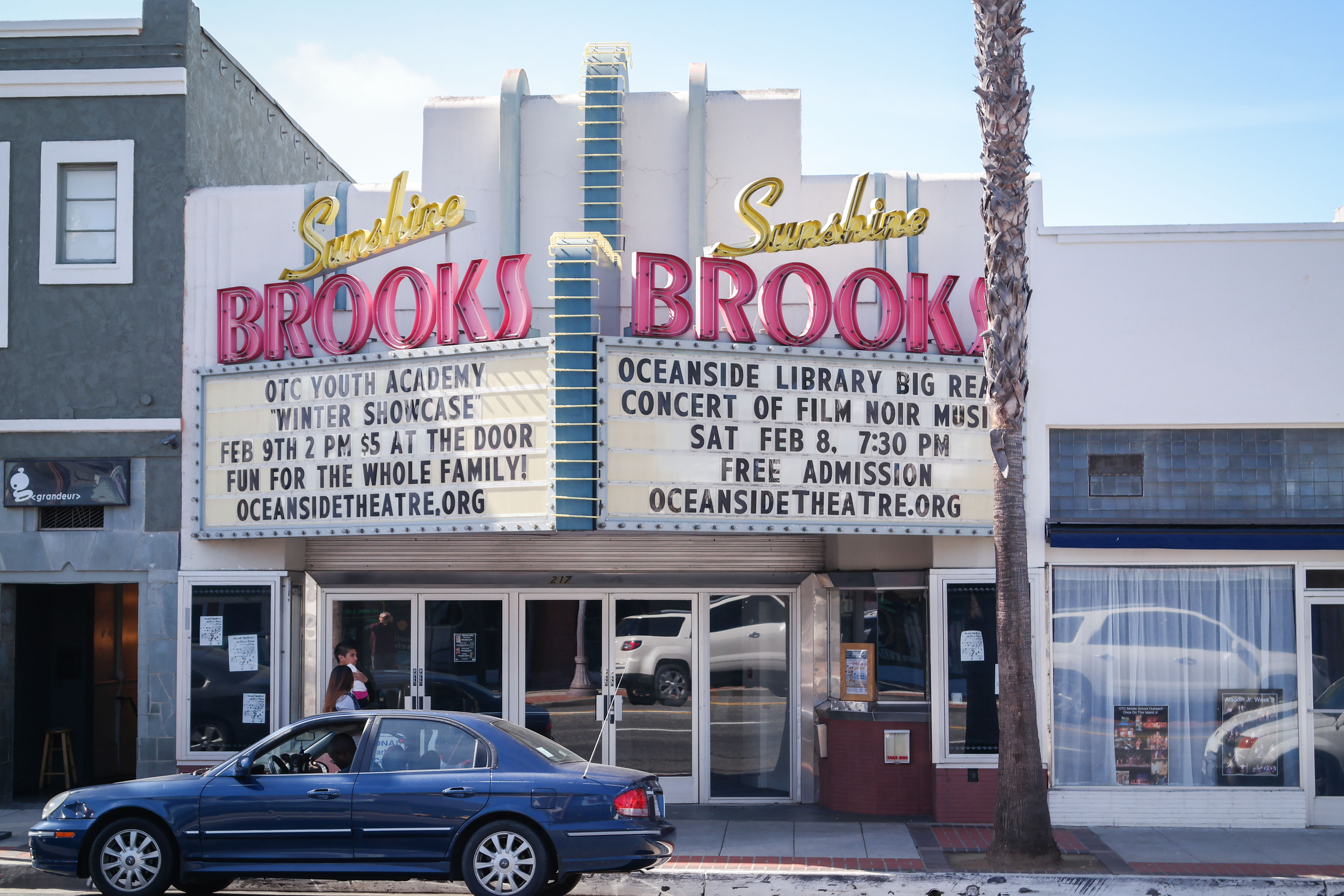
- OIFF Venue Sunshine Brooks Theater
- Location: Oceanside, California, U.S.
- Founded: 2009
- Founded by: Oceanside Cultural Foundation
- Most recent: 2025
- Directors: Lou Niles (executive); Dmitriv Demidov (co-chair)
- Artistic director: Carly Starr Brullo-Niles
- Festival date: Annually in August until 2020, annually in February since 2021
- Language: English
- Website: osidefilm.org

14th Oceanside International Film Festival chronology
- 15th Oceanside International Film Festival 13th Oceanside International Film Festival

The Oceanside International Film Festival (OIFF) is an annual film festival held in Oceanside, California. It was founded in 2009 by the Oceanside Cultural Foundation.

== History ==
The 11th annual festival was the first in person event since 2019. It ran from February 22-27, 2022. Prior to the COVID-19 pandemic, the festival was held annually in August each year. It was virtual in August 2020, followed up by a virtual "best of" festival in February 2021. This transition was to permanently move the annual festival to February.

Executive director Lou Niles curates the festival along with his wife, director Carly Starr Brullo-Niles. Dmitriv Demidov is the co-chair, Michael E. Vasquez is a committee chair member, and Sterling Anno is the co-programmer.

=== Notable appearances ===
Notable attendees include Sally Kirkland, Jon St. John, Amir George, Lee Meriwether, TJ Storm, Shawn Hatosy, Carolina Guerra, Ben Robson, Kate Bosworth, Sanoe Lake, John Stockwell, Taylor Steele, Tony Alva, Joanna Cassidy, Taryn Manning and The Silent Comedy.

=== Notable films and television ===
Year	Title	Director(s)	Notes
2015	Attack of the Killer Tomatoes	Costa Dillon	
2017	The Black Ghiandola	Sam Raimi, Catherine Hardwicke, Theodore Melfi	Short film
2018	Jackpot	Shawn Hatosy	TV episode 11 premiere of Animal Kingdom season 3
2018	Daisy Belle	William Wall	Short film
2020	Friend of the World	Brian Patrick Butler	Premiere
2020	The Power Agent	Mark Atkinson	Best Actress nomination for Charlie Krapf, short film
2022	Blue Crush	John Stockwell	Opening film
2022	Pulp Friction	Mark Atkinson, Tony Olmos	Best Supporting Actor nomination for Elliott Branch Jr., short film
2023	Touch	Justin Burquist	Best Art Direction nomination, short film
2024	Thinner	Tom Holland	Special screening
2024	Hemet, or the Landlady Don't Drink Tea	Tony Olmos	Closing film, multiple nominations

== Achievement in Film Award ==
- 2018: Jarod Bainbridge and Allyssa Bainbridge

== Artist Spotlight Award ==
- 2025: Surfer on the Jetty by Tom Smith

== Emerging Filmmaker Award ==
- 2019: Eleri Edwards for The Goat
- 2020: Yutao Chen for Dirty Business and Cameron Penn for The Roommates
- 2025: James Valdez for Canta Santiago

== Emerging Student Scholarship Award ==
- 2019: Laura Nguyen for Hazel

== Inspiring Student Scholarship Award ==
- 2019: David Pradel for The City's Champions

== Lifetime Achievement Award ==
- 2012: William T. Stromberg and Everett Peck
- 2013: Sally Kirkland and Jon St. John
- 2014: Saginaw Grant
- 2015: John DeBello
- 2016: Kathleen Quinlan and Rolly Crump
- 2017: Alan Roderick-Jones
- 2019: Taylor Steele

== Oceanside Awareness Award ==
- 2015: Stacy Goldberg

== Oceanside Impact Award ==
- 2022: John Stockwell, Kate Bosworth, Sanoe Lake, Jessica Trent
- 2023: Taryn Manning
- 2025: Taylor Lane

== Oceanside On Screen Award ==
- 2018: Shawn Hatosy
- 2019: Tony Alva

== Oceanside Spotlight Contest ==
- 2013: KMR Video Services Oceanside CA Promo by Sam Mattson
- 2016: Waves N' Craves: Baked Eggs & Spiralized Sweet Potato by Missy Powers
- 2017: Waves N Craves: The Yummus Episode by Missy Powers

== Best Picture ==
- 2009: Callous
- 2012: Working Class by Jeff Durkin
  - Washed Up by Mark Richardson (Audience Choice)
- 2013: Patrol Base Jaker by David Scantling
  - Broken Knuckles by Justin Burquist (Audience Choice)
- 2014: Into the Silent Sea by Andrej Landin
  - West by Jesse Weseloh (Audience Choice)
- 2015: Keep in Touch by Sam Kretchmar
  - The Age of Reason by Andrew Schrader (Audience Choice)
- 2016: The Whimsical Imagineer
  - We Can't Die (Audience Choice)
- 2017: Hush by Michael Lewis Foster
  - Our Barrio by Ryan Casselman (Audience Choice)
- 2018: It's Just a Game
  - Esfuerzo (Audience Choice)
- 2019: Banana Split
- 2020: Sockeye Salmon. Red Fish
- 2022: The Ugly Truth
- 2023: The Manliest Man
- 2024: The Countryman
- 2025: The Cigarette Surfboard

== Best Actor in a Lead Role ==
- 2009: Mark Nilsson for Ballbusters
- 2019: Josh Bywater for Part 5B
- 2020: Numan Cakir for Toprak
- 2022: Juan Pablo Zamora for Mar & Cielo
- 2023: Matthew Kim for The Manliest Man
- 2024: Kyle Minshew for Accidental Stars
- 2025: Tom Holland for Last Call

== Best Actress in a Lead Role ==
- 2009: Kari Nissena for Callous
- 2019: Hannah Marks for Banana Split
- 2020: Alia Shawkat for Alina
- 2022: Caroline Hartig for The Ugly Truth
- 2023: Ling Ling for Filter
- 2024: Beth Gallagher for To Fall in Love
- 2025: Audrey Corsa for Solid

== Best Animation (Short or Feature) ==
- 2009: Perchance to Dream by Lauren Kimball
- 2012: Thumb Snatchers from the Moon Cocoon by Bradley Schaffer (also Audience Choice)
- 2015: Tick Tock by Zeynep Kocak
  - Telling a You by M.Y.R.A. Entertainment (Audience Choice)
- 2016: Sea of Ink by Chenxin Yang
- 2017: Calley MacDonald for A Boy & His Beast (also Audience Choice)
- 2018: One Small Step (also Audience Choice)
- 2019: Arna Selznick for The Most Magnificent Thing
- 2020: Acaiaca
- 2022: Crusoe
- 2023: Yellowstone 88 for Song of Fire
- 2024: Speedman
- 2025: Mutual Tides

== Best Art Direction (Short or Feature) ==
- 2019: Rocket Boy (Design)
- 2020: Elsa Mickelson for Leave 'Em Laughing (Design)
- 2022: Katelyn Moger for Never Felt Better
- 2023: Filter
- 2024: The Countryman
- 2025: Keep

== Best Cinematography in a Feature ==
- 2019: Benjamin Kasulke for Banana Split
- 2020: Steven Fadellin for Love is Not Love
- 2022: Karma Gava and Simon Davis for Gianni Berengo Gardin's Tale of Two Cities
- 2023: Chris Alstrin for The Mirage
- 2024: Justin Moore for The Buildout
- 2025: Ben Judkins for The Cigarette Surfboard

== Best Cinematography in a Short ==
- 2019: Andrew Daughters for Shaped
- 2020: Jeff Taylor for Unnur
- 2022: Johnny Agnew for Young and the Reckless
- 2023: Robert L. Hunter for Reclaim Your Water: Natasha Smith
- 2024: Jannis Schelenz for The Countryman
- 2025: Nate Allen Laverty for Creatures of Habit

== Best Direction in a Feature ==
- 2009: Joey Lanai for Callous
- 2019: Benjamin Kasulke for Banana Split
- 2020: Stephen Keep Mills for Love is Not Love
- 2022: Jeremy Pion-Berlin for Failure to Protect
- 2023: Danijela Steinfeld for Hold Me Right
- 2024: Zeshaan Younus for The Buildout
- 2025: Ben Judkins for The Cigarette Surfboard

== Best Direction in a Short ==
- 2019: Erin Martinez for Alone Together
- 2020: Rami Kodeih for Alina
- 2022: Melissa Kirkendall for You are Me & I am You
- 2023: Vivian Ip for An Island Drifts
- 2024: Emily Bennett for Accidental Stars
- 2025: Harry Holland for Last Call

== Best Editing in a Feature ==
- 2019: Chris Gentile for Self-Discovery for Social Survival
- 2020: Vladislav Grishin for Sockeye Salmon. Red Fish
- 2022: Jay Keuper and Sean Duggan for Keep It a Secret
- 2023: Peter Hamblin for Sweet Adventure
- 2024: Matt Latham for The Buildout
- 2025: Ben Judkins for The Cigarette Surfboard

== Best Editing in a Short ==
- 2019: Erin Martinez for Alone Together
- 2020: Rami Kodeih for Alina
- 2022: Alvin Reyes for Bundini
- 2023: David Abades Barclay for Salt Lines
- 2024: Allison Waid for Please Ask for It
- 2025: Carl Bengtsson for An Exam's Journey

== Best Feature Documentary ==
- 2012: Working Class by Jeff Durkin (also Audience Choice)
- 2013: Patrol Base Jaker by David Scantling
  - Finnigan's War by Conor Timmis (Audience Choice)
- 2014: Art As a Weapon by Jeff Durkin
  - Out In the Line-Up by Ian W. Thomson (Audience Choice)
- 2015: Omo Child: The River and the Bush by John Rowe
  - Breaking Point by Bill Wisneski (Audience Choice)
- 2016: The Weekend Sailor by Bernardo Arsuaga
  - It Ain't Pretty by Dayla Soul (Audience Choice)
- 2017: No Roads In by Josh Wong (also Audience Choice)
- 2018: Chris Metzler, Jeff Springer and Quinn Costello for Rodents of Unusual Size
  - Bill Wisneski for Shadow of Drought: California’s Looming Water Crisis (Audience Choice)
- 2019: Bill Wisneski for Shattered Dreams: Sex Trafficking in America
- 2020: Sockeye Salmon. Red Fish
- 2022: Failure to Protect
- 2023: Jack Has a Plan
- 2025: Call Me Mule

== Best Local Student Film ==
- 2018: Alana Nichols' Story by Eli Bensen (also Audience Choice)

== Best Narrative Feature ==
- 2012: Boy with Blue by David Liddell Thorpe (also Audience Choice)
- 2013: The Racket Boys by Brandon Willer (also Audience Choice)
- 2015: Wildlike by Frank Hall Green
  - Keep in Touch by Sam Kretchmar (Audience Choice)
- 2016: Remittance by Patrick Daly and Joel Fendelman
  - ADDicted by Dan Jenski (Audience Choice)
- 2017: American Satan by Ash Avildsen
- 2019: Banana Split by Benjamin Kasulke
- 2020: Toprak by Sevgi Hirschhäuser
- 2022: The Ugly Truth by Krishna Ashu Bhati
- 2024: The Buildout by Zeshaan Younus

== Best Narrative Short ==
- 2012: Curvas by David Galan Galindo
  - The Lucky One by Bala Balakrishnan (Audience Choice)
- 2013: Turns by Jake Barsha
  - Instant Justice by Steven Turk and Angie Baggett (Audience Choice)
- 2014: Bis Gleich by Benjamin Wolff
  - West by Jesse Weseloh (Audience Choice)
- 2015: Keeper of the Past by Marco J. Riedl
  - The Knockout Game by Benjamin Goalabré (Audience Choice)
- 2016: 3000 by Tia Tsonis
  - Poor George by Jim Harris (Audience Choice)
- 2017: Songs of Wild Animals by Mara Weber
  - Iron by L. Gabriel Gonda (Audience Choice)
- 2018: Ward Crockett for There Is No Door
  - Juan Escobedo for Marisol (Audience Choice)
- 2019: Erin Martinez for Alone Together
- 2020: Alina
- 2022: Mar & Cielo
- 2023: Black Creek Trail
- 2024: Patrimony
- 2025: Last Call

== Best Original Score (Short or Feature) ==
- 2019: Rick Charnoski and Coan Nichols for The Tony Alva Story
- 2020: Marco D'Ambrosio for Eat the Rainbow
- 2022: Seana Thompson for Rogue: The Western
- 2023: I Am Alright
- 2024: Brittany Dunton and Jake Monaco for Manō
- 2025: Linus Kallberg for An Exam's Journey

== Best Producer ==
- 2009: CHSTV for We Must Remember

== Best Screenplay (Short or Feature) ==
- 2019: Benjamin Kasulke for Banana Split
- 2020: Nora Marianna for Alina
- 2022: Krisha Ashu Bhati and Eva Habermann for The Ugly Truth
- 2023: Jim Kempton for Big Wave Guardians

== Best Screenplay (Feature) ==
- 2024: Jennifer Lane for To Fall in Love

== Best Screenplay (Short) ==
- 2024: Noah Freeman Hecht for Forget Me Again
- 2025: Lewis Rose for Keep

== Best Short Documentary ==
- 2009: Save the World by Michael T. Wood
- 2012: Angel's Reach by Al Germani
  - The American Dream of Owning a Mobile Home by Promise Yee (Audience Choice)
- 2013: Threatened: The Controversial Struggle of the Southern Sea Otter by Bill Wisneski
  - Impact by Michael Franzese (Audience Choice)
- 2014: Baykeepers by Michael J. Lutman
  - LA Miner by Thomas Wood (Audience Choice)
- 2015: Over the Coals: Santa Maria the BBQ Capitol of the World by Noah Rosenstein
  - King Corduroy by Paul Von Petrzelka (Audience Choice)
- 2016: Dead Harvest by Ray McNally
  - Aloha for Indo by Elliot Lucas (Audience Choice)
- 2017: Washed Away by Dana Nachman (also Audience Choice)
- 2018: David Fokos and Barbarella Fokos for From Haarlem to Harlem
  - Alena Ehrenbold for Tan (Audience Choice)
- 2019: Andrew Daughters for Shaped
- 2020: Unnur
- 2022: You are Me & I am You
- 2023: One Lost Many Found
- 2024: Fifth Tide
- 2025: A Letter from Antarctica

== Best Soundtrack (Short or Feature) ==
- 2025: Amazigh

== Best Student Film (Short or Feature) ==
- 2009: Kevin's Kritters: Dolphin Experience by Kevin Anderson
- 2012:
  - Water on Mars by Chase Smith
    - Expiration Date by Ryan Lagerstrom (Audience Choice)
- 2013:
  - 420 Remix by Boys & Girls Club of Oceanside at MLK Jr Middle School by David Garcia (K to Middle School)
    - Rainbow Show by Pavel Demidov (Audience Choice)
  - Shoot the Moon by Alexander Gaeta (High School to College)
    - Light Me Up by Ryan Walton and Derek Dolechek (Audience Choice)
- 2014:
  - Mr. McBob by Pierre Schantz (K to Middle School)
    - Enigma: Blackouts by Jarrod Bainbridge (Audience Choice)
  - Water by Kendall Goldberg (High School, also Audience Choice)
  - Into the Silent Sea by Andrej Landin (College)
    - Flux: Redefining Women's Surfing by Chad King and Mia Montanile (Audience Choice)
- 2015:
  - Save the Date by Jarrod Bainbridge (K to Middle School)
    - The Sad Snowman by Pierre Schantz (Audience Choice)
  - Two and a Quarter Minutes by Joshua Ovalle (High School)
    - A Stacked Deck by Cameron Penn (Audience Choice)
  - Somos Amigos by Carlos Solano Perez (College)
    - Inner Peace by Ryan LaPine (Audience Choice)
- 2016:
  - Cricket by Alyssa Bainbridge (K to Middle School)
  - Jewish Blind Date by Anaëlle Morf (College)
  - Seventy-Two by Cameron Penn (Audience Choice)
- 2017:
  - Temple of the Ghost Owl by Justin Myhre (High School)
  - Pearl by Assia Qianhang Shao (College)
  - That Your Body is for Receiving Happiness and Good Stuff by Anna Blum (Audience Choice)
- 2018:
  - Stuart Heinlen for White Lines
    - Erin Martinez for Surface (Audience Choice)
- 2019: Erin Martinez for Alone Together
- 2020: Dirty Business
- 2022: Vlada Goes to London
- 2023: An Island Drifts
- 2024: El Halcón
- 2025: Canta Santiago

== Best Supporting Actor ==
- 2019: Luke Spencer Roberts for Banana Split
- 2020: Martin Kove for The Roommates
- 2022: Anthony Candell for Human Resources
- 2023: James Shanklin for Publish or Perish
- 2024: Jack Forcinito for The Countryman
- 2025: Robert John Burke for The Last Take

== Best Supporting Actress ==
- 2019: Addison Riecke for Banana Split
- 2020: Whitney Bensfield for Midnight
- 2022: Suzana Norberg for We All Die Alone
- 2023: Hili Golan for You & I
- 2024: Windy Marshall for And Yet They Speak
- 2025: Kate Hackett for Ambush at St. Mary's
