= Not Monsters =

- Author: Pamela D. Schultz
- Publisher: Rowman
- Publication date: 2005
- Pages: 248
- ISBN: 978-0742530584

Not Monsters: Analyzing the Stories of Child Molesters is a book by American psychologist Pamela D. Schultz.

== Content ==
The book is based on research Schultz conducted during a five-year period (from 1995 to 2000) with people incarcerated for child sex crimes. The research was mainly composed by audio-recorded, in-person interviews. She concluded from her data that American popular media has perpetuated false narratives related to the topic of child sex offenders.

Respondents offered a number of reasons why they committed their crimes. One man stated that he had exposed himself to a teenager in order to deliberately ruin his life, after he felt that he was about to lose his wife and career. Another man, who had engaged in oral sex with a 13-year-old boy, stated that he had been counseled during probation by the man who had previously molested him when he was an altar boy.

== Reception ==
A review on Criminal Justice Review stated that "The book does an excellent job of attempting to answer the question of why some individuals molest children." It stated that "Although this book is replete with very compelling stories, it also provides insights on sex offender treatment and sex offender notification laws."

== See also ==
- Protecting Our Kids?
- The Shaming of Sexual Offenders
- The Stains of Imprisonment
- Sexual Predators
- Sex Offenders, Stigma, and Social Control
