= Sex Offenders, Stigma, and Social Control =

Book 2016

- Author: Diana Rickard
- Publisher: Rutgers University Press
- Publication date: 2016
- Pages: 216
- ISBN: 978-0813578293

Sex Offenders, Stigma, and Social Control is a 2016 book by sociology professor Diana Rickard.

== Content ==
The book follows the stories of six freed sex offenders and their experiences with the American criminal justice system. It is mainly centered on how the sex offender label has impacted their lives after release, and the impact of non-rehabilitative, expansive sex offender policies in the United States.

Topics discussed in the book include the relationship between disproportional criminal sentences and community reintegration, legislation based on moral panics, the history leading up to the offenses of each of the book's subjects, and the shortcomings of sex offender notification and registration laws in the United States. The book argues in favor of repealing sex offender registration laws, which, Rickard states, are ineffective. The qualitative data for the study was obtained through in-person interviews.

== Reception ==
A review on Criminal Justice Review stated that the book "effectively outlines how correctional policy impacts real people" and that it "would be an ideal text for offender counseling classes".

== See also ==
- Protecting Our Kids?
- The Shaming of Sexual Offenders
- The Stains of Imprisonment
- Failure to Protect
- Reconsidering Sex Crimes and Offenders
- Sexual Predators
