= Failure to Protect =

- Author: Eric S. Janus
- Publisher: Cornell University Press
- Publication date: 2006
- Pages: 200
- ISBN: 978-0801443787

Failure to Protect: America’s Sexual Predator Laws and the Rise of the Preventive State is a 2006 book by American jurist Eric S. Janus.

== Content ==
The book mainly centers on Janus' criticism of United States sexual offender laws. He argues that American civil commitment laws have been employed by legislators and state officials, with the approval of criminal courts, as a way to circumvent sex offenders' constitutional rights. According to Janus, sex offenders have been illegally moved to a reduced-rights category that had previously been used to strip sexual and racial minorities and disabled people of their rights.

Janus wrote that although sex offender registration laws in the United States may have been written under good intentions, they are nonetheless ineffective. The book also includes an evaluation of the costs of sex offender civil commitments in the country, which he describes as a waste of resources.

== Reception ==
A review on Criminal Justice Review "highly recommend[ed] it" and stated that the book "is very well written and thoroughly researched and has the potential to change the way some scholars view commitment and registration statutes".

== See also ==
- Protecting Our Kids?
- The Shaming of Sexual Offenders
- The Stains of Imprisonment
- Reconsidering Sex Crimes and Offenders
- Sexual Predators
- Sex Offenders, Stigma, and Social Control
