= China's Wild West =

- Directed by: Urszula Pontikos
- Produced by: Michael Riley
- Cinematography: Urszula Pontikos
- Edited by: Maya Maffioli
- Music by: Gareth Lockrane
- Production company: Sterling Pictures
- Distributed by: Indieflix
- Release date: 2008
- Running time: 10 minutes
- Country: United Kingdom
- Language: Uyghur

China's Wild West is a 2008 British documentary directed by Urszula Pontikos.

The film follows the sisyphean efforts of a rural Uyghur community digging for jade, which is 40 times more valuable than gold, in the harsh conditions of a river bed in the remote town of Hotan in Xinjiang, western China.

The film received its world premiere at the 2009 Sundance Film Festival, and its European premiere at the 2009 One World Film Festival. The film has subsequently screened at many human rights, documentary and ethnographic international film festivals including Full Frame Documentary Film Festival, True/False Film Festival, and AFI Silverdocs.
