= Lost Bayou Ramblers =

Cajun music band from Louisiana

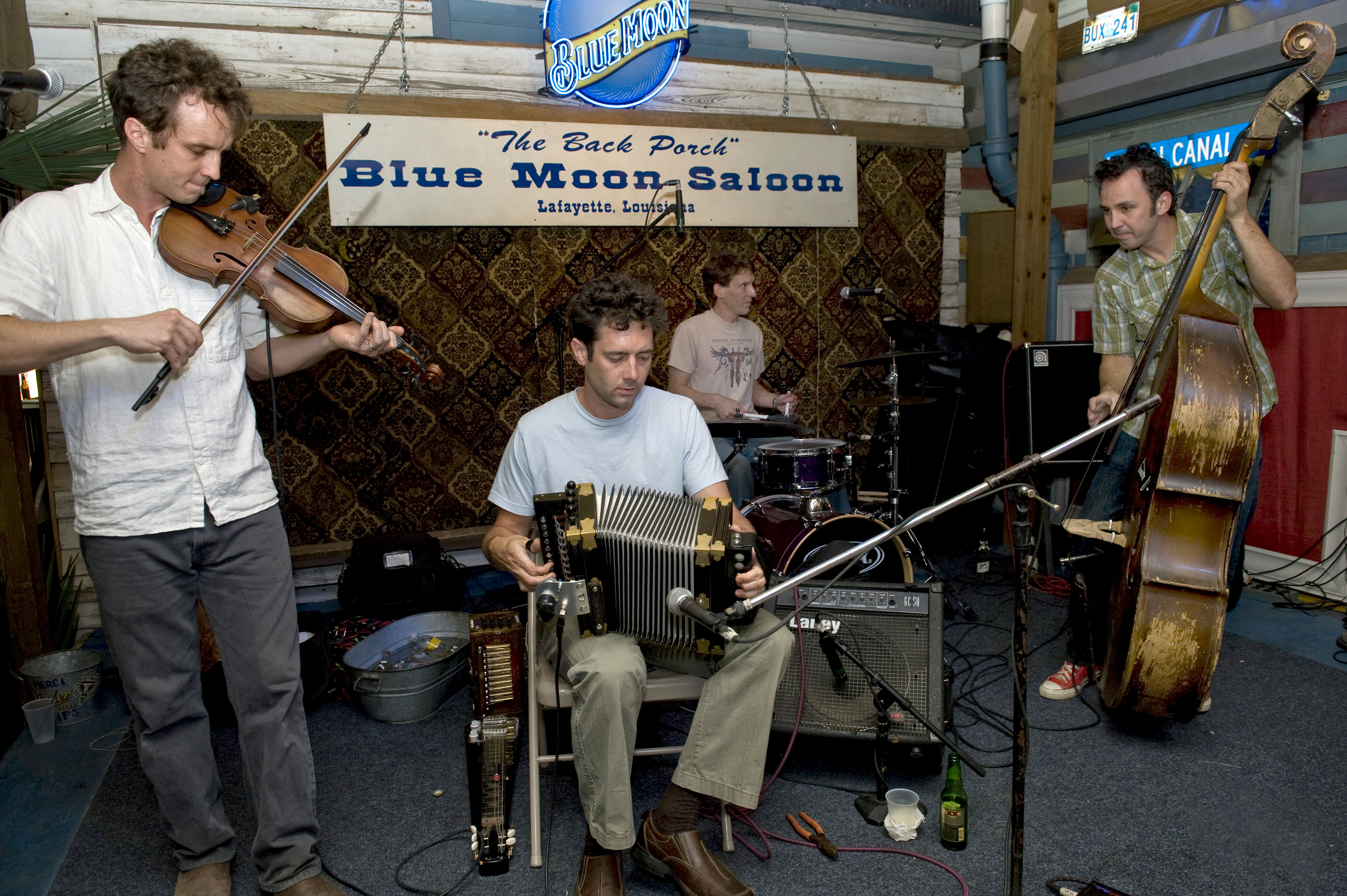
- Members playing at the Blue Moon Saloon

Background information
- Origin: Pilette, Louisiana, United States
- Genres: Cajun
- Labels: Swallow, Bayou Perdu Records
- Members: Louis Michot; Andre Michot; Kirkland Middleton; Eric Heigle; Bryan Webre; Jonny Campos
- Past members: Chris Courville; Alan LaFleur; Cavan Carruth; Paul Etheredge
- Website: http://www.lostbayouramblers.com/

Lost Bayou Ramblers is a Cajun music band from Pilette, Louisiana.

== Career ==
Lost Bayou Ramblers was born deep in South Louisiana performing old style, predominantly acoustic Cajun music at clubs and festivals across the US, Europe, and Canada. They were formed in 1999 by Louis Michot (fiddle and vocals) and his brother Andre Michot (cajun accordion and lap steel guitar) and grew to include producer Korey Richey (electric bass), Jonny Campos (electric guitar) and Eric Heigle (drums). With 15 years of touring, recording, and collaborating under their belt, the band has continually integrated new sonic elements to its live performances, always experimenting and growing the show to what it's become today, an eclectic mix of modern sounds and rhythms with ancient Cajun melodies and lyrics.

The Lost Bayou Ramblers have toured through much of the United States and Canada, including performances at the (Celebrate Brooklyn) in Brooklyn, New York, the Vancouver Folk Music Festival, the New Orleans Jazz & Heritage Festival and at the historic Preservation Hall. The Ramblers had their first international performance in Lyon, France in November 2004, and have since toured through France, Belgium, Holland, Germany, and Sweden. Their debut release, Pilette Breakdown (Swallow Records) received critical acclaim across North America and Europe. In 2008, the Ramblers was nominated for a Grammy Award in the Best Zydeco or Cajun Music category (a new category for that year) for their album Live: A La Blue Moon.

Lost Bayou Ramblers have also played a series of shows with Violent Femmes vocalist and fiddle player Gordon Gano and collaborated with him on Bastille, a song written by Louis Michot looking back 221 years from the Gulf Oil Spill in Louisiana to the Bastille. Lost Bayou Ramblers and Gordon Gano met at d.b.a. one night about five years ago, "we had been doing 'O Bye' from our first album (Pilette Breakdown). When we'd get to the breakdown part we'd do different songs, like this one White Stripes song and sometimes 'Blister in the Sun'. We were doin' that, and suddenly this guy climbs up on stage and he's like, 'You mind?' and I said, 'I guess not.' Enter Gordon Gano.

Gordon Gano was also featured on the Lost Bayou Ramblers' 2012 release, Mammoth Waltz, along with guest artists Scarlett Johansson and Dr. John. Besides the diverse list of guests, Mammoth Waltz was a musical breakthrough for LBR and the genre as a whole, drawing on influences from the modern soundscape beyond the genre. The result was a passport to play for audiences who may not have known Cajun music, but who appreciated Lost Bayou Ramblers for their music, not their genre. Although Mammoth Waltz is 100% in Cajun French, it acted as an invitation for all music lovers to tune in to the hypnotic Cajun rhythms Lost Bayou Ramblers have been known for since their inception in 1999.

2014 presented Lost Bayou Ramblers with the chance to play on their biggest bill to date, opening for Arcade Fire on two dates of their Reflektor tour. The invitation came after the Montreal-based band saw Lost Bayou Ramblers perform to 30,000 fans at the Montreal Jazz Festival in 2013, at a rare performance in which most of the audience understood the depth of the Cajun French lyrics which make up almost their entire repertoire. The release of the Ramblers' second live album also came in 2014, with Gasa Gasa Live, which was recorded at the club on Freret St in New Orleans, and released in September and accompanied by a tour from New York to Chicago.

== Cinematic musical work ==
In 2012 the Ramblers' embraced a musical collaboration with the film Beasts of the Southern Wild in which the band laid down the base track to "Bathtub" and other parts of the score. The film went on to win the Caméra d'Or at the Cannes Film Festival and the Grand Jury Prize at the Sundance Film Festival. Lost Bayou Ramblers have been performing the score to live screenings of the film with Wordless Music Orchestra.

The band continued to explore new ground in 2017 when singer/fiddler Louis Michot composed an all original score performed by Lost Bayou Ramblers for the independent PBS documentary Rodents of Unusual Size. The offbeat environmental film takes an up-close look into a large region south of New Orleans that survived Hurricane Katrina and is now facing its latest threat-hordes of monstrous 20 pound rodents known as the nutria.

All the music that appears in the film Rodents of Unusual Size was created especially for it with Michot composing 22 pieces, 21 new originals, primarily instrumentals, while a "Cajun Bounce" track was written by Bryan Webre. All selections were performed by the Lost Bayou Ramblers, and the score was engineered by Kirkland Middleton at WixMix productions in New Orleans, with additional engineering by Mark Bingham at Nina Highway in Henderson, and by Tony Daigle at Electric Comoland in Lafayette, Louisiana.

"As we began to consider potential musical collaborators for the film, Lost Bayou Ramblers was always at the top of the list given their reputation for pushing boundaries," say the filmmakers Quinn Costello, Chris Metzler and Jeff Springer. "In telling a story about Louisiana we wanted the score to reflect the tradition and culture of the place, but also create its own unique soundscape as befitting a story about the invasion of these mysterious giant rodents. We went in with the desire to really experiment and create music with a distinct sound that matched the offbeat style of the film. The result was a unique soundtrack that was distinctly Cajun, but otherworldly."

The band appeared in the documentary film The American Epic Sessions (2017), directed by Bernard MacMahon. They recorded Joe Falcon and Cleoma Breaux's 1928 song "Allons à Lafayette" (the first commercial Cajun recording) on the restored first electrical sound recording system from the 1920s - the same machine that would have originally recorded the Falcon and Breaux performance. Louis Michot said: "It's such a significant part of music that it gets a place in this documentary. These artists were traveling as far as New York and Atlanta to record and interact with other musicians. They were all singing into that one same mic. It's amazing how creative people get when they put that limitation on them." They also recorded their own composition for the film Tous les Matins which was released on film's soundtrack, Music from The American Epic Sessions: Original Motion Picture Soundtrack on June 9, 2017. Louis Michot also appeared in the American Epic documentary series, relating the story of the Breaux family and performing "Jole Blon" with the grandchildren of Amédée Breaux using the very same instruments the Breaux Brothers recorded it with in 1929.

== Musical style ==
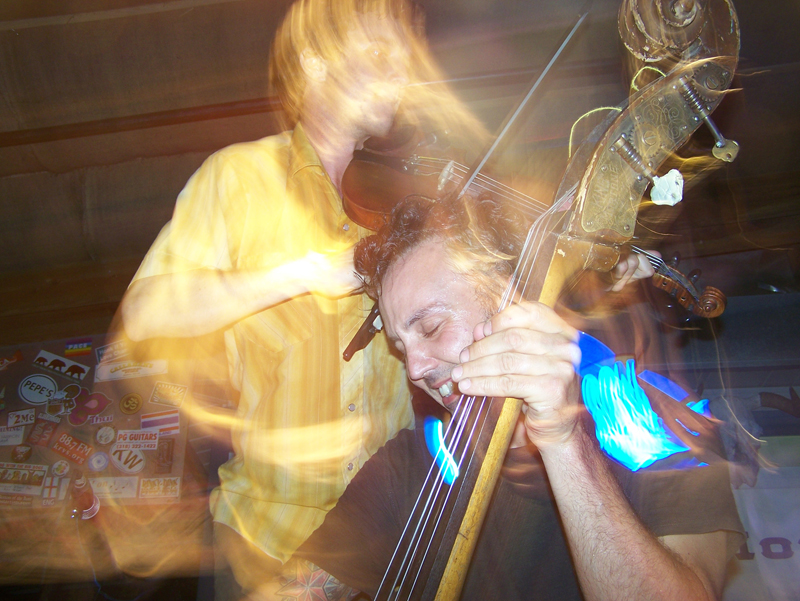
Blue Moon Saloon in Lafayette, 2008

After Mammoth Waltz drops, critics will be hard-pressed to put the Lost Bayou Ramblers in any box.

— Alison Fensterstock, The Times-Picayune (Aug 18, 2011)

The band typically plays traditional Cajun music but draws stylistically from Western swing, rockabilly, and punk rock. They have remained a traditional Cajun band, reviving forgotten classics of the genre, singing almost entirely in Cajun French, and maintaining smooth, moderate tempos suitable for dancing two-steps and waltzes. Their high energy live shows include antics more common to rock or punk bands, such as fiddler Michot climbing atop the upright bass of LaFleur as both musicians continue to play or the sporting of hipster Mohawks and prominent tattoos.

== Guest artists ==
Lost Bayou Ramblers have attracted a number of musical guests to both their live shows and their recorded albums. Their 2012 Mammoth Waltz featured cameos by Scarlett Johansson, Dr. John, Gordon Gano (Violent Femmes), Nora Arnezeder, members of Givers, and more. Gordon Gano often appears as a guest at their live shows.

== Awards and honors ==
=== Grammy Awards ===
| Year | Category | Work nominated | Result | Ref. |
|---|---|---|---|---|
| 2008 | Best Zydeco or Cajun Music Album | Live: Á La Blue Moon | Nominated | |
| 2018 | Best Regional Roots Music Album | Kalenda | Won | |
| 2024 | Best Regional Roots Music Album | Live: Orpheum Theater NOLA | Won | |

=== OffBeat's Best of The Beat Awards ===
| Year | Category | Work nominated | Result | Ref. |
|---|---|---|---|---|
| 2012 | Best Cajun Band or Performer | | Won | |
| 2012 | Best Cajun Album | Mammoth Waltz | Won | |
| 2013 | Best Cajun Band or Performer | | Won | |
| 2014 | Best Cajun Band or Performer | | Won | |
| 2014 | Best Cajun Album | Gasa Gasa Live | Won | |
| 2016 | Best Cajun Band or Performer | | Won | |
| 2017 | Best Cajun Band or Performer | | Won | |
| 2017 | Best Cajun Album | Kalenda | Won | |
| 2019 | Best Cajun Band or Performer | | Won | |
| 2020 | Best Cajun Band or Performer | | Won | |
| 2023 | Best Cajun Artist | | Won | |
| 2023 | Best Cajun Album | Live: Orpheum Theater NOLA (with Louisiana Philharmonic Orchestra) | Won | |

== Discography ==
- Pilette Breakdown (2001) Swallow Records
- Bayou Perdu (2005) Swallow Records
- Mellow Joy Boys: Une Tasse Cafe (2006) Swallow Records
- Live: A La Blue Moon (2007) Swallow Records
- Vermilionaire (2008) Bayou Perdu Records
- Bastille EP (2011) Bayou Perdu Records
- Mammoth Waltz (2012) Bayou Perdu Records
- Gasa Gasa Live (2014) Bayou Perdu Records
- Kalenda (2017) Rice Pump Records - Winner of Best Regional Roots Music Album at the 60th Annual Grammy Awards
- Rodents of Unusual Size: Music from the Motion Picture (2019), score for the film of the same name
- Asteur (2019) Lost Bayou Records
- Live: Orpheum Theater NOLA (2023) with the Louisiana Philharmonic Orchestra - Winner of Best Regional Roots Music Album at the 66th Annual Grammy Awards

=== Compilations ===
- Allons Boire un Coup: A Collection of Cajun and Creole Drinking Songs - Various artists (2006) Valcour Records
- En Francais: Cajun 'n' Creole Rock 'n' Roll Various, produced by Louis Michot of Lost Bayou Ramblers (2011) Bayou Teche Brewers/CD Baby

== See also ==
- History of Cajun music
- List of people related to Cajun music
