= 13th Oceanside International Film Festival =

2024 edition of OIFF

- Festival poster
- Opening film: California Light by Robert Denfeld
- Closing film: Hemet, or the Landlady Don't Drink Tea by Tony Olmos
- Location: Oceanside, California, United States
- Founded: 2009
- Hosted by: Oceanside International Film Festival (organization)
- Artistic director: Carly Starr Brullo Niles
- No. of films: 43
- Festival date: Opening: February 20, 2024; Closing: February 24, 2024
- Website: OIFF

Oceanside International Film Festival
- 2025 2023

The 13th Oceanside International Film Festival, is the 2024 edition of the Oceanside International Film Festival, which took place from February 20 to February 24, 2024, at Oceanside, California, United States.

Opening night featured composer Jason Hill as a guest speaker. In the weeks prior to the event, the cast and crew of Thinner reunited for a screening that was organized by the festival. Notable attendees included Tom Holland, Robert John Burke, and Joe Mantegna.

== Official selection ==
=== Feature films ===
| English title | Original title | Director(s) | Production country |
|---|---|---|---|
| The Buildout | | Zeshaan Younus | United States |
| To Fall in Love | | Michael Lewis Foster | United States |
| Hemet, or the Landlady Don't Drink Tea | | Tony Olmos | United States |
| Those Were the Good Days | | Hong-rae Lee | South Korea |

=== Short films ===
| English title | Original title | Director(s) | Production country |
|---|---|---|---|
| The Mad Doctor of the Intercontinental Hotel | | Michael Shane Bowles | United States |
| 13 Steps | | David Lawrence | United States |
| Lockdown | | Kevin Waczek | United States |
| Trailhead | | Justin Rubin | United States |
| The Climbing Perch | | Daniel Gomez Bagby | United States |
| And Yet They Speak | | Windy Marshall | United States |
| Twin Oaks | | Sean O’Connor | United States |
| Patrimony | | Stefan Tomić | Bosnia |
| El Halcón | | Arlene Torres | United States |
| The Vessel | | Brendan Garvey | United States |
| Amazing Grace | | Aiden Keltner | United States |
| The Singer: A Montford Point Marine | | Eliciana Nascimento | United States |
| Stunner | | Marianne Williams | United States |
| Accidental Stars | | Emily Bennett | United States |
| Forget Me Again | | Noah Freeman Hecht | United States |
| Burial | | Jerzy Czachowski | Poland |
| Trees and Seas | | Ross Harris | United States |
| Trees and Seas | | Beatie Wolfe | United States |
| Dust | | Ben Bloom | New Zealand |
| Rick Griffin Interlude 01, Pacific Vibrations | | Dave Tourjé | United States |
| Rick Griffin Interlude 01, Pacific Vibrations | | Steve Barilotti | United States |
| Surf Friend | | Annie Keenan Winerip | United States |
| El Gordo | | Alejandro Maytorena | Mexico |
| Fifth Tide | | Lena Kemna | Germany |
| Fifth Tide | | Christina Gindl | Germany |
| Buarcos - The Unridden Ones | | João Traveira | Portugal |
| The Pros and Cons of Killing Yourself | | Ravi Steve Khajuria | Canada |
| Heart Candies Taste Like Chalk | | Aiko Lozar | United States |
| Dream Cycle | | Don Sano | United States |
| Ask Your Friends | | Joshua Carone | United States |
| Manō | | Brittany Biggs | United States |
| A'ai | | Kalie Granier | United States |
| Los Courage Camps: Creando Olas | | Yesenia De Casas | United States |
| Spear. Spatula. Submarine. | | Shannon Morrall | United States |
| Please Ask for It | | Allison Waid | United States |
| Angeles | | Hannah Fay Folingo | United States |
| Angeles | | Alexis Grace Adams | United States |
| Figment | | Lieke Anna Haertjens | Netherlands |
| Lost Fawn | | Jasper Poore | United States |
| Lost Fawn | | Grant Davidson | United States |
| Wild | | Nicolas Devienne | France |
| The Countryman | | Andy Kastelic | United States |
| Speedman | | Joe Bowers | United States |
| California Light | | Robert Denfeld | United States |

== Awards ==
- Best Art Direction (Short or Feature): The Countryman, United States
- Best Original Score (Short or Feature): Brittany Dunton and Jake Monaco, Manō, United States
- Best Editing in a Short: Allison Waid, Please Ask for It, United States
- Best Editing in a Feature: Matt Latham, The Buildout, United States
- Best Screenplay (Feature): Jennifer Lane, To Fall in Love, United States
- Best Screenplay (Short): Noah Freeman Hecht, Forget Me Again, United States
- Best Cinematography in a Short: Jannis Schelenz, The Countryman, United States
- Best Cinematography in a Feature: Justin Moore, The Buildout, United States
- Best Supporting Actress: Windy Marshall, And Yet They Speak, United States
- Best Supporting Actor: Jack Forcinito, The Countryman, United States
- Best Actress in a Lead Role: Beth Gallagher, To Fall in Love, United States
- Best Actor in a Lead Role: Kyle Minshew, Accidental Stars, United States
- Best Direction in a Short: Emily Bennett, Accidental Stars, United States
- Best Direction in a Feature: Zeshaan Younus, The Buildout, United States
- Best Student Film (Short or Feature): El Halcón, United States
- Best Animation (Short or Feature): Speedman, United States
- Best Short Documentary: Fifth Tide, Germany
- Best Narrative Short: Patrimony, Bosnia
- Best Narrative Feature: The Buildout, United States
- Best Picture of OIFF 2024 (Short or Feature): The Countryman, United States
