= Beth Gallagher =

American actress

- Education: Royal Conservatoire of Scotland
- Occupation: Actress
- Years active: 2010–present
- Known for: To Fall in Love and its film adaptation
- Awards: Best Actress in a Lead Role at 13th Oceanside International Film Festival
- Website: beth-gallagher.com

Beth Gallagher is an American actress who appeared in the films Never Hike Alone (2025) and Sincerely Saul (2024). She starred in the play To Fall in Love (2017) and the 2023 film adaptation of the same name. Gallagher portrayed Amelia Earhart in a stage production and Shelley Duvall in a parody short film. She was nominated for Best Actress at the 2017 GI Film Festival San Diego and won Best Actress in a Lead Role at the 13th Oceanside International Film Festival in 2024.

== Personal life ==
Gallagher graduated from Royal Conservatoire of Scotland with a Masters in Acting. She studied the Meisner and Chekhov techniques.

== Career ==
In 2010, Gallagher played Agnes in a production of Anita Bryant Died for Your Sins at Diversionary Theatre in San Diego, California. In 2015, she co-starred with Whitney Shay and Alexandra Slade in a University of California, San Diego production called San Diego, I Love You 3.0. In 2016, she portrayed Amelia Earhart in Amelia Lives, a production at American History Theater.

Gallagher co-starred as Merryn in To Fall in Love by Jennifer Lane, which debuted at the 2017 San Diego International Fringe Festival. She reprised her role in a Pacific Beach production that same year, at the 2019 Edinburgh Fringe Festival, a 2018 film by Michael Lewis Foster and the 2023 remake.

In 2022, Gallagher was cast in a three-person zoom play called Three Years and 18 Months.

== Stage credits ==
Year	Title	Role	Location	Notes
2010	Anita Bryant Died For Your Sins	Agnes	Diversionary Theatre	Directed by Shana Wride
2012	Barefoot in the Park	Corie Bratter	Patio Playhouse, Escondido, California	
2012	Fat Pig	Jeannie	Patio Playhouse, Escondido, California	
2012	Hipsters: Moving Arts’ Car Plays	Chick	Without Walls Festival, La Jolla Playhouse	Directed by Michael Schwartz
2013	The Car Plays: Interchange	Mary	Without Walls Festival, La Jolla Playhouse	Directed by Michael Schwartz
2014	Gruesome Playground Injuries	Kayleen	Max Fischer Players	Directed by Michael Schwartz
2015	Disappearing Act	Emma	InnerMission Theatre	
2016	When the Rain Stops Falling	Elizabeth Law	Cygnet Theatre	Directed by Rob Lutfy
2016	A Christmas Carol	Various	Cygnet Theatre	
2016	Amelia Lives	Amelia Earhart	American History Theatre, San Diego, California	
2017	Loves and Hours	Rebecca	Scripps Ranch Theatre	
2017	Flemming: An American Thriller	Karen Flemming	Scripps Ranch Theatre	
2018	Titus Andronicus	Marcus Andronicus	Royal Conservatoire of Scotland	Directed by Gordon Barr
2018	Splendour	Genevieve	Royal Conservatoire of Scotland	Directed by Matthew Bentley
2019	To Fall In Love	Merryn Thomas	Edinburgh Fringe, Scotland	Directed by Jacole Kitchen

== Filmography ==
Year	Title	Role	Notes
2016	Slap Worthy	Girlfriend	
2017	Refuge	Beth 'Catie' Simpson	Short film with Caroline Amiguet, Aimee La Joie, Karenssa LeGear
2017	Jordan Hates the Writing	Shelley Duvall	Short film parody of The Shining
2017	Safe with Me		Short film
2018	To Fall in Love With Anyone, Do This	Merryn	
2019	In the Absence of Eden	Arianna	Short film
2021	The 5th of April	Courtney	Short film
2021	Sides	Beth	Also story credit and producer, web series, 10 episodes, directed by Michael Lewis Foster and written by Jordan Jacobo
2021	Sunken Holiday	Grace	Short film selected for Cannes Short Film Corner 2022
2023	To Fall in Love	Merryn	
2024	Sincerely Saul	Elizabeth	
2025	Never Hike Alone	Liz Holt	Also co-director, producer and co-editor; short film selected for St. Louis International Film Festival

== Accolades ==
Festival / Event	Year	Award	Title	Result	Ref.
GI Film Festival San Diego	2017	Best Actress	Refuge	Nominated	
Oceanside International Film Festival	2024	Best Actress in a Lead Role	To Fall in Love	Won	
