= I Love You, Apple, I Love You, Orange =

I Love You Apple I Love You Orange
- DVD cover
- Directed by: Horam Kim
- Written by: Horam Kim
- Produced by: Horam Kim; Lori Anne Smithey; Tae Il Kim
- Starring: Lori Anne Smithey; Horam Kim; Stefan Griswold; Victoria Blake
- Cinematography: Horam Kim
- Edited by: Horam Kim
- Music by: David R. Lorentz; Jamie Cooper (additional music)
- Release date: March 2013 (United States)
- Running time: 93 minutes
- Country: United States
- Language: English

I Love You, Apple, I Love You, Orange is a 2013 American independent romantic comedy-drama film by Horam Kim. It stars Kim, Lori Anne Smithey, Stefan Griswold, and Victoria Blake, and follows a lonely young woman who has to deal with a budding romance and the talking food in her life. The film combines live action with stop motion animation and is considered part of the mumblecore movement.

The film premiered in New York and screened at various film festivals in the United States. In 2014 it became available on DVD via Amazon.com and for instant streaming on Indieflix. In 2015 it was made available for streaming on Amazon.com.

== Synopsis ==
Maggie (Smithey) lives alone and spends her days writing lists and talking to fruits and vegetables that have come to life. The arrival of Martin (Kim), via a blind date set up by Maggie's mother (Blake), sparks a romantic relationship that threatens the routine and quiet order of Maggie's daily life as she labors to keep Martin from discovering her inner world.

== Cast ==
- Lori Anne Smithey as Maggie
- Horam Kim as Martin
- Stefan Griswold as Orange
- Victoria Blake as Maggie's mother

== Production ==
The film took eight years to complete. With no budget to speak of, Kim relied on a DIY approach. His no-frills attitude toward production was shaped in part by the Dogme 95 movement. Kim worked on the film while managing a full-time job. Inspiration for I Love You, Apple, I Love You, Orange was drawn from a variety of sources including, Mark Haddon's novel The Curious Incident of the Dog in the Night-Time, Kristen Kosmas's play The Mayor of Baltimore, and the films The Hole, What Time Is It There?, Alice, The Sweet Hereafter, Punch-Drunk Love, and Brief Encounter. Real foods were used as stop-animated characters. A single ham, playing a major role, was used during the entire year and a half of production. After six months, it became increasingly difficult to physically maneuver and handle the ham for animating purposes due to its awful smell.

== Critical reception ==
The film has received praise from critics. David Schmader of The Stranger called the movie, "a slow, scary, and surprising romance, anchored by a tough, vanity-free performance by Lori Anne Smithey." And critic Sean Kilpatrick lauded it in Hobart, calling the film, "a little poem."

I Love You, Apple, I Love You, Orange won the Bullet Award at the 2013 Columbia Gorge International Film Festival.
