= Diana Rickard =

Diana Rickard may refer to:

- Diana Rickard (swimmer)
- Diana Rickard (sociologist)
