= Hush (2016 short film) =

2016 horror film by Michael Lewis Foster

- Poster
- Directed by: Michael Lewis Foster
- Written by: Michael Lewis Foster
- Produced by: Eric Casalini; Michael Lewis Foster; Ghadir Mounib
- Starring: Rachel Barker; Luke Bedsole; Eric Casalini; Ghadir Mounib
- Cinematography: David Jester
- Edited by: Michael Lewis Foster
- Music by: Alex E. McDaniel
- Production company: Slanted View Pictures
- Distributed by: Seed&Spark; Bloody Disgusting
- Release date: March 20, 2016
- Running time: 26 minutes
- Country: United States
- Language: English
- Budget: $10,000

Hush is a 2016 horror drama short film written and directed by Michael Lewis Foster. The film stars Rachel Barker, Luke Bedsole, Eric Casalini and Ghadir Mounib. It screened at San Diego International Film Festival and Catalina Film Festival and won awards at Oceanside International Film Festival and Horrible Imaginings Film Festival. The film was distributed by Seed&Spark and Bloody Disgusting.

== Plot ==
Sadie is trying her best to be Caleb’s mother, but he makes life impossible to raise a child.

== Cast ==
- Rachel Barker as Sadie
- Luke Bedsole as Caleb
- Eric Casalini as J.J. McQuade
- Ghadir Mounib as J. Braddock

== Production ==
The film was made in San Diego and directed by Michael Foster. In an interview at MovieMaker Magazine, Foster claimed to have drawn inspiration for Hush from the 2012 Aurora, Colorado shooting.

== Release ==
Hush premiered at the San Diego International Film Festival. It later screened as part of the New York No Limits Film Series, Catalina Film Festival, Chicago Horror Film Festival, NewFilmmakers LA, Hollywood Just 4 Shorts and was distributed by Seed&Spark and Bloody Disgusting. It screened virtually at Oceanside International Film Festival’s Ten Year Reprise in 2021 as part of the festival’s best films of 2017.

== Reception ==
Hush was featured among a panel of filmmakers at the premiere of Our Barrio, an event hosted by the IntelleXual Podcast at the Museum of Photographic Arts. Foster later represented the film at a panel for San Diego Comic-Con. The film was recommended by KPBS’ Cinema Junkie at Horrible Imaginings Film Festival.

=== Critical response ===
Film critic Scott Marks at San Diego Reader calls the film a "dark, beautifully made, and brutally honest bouncing-baby short." Timothy Rawles at San Diego Gay and Lesbian News said the “structure of the story is put together with many uncomfortable and unexpected solutions.”

=== Accolades ===
Festival	Year	Award	Recipient(s)	Result	Ref.
HorrorHaus Film Festival	2017	Best Actress	Rachel Barker	Won	
HorrorHaus Film Festival	2017	Best Young Actor	Luke Bedsole	Won	
Nightmares Film Festival	2017	Best Actress Short	Rachel Barker	Nominated	
Nightmares Film Festival	2017	Best Actor Short	Luke Bedsole	Nominated	
Oceanside International Film Festival	2017	Best Picture	Michael Foster	Won	
Horrible Imaginings Film Festival	2017	Best San Diego Film	Hush	Won	
Best Shorts Competition	2016	Award of Recognition – Film Short	Michael Foster	Won	
