= Reconsidering Sex Crimes and Offenders =

- Author: Lisa A. Zilney; Laura J. Zilney
- Publisher: Praeger
- Publication date: 2009
- Pages: 188
- ISBN: 978-0313348570

Reconsidering Sex Crimes and Offenders: Prosecution or Persecution? is a 2009 book by sexologist Laura Zilney and Montclair State University criminology professor Lisa Zilney.

== Content ==
Throughout the book, the authors critically examine the nature of sexual crimes, sex offender legislation, and the lives of sexual offenders. It follows the evolution of what is perceived as sexual deviance, a concept originally based on Christian religion later validated by old medical literature.

The book explores a number of sexual activities, such as homosexuality and masochism, that were previously classified as pathological by the Diagnostic and Statistical Manual of Mental Disorders, before being considered normal in contemporary society. Other topics addresses include the many different types of sexual offenders, the history of sexual offender laws in the United States, and the results of media vigilantism, such as the suicide of a Texas attorney following due to Dateline's To Catch a Predator.

== Reception ==
A review on Sex Roles stated that "Perhaps one of the biggest strengths of the book, though, is the humanizing lens through which it views these men (and women and youth) [...] who have [...] come in contact with the law".

== See also ==
- Protecting Our Kids?
- The Shaming of Sexual Offenders
- The Stains of Imprisonment
- Sexual Predators
- Sex Offenders, Stigma, and Social Control
