= Rodents of unusual size =

Rodents of unusual size may refer to:

- mythical creatures that live in the Fire Swamp, found in the novel The Princess Bride.
- Rodents of Unusual Size, a 2017 documentary film directed by Quinn Costello, Chris Metzler, and Jeff Springer.
