= Our Barrio =

2016 film by Ryan Casselman

- Poster
- Directed by: Ryan Casselman
- Written by: Yvette Angulo; Ryan Casselman
- Produced by: Yvette Angulo; Ryan Casselman
- Starring: Yvette Angulo; Rick Mancia; Francisco Javier Gomez; Andrea Sevilla; Robby Perez
- Cinematography: Jesse Aragon
- Edited by: Ryan Casselman
- Music by: Erick Del Aguila
- Production company: A Focus Group
- Distributed by: Indieflix
- Release date: November 3, 2016
- Running time: 29 minutes
- Country: United States
- Language: English

Our Barrio is a 2016 drama short film directed by Ryan Casselman and written by Casselman and Yvette Angulo. The film stars Angulo, Rick Mancia, Francisco Javier Gomez, Andrea Sevilla and Robby Perez. The film screened at Palm Springs International ShortFest and won awards at Oceanside International Film Festival and Riverside International Film Festival. It was distributed by Indieflix.

== Plot ==
Gabriela is on the verge of adulthood, living with her family in a diverse neighborhood. Grappling with her own name, she must find herself when her life comes to a halt.

== Cast ==
- Yvette Angulo
- Rick Mancia
- Francisco Javier Gomez
- Andrea Sevilla
- Robby Perez

== Production ==
Principal photography took place in Barrio Logan and City Heights. Most of the cast was Latino, from San Diego County and Los Angeles. The film was made to authentically represent the Latino community, political and social climate, and diverse communities.

== Release ==
Our Barrio screened at Palm Springs International ShortFest. The film was distributed by Indieflix.

== Reception ==
=== Accolades ===
List of awards and nominations
Film Festival	Year	Award	Result	Ref.
San Diego Latino Film Festival	2017	Best Frontera Short	Won	
Oceanside International Film Festival	2017	Best Picture - Audience Choice	Won	
Riverside International Film Festival	2018	Best Short	Nominated	
Riverside International Film Festival	2018	Audience Award - Short	Won	
Borrego Springs Film Festival	2018	Best Latino Film - Panel of Judges	Won	
Borrego Springs Film Festival	2018	Best Latino Film - People's Choice	Won	
Kansas City FilmFest International	2018	Best Narrative Short	Won	
