= The Buildout =

- Official poster
- Directed by: Zeshaan Younus
- Written by: Zeshaan Younus
- Produced by: Trevor Dillon; Sailor Larocque; Nicholas Thurkettle; Zeshaan Younus
- Starring: Jenna Kanell; Hannah Alline; Natasha Halevi; Michael Sung Ho; Danielle Evon Ploeger; Ariel Barber
- Cinematography: Justin Moore
- Edited by: Matt Latham
- Distributed by: Ethos Releasing
- Release dates: February 24, 2024 (13th Oceanside International Film Festival); February 25, 2025 (VOD)
- Country: United States
- Language: English

The Buildout is a 2024 American psychological horror found footage film written and directed by Zeshaan Younus in his feature film debut. It stars Jenna Kanell, Hannah Alline, and Natasha Halevi. The film won four awards at the 13th Oceanside International Film Festival.

== Plot ==
Two women embark on a road trip through a desert where a cult resides and unexplainable events take place.

== Cast ==
- Jenna Kanell as Cameron
- Hannah Alline as Dylan
- Natasha Halevi as Cleric Kanner
- Michael Sung Ho as Cleric Barrow
- Danielle Evon Ploeger as Dakota
- Ariel Barber as Barrow's Vision

== Production ==
The project was crowdfunded and is the feature film debut of Younus. Principal photography took place over seven days in the Anza-Borrego Desert.

== Release ==
The film premiered at Oceanside International Film Festival on February 24, 2024, with later dates at Chattanooga Film Festival, Panic Fest, and a Frida Cinema screening hosted by Sean Gunn. It released on video on demand on February 25, 2025, as the inaugural release from Ethos Releasing.

== Reception ==
=== Critical response ===
On the review aggregator website Rotten Tomatoes, 85% of 13 critics' reviews are positive, with an average rating of 7/10.

Dread Central scored it 4 out of 5 saying it "is cosmic horror that lands among the stars." Bloody Disgusting said it is a 4 out of 5 that "is a stunning, genre-bending odyssey into the unknown that skillfully blends themes of mysticism, grief, and the paranormal into a film where reality and the supernatural blur." Video Librarian says it "stands strong currently as a 3.5 out of 5 star film that is a must watch for those who love independent cinema, and suspenseful tales."

=== Accolades ===
Festival / Event	Year	Award	Recipient(s)	Result
Oceanside International Film Festival	2024	Best Narrative Feature	Zeshaan Younus	Won
Oceanside International Film Festival	2024	Best Direction in a Feature	Zeshaan Younus	Won
Oceanside International Film Festival	2024	Best Screenplay (Feature)	Zeshaan Younus	Nominated
Oceanside International Film Festival	2024	Best Editing in a Feature	Matt Latham	Won
Oceanside International Film Festival	2024	Best Cinematography in a Feature	Justin Moore	Won
Oceanside International Film Festival	2024	Best Actress in a Lead Role	Hannah Alline	Nominated
