= Everyday Sunshine: The Story of Fishbone =

2010 documentary film

- Film poster
- Directed by: Lev Anderson and Chris Metzler
- Starring: John Norwood Fisher; Angelo Moore
- Narrated by: Laurence Fishburne
- Music by: Fishbone
- Distributed by: Pale Griot Film; Cinema Guild
- Release dates: June 19, 2010 (Los Angeles Film Festival); October 7, 2011 (United States)
- Running time: 107 minutes
- Country: United States
- Language: English

Everyday Sunshine: The Story of Fishbone is a 2010 American independent documentary film about the U.S. alternative rock band Fishbone. Co-produced and co-directed by Lev Anderson and Chris Metzler, and narrated by actor Laurence Fishburne, The film is listed on the 100 Best Documentaries as ranked by Rotten Tomatoes coming in at #74.

== Synopsis ==
Everyday Sunshine is a rock documentary that recounts Fishbone's near breakthrough. It chronicles the birth of the band, its highs and lows, and its influence on other bands. The film centers on the partnership between founding members Norwood Fisher and Angelo Moore, and their struggle to keep Fishbone going. Everyday Sunshine features interviews with members of the band, footage of the band performing live, and incorporates interviews with their friends and colleagues, including Les Claypool, George Clinton, Perry Farrell, Flea, Bob Forrest, Eugene Hütz, Ice-T, Branford Marsalis, Questlove, Tim Robbins, Gwen Stefani, and Mike Watt. The band's origin story is told in animated flashbacks in the visual style of Fat Albert and the Cosby Kids.

== Release ==
Everyday Sunshine had its world premiere during the 2010 Los Angeles Film Festival, on June 19, 2010, followed by a semi-acoustic performance reuniting three of Fishbone's original members Chris Dowd, Norwood Fisher, and Dirty Walt. This premiere helped mark Fishbone's 25th anniversary whose EP debuted in 1985.

After screening at SXSW and more than 150 film festivals around the world the film opened in select theaters on October 7, 2011, and continued to screen theatrically throughout the United States and Canada until the Spring of 2012.

A shorter, more historically themed version of the film aired on American Public Television's AfroPoP series hosted by stand-up comedian Wyatt Cenac, along with occasional broadcasts on the PBS TV station KQED documentary series Truly, CA.

In honor of Black History Month Everyday Sunshine: The Story of Fishbone debuted exclusively on iTunes on February 1, 2012, followed by a DVD release by the home video distributor, The Cinema Guild, on February 21, 2012.

In addition to interviews on MTV and with Tavis Smiley for promotion of the film's release the band performed on ABC's late-night talk show "Jimmy Kimmel Live!" on January 30, 2012, and Fishbone's lead singer Angelo Moore was a musical guest on "Late Night with Jimmy Fallon" on June 27, 2012.

== Reception ==
The film was critically acclaimed. At Rotten Tomatoes, the film has a 100% score, with an average rating of 7.40/10, based on 52 reviews. The website's critical consensus reads, "Everyday Sunshine: The Story of Fishbone is an entertaining, heartwarming, and balanced documentary about the influential Los Angeles band." It was Rotten Tomatoes' highest scoring movie of 2011. At Metacritic it has a weighted average score of 69 out of 100, based on 16 reviews.

The New Yorker's Ben Greenman wrote, "Perceptive, plainspoken, frequently gripping... Many bands have a might-have-been story, but few have a story that reflects such rich and paradoxical ideas." The Portland Mercury's Ned Lannamann called it "One of the best music documentaries, period."

== Interviewees featured ==
- Dallas Austin
- Les Claypool
- George Clinton
- Chris Dowd
- Norwood Fisher
- Flea
- Bob Forrest
- Eugene Hütz
- Ice-T
- Kendall Jones
- Tony Kanal
- Walter A. Kibby II
- Branford Marsalis
- Angelo Moore
- Keith Morris
- Questlove
- Tim Robbins
- Gwen Stefani
- Mike Watt
- Adrian Young
