= Protecting Our Kids? =

- Author: Emily Horowitz
- Language: English
- Publisher: Praeger
- Publication date: 2015
- Pages: 208
- ISBN: 978-1440838620

Protecting Our Kids? How Sex Offender Laws Are Failing Us is a book by American jurist Emily Horowitz.

== Contents ==
The book follows the history of sex offender laws and registration in the United States, as well as the evolution of popular views of sex offenders in American culture. Throughout it, Horowitz tells the stories of sex offenders and their family members.

Horowitz argues in the book in favor of altering sex offender laws in the United States, arguing that such laws are generally ineffective and have infringed upon constitutional rights of registrants. The book addresses topics such as child abuse legislation, the link between poverty and child abuse, child pornography, sex panics of the 1980s (including stranger danger and daycare abuse panic), and mediatic misrepresentation of criminal statistics.

== Reviews ==
A review on Journal of Youth and Adolescence stated that "Horowitz['s book] contributes to this area of study by showing the problems with the fear that dominates examining the realities of our sex offender laws." A review on Choice Reviews also recommended the book.

== See also ==
- The Shaming of Sexual Offenders
- The Stains of Imprisonment
- Failure to Protect
- Reconsidering Sex Crimes and Offenders
- Sexual Predators
