= 14th Oceanside International Film Festival =

2025 edition of OIFF

- Opening film: The Cigarette Surfboard by Ben Judkins
- Closing film: Last Call by Harry Holland
- Location: Oceanside, California, United States
- Founded: 2009
- Hosted by: Oceanside International Film Festival (organization)
- Artistic director: Carly Starr Brullo Niles
- No. of films: 43
- Festival date: Opening: February 18, 2025; Closing: February 22, 2025
- Website: OIFF

Oceanside International Film Festival
- 2026 2024

The 14th Oceanside International Film Festival, is the 2025 edition of the Oceanside International Film Festival, which took place from February 18 to February 22, 2025, at Oceanside, California, United States.

== Official selection ==
=== Feature films ===
English title	Original title	Director(s)	Production country
Call Me Mule		John McDonald	United States
The Cigarette Surfboard		Ben Judkins	United States
Foxtrot: Operation Reunification		Roberto Sierra Oregel	United States
The Shape Of Things: The Dick Brewer Story		Bob Campi	United States
Thirty On		Henry Brower, Dayna Smith	United States

=== Short films ===
English title	Original title	Director(s)	Production country
A Letter from Antarctica		Ben Herrgott	Australia
The Act of Crying		Xiayang Li	United States
Amazigh		Serra Soyupak	Turkey
Ambush at St. Mary's		Anthony Parisi	United States
An Exam's Journey		Carl Bengtsson	Sweden
Bahari Bingwa, The Turtle Protector		Samuel Wanjohi	Kenya
Beethoven's Great Great Great Great Great Grandchild		Daniel Maggio	United States
Big Waves Will Rise You		Sam Ostyn, Eva Küpper	Belgium
Canta Santiago		James Valdez	United States
Creatures of Habit		Nate Allen Laverty	Canada
Dammi		Yann Mounir Demange	United Kingdom
Eat Hot Chip & Lie		Anders Kapur	United States
How Not to Be a Climate Activist		Gabriel Diamond	United States
Intermission		Gavin Grant	United States
Jasmine		Tom Caulfield	United States
Keep		Lewis Rose	United Kingdom
Last Call		Harry Holland	United Kingdom
The Last Take		Brian Foyster	United States
Let It Kill You		David Cornue	United States
Locals Only		Taryn O’Connor	United States
Metronome		Péter Lehr Juhász	Hungary
Milimo		Kemane Bâ	Congo
Mother		Meg Shutzer, Brandon Yadegari Moreno	United States
Moving in Perfect Harmony		Reef X Applebaum	United States
Mutual Tides		Christian Gregg	United States
Ocean State of Mind		Danny Hardesty	United States
Piecht		Luka Lara Steffen	Germany
¿Qué Es Un Niño?	What Is a Boy?	Cristian Jesus Vega	United States
Reboot		Tyra Pacheco	United States
Return to Zero		Amado Stachenfeld	United States
Rick Griffin Interlude 02, Virginia City		Steve Barilotti	United States
Rolling for Rizz		David S. Dawson, Jordan Jacobo	United States
Seven Jewish Children		Omri Dayan	United Kingdom
Shaped by the Sea		Jared Jacobsen	United States
Solid		Grace Gregory	United States
Unsaid		Monique Moses	United States
Wild Sea		Tom Vetterl	Germany
Year of Bees		Tingerine	United States

== Awards ==
- Best Art Direction (Short or Feature): Keep
- Best Soundtrack (Short or Feature): Amazigh
- Best Original Score (Short or Feature): An Exam's Journey, Linus Kallberg
- Best Editing in a Short: An Exam's Journey, Carl Bengtsson
- Best Editing in a Feature: The Cigarette Surfboard, Ben Judkins
- Best Screenplay (Short): Keep, Lewis Rose
- Best Cinematography in a Short: Creatures of Habit, Nate Allen Laverty
- Best Cinematography in a Feature: The Cigarette Surfboard, Ben Judkins
- Best Supporting Actress: Ambush at St. Mary's, Kate Hackett
- Best Supporting Actor: The Last Take, Robert John Burke
- Best Actress in a Lead Role: Solid, Audrey Corsa
- Best Actor in a Lead Role: Last Call, Tom Holland
- Best Direction in a Short: Last Call, Harry Holland
- Best Direction in a Feature: The Cigarette Surfboard, Ben Judkins
- Best Student Film (Short or Feature): Canta Santiago
- Best Animation (Short or Feature): Mutual Tides
- Best Short Documentary: A Letter from Antarctica
- Best Feature Documentary: Call Me Mule
- Best Narrative Short: Last Call
- Best Picture of OIFF 2024 (Short or Feature): The Cigarette Surfboard
