= The Juvenile Sex Offender =

- Editor: Howard E. Barbaree, Stephen M. Hudson and William L. Marshall
- Publisher: The Guilford Press
- Publication date: 1993
- Pages: 329
- ISBN: 978-0898621204

The Juvenile Sex Offender is a book edited by Howard E. Barbaree, Stephen M. Hudson and William L. Marshall.
