= The Shaming of Sexual Offenders =

2007 book by Anne-Marie Mcalinden

- Author: Anne-Marie Mcalinden
- Publisher: Bloomsbury Publishing
- Publication date: 2007
- ISBN: 9781841135922

The Shaming of Sexual Offenders: Risk, Retribution and Reintegration is a book by Anne-Marie Mcalinden.

== Content ==
Throughout the book, Mcalinden mainly argues in favor of restorative justice toward people convicted of sexual crimes, which she stated is more effective than the retributive framework that has been more often imposed in English-speaking nations. The book explores the topic of community integration, based on John Braithwaite's concepts of disintegrative and reintegrative shaming.

Themes discussed in the book include circles of accountability, populist policymaking and popular views of sex offenders, sex offender registration and notification laws. It also compares American policies to those of other nations.

== Reception ==
A review on Legal Studies stated that, although the main goal of the book "is to convince the reader about the qualities of using restorative techniques, it is also valuable as a general book on sex offenders".

A review on the The Howard Journal of Criminal Justice described the book as "a thorough, comprehensive and welcome contribution to the literature on both the management of sex offender risk and restorative justice".

== See also ==
- Protecting Our Kids?
- The Stains of Imprisonment
- Failure to Protect
- Reconsidering Sex Crimes and Offenders
- Sexual Predators
