= Lou Niles =

American radio host

- Born: Louis Byron Niles
- Education: Coronado High School; San Diego City College; San Diego Mesa College; St. John's University
- Occupations: Radio personality; tour manager; executive director
- Years active: 1990–present
- Known for: 91X's Loudspeaker; In Your Neighborhood with Lou Niles
- Notable work: Oceanside International Film Festival
- Spouse: Carly Starr Brullo (m. 1998)

Louis Byron Niles is an American radio personality, tour manager and executive director of the Oceanside International Film Festival.

== Personal life ==
Niles graduated from Coronado High School in 1985. He studied political science and transferred to St. John's University after attending San Diego City College and San Diego Mesa College. While living in Venice, Los Angeles, he married Carly Starr Brullo in 1998 after they met working at a radio station together. Niles has been a resident of Oceanside, California, since 2003.

== Career ==
From 1990 to 1996, Niles hosted 91X's Loudspeaker show, succeeding Marco Collins. He was a guest presenter at the San Diego Music Awards in 1992. Niles was one of the first to airplay demo tapes from Jewel, Blink-182, P.O.D. and Steve Poltz. He was Poltz's tour manager and did a national tour with Lucy's Fur Coat.

In 1996, Niles relocated to Los Angeles to manage band labels. After returning to San Diego County, California, Niles and Brullo started Love Machine Films and he began a web series called In Your Neighborhood with Lou Niles. They help run the Oceanside International Film Festival which was founded in 2009. They have been involved since 2017 and Niles is executive director of the festival.
