= To Fall in Love (film) =

2023 American film by Michael Lewis Foster

- Poster
- Directed by: Michael Lewis Foster
- Written by: Jennifer Lane
- Based on: To Fall in Love by Jennifer Lane
- Produced by: Beth Gallagher; Ghadir Mounib; Jennifer Lane
- Starring: Beth Gallagher; Eric Casalini
- Cinematography: Ellie Ann Fenton
- Edited by: Michael Lewis Foster
- Music by: Alex E. McDaniel; Robin Wynn
- Production company: To Fall In Love
- Distributed by: Gravitas Ventures
- Release dates: October 7, 2023 (Heartland International Film Festival); October 22, 2024 (VOD)
- Running time: 87 minutes
- Country: United States
- Language: English

To Fall in Love is a 2023 American drama film written by Jennifer Lane and directed by Michael Lewis Foster. The film is adapted from a play Lane previously wrote. It stars Beth Gallagher and Eric Casalini. Lane and Gallagher won awards at the 13th Oceanside International Film Festival.

== Plot ==
In a final attempt to save their relationship, an estranged woman meets with her husband and discovers their love may not be worth salvaging.

== Cast ==
- Beth Gallagher as Merryn
- Eric Casalini as Wyatt
- Reese Lily Buell as Jacob

== Production ==
The play was performed by Gallagher and Casalini at a private residence in Pacific Beach, San Diego before it was previously adapted into a different film, also directed by Foster. The team shot the film during the COVID-19 pandemic. Foster was inspired by Rocky and Before Sunrise.

== Release ==
To Fall in Love held its world premiere at Heartland International Film Festival on October 7, 2023. It followed later that month with its west coast premiere at San Diego International Film Festival on October 19, 2023. In 2024, the film screened at the 13th Oceanside International Film Festival and Phoenix Film Festival. The film was distributed by Gravitas Ventures and was released on October 22, 2024.

== Reception ==
Accolades
Festival	Year	Award	Recipient	Result	Ref.
Oceanside International Film Festival	2024	Best Actress in a Lead Role	Beth Gallagher	Won	
Oceanside International Film Festival	2024	Best Screenplay (Feature)	Jennifer Lane	Won	
Oceanside International Film Festival	2024	Best Editing in a Feature	Michael Lewis Foster	Nominated	
Oceanside International Film Festival	2024	Best Actor in a Lead Role	Eric Casalini	Nominated	
Oceanside International Film Festival	2024	Best Cinematography in a Feature	Ellie Ann Fenton	Nominated	
Oceanside International Film Festival	2024	Best Direction in a Feature	Michael Lewis Foster	Nominated	
