= Classic Alice =

2014 American comedy-drama web series

- Genre: Comedy drama
- Created by: Kate Hackett
- Written by: Kate Hackett
- Directed by: Josh Compton; Ty Leisher
- Starring: Kate Hackett; Tony Noto; Elise Cantu; Chris O'Brien
- Country of origin: United States
- Original language: English
- No. of episodes: 96

Production
- Executive producers: Kate Hackett; Alexis Edelman
- Production locations: Los Angeles, California
- Running time: 5-7 minutes per episode

Original release
- Network: Amazon
- Release: March 4, 2014

Classic Alice is an American comedy-drama web series about a college student making decisions according to the actions of characters in classic literature. It was created by Kate Hackett and stars Kate Hackett, Tony Noto, Elise Cantu, and Chris O'Brien. It premiered on YouTube on March 4, 2014, and concluded on January 12, 2016. and was picked up by Amazon on May 19, 2017.

== Format ==
Classic Alice is divided into narrative arcs that correspond with the books main character Alice is reading, with overarching storylines and character development running throughout. The book arcs to date have centered on Crime and Punishment, Pygmalion, "The Butterfly," Macbeth, Rip van Winkle, The Wind in the Willows, A Christmas Carol, Walden, North and South, The Odyssey, Dracula, Silas Marner, and finally Persuasion.

The show began with weekly vlog-style episodes shot in Alice's bedroom; the first six episodes "...[act] as a sort of pilot for the series when watched all at once". Beginning with the second book arc, Pygmalion, vlog-style episodes on Tuesdays were followed by short reality TV-style confessional videos featuring various characters on Thursdays. In the eighth book arc, Walden, the show expanded beyond the vlog format and incorporated a larger variety of styles and settings.

== Plot ==
Classic Alice begins when college student Alice Rackham gets a bad grade because her professor does not think she is connecting emotionally with the books she is reading. She decides to start living her life according to the actions of characters in classic novels, and her film student friend Andrew makes a vlog-style documentary about it. In Crime and Punishment, Alice steals a test, but before she can turn herself in and deal with the consequences, Andrew takes responsibility for her actions and uses his father's money and influence to avoid punishment. This causes a rift between Andrew and Alice, who only lets him continue with the project when he promises to stop interfering with her actions.

In Pygmalion, Alice makes over nerdy student Ewan McBay and dates him briefly, but he quickly abandons her in his quest for power and popularity. She reacts, in "The Butterfly," by enlisting her cousin Reagan to help her date more and trying to meet men at events like a football game and speed dating. Ewan returns in Macbeth, when he uses his new social capital to oust the student government president and try to seize power himself. Alice runs against him and wins, but not before Ewan's dirty campaign tactics hurt the people she cares about. Meanwhile, Andrew's girlfriend, jealous of the time he is spending with Alice, gives him an ultimatum, and he breaks up with her rather than leave the project. Alice recovers from the stress of the election in Rip van Winkle, when she and Andrew ignore school for a week in favor of drinking and bowling. Alice has a crisis of confidence about her writing, and Andrew secretly submits one of her stories to literary magazines.

In The Wind in the Willows, Alice tries to act impetuously by briefly getting a belly button ring. She and Andrew join Reagan for a disastrous family Thanksgiving, after which Alice is injured in a car accident while out with Reagan. This makes her question the project and, after they almost kiss and she pulls away, her friendship with Andrew. She tries to continue the project on her own with A Christmas Carol, but the book causes her to reflect on her life and admit to herself that she loves Andrew. She finds out that the story Andrew submitted is being published, finally making her feel like a real writer, and at the end of the arc she tells Andrew about her feelings for him and they begin dating.

After a small hiatus during which the crew raised funds for "Books 8+", Alice and Andrew returned in Walden. Alice and the unseen cameraman, Nathan, pressure Andrew into starting the project again and they do so on a camping trip. There, they run into Marcus who explains the merits of "living off the land". Alice and Andrew then pack up and head to Andrew's parents' house, where they will stay while Alice interns at Crestview Publishing. She begins living North and South while struggling to accept Andrew's father's business models for his publishing firm. She also has trouble finding another magazine to publish more of her work. By the end, Alice is disheartened with her boyfriend's family, her writing, the publishing industry, and Andrew. During the same time, Cara and Lily are documenting their internship and experiences in Los Angeles on "Musica Mundana", a Classic Alice spinoff. They too have relationship issues, but they work their problems out by communicating. They head home to Valeton with their characteristically strong camaraderie.

With the summer ending, Alice and Andrew head back to Valeton and Alice begins to relive The Odyssey. The relationship, however, is very strained; the events of North and South have created a clear rift. They manage to get back to school, but it is unclear whether or not they have weathered the storm. Once back at school, Alice learns that the subletters who took over the apartment for the summer refuse to leave. She and Cara devise a very Odysseus-like plan to trick them out of the house: they are going to throw a huge party. At the party, Andrew lets it slip that he submitted Alice's stories to magazines using his father's name. Alice is visibly angry and uses her sexuality to coerce a fellow student, Brad, to help displace the subletters.

The girls are back in their home and Alice decides to pick up Dracula—but this time, she's not going to be the hero. She decides to play Dracula. The consequences are fairly dire: Alice loses her reputation and, to some extent, her friends. She works to repair the damage in her next book, Silas Marner, and finds that forgiveness does come - but it's a difficult road. As Alice picks up her next book, Persuasion by Jane Austen, she has even more to untangle—is this project working? is it even worth it?

== Characters ==
- Alice Rackham (Kate Hackett) has always been a good student - smart, well-mannered, perhaps a little weird. Alice grew up in a competitive home where intelligence was highly regarded and drive was intensely rewarded. As a student at prestigious Valeton University, she puts a lot of value on school and academic performance and wants to be a great writer. She has a particular affinity for Poe, the Russians, and Twain.
- Andrew Prichard (Tony Noto) is a fun guy, with a devil-may-care smile and attitude to match. He came from a well-to-do background but he isn't sure he's okay with that. Andrew isn't a bad guy, but on the surface he can sometimes seem like a jerk. He finds it easy to charm people into doing what he wants, but deep down he is passionate and driven. While his stock-market-loving father didn't approve of a "frivolous" major like filmmaking, Andrew fought long and hard to make sure it happened.
- Cara Graves (Elise Cantu) is a cool, down-to-earth chick who knows who she is and what she likes. She decided to do a double major in mathematics and music theory and really wants to apply mathematical principles to original compositions of her own. Meanwhile, she makes sure she's doing well in her classes, but she leaves ample room for fun too and frequently tries to drag Alice out with her.
- Ewan McBay (Chris O'Brien) is a nerd. He loves Dungeons and Dragons, live-action roleplaying, and any game that gives him a position of power. He also really enjoys programming. He is an engineer and writes on the Ocelot Call, the student paper.
- Nathan, Andrew's unseen intern, is an "uninvolved participant" and refuses to alter the course of the show or to appear on camera, though he does use Twitter and Instagram. He is often (though not always) the one filming.
- Reagan Starkie (Reid Cox) is Alice's party-loving cousin. She is very different from Alice, but they generally get along even if they don't entirely understand each other. Reagan attends OCCC, a community college a few hours south of Valeton, and still lives at home with her parents. She has a particularly tumultuous relationship with her mother.
- Marcus Hauers (James Brent Isaacs) is a stoner who probably shouldn't really be in Valeton. He has connections and can dispense materials very easily.
- Lily Oh is Cara's girlfriend and friends with the whole group. She is a music major at Valeton.
- Josh (Gentry White) was Alice's RA during Crime and Punishment.
- Anthony White (Brent Bailey) is a hot Valeton TA who came to Alice's free makeover session in Pygmalion.
- Beth Marmie (Joanna Sotomura) is an extremely quiet and shy Valeton student.
- Anna Knight (Robin Thorsen) is an activist and Valeton student.
- Stacey Bell (Dayeanne Hutton) is a Valeton sorority girl.
- Whitney Spaulding (Arielle Brachfeld) is a Valeton student with many jobs.
- Weird Coat Guy (David Nett) may or may not go to Valeton, but wants to hang around with the students.
- Chris Kim (Junot Lee) is a Valeton football player and a big flirt.
- The History Majors (Shanna Malcolm, Yuri Baranovsky, Caitlin King) are called in by Alice to predict Valeton's political future.
- Heather Verratti (Erin Wert) is Lily's roommate and Andrew's ex-girlfriend.
- Nathan's Best Friend (Eric Wilhite) resents the amount of time Nathan spends on Alice and Andrew's project.

== Books covered ==
- Crime and Punishment
- Pygmalion
- The Butterfly (by Hans Christian Andersen)
- Macbeth
- Rip van Winkle
- The Wind in the Willows
- A Christmas Carol
- Walden
- North and South
- The Odyssey
- Dracula
- Silas Marner
- Persuasion

== Transmedia ==
Classic Alice "...is truly a transmedia experience"; it expands its world beyond its videos by using transmedia to provide an immersive experience for fans. Characters use Twitter, Tumblr, and Facebook accounts, as well as less common social media sites that fit their individual interests, such as Goodreads and Instagram. Classic Alice also uses other transmedia to flesh out its world, including university newspaper The Ocelot Call, podcasts recorded in-world by characters about books, movies, and music, and an interactive fan literary magazine.

== Reception ==
Classic Alice has received many positive reviews from publications including GeekyNews, The Daily Dot, .Mic, WPCC, and more. Reading Rainbow called the show "smart, funny, and absolutely addictive," while Tubefilter pointed out that "the decision to spread a narrative across multiple books keeps Classic Alice fresh while still allowing it to develop its characters in the way its fans want." Hello Giggles included the show on their list of "Literary-Inspired Web Series You Should Be Watching," and it appeared on New Media Rockstars' Weekend Web Series Watch List. Hypable has commended the series' writing and calls it both "entertaining" and "original"; they "...commend the writers' decision to use a less pop culture-saturated book to start out with; it'd have been all too easy to go with a Jane Austen or a Charles Dickens.". .Mic highlighted the show as one of the shows that users should be watching.

AfterEllen has also kept an eye on the show for its positive portrayal of lesbian characters; calling the show "a charming web series" and directing its followers to both the main show and the Musica Mundana spinoff, which centered around Alice's roommate Cara.

== Awards and nominations ==
Awards and nominations for Classic Alice
| Year | Award Show | Category | Result | Recipient(s) |
|---|---|---|---|---|
| 2014 | Snobby Robot WebSeries Wednesday Awards | Screenplay (Dramatic) Nominee | Nominated | Kate Hackett |
| 2014 | Snobby Robot WebSeries Wednesday Awards | Best Actor Nominee | Nominated | Tony Noto |
| 2014 | Snobby Robot WebSeries Wednesday Awards | Best Actress Nominee | Nominated | Kate Hackett |
| 2014 | Snobby Robot WebSeries Wednesday Awards | Best Series Nominee | Nominated | Classic Alice |
| 2015 | Austin Web Fest | Official Selection | Nominated | Kate Hackett |
| 2015 | Hollyweb Festival | Official Selection | Nominated | Kate Hackett |

== External resources ==
- Official Website
- Classic Alice series on YouTube
- Classic Alice on Facebook
- Classic Alice on Twitter
- Classic Alice on Tumblr
- Classic Alice at Internet Movie Database
