= Michael Lewis Foster =

American filmmaker

- Born: Oceanside, California, U.S.
- Education: El Camino High School
- Occupation: Filmmaker
- Notable work: Hush; To Fall in Love
- Awards: 2016 Best Picture at Oceanside International Film Festival

Michael Lewis Foster is an American filmmaker who directed the film To Fall in Love (2023) and wrote and directed the short film Hush (2016). He has won awards at Horrible Imaginings Film Festival and Oceanside International Film Festival.

== Early life ==
Foster was born in Oceanside, California and attended El Camino High School. He later moved to North Hollywood, Los Angeles.

== Career ==
Foster's short film Hush was inspired by the James Holmes trial and premiered at the San Diego International Film Festival in 2016. In 2018, he directed a film called To Fall in Love With Anyone, Do This which premiered at Museum of Photographic Arts. It was remade in 2023 and premiered at Heartland International Film Festival. The film is based on a New York Times article about a couple looking to save their marriage using 36 questions and was previously a play at the San Diego International Fringe Festival.

== Filmography ==
| Year | Title | Director | Writer | Editor | Notes |
|---|---|---|---|---|---|
| 2016 | Hush | Yes | Yes | Yes | Short film, also executive producer |
| 2018 | To Fall in Love With Anyone, Do This | Yes | No | Yes | Also co-executive producer |
| 2021 | The 5th of April | Yes | No | Yes | Short film |
| 2021 | Sides | Yes | Co-story | Yes | Series, also producer and cinematographer |
| 2022 | Black Creek Trail | No | No | Yes | Short film |
| 2023 | To Fall in Love | Yes | No | Yes | |

== Accolades ==
| Festival | Year | Award | Title | Result | Ref. |
|---|---|---|---|---|---|
| Horrible Imaginings Film Festival | 2017 | Best San Diego Film | Hush | Won | |
| Oceanside International Film Festival | 2016 | Best Picture | Hush | Won | |
| Oceanside International Film Festival | 2023 | Best Editing in a Short | Black Creek Trail | Nominated | |
| Oceanside International Film Festival | 2024 | Best Direction in a Feature | To Fall in Love | Nominated | |
| Oceanside International Film Festival | 2024 | Best Editing in a Feature | To Fall in Love | Nominated | |
