= Banana Split (film) =

2018 American comedy film

- Film poster
- Directed by: Benjamin Kasulke
- Written by: Hannah Marks; Joey Power
- Produced by: Jeremy Garelick; Mickey Liddell; Pete Shilaimow; Will Phelps; Glen Trotiner; Sam Slater
- Starring: Hannah Marks; Liana Liberato; Dylan Sprouse; Luke Spencer Roberts
- Cinematography: Darin Moran
- Edited by: Brendan Walsh
- Music by: Annie Hart
- Production companies: American Indie; Burn Later Productions; LD Entertainment; American High
- Distributed by: Vertical Entertainment
- Release dates: September 22, 2018 (LA Film Festival); March 27, 2020 (United States)
- Running time: 88 minutes
- Country: United States
- Language: English

Banana Split is a 2018 American comedy film directed by Benjamin Kasulke and starring Hannah Marks (who co-wrote the screenplay), Liana Liberato and Dylan Sprouse. It is Kasulke's feature-length directorial debut. The film was released on March 27, 2020.

== Plot ==
High school friends April and Nick start dating and are together for two years, until they break up during their senior year after learning that they have applied to different colleges and would be unable to make a long distance relationship work. During the summer before college, April finds out Nick is dating someone new named Clara.

April goes to a party with her other friends, Molly and Sally, and Clara shows up at the party with Nick and April’s mutual friend, Ben. April texts Ben to meet with her to try and find out more about Clara, and then spends the rest of the party hiding in bedrooms from her until Clara finds her and introduces herself. April is surprised to discover how much she has in common with Clara, and the two end up having a great time together at the party. At the end of the night, Clara puts her phone number on April’s phone.

Clara and April start spending time together, drawn to each other by their similar tastes and attitudes. They set up rules to never talk about Nick or tell Nick about their friendship, although Ben is aware of their friendship. They become best friends and one night April invites Clara over to her home for dinner. Things go awry when April’s little sister, Agnes, who is also “obsessed” with Nick, reveals that Clara is Nick's current girlfriend to their mother, making everything awkward.

Orientation is just around the corner and Nick’s birthday arrives, prompting April to send him a message wishing him a happy birthday. This angers Clara when she finds out.

One last high school party takes place and April tries to avoid going since Clara and Nick will be there together. She goes out with Sally and Molly but changes her mind and ends up alone at the party. There, trying to avoid Clara and Nick, she spends the time dancing and doing shots with Ben. Nick decides it's awkward not to say hello and goes to “introduce" Clara to April in a tension filled moment. Clara and Nick leave together and so do April and Ben.

On the ride home April is mad at herself for putting herself in that situation and yells at Ben, who ends up kissing her. The Lyft driver orders them to get off the car due to the yelling and April and Ben start making out until she decides to stop since it's a stupid move. The next day she wakes up with a text from Nick saying he's outside of her house and wants to see her. They spend the day together and later admit they still have feelings for each other and kiss.

Later, Clara storms into the movie theater where April works and throws a client's Icee drink in April's face, yelling that Nick dumped her. April follows her and they start yelling at each other. April says something hurtful prompting Clara to leave. April gets fired. With just a few days left before orientation, April tries to put her affairs in order. Ben and her together tell Nick what happened between them and Nick punches Ben. She also comes clean to Nick about being Clara’s friend. Nick and Ben eventually make up.

The night before she leaves, April is enjoying a nice family dinner with her mother and sister, without yelling for once. Later, someone knocks at the door and it's Clara. They both apologize to each other and make up, deciding to spend their last night together doing something fun.

== Cast ==
- Hannah Marks as April
- Liana Liberato as Clara
- Dylan Sprouse as Nick
- Luke Spencer Roberts as Ben
- Meagan Kimberly Smith as Molly
- Haley Ramm as Sally
- Jessica Hecht as Susan
- Addison Riecke as Agnes
- Jacob Batalon as Jacob

== Production ==
The film was shot in Syracuse, New York during the winter of 2018.

== Release ==
The film had its worldwide premiere at the LA Film Festival on September 22, 2018. It was then released on VOD and digital on March 27, 2020.

== Reception ==
On the review aggregator website Rotten Tomatoes, 89% of 53 critics' reviews are positive, with an average rating of 6.9/10. The website's consensus reads: "Banana Split serves up a sweet comedic dish that serves as a delightful calling card for co-writer and star Hannah Marks." Metacritic, which uses a weighted average, assigned the film a score of 63 out of 100, based on 15 critics, indicating "generally favorable" reviews.

Sheila O'Malley of RogerEbert.com awarded the film 3 out of 4 stars, and called it "An entertaining and often insightful look at female friendship during a particularly strange time." Hannah Hoolihan of Screen Rant awarded the film 4 stars out of 5, writing: "Bolstered by a thoughtful script and beautifully authentic performances, Banana Split provides a fresh take on the coming-of-age romantic comedy." Kate Erbland of IndieWire graded the film a B+, and praised the lead actors saying they "are so charming and fun - that even expected turns feel clever and fresh." Joyce Slaton of Common Sense Media awarded the film four stars out of five. Elizabeth Weitzman of TheWrap wrote: "Marks and Liberato are a delight, equally appealing on their own and total #FriendshipGoals together. The two are close in real life and the strength of their chemistry is, ultimately, what makes the movie so special."

Owen Gleiberman of Variety said: "The director, Benjamin Kasulke, is a veteran cinematographer who brings the L.A. settings a spangly glow, but he stages too many scenes with generic 'punch.' I wish he'd played against the comedy instead of italicizing it, and that he'd come up with some pop-music epiphanies and ditched the film's cloying synthesizer score." Ignatiy Vishnevetsky of The A.V. Club graded the film a C, and criticized it as artificial and lacking insight, saying it "simply coasts on the extreme professionalism of the cast". Andy Crump of Paste gave the film a rating of 7.5.
