= To Fall in Love =

2017 American play

- Written by: Jennifer Lane
- Based on: New York Times article To Fall in Love with Anyone, Do This
- Characters: Merryn Thomas; Wyatt Grimes
- Original language: English
- Subject: Love and grief
- Genre: Drama

Premiere
- Date premiered: 2017
- Place premiered: San Diego International Fringe Festival

To Fall in Love is a 2017 American drama play written by Jennifer Lane that was based on an article she read in the New York Times. The play premiered at San Diego International Fringe Festival in 2017 and won Outstanding Drama and Outstanding Writing. It was later adapted into two feature length films, the most recent one premiering at Heartland International Film Festival.

== Production history ==
Lane was inspired from The New York Times article "To Fall in Love with Anyone, Do This". Eric Casalini and Beth Gallagher were cast as the leads.

Year	Venue	Location	Ref.
2017	San Diego International Fringe Festival	San Diego, California	
2019	Private residence	Pacific Beach, San Diego	
2019	Edinburgh Festival Fringe	Edinburgh, Scotland	
2019	The Constructivists	Milwaukee, Wisconsin	
2021	FAU Theatre Lab	Florida Atlantic University	
2022	Cold Comfort Theatre	Belfast, Maine	
2022	Nu Sass	Washington, D.C.	

== Accolades ==
Location	Year	Award	Result	Ref.
San Diego International Fringe Festival	2017	Outstanding Drama	Won	
San Diego International Fringe Festival	2017	Outstanding Writing	Won	
Tennessee Williams/New Orleans Literary Festival	2017	Tennessee Williams One-Act Play Competition	Won	
Eugene O'Neill Theater Center	2018	National Playwrights Contest	Semi-finalist	

== Film adaptation ==
The play was initially adapted for a feature film in 2018 by Michael Lewis Foster that starred Casalini and Gallagher. Foster remade the film in 2023, which went on to screen at Heartland International Film Festival, San Diego International Film Festival, and Oceanside International Film Festival. It won awards at the Oceanside International Film Festival.
