= Howard E. Barbaree =

Howard E. Barbaree is a University of Toronto psychology professor. He received a Significant Achievement Award from ATSA in 2001 and served as editor-in-chief of the Sexual Abuse journal from 2004 to 2010.

He is joint editor of The Juvenile Sex Offender, published in 1993 by The Guilford Press.
