= Rodents of Unusual Size =

2017 American documentary film

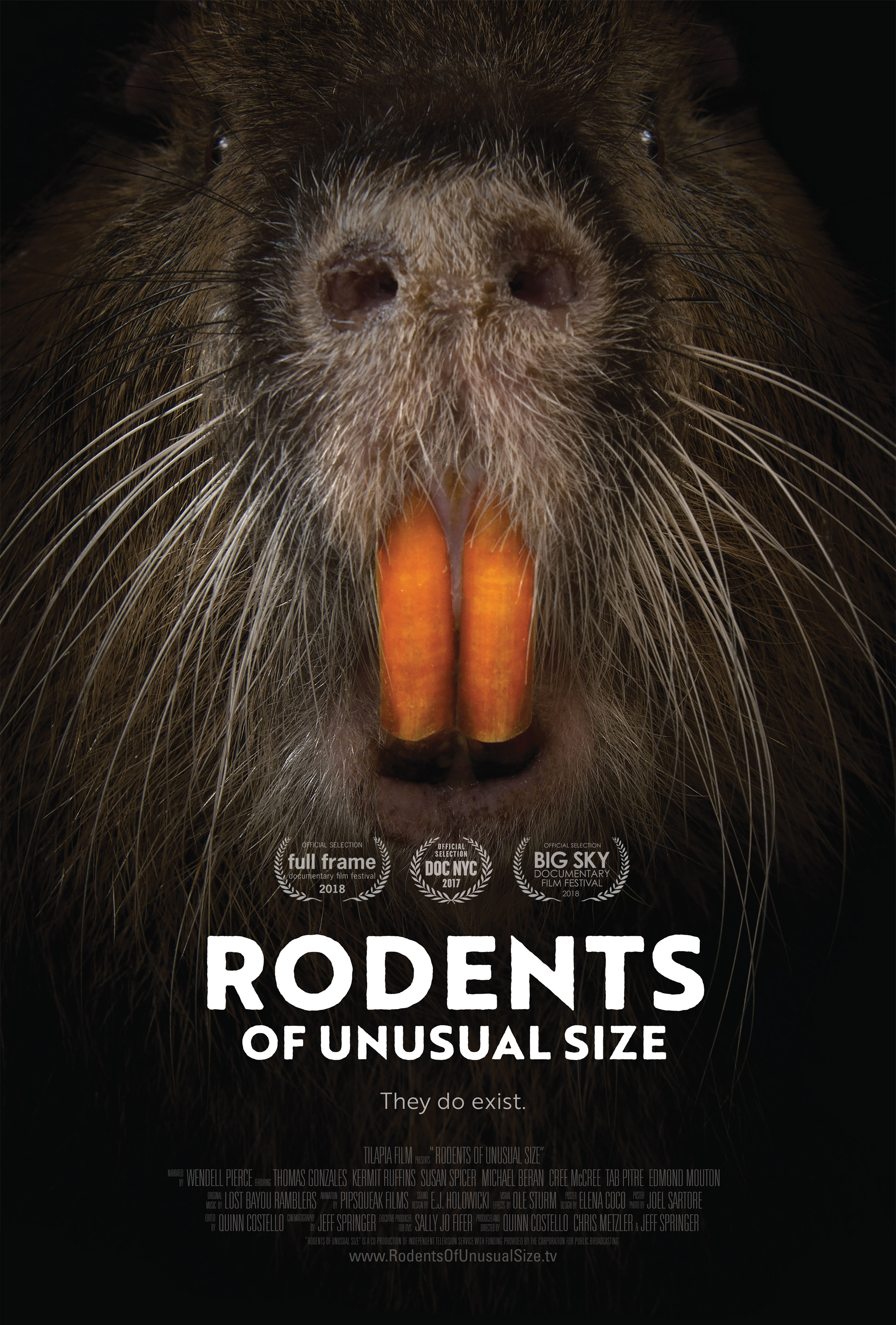
- Theatrical poster for the documentary "Rodents of Unusual Size"
- Directed by: Quinn Costello, Chris Metzler and Jeff Springer
- Narrated by: Wendell Pierce
- Music by: Lost Bayou Ramblers
- Distributed by: Tilapia Film; Grasshopper
- Release dates: 15 November 2017 (DOC NYC Film Festival); 14 September 2018 (United States)
- Running time: 71 minutes
- Country: United States
- Language: English

Rodents of Unusual Size is a 2017 documentary film funded by ITVS and directed by the team of Quinn Costello, Chris Metzler and Jeff Springer about giant invasive swamp rats, nutria, threatening coastal Louisiana. The film is narrated by Wendell Pierce with an all original musical soundtrack by the Cajun band Lost Bayou Ramblers. The name is a reference to the movie The Princess Bride which used the term as a running joke.

This feature-length film premiered during the 2017 version of the all documentary film festival DOC NYC, on 15 November 2017.

The film was released by Grasshopper Film and broadcast on the PBS TV series Independent Lens on 14 January 2019.

== Synopsis ==
Louisiana residents south of New Orleans have faced many an environmental threat, from oil spills to devastating hurricanes, but a growing problem are an invasive species known as nutria or colloquially called swamp rats in the region.

This invasive species from South America is accelerating erosion of the state's coastal wetlands, already one of the largest disappearing landmasses in the world.

The film covers the people (trappers, chefs, fashion designers, exotic pet enthusiasts) who have lived in the area for generations and are fighting back in creative ways. The film winds up being a joyful take on an ecological menace while revealing, in equal parts, human beings' impact on the environment and the local communities' surprising solutions to save their land before it disappears.

Through the offbeat and unexpected stories of the people confronting the nutria problem, Rodents of Unusual Size examines issues surrounding coastal erosion, the devastation surrounding hurricanes, loss of culture and homeland, and the resilience of the human spirit.

== Reception ==
On the review aggregator website Rotten Tomatoes, 98% of 46 critics' reviews are positive, with an average rating of 7.8/10. The website's consensus reads: "Rodents of Unusual Size approaches a variety of timely and thought-provoking subjects from fresh angles—and a lot of surprisingly large creatures in the bargain." On Metacritic it has a weighted average score of 65 out of 100, based on 8 reviews, indicating "generally favorable reviews".
