= Kate Hackett =

American actress

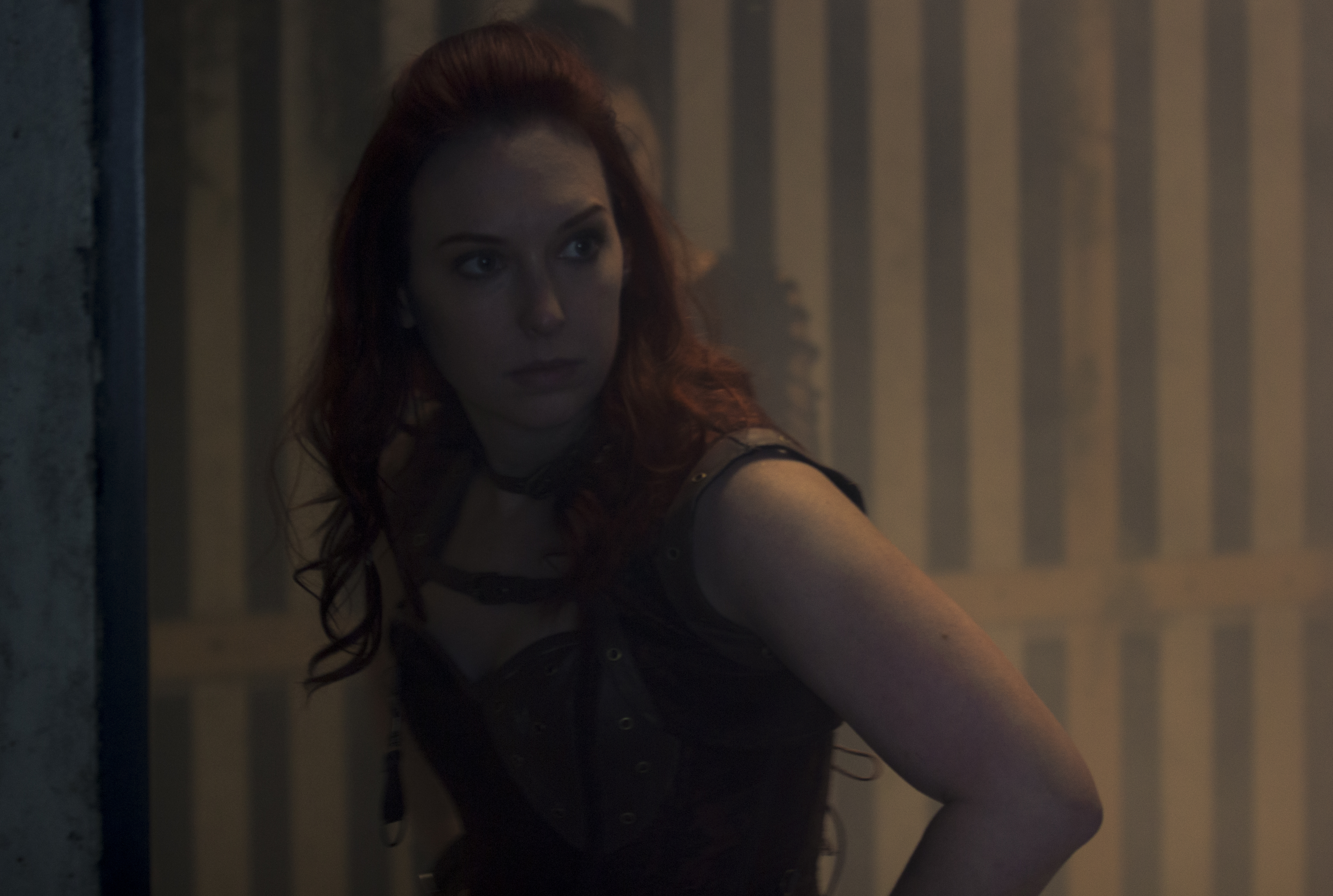
- Born: Maryland, United States
- Education: Boston University
- Occupations: Actress, writer, producer
- Years active: 2009–present
- Known for: Classic Alice, Best Laid Plans
- Website: katehackett.com

Kate Hackett is an actress, writer, and producer who created and starred as Alice Rackham in the Amazon web series Classic Alice. She appeared in Hulu's Best Laid Plans and Netflix's Real Rob.

== Career ==
Hackett began acting in campus productions as a history major at Boston University.

Hackett played the romantic lead in Hulu's all-improv series Best Laid Plans in 2010. She appeared in A Special Message for America's Teenagers. She produced, wrote and acted in 2013's Kate & Joe Just Want to Have Sex.

In 2013, Hackett worked on web series Classic Alice.

In 2016, Hackett worked on a series called Not a Plan. She worked as producer, writer, and actress on short film The Long Dig in 2017. In 2022, Hackett played "Hannah" in Anthony Parisi's Ambush at St Mary's. She won Best Supporting Actress for the role at the 14th Oceanside International Film Festival.
