= Chris Metzler =

American filmmaker and writer (born 1974)

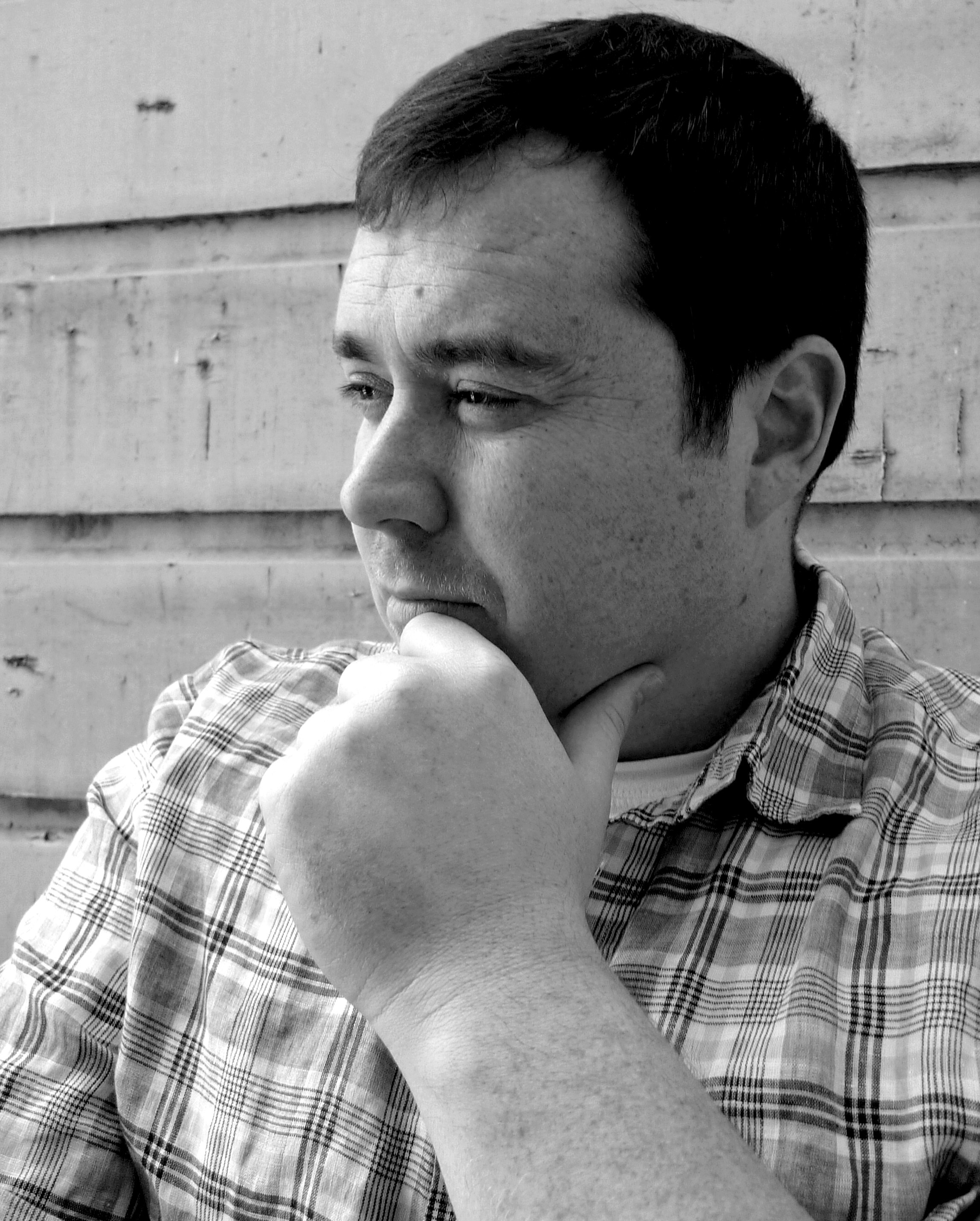
- Metzler at the Los Angeles Film Festival in 2010
- Born: May 23, 1974 (age 52); Kansas City, Kansas, U.S.
- Education: University of Southern California (B.S.)
- Occupation: Independent documentary filmmaker
- Years active: 1996–present
- Spouse: Nadja Mark (m. 2015)
- Children: 2

Chris Metzler (born May 23, 1974) is an American film director known for documentaries. His documentary Everyday Sunshine: The Story of Fishbone (2010) is listed in the 100 Best Documentaries ranked by the Tomatometer at Rotten Tomatoes

== Early life and education ==
Metzler was raised in Independence, Missouri.

He graduated with a degree in business and cinema from the University of Southern California. In his studies he was introduced to both music video and documentary filmmaking by Academy Award nominated filmmaker Tom Neff who taught a course on music video production. The students taking the course (USC CNTV 499) shot various music videos for country music artists such as Radney Foster, Lee Roy Parnell, Flaco Jiménez and others with financing from the record label Arista Nashville.

== Career ==
Metzler's film directing and producing work has resulted in frequent partnerships with Jeff Springer.

The two moved to Nashville and worked in the country and Christian music video industries, before moving to Los Angeles, California to work in rock n’ roll. Their music video for the band Third Day for the song Consuming Fire won a Billboard Music Award in the category of Best Christian Video. The video was shot on location in Bombay Beach, California and other areas around the Salton Sea.

Metzler co-directed the John Waters' narrated documentary, Plagues & Pleasures on the Salton Sea, with Jeff Springer which premiered at the 2004 Slamdance Film Festival. The film went on to screen at 200 film festivals worldwide, win 37 awards for Best Documentary, and was broadcast on the Sundance Channel and the PBS series America ReFramed.

In 2010, he completed the Emmy nominated documentary film, Everyday Sunshine: The Story of Fishbone, co-directed with Lev Anderson and shot and edited by Jeff Springer. The film was critically acclaimed with Rotten Tomatoes having the film listed as at 100% based on 48 reviews, and is ranked #74 on the list of the Top 100 Documentaries of All Time.

His most recent theatrically released film, co-directed with Quinn Costello and Jeff Springer, is the ITVS funded documentary Rodents of Unusual Size (2017) about giant invasive swamp rats, nutria threatening coastal Louisiana and is narrated by Wendell Pierce.

Metzler is a two time recipient of the Bay Area Video Coalition’s Mediamaker Award.

== Filmmaking style ==
The style and offbeat subject matter of Metzler's work is heavily influenced by filmmaking predecessors such as Errol Morris and Les Blank. A frequent theme of many of his films is the subjective notion of success and failure amidst the backdrop of the American Dream.

Metzler frequently utilizes narrative elements within his documentary films, namely stylized cinematography, animation, narration (John Waters, Laurence Fishburne, Wendell Pierce) and original musical scores composed by rock bands (Friends of Dean Martinez, Fishbone, Lost Bayou Ramblers).

The use of artistic additions to documentary films is rejected and criticized by cinema vérité style filmmakers. Cinéma vérité ('truthful cinema') is a style of documentary filmmaking, invented by Edgar Morin and Jean Rouch, inspired by Dziga Vertov's theory about Kino-Pravda. It combines improvisation with the use of the camera to unveil truth or highlight subjects hidden behind crude reality.

== Filmography ==
- 2004 Plagues and Pleasures on the Salton Sea - Director, producer, writer.
- 2010 Everyday Sunshine: The Story of Fishbone - Director, producer, writer.
- 2015 The State of Creativity - Director, producer, writer
- 2017 Rodents of Unusual Size - Director, producer, writer
- 2019 Heath Ceramics: The Making of a California Classic - Director, producer, writer
