= Juan Escobedo =

American actor

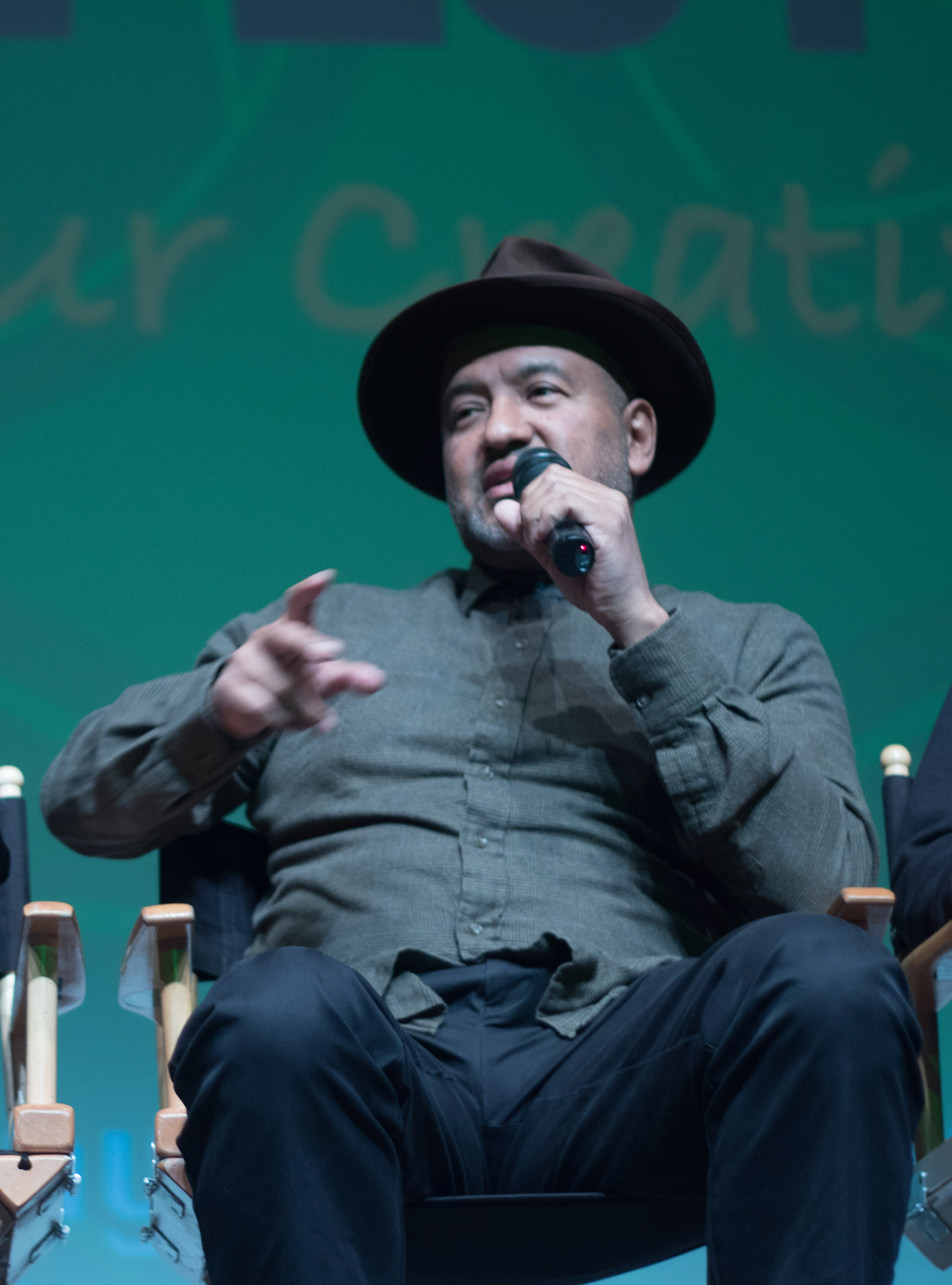
Juan Escobedo speaking to the Playhouse West Film Festival audience about the film Marisol and the true events that inspired the film.

Juan Escobedo is an American actor, director and photographer who was born and raised in San Diego, California.

== Film ==
In 2007 Escobedo portrayed and directed a troubled war veteran in the short film Soy Soldado de Irak. The film generated numerous awards including the Swiss Cultural Program's Best Film Award at the Cannes Film Festival (2008), and the Cinema of Conscience Award from the Sonoma Valley Film Festival (2008). It was most recently nominated for the prestigious Imagen Award (2009), which honors positive portrayals of Latinos in film and television. His other directorial work include Ruby, a film for Current TV. In 2018, Escobedo's other film Marisol, a short film that deals with the horrors of domestic violence and child abuse won the Best Dramatic Short at the Hollywood Reel Independent Film Festival and Best Actress Awards for both leading Actresses at the Women's Independent Film Festival and the Playhouse West Film Festival. Marisol script was also inducted into the Academy of Motion Picture Arts and Sciences (AMPAS) Margaret Herrick Library permanent collection made available to researchers.

Escobedo's film Marisol has become a film for creating awareness around child abuse and domestic violence. It continues to screen at film festivals most recently winning 3 awards for Best Director, Best Short Film and Best Child Actress at the San Diego Movie Awards.

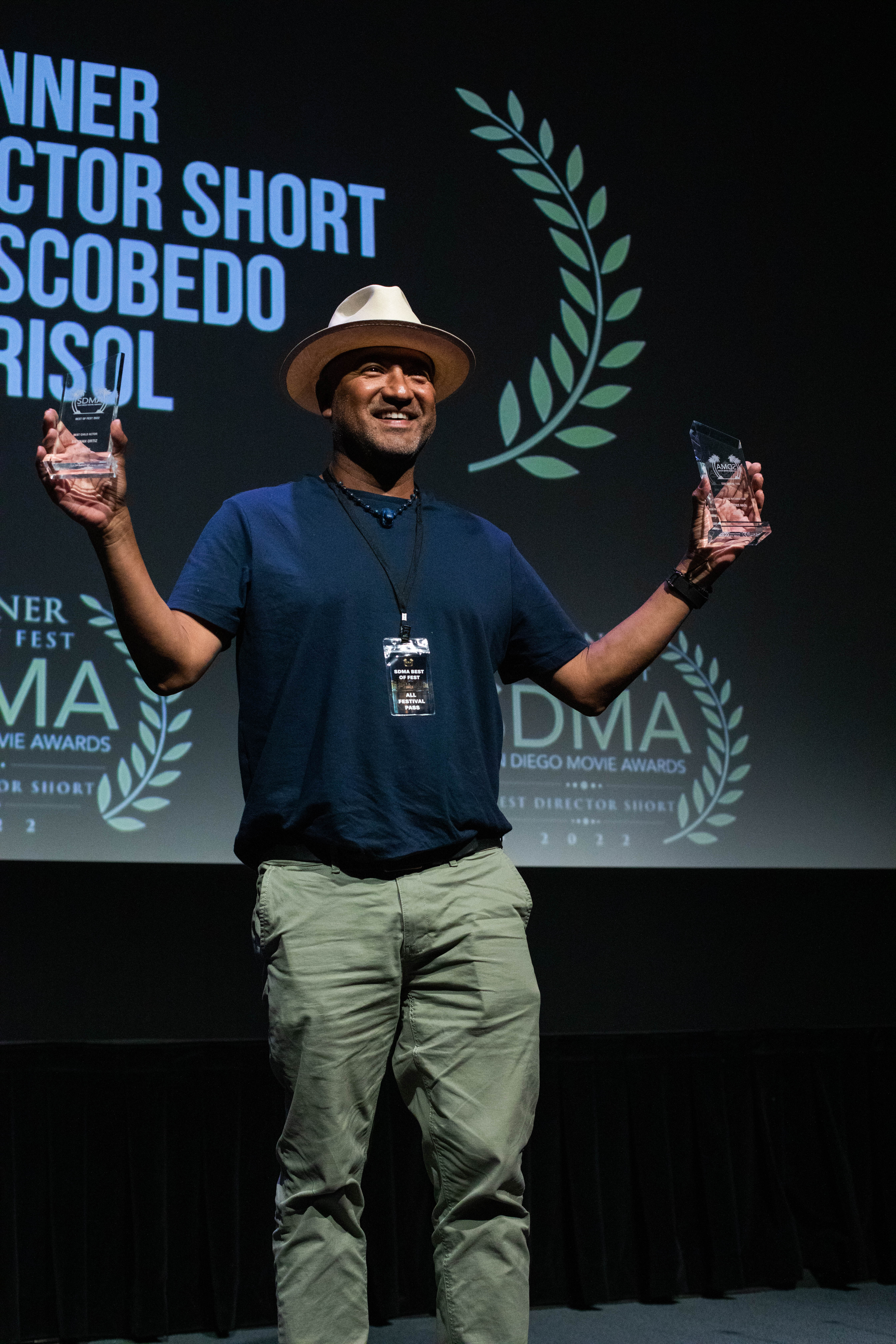
Juan Escobedo wins 3 Awards at SDMA

Escobedo began working with the Boyle Heights and East LA community in 2005 by implementing theater skits on HIV prevention at local schools. This led to working with Promotoras (community health workers) against violence and had maintained a strong relationship with the Promotoras from various nonprofits. His strong ties to Boyle Heights and East Los Angeles has influenced his film and photography work. In 2023, Escobedo received a fellowship from California Arts Council Creative Corps through Community Partners to direct and produce a documentary film with Las Promotoras against violence.

== Photography ==
The Los Angeles Department of Cultural Affairs (DCA) started publishing Juan Escobedo's photography in 2012 as part of the City of Los Angeles Heritage Month Celebrations which dates back to 1949 when Mayor Fletcher Bowron issued a proclamation to recognize African American Heritage Month. Over time, the city has elected to celebrate various heritage months consistent with federally designated monthly observances. Many cities celebrate residents’ cultural heritage during these federally designated monthly observances. In 2023, Juan Escobedo's self portrait titled El Sombrero de Miguel Lopez, in honor of his late grandfather Miguel Lopez was selected by Los Angeles County Arts Commission to display at Gloria Molina Grand Park across the way from Los Angeles City Hall. The photo El Sombrero de Miguel Lopez honored his beloved grandfather who took care of him as a child by photographing his sombrero that was passed on from his father Juan Escobedo Meza Padilla and mother Piedad Renteria Escobedo.

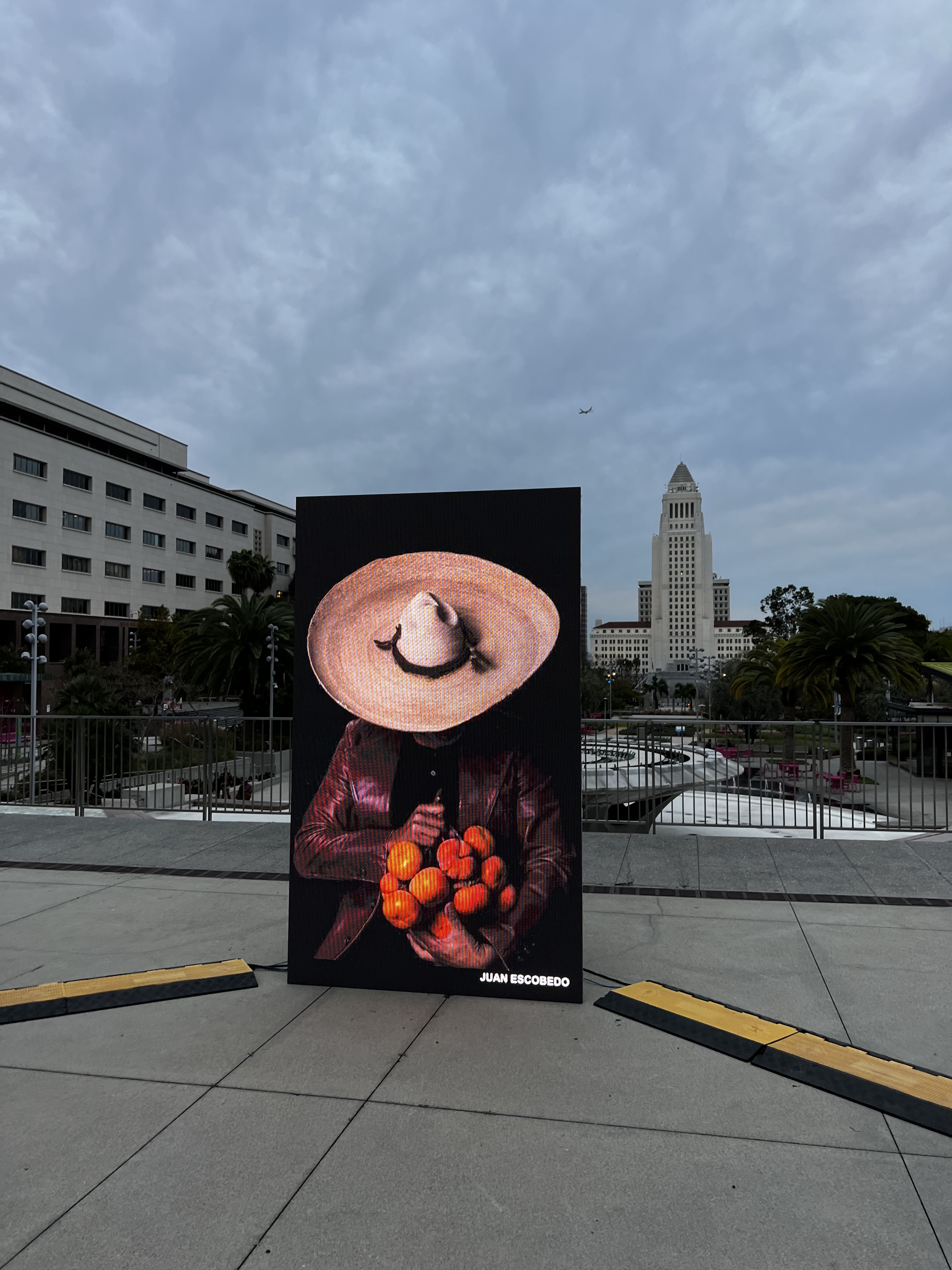
El Sombrero de Miguel Lopez by Juan Escobedo

Trash and Tears is a series of photographs Escobedo started in 2016 in which he photographs actors and models with trash around the city. It attempts to explore the issues of hoarding, mental health, income, graffiti and drug addiction through trash between non and homeless population. It's also a commentary on the carelessness of people refusing pick up their own trash or recycle. Therefore, accumulating in pockets throughout the city putting additional economic and men power burden on the City of Los Angeles. Oftentimes the photos are taken soon after homelessness encampments are dismantled, leaving personal and treasured belongings behind by homeless which others see as trash.

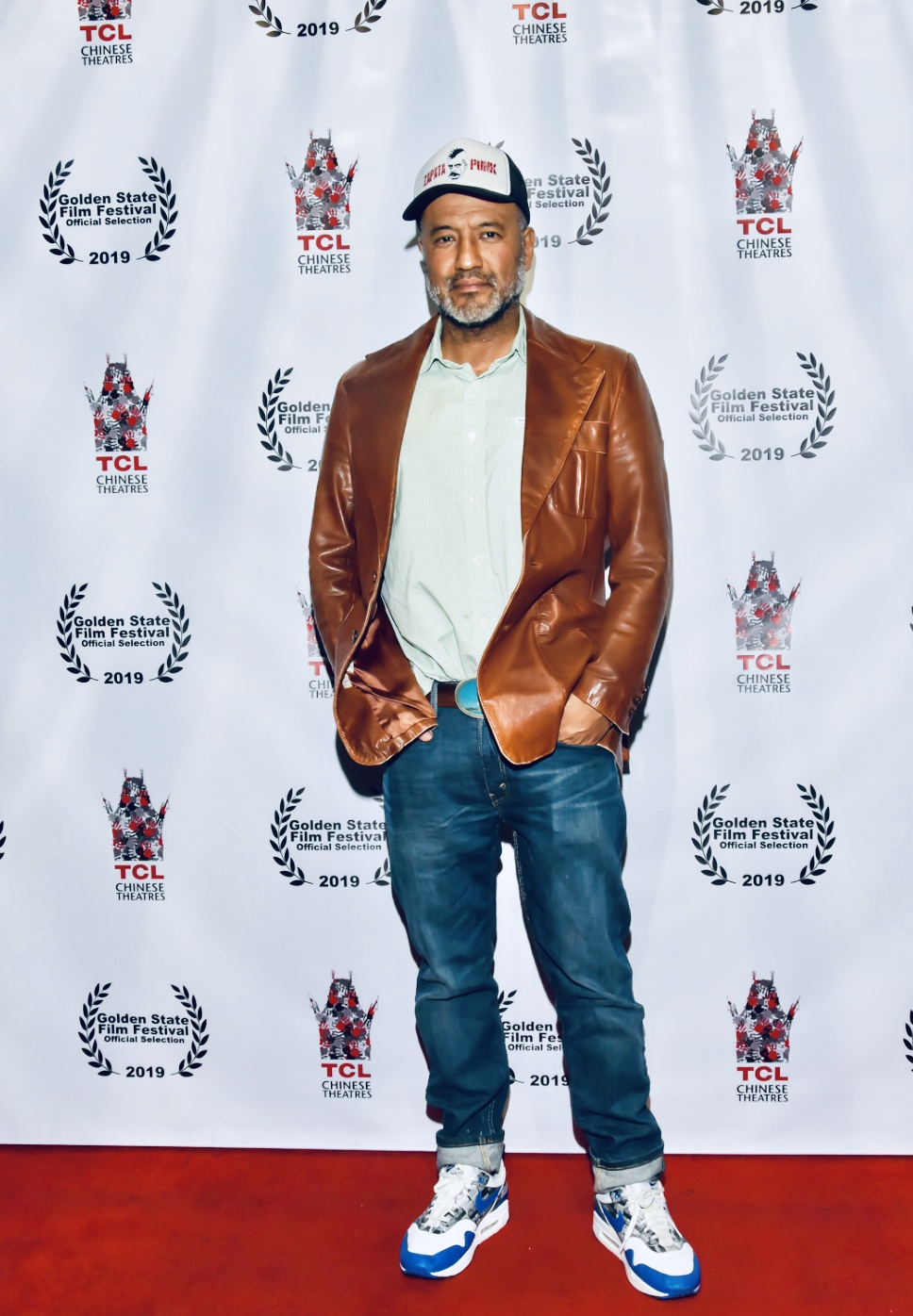
Juan Escobedo at the Golden State Film Festival at The Chinese Mann's Theater

== Nonprofit ==
In 2008 Escobedo founded The East Los Angeles Society of Film and Arts (TELASOFA) and the East LA Film Festival (ELAFF). TELASOFA is a non-profit organization dedicated to "Provoking Thought and Inspiring Solutions" for youth who are at risk of substance abuse, HIV/AIDS, early pregnancy and gang involvement TELASOFA produces the East Los Angeles Film Festival (ELAFF) to create opportunities and mentorships for youth seeking to breakthrough into the film industry in Hollywood. ELAFF provides film classes throughout the year with a culmination of film projects screening alongside Hollywood professionals at the annual East LA Film Festival. ELAFF is able to produce the festival by maintaining strong relationships and collaborations with film studios, museums and nonprofits.
