= Robert A. Prentky =

Robert A. Prentky is an American psychologist who has taught at the Fairleigh Dickinson University. He is a fellow of the Association for Psychological Science and the American Psychological Association.
