= Diana Rickard (sociologist) =

American sociologist

Diana Rickard is an American sociologist.
