= Indieflix =

American entertainment company

Indieflix.com
- Company type: Private
- Industry: Film distribution
- Founded: 2005
- Headquarters: Seattle, United States
- Number of locations: 1
- Area served: Worldwide
- Key people: Scilla Andreen, Paul Pigott
- Services: Film distribution, film promotion, streaming services, documentary production
- Revenue: Private
- Number of employees: 15
- Website: https://www.indieflix.com/

IndieFlix Group, Inc is an American entertainment company. Its streaming service is available on Amazon Fire TV, Roku, Apple TV, Xbox consoles, and internet connected devices including smart phones, smart TVs, and tablets.

== History ==
Indieflix was founded in 2005 by filmmakers Scilla Andreen and Gian Carlo Scandiuzzi, but is run solely by CEO Scilla Andreen. The company specializes in promoting independent film by providing online streaming platforms with filmmaker content. Indieflix offers an online streaming subscription for an annual price of $50 or $5 per month; additionally, library patrons may access to IndieFlix via their library, at no charge. As of June 2014, Indieflix has over 8,000 titles that include features, shorts, and documentaries, and is available in over 85 countries.

Indieflix has created and implemented an artist payment model called the RPM (Royalty Pool Minutes). The RPM model pays filmmakers for every minute watched of their content.

== IndieFlix Distribution Lab ==
IndieFlix created the Distribution Lab in 2013. IndieFlix works with schools and communities to schedule screenings of films. Some of the films released through the Distribution Lab include Living on One Dollar, Finding Kind, and The Empowerment Project.
