= Plagues & Pleasures on the Salton Sea =

2004 documentary film by Chris Metzler

- Directed by: Chris Metzler; Jeff Springer
- Narrated by: John Waters
- Music by: Friends of Dean Martinez
- Distributed by: Tilapia Film; New Video/Docurama
- Release dates: January 12, 2004 (Slamdance Film Festival); February 24, 2006 (United States)
- Running time: 73 minutes
- Country: United States
- Language: English
- Box office: $53,471

Plagues & Pleasures on the Salton Sea is a documentary film by Chris Metzler and Jeff Springer, with narration by John Waters and music by Friends of Dean Martinez.

This often humorous documentary tells the story of the accidental lake and environmental catastrophe known as the Salton Sea, located in the desert of southern California in the United States.

== Release ==
The film premiered at the 2004 Slamdance Film Festival. With the addition of John Waters as the film's narrator, the new version of the film premiered at the Provincetown International Film Festival, in Provincetown, Massachusetts, hosted by Mr. Waters himself. The film opened in select theaters on February 24, 2006 and continued to screen theatrically throughout the United States and Canada until late 2007.

A shorter, more environmentally themed version of the film aired on the Sundance Channel's GREEN programming block, along with occasional broadcasts on the PBS TV station KQED documentary series Truly, CA.

The DVD of Plagues & Pleasures on the Salton Sea was released by the home video distributor, Docurama/New Video, on September 25, 2007.

== Critical reception ==
The Christian Science Monitor's lead film critic, Peter Rainer, gave Plagues & Pleasures on the Salton Sea an "A" and called it a "One-of-a-kind documentary... A startlingly funny portrait of Gothic Americana." And the Baltimore Sun's Michael Sragow wrote "Because of Metzler and Springer's appetite for raw experience, what could have been a depressing horror movie is wildly funny and enraging. It's the rare documentary with something for everyone."

The review aggregator Rotten Tomatoes certified the film as "Fresh", reporting that 96% of critics gave the film positive reviews, based on 53 reviews. Metacritic reported the film had an average score of 72 out of 100, based on 8 reviews. In screening at more than 200 festivals in twenty countries, Plagues & Pleasures on the Salton Sea won 37 awards for Best Documentary.

== See also ==
- Bombay Beach, a 2011 documentary about the Salton Sea community of Bombay Beach, California
- Salvation Mountain, a folk art structure built by Leonard Knight, who is interviewed in the film
