= Sexual Predators =

- Author: Robert A. Prentky; Howard E. Barbaree; Eric S. Janus
- Publisher: Routledge
- Publication date: 2015
- Pages: 372
- ISBN: 978-1136016646

Sexual Predators: Society, Risk, and the Law is a 2015 book by Robert A. Prentky, Howard E. Barbaree and Eric S. Janus.
