= The Stains of Imprisonment =

Book by Alice Ievins

- Author: Alice Ievins
- Publisher: University of California Press
- Publication date: 2023
- Pages: 214
- ISBN: 978-0520383715

The Stains of Imprisonment: Moral Communication and Men Convicted of Sexual Offences is a book written by sociologist Alice Ievins. It was published by the University of California Press. Based on ethnographic research in an English prison housing men convicted of sexual offences, the book discusses how imprisonment communicates moral judgments to prisoners and how the messages shape understandings of guilt, identity, punishment and responsibility.
