= Pamela Koffler =

American film producer

Pamela Koffler is an American film and television producer and founding partner of Killer Films, an independent New York-based production company she co-leads with Christine Vachon.

Koffler has produced Hedwig and the Angry Inch, Mildred Pierce, The Velvet Underground, Past Lives, and May December, which premiered in competition at the 2023 Cannes Film Festival and was acquired by Netflix.

== Awards & recognition ==
Koffler has been nominated for a Primetime Emmy Award and a PGA Award for Mrs. Harris in 2006 and Mildred Pierce in 2011. She also received a Film Independent Spirit Award nomination for Hedwig and the Angry Inch in 2002 and win for I'm Losing You in 2000, and an IDA Award win for This American Life in 2008.

== Filmography ==
=== Film ===
As producer, unless otherwise noted.

| Year | Title | Director | Notes |
|---|---|---|---|
| 1997 | Office Killer | Cindy Sherman | |
| 1998 | I'm Losing You | Bruce Wagner | |
| 1999 | Boys Don't Cry | Kimberly Peirce | as Executive Producer |
| 2000 | Crime + Punishment in Suburbia | Rob Schmidt | |
| 2001 | Hedwig and the Angry Inch | John Cameron Mitchell | |
| 2001 | Women in Film | Bruce Wagner | |
| 2001 | Chelsea Walls | Ethan Hawke | |
| 2001 | The Safety of Objects | Rose Troche | as Executive Producer |
| 2001 | The Grey Zone | Tim Blake Nelson | |
| 2002 | One Hour Photo | Mark Romanek | |
| 2003 | Camp | Todd Graff | |
| 2003 | The Company | Robert Altman | |
| 2004 | A Home at the End of the World | Michael Mayer | |
| 2005 | The Notorious Bettie Page | Mary Harron | |
| 2007 | An American Crime | Tommy O'Haver | as Executive Producer |
| 2007 | Savage Grace | Tom Kalin | |
| 2007 | Then She Found Me | Helen Hunt | |
| 2009 | Motherhood | Katherine Dieckmann | |
| 2010 | Dirty Girl | Abe Sylvia | as Executive Producer |
| 2012 | At Any Price | Ramin Bahrani | |
| 2013 | Kill Your Darlings | John Krokidas | as Executive Producer |
| 2013 | Magic Magic | Sebastián Silva | as Executive Producer |
| 2013 | Deep Powder | Mo Ogrodnik | |
| 2013 | The Last of Robin Hood | Richard Glatzer & Wash Westmoreland | |
| 2013 | Innocence | Hilary Brougher | |
| 2014 | Young Bodies Heal Quickly | Andrew T. Betzer | |
| 2014 | Mala Mala | Antonio Santini & Dan Sickles | as Executive Producer |
| 2014 | Still Alice | Richard Glatzer & Wash Westmoreland | |
| 2017 | Beatriz at Dinner | Miguel Arteta | |
| 2017 | Wonderstruck | Todd Haynes | |
| 2018 | Colette | Wash Westmoreland | |
| 2019 | American Woman | Semi Chellas | as Executive Producer |
| 2019 | Dark Waters | Todd Haynes | |
| 2020 | The World to Come | Mona Fastvold | |
| 2021 | The Velvet Underground | Todd Haynes | as Executive Producer |
| 2023 | Past Lives | Celine Song | |
| 2023 | She Came to Me | Rebecca Miller | |
| 2023 | A Good Person | Zach Braff | |
| 2023 | May December | Todd Haynes | |
| 2025 | Materialists | Celine Song | |
| 2026 | The Last Day | Rachel Rose | |

=== Television (as executive producer) ===
| Year | Title | Director/Creator | Notes |
|---|---|---|---|
| 2005 | Mrs. Harris | Phyllis Nagy (Director) | TV Movie |
| 2011 | Mildred Pierce | Todd Haynes (Series Director) | Limited Series |
| 2013 | Six by Sondheim (segment 'I'm Still Here') | Todd Haynes (Segment Director) | TV Movie |
| 2015-2017 | Z: The Beginning of Everything | Dawn Prestwich & Nicole Yorkin (Creators) | |
| 2021 | Halston | Daniel Minahan (Series Director) | Limited Series |
