= Rebecca Carroll =

Writer and radio producer

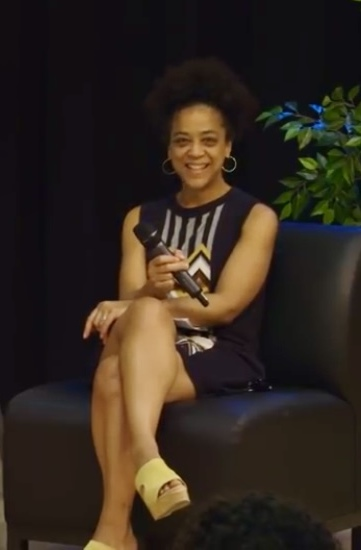
- Carroll in 2018
- Born: 1969 (age 56–57)

Rebecca Anne Carroll (born 1969) is an American writer, editor and radio producer. She is producer of special projects at WNYC and the editor of collections including Sugar in the Raw: Voices of Young Black Girls in America and Saving the Race: Conversations on Du Bois from a Collective Memoir of Souls. She is a producer of the podcast on gentrification in Brooklyn There Goes the Neighborhood (produced with The Nation). Previously she was managing editor at xoJane and was the founding editor at Africana.com.

On February 2, 2021, Carroll published a memoir, Surviving the White Gaze. The book recounts Carroll's experience growing up as the only Black person and adoptive daughter of loving, white artist parents in their New Hampshire town. She felt some growing isolation as time went on but her life changed substantially when she met her white birth mother, who undermined Carroll's confidence as well as her identity as a Black person. The book traces the evolving tensions between her desire for acceptance from her mother, her love for her adoptive parents, and her own identity. Prior to publication, MGM/UA Television acquired the rights, with Carroll planned to adapt her memoir as a limited series produced by Christine Vachon and Pamela Koffler at Killer Films.
