= Christine Vachon =

American film producer (born 1962)

- Vachon at the 2026 BFI London Film Festival
- Born: November 21, 1962 (age 63); New York City, New York, U.S.
- Education: Brown University
- Occupation: Producer
- Years active: 1985–present
- Partner: Marlene McCarty
- Children: 1
- Parent(s): John Vachon; Françoise Fourestier

Christine Vachon (/væˈʃɒn/; born November 21, 1962) is an American film producer active in the American independent film sector.

Vachon produced Todd Haynes's first feature, Poison (1991), which was awarded the Grand Jury Prize at the Sundance Film Festival. Since then, she has produced many acclaimed independent films, including Far from Heaven, Boys Don't Cry, One Hour Photo, Hedwig and the Angry Inch, Velvet Goldmine, Safe, Go Fish, Swoon, I'm Not There, and Carol. She also produced the HBO miniseries Mildred Pierce.

Vachon also participates as a member of the Jury for the NYICFF, a New York City festival dedicated to screening films for children between the ages of 3 and 18.

== Early life ==
Vachon was born in Manhattan, New York City. She is the daughter of Françoise Fourestier and photographer John Vachon.

== Career ==
Vachon graduated in 1983 from Brown University, where she met director Todd Haynes and Barry Ellsworth. In 1987, the three created Apparatus Productions, a nonprofit company deeply inspired by the anti-Hollywood New York film scene, and oversaw the production of seven films in five years. Vachon herself wrote and directed three short films, A Man in Your Room (1984), Days Are Numbered (1986) and The Way of the Wicked (1989). Most notoriously, Apparatus produced Haynes's controversial Superstar: The Karen Carpenter Story, a film depicting the dramatic rise and fall of the anorexic pop star. To make financial ends meet, Vachon became a proofreader by night. She also took on odd jobs in the film industry to learn the trade.

=== Killer Films ===
Vachon and fellow New York producer Pamela Koffler run Killer Films, which was established in 1996. The company celebrated its 10th anniversary in 2005 and was honored with a retrospective at the Museum of Modern Art in New York.

Vachon's first feature, Poison (written and directed by Haynes), won the Grand Jury Prize Dramatic at the Sundance Film Festival in 1991. Since then, she has worked on several noteworthy films, including I Shot Andy Warhol, Happiness, Kids, One Hour Photo, and Boys Don't Cry. She has worked on all of Haynes's feature films to date, including Safe, Velvet Goldmine, Far From Heaven, and I'm Not There, for which Cate Blanchett received both Academy Award and SAG Award nominations for Best Supporting Actress, and which was nominated for four Independent Spirit Awards, with Blanchett winning Best Supporting Actress.

In 2008, Vachon won an Emmy for her role as executive producer for the TV adaptation of Ira Glass's This American Life.

Killer Films's 2008 releases included Savage Grace, directed by Tom Kalin and starring Julianne Moore; An American Crime, starring Catherine Keener and Elliot Page, directed by Tommy O'Haver; and Then She Found Me, the directorial debut of Helen Hunt, starring herself, Bette Midler, Colin Firth and Matthew Broderick.

Vachon continued her collaboration with Haynes on the 2015 film Carol and the 2023 film May December. She produced the 2023 film Past Lives, for which she received her first Academy Award nomination.

Vachon is the artistic director of the MFA Program at Stony Brook Manhattan.

== Personal life ==
Vachon and her partner, artist Marlene McCarty, live in the East Village of New York with their daughter. In 2009, Vachon went into remission after a bout of breast cancer.

== Filmography ==
Director's name in brackets after film title.

=== As producer ===
- 1991: Poison (Todd Haynes)
- 1992: Swoon (Tom Kalin)
- 1994: Postcards from America (Steve McLean)
- 1995: Stonewall (Nigel Finch)
- 1995: Safe (Todd Haynes)
- 1995: Kids (Larry Clark)
- 1996: I Shot Andy Warhol (Mary Harron)
- 1997: Office Killer (Cindy Sherman)
- 1997: Kiss Me, Guido (Tony Vitale)
- 1998: Velvet Goldmine (Todd Haynes)
- 1998: I'm Losing You (Bruce Wagner)
- 1998: Happiness (Todd Solondz)
- 1999: Boys Don't Cry (Kimberly Peirce)
- 2000: Crime and Punishment in Suburbia (Rob Schmidt)
- 2001: Hedwig and the Angry Inch (John Cameron Mitchell)
- 2001: Series 7: The Contenders (Daniel Minahan)
- 2001: Women in Film (Bruce Wagner)
- 2001: Chelsea Walls (Ethan Hawke)
- 2001: Storytelling (Todd Solondz)
- 2002: One Hour Photo (Mark Romanek)
- 2001: The Grey Zone (Tim Blake Nelson)
- 2001: The Safety of Objects (Rose Troche)
- 2002: Far from Heaven (Todd Haynes)
- 2003: Party Monster (Fenton Bailey and Randy Barbato)
- 2003: Camp (Todd Graff)
- 2003: The Company (Robert Altman)
- 2004: A Home at the End of the World (Michael Mayer)
- 2004: A Dirty Shame (John Waters)
- 2005: The Notorious Bettie Page (Mary Harron)
- 2006: Infamous (Douglas McGrath)
- 2007: An American Crime (Tommy O'Haver)
- 2007: I'm Not There (Todd Haynes)
- 2007: Then She Found Me (Helen Hunt)
- 2008: Savage Grace (Tom Kalin)
- 2008: Gigantic (Matt Aselton)
- 2009: Motherhood (Katherine Dieckmann)
- 2009: Cracks (Jordan Scott)
- 2010: Loop Planes (short) (Robin Wilby)
- 2010: Charley (short) (Dee Austin Robertson)
- 2010: What's Wrong with Virginia (Dustin Lance Black)
- 2010: Lullaby for Pi (Benoit Philippon)
- 2013: Deep Powder (Mo Ogordnik)
- 2013: The Last of Robin Hood (Wash Westmoreland and Richard Glatzer)
- 2013: Innocence (Hilary Brougher)
- 2015: Carol (Todd Haynes)
- 2016: Goat (Andrew Neel)
- 2016: Wiener-Dog (Todd Solondz)
- 2016: A Kind of Murder (Andy Goddard)
- 2017: Where Is Kyra? (Andrew Dosunmu)
- 2017: Beatriz at Dinner (Miguel Arteta)
- 2017: Wonderstruck (Todd Haynes)
- 2017: First Reformed (Paul Schrader)
- 2017: My Days of Mercy (Tali Shalom-Ezer)
- 2018: Colette (Wash Westmoreland)
- 2018: Vox Lux (Brady Corbet)
- 2019: Dark Waters (Todd Haynes)
- 2020: Zola (Janicza Bravo)
- 2020: Shirley (Josephine Decker)
- 2020: Brothers by Blood (Jeremie Guez)
- 2021: The Velvet Underground (Todd Haynes)
- 2022: Anything's Possible (Billy Porter)
- 2023: Past Lives (Celine Song)
- 2023: She Came to Me (Rebecca Miller)
- 2023: Bleeding Love (Emma Westenberg)
- 2023: A Good Person (Zach Braff)
- 2023: May December (Todd Haynes)
- 2024: A Different Man (Aaron Schimberg)
- 2025: Materialists (Celine Song)
- 2025: Late Fame (Kent Jones)
- 2026: The Last Day (Rachel Rose)
- 2026: Pretty Babies (Tyler-Marie Evans)
- TBA: Lone Wolf (Mark Pellington)
- TBA: Fleur (Ellie Foumbi)
- TBA: De Noche (Todd Haynes)

=== As executive producer ===
- 1994: Go Fish (Rose Troche)
- 2005: Mrs. Harris (Phyllis Nagy)
- 2007–2008: This American Life (various)
- 2009: Cairo Time (Ruba Nadda)
- 2010: Dirty Girl (Abe Sylvia)
- 2010: Lulu at the Ace Hotel (short) (Maya Kazan)
- 2011: Mildred Pierce (Todd Haynes)
- 2014: Still Alice (Wash Westmoreland and Richard Glatzer)
- 2015: Nasty Baby (Sebastián Silva)
- 2016: White Girl (Elizabeth Wood)
- 2016: Frank & Lola (Matthew Ross)
- 2017: Dina (Dan Sickles & Antonio Santini)
- 2017: Lemon (Janicza Bravo)
- 2020: The World to Come (Mona Fastvold)
- 2021: Halston (Daniel Minahan)
- 2021: Pride (various)
- 2024: Omni Loop (Bernardo Britto)
- 2024: The Brutalist (Brady Corbet)
- 2024: On Swift Horses (Daniel Minahan)
- 2025: Mad Bills to Pay (or Destiny, dile que no soy malo) (Joel Alfonso Vargas)
- 2026: Barbara Forever (Brydie O'Connor)
- 2026: Queer Edward II (Theo Rollason)
- TBA: The Exiles (Midi Z)

=== As director ===
- 1984: A Man in Your Room (short)
- 1986: Days Are Numbered (short)
- 1989: The Way of the Wicked (short)

== Works and publications ==
- Schamus, James, Barry Ellsworth, Todd Haynes, and Christine Vachon. The Apparatus Guide to No-Budget Filmmaking in New York City. New York: Apparatus Productions, 1989. OCLC 801262187
- Vachon, Christine, and David Edelstein. Shooting to Kill: How an Independent Producer Blasts Through the Barriers to Make Movies That Matter. New York: Harper Perennial, 2002. Reprint of 1998 edition. ISBN 978-0-380-79854-4 OCLC 793342718
- Vachon, Christine, and Austin Bunn. A Killer Life: How an Independent Film Producer Survives Deals and Disasters in Hollywood and Beyond. New York: Simon & Schuster, 2006. ISBN 978-0-743-25630-8 OCLC 238812473 2007 Limelight Edition.

== Awards and juries ==
=== Awards ===
- 1994: Frameline Film Festival/San Francisco International LGBT Film Festival, Award for Outstanding Achievement in Lesbian and Gay Media
- 1996: New York Women in Film and Television, Muse Award for Outstanding Vision and Achievement
- 1999: IFP, Gotham Award for producing
- 2000: Provincetown International Film Festival, Provincetown Filmmaker on the Edge Award to Vachon and Killer Films
- 2002: New York Film Critics Circle Award for Best Film, Far from Heaven
- 2002: Independent Spirit Award for Best Film, Far from Heaven
- 2003: National Board of Review Award, Producers Award
- 2007: Woodstock Film Festival, Honorary Maverick Award
- 2023: Gotham Independent Film Award for Best Feature, Past Lives
- 2023: Independent Spirit Award for Best Film, Past Lives
- 2024: Gotham Independent Film Award for Best Feature, A Different Man
- 2026: Irving G. Thalberg Memorial Award
- Vachon and Killer Films have been given special tributes from the SXSW and Deauville Film Festivals.

=== Juries ===
- 1993: Sundance Film Festival, dramatic jury member
- 2005: Venice Film Festival, jury member
- 2005: Sundance Film Festival, dramatic jury member
- 2010: Sarajevo Film Festival, jury member
- 2012: 60th San Sebastián International Film Festival, member and jury president
