= Late Fame =

2025 film directed by Kent Jones

- Theatrical release poster
- Directed by: Kent Jones
- Screenplay by: Samy Burch
- Based on: Late Fame by Arthur Schnitzler
- Produced by: Pamela Koffler; Christine Vachon; Mason Plotts; Danny Roberts; H.S. Naji; Jackie Langelier; Ethan Lazar; Taylor Shung
- Starring: Willem Dafoe; Greta Lee; Edmund Donovan
- Cinematography: Wyatt Garfield
- Edited by: Mike Selemon
- Music by: Don Fleming
- Production companies: Killer Films; Fresh Fish Films; Morning Moon Productions; Working Barn Productions; Pine Bay Pictures; Spark Features; In Bloom; AmorFortuna
- Distributed by: Magnolia Pictures
- Release dates: August 30, 2025 (Venice); August 7, 2026 (United States)
- Running time: 97 minutes
- Country: United States
- Language: English
- Box office: $1 million

Late Fame is a 2025 American drama film directed by Kent Jones, written by Samy Burch and based on the posthumously published novella by Arthur Schnitzler. It stars Willem Dafoe, Greta Lee and Edmund Donovan.

The film had its world premiere in the Orizzonti section of the 82nd Venice International Film Festival on August 30, 2025. It was released on August 7, 2026, by Magnolia Pictures.

== Plot ==
Ed Saxberger lives in obscurity in downtown Manhattan, where he has resided since moving from Pennsylvania to join the bohemian art scene fifty years ago. Ed's daily routine consists of working in a post office and playing pool at a nearby bar with his fellow working-class friends. He listens to his sister's voicemails as she chronicles their brother's declining health, pleading with Ed to visit him.

One day Ed is approached by Meyers, a wealthy and pretentious NYU grad who has become a fervent admirer of Ed since reading Way Past Go, a book of poems Ed published in the 1970s; having shared the book with "The Enthusiasm Society", a group of wealthy young writers, Meyers tells Ed that they have become massive fans of his work. Curious, Ed accepts Meyers' invitation to meet them and is quickly enamored by the attention he receives from the group, especially the flirtatious actress Gloria.

The group plans to host a reading and, at Meyers' urging, Ed agrees to compose an original poem to be read as the featured performance. Meyers uses his connections to put Ed in contact with a literary agent as a "rediscovery" but Ed loses his enthusiasm when he learns the meeting was for a memoir and not to republish his previous work. Ed struggles with writer's block and continues to ignore his sister's phone calls.

Ed gifts Arnold, one of his friends, a copy of Way Past Go for his birthday, but Arnold and the other patrons mock Ed's past as a Bohemian poet. Gloria arrives at his apartment unannounced, pretending to be Ed's lover when Arnold visits to apologize for how he reacted to Ed's gift. Ed meets Gloria outside, and they take mushrooms and walk around SoHo. They kiss at a park before she takes him to a bar where she performs as a flapper era singer to a group of admiring men.

The day before the reading Ed confesses to the Enthusiasm Society he hasn't written a single word of his new poem. Angry and panicked, the group decides that one of Ed's previous poems will be performed instead. Ed visits Gloria unannounced and overcomes her protests to visit her, finding her without makeup and no longer adopting her actress persona. A man enters the apartment, where he and Gloria have a tense argument. At Gloria's insistence and despite his protests, Ed leaves.

At the reading, the group is in a panic when Gloria is late; she arrives acting as a glamorous, fainting, and drug-addled actress. Despite her persona, Gloria dramatically performs a monologue written by one of the members to wide applause, but is afterwards too inebriated to read Ed's poem. At the end of the reading, he himself reads the poem, one reflecting on his experience first moving to NYC and an unrequited love that mimics his recent experiences. The poem is extremely well received and Ed is crowned with laurels. Gloria asks Ed to inform the boys she has accepted a role in The Winter's Tale at a reputable theatre in Minneapolis and will be leaving. A voicemail from Ed's sister reveals their brother passed away.

Later, the Enthusiasm Society read reviews that are largely negative bar Gloria and Ed's contributions. The group erupts in argument after they learn Meyers wrote one himself in which he had nothing positive to say, dissolving altogether. Ed is followed by the group's youngest member, Winn, who asks Ed to review his work, insistent that Ed's fame means his opinion matters. Winn then reveals he never read Way Past Go, nor did any other member of the Enthusiasm Society except Meyers, taking his insistence of Ed's influence at face value. Ed tells Winn he will read Winn's work when Winn reads his and heads into the bar to play pool.

== Cast ==
- Willem Dafoe as Ed Saxberger
- Greta Lee as Gloria
- Edmund Donovan as Meyers
- Clay Singer as Brussard
- Luca Padovan as Winn
- Graham Campbell as Sherfey
- Arthur Langlie as Carmichael
- Jake Lacy as Literary Agent
- Tony Torn as Paulie
- Clark Johnson as Arnold

== Production ==
In May 2024, Variety reported that Late Fame, starring Willem Dafoe and Sandra Hüller, was expected to begin filming in New York City that fall with a screenplay penned by Samy Burch. The report noted that Pamela Koffler and Christine Vachon of Killer Films had signed on as producers and that the project would seek distributors at Cannes Film Festival. Martin Scorsese served as an executive producer.

In October 2024, Greta Lee replaced Hüller, who dropped out due to scheduling conflicts. In January 2025, it was reported Edmund Donovan had joined the cast, with principal photography beginning the week of January 22, 2025, in New York and New Jersey.

== Release ==
The film had its world premiere in the Orizzonti section of the 82nd Venice International Film Festival on August 30, 2025. Its North American premiere took place on September 28, 2025 at the 2025 New York Film Festival. It also screened at the 63rd Viennale where it was awarded the Der Standard Reader Jury Viennale Award.

In December 2025, Magnolia Pictures acquired the distribution rights to the film. The film was released in the United States on August 7, 2026.

== Reception ==
On review aggregator website Rotten Tomatoes, the film holds an approval rating of 94% based on 111 reviews, with an average rating of 6.6/10. The website’s consensus reads: "A gentle rumination on art and authenticity, Late Fame's wistful narrative is made lively by Willem Dafoe and Greta Lee's wonderfully complementary performances." In the Wall Street Journal, Kyle Smith called the film "like a wonderful little poem. It’s also a touching nod to the past, gracefully intertwining aspects of Metropolitan and Dead Poets Society."
