= Mildred Pierce (miniseries) =

2011 miniseries directed by Todd Haynes

- Promotional poster
- Based on: Mildred Pierce by James M. Cain
- Screenplay by: Todd Haynes; Jon Raymond
- Directed by: Todd Haynes
- Starring: Kate Winslet; Guy Pearce; Evan Rachel Wood; Melissa Leo
- Music by: Carter Burwell
- Country of origin: United States
- Original language: English
- No. of episodes: 5

Production
- Producers: Todd Haynes; Christine Vachon; John Wells; Pamela Koffler; Ilene S. Landress
- Cinematography: Edward Lachman
- Editor: Affonso Gonçalves
- Running time: 58–79 minutes
- Production companies: HBO; MGM Television; Killer Films; John Wells Productions
- Budget: $20 million

Original release
- Network: HBO
- Release: March 27 – April 10, 2011

Mildred Pierce is an American historical drama miniseries created by Todd Haynes for HBO. Adapted from James M. Cain's 1941 novel of the same name, It is about the titular heroine (Kate Winslet), a divorcée during the Great Depression struggling to establish a restaurant business while yearning for the respect of her narcissistic elder daughter (Evan Rachel Wood). The miniseries also features Guy Pearce and Melissa Leo. It is the second adaptation of the novel, after the 1945 film noir produced by Warner Bros. and starring Joan Crawford. Carter Burwell wrote the original score for the miniseries.

Mildred Pierce aired on HBO from March 27 to April 10, 2011, consisting of five episodes. It received a limited audience but gained positive reviews, especially for the performances. At the 63rd Primetime Emmy Awards, the series was nominated for 9 awards, winning 2: Outstanding Lead Actress for Winslet and Outstanding Supporting Actor for Pearce.

== Synopsis ==
Mildred Pierce depicts an overprotective, self-sacrificing mother during the Great Depression who finds herself separated from her husband, opening a restaurant of her own and falling in love with a man, all the while trying to earn her spoiled, narcissistic elder daughter's love and respect.

== Cast ==
- Kate Winslet as Mildred Pierce
- Guy Pearce as Monty Beragon
- Evan Rachel Wood as Veda Pierce (Dilber Yunus and Sumi Jo as her singing "voice")
- Miriam Shor as Anna
- Melissa Leo as Lucy Gessler
- Morgan Turner as Young Veda Pierce
- James LeGros as Wally Burgan
- Brían F. O'Byrne as Bert Pierce
- Mare Winningham as Ida Corwin
- Hope Davis as Mrs. Forrester
- Quinn McColgan as Moire "Ray" Pierce
- Waltrudis Buck as Mrs. Temple

== Filming ==
Parts of the miniseries were filmed in three New York locations: Peekskill, Point Lookout and Merrick.

== Reception ==
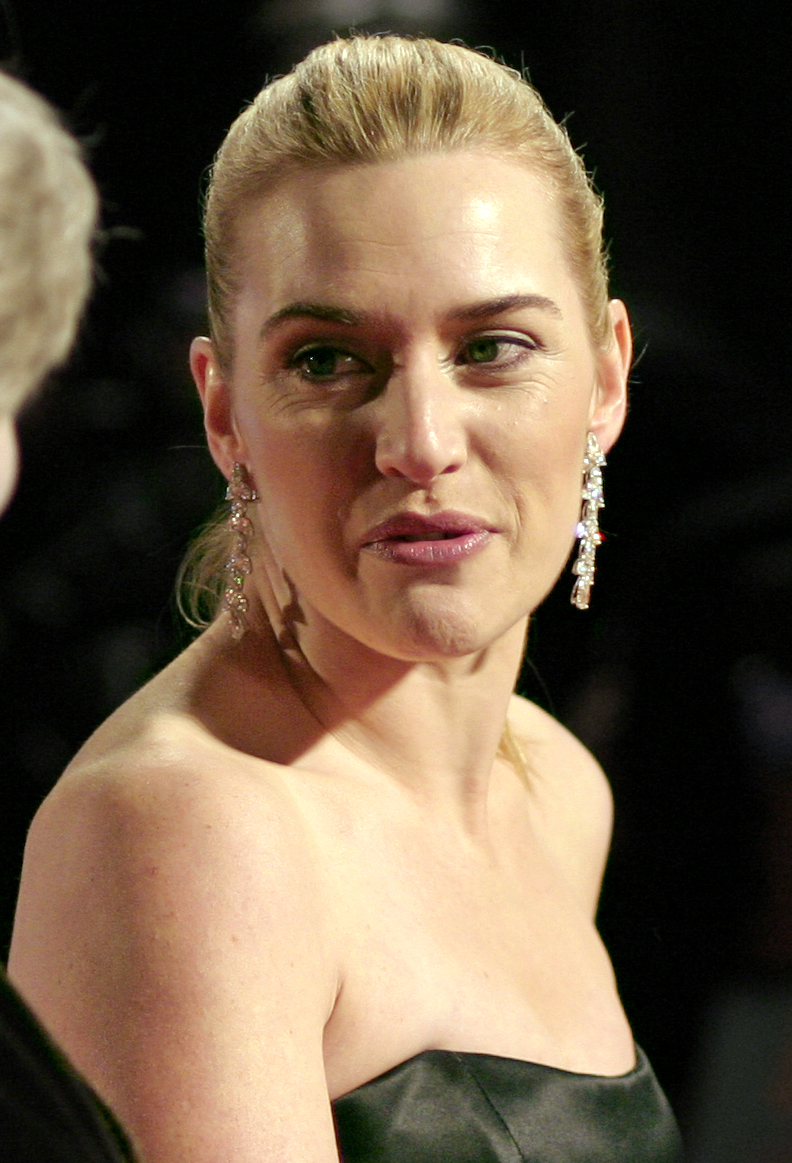
Kate Winslet's performance garnered widespread critical acclaim.

Mildred Pierce received generally favorable reviews. On Rotten Tomatoes it has an approval rating of 81% based on reviews from 58 critics, with an average rating of 8.3/10. The website's critics consensus reads, "Loyal to its source material to a fault, Mildred Pierce compensates for its familiarity with elaborate production values and a knockout lead performance." At Metacritic, the miniseries has a weighted average score of 69, based on 28 reviews, which indicates "generally favorable reviews". In a WBEZ podcast on the best theatrical films of 2011, critic Jonathan Rosenbaum used the series as an example of television work that was on par with the year's best movies, calling it Haynes' best work to date. Salon.com called it a "quiet, heartbreaking masterpiece", while The New York Times reviewer, Alessandra Stanley, commented that while the miniseries was "loyally, unwaveringly true to James M. Cain's 1941 novel", it did not "make the most of the mythic clash of mother, lover and ungrateful child", and was "not nearly as satisfying as the 1945 film noir".

Novelist Stephen King, reviewing Mildred Pierce for The Daily Beast and Newsweek, praised the acting of Winslet, Pearce and Wood, and admired the show's attention to detail and structure, but complained that the five-hour adaptation was "too damn long". He finishes with, "Winslet’s Mildred is a genuine star turn. How Joan Crawford would have loathed her."

The series was shown out of competition at the 68th Venice International Film Festival in 2011.

=== Ratings ===
Episode(s)	Date	Viewers
Parts 1 & 2	March 27, 2011	1.270 million
Part 3	April 3, 2011	0.987 million
Parts 4 & 5	April 10, 2011	0.964 million

== Awards and nominations ==
Year	Award	Category	Nominee(s)	Result	Ref.
2011	Artios Awards	Outstanding Achievement in Casting – Television Movie/Mini Series	Laura Rosenthal	Won	
2011	Online Film & Television Association Awards	Best Motion Picture or Miniseries		Won	
2011	Online Film & Television Association Awards	Best Actress in a Motion Picture or Miniseries	Kate Winslet	Won	
2011	Online Film & Television Association Awards	Best Supporting Actor in a Motion Picture or Miniseries	Guy Pearce	Nominated	
2011	Online Film & Television Association Awards	Best Supporting Actress in a Motion Picture or Miniseries	Melissa Leo	Nominated	
2011	Online Film & Television Association Awards	Best Supporting Actress in a Motion Picture or Miniseries	Evan Rachel Wood	Won (Note: Tied with Maggie Smith for Downton Abbey.)	
2011	Online Film & Television Association Awards	Best Direction of a Motion Picture or Miniseries	Todd Haynes	Won	
2011	Online Film & Television Association Awards	Best Writing of a Motion Picture or Miniseries	Todd Haynes and Jon Raymond	Won	
2011	Online Film & Television Association Awards	Best Ensemble in a Motion Picture or Miniseries		Won	
2011	Online Film & Television Association Awards	Best Cinematography in a Non-Series		Won	
2011	Online Film & Television Association Awards	Best Costume Design in a Non-Series		Won	
2011	Online Film & Television Association Awards	Best Editing in a Non-Series		Nominated	
2011	Online Film & Television Association Awards	Best Makeup/Hairstyling in a Non-Series		Nominated	
2011	Online Film & Television Association Awards	Best Music in a Non-Series		Won	
2011	Online Film & Television Association Awards	Best New Titles Sequence		Nominated	
2011	Online Film & Television Association Awards	Best Production Design in a Non-Series		Won	
2011	Online Film & Television Association Awards	Best Sound in a Non-Series		Nominated	
2011	Primetime Emmy Awards	Outstanding Limited or Anthology Series	Christine Vachon, Pamela Koffler, John Wells, Todd Haynes, and Ilene S. Landress	Nominated	
2011	Primetime Emmy Awards	Outstanding Lead Actress in a Miniseries or a Movie	Kate Winslet	Won	
2011	Primetime Emmy Awards	Outstanding Supporting Actor in a Miniseries or a Movie	Brían F. O'Byrne	Nominated	
2011	Primetime Emmy Awards	Outstanding Supporting Actor in a Miniseries or a Movie	Guy Pearce	Won	
2011	Primetime Emmy Awards	Outstanding Supporting Actress in a Miniseries or a Movie	Melissa Leo	Nominated	
2011	Primetime Emmy Awards	Outstanding Supporting Actress in a Miniseries or a Movie	Mare Winningham	Nominated	
2011	Primetime Emmy Awards	Outstanding Supporting Actress in a Miniseries or a Movie	Evan Rachel Wood	Nominated	
2011	Primetime Emmy Awards	Outstanding Directing for a Miniseries or Movie	Todd Haynes	Nominated	
2011	Primetime Emmy Awards	Outstanding Writing for a Miniseries or Movie	Todd Haynes and Jon Raymond	Nominated	
2011	Primetime Creative Arts Emmy Awards	Outstanding Art Direction for a Miniseries or Movie	Mark Friedberg, Peter Rogness, and Ellen Christiansen-De Jonge	Won	
2011	Primetime Creative Arts Emmy Awards	Outstanding Casting for a Miniseries or Movie	Laura Rosenthal	Won	
2011	Primetime Creative Arts Emmy Awards	Outstanding Cinematography for a Miniseries or Movie	Edward Lachman (for "Part 5")	Nominated	
2011	Primetime Creative Arts Emmy Awards	Outstanding Costumes for a Miniseries, Movie or a Special	Ann Roth, Michelle Matland, and Patrick Wiley (for "Part 2")	Nominated	
2011	Primetime Creative Arts Emmy Awards	Outstanding Hairstyling for a Miniseries or a Movie	Jerry DeCarlo and Jerry Popolis	Nominated	
2011	Primetime Creative Arts Emmy Awards	Outstanding Makeup (Non-Prosthetic)	Patricia Regan and Linda Melazzo	Nominated	
2011	Primetime Creative Arts Emmy Awards	Outstanding Music Composition for a Miniseries, Movie or a Special (Original Dramatic Score)	Carter Burwell (for "Part 5")	Won	
2011	Primetime Creative Arts Emmy Awards	Outstanding Original Main Title Theme Music	Carter Burwell	Nominated	
2011	Primetime Creative Arts Emmy Awards	Outstanding Picture Editing for a Miniseries or a Movie	Camilla Toniolo (for "Part 4")	Nominated	
2011	Primetime Creative Arts Emmy Awards	Outstanding Sound Editing for a Miniseries, Movie or a Special	Eliza Paley, Tony Martinez, Thomas O'Neil Younkman, Brian Dunlop, Todd Kasow, and Ellen Heuer (for "Part 5")	Nominated	
2011	Primetime Creative Arts Emmy Awards	Outstanding Sound Mixing for a Miniseries or a Movie	Drew Kunin, Leslie Shatz, Bobby Johanson, and Joshua Reinhardt (for "Part 5")	Nominated	
2011	Primetime Creative Arts Emmy Awards	Outstanding Special Visual Effects for a Miniseries, Movie or a Special	Lesley Robson-Foster, John Bair, Renuka Ballal, Nathan Meier, Constance Conrad, Marci Ichimura, Josephine Noh, Aaron Raff, and Scott Winston (for "Part 5")	Nominated	
2011	Satellite Awards	Best Miniseries or Motion Picture Made for Television		Won	
2011	Satellite Awards	Best Actress in a Miniseries or a Motion Picture Made for Television	Kate Winslet	Won	
2011	Satellite Awards	Best Actor in a Supporting Role in a Series, Miniseries or Motion Picture; Made for Television	Guy Pearce	Nominated	
2011	Satellite Awards	Best Actress in a Supporting Role in a Series, Miniseries or Motion Picture; Made for Television	Evan Rachel Wood	Nominated	
2011	Television Critics Association Awards	Outstanding Achievement in Movies, Miniseries and Specials		Nominated	
2011	Women's Image Network Awards	Actress Made for Television Movie	Kate Winslet	Nominated	
2011	Women's Image Network Awards	Actress Made for Television Movie	Evan Rachel Wood	Nominated	
2012	American Cinema Editors Awards	Best Edited Miniseries or Motion Picture for Television	Affonso Gonçalves (for "Part 1")	Nominated	
2012	American Society of Cinematographers Awards	Outstanding Achievement in Cinematography in Motion Picture/Miniseries Television	Edward Lachman (for "Part 5")	Nominated	
2012	Art Directors Guild Awards	Excellence in Production Design Award – Television Movie or Mini-Series	Mark Friedberg, Deborah Jensen, Peter Rogness, Kim Jennings, Michael Auszura, I. Javier Ameijeiras, Mark Pollard, Don Nace, and Ellen Christiansen	Won	
2012	Cinema Audio Society Awards	Outstanding Achievement in Sound Mixing for Television Movies and Mini-Series	Drew Kunin, Leslie Shatz, and Todd Whitelock (for "Part 5")	Nominated	
2012	Costume Designers Guild Awards	Outstanding Made for Television Movie or Miniseries	Ann Roth	Nominated	
2012	Dorian Awards	TV Drama of the Year		Nominated	
2012	Dorian Awards	TV Performance of the Year	Kate Winslet	Nominated	
2012	Golden Globe Awards	Best Miniseries or Television Film		Nominated	
2012	Golden Globe Awards	Best Actress – Miniseries or Television Film	Kate Winslet	Won	
2012	Golden Globe Awards	Best Supporting Actor – Series, Miniseries or Television Film	Guy Pearce	Nominated	
2012	Golden Globe Awards	Best Supporting Actress – Series, Miniseries or Television Film	Evan Rachel Wood	Nominated	
2012	Guild of Music Supervisors Awards	Best Music Supervision for Television Long Form and Movie	Evyen Klean (Note: Also for Cinema Verite, The Sunset Limited, and Too Big to Fail.)	Won	
2012	Producers Guild of America Awards	David L. Wolper Award for Outstanding Producer of Long-Form Television	Todd Haynes, Pamela Koffler, Ilene S. Landress, and Christine Vachon	Nominated	
2012	Screen Actors Guild Awards	Outstanding Performance by a Male Actor in a Television Movie or Miniseries	Guy Pearce	Nominated	
2012	Screen Actors Guild Awards	Outstanding Performance by a Female Actor in a Television Movie or Miniseries	Kate Winslet	Won	
2012	Writers Guild of America Awards	Long Form – Adapted	Todd Haynes and Jon Raymond; Based on the book by James M. Cain	Nominated	
2012	Young Artist Awards	Best Performance in a TV Movie, Miniseries or Special – Supporting Young Actress	Quinn McColgan	Nominated	
2012	Young Artist Awards	Best Performance in a TV Movie, Miniseries or Special – Supporting Young Actress	Morgan Turner	Nominated	

== See also ==
- List of Primetime Emmy Awards received by HBO
