= Swoon (film) =

1992 film by Tom Kalin

- Theatrical release poster
- Directed by: Tom Kalin
- Written by: Tom Kalin
- Produced by: Christine Vachon
- Starring: Craig Chester; Daniel Schlachet; Michael Kirby; Michael Stumm; Ron Vawter
- Cinematography: Ellen Kuras
- Edited by: Tom Kalin
- Music by: James Bennett
- Production companies: American Playhouse Theatrical Films; Intolerance Productions; Killer Films
- Distributed by: Fine Line Features
- Release dates: January 23, 1992 (Sundance); September 11, 1992 (United States)
- Running time: 93 minutes
- Country: United States
- Language: English
- Budget: $250,000 (estimated)

Swoon is a 1992 American crime drama film written, directed, and edited by Tom Kalin in his feature directorial debut. It stars Craig Chester and Daniel Schlachet, with Michael Kirby, Michael Stumm, and Ron Vawter in supporting roles. It recounts the 1924 Leopold and Loeb murder case, focusing more on the homosexuality of the killers than other films based on the case. Swoon is considered an integral part of the New Queer Cinema movement.

== Plot ==
A dramatization of the infamous Leopold and Loeb murder of 1924. Teenagers Nathan Leopold Jr. and Richard Loeb spend afternoons breaking into storefronts and engaging in petty crimes, until the calculating Nathan ups the ante by kidnapping, and murdering, a young boy. When the body is found, all evidence leads to Nathan and Richard, whose relationship makes the case one of the most talked-about trials of the 1920s.

== Cast ==
- Daniel Schlachet as Richard Loeb
- Craig Chester as Nathan Leopold Jr.
- Ron Vawter as State's Attorney Crowe
- Michael Kirby as Detective Savage
- Michael Stumm as Doctor Bowman
- Valda Z. Drabla as Germaine Reinhardt
- Natalie Stanford as Susan Lurie
- Glenn Backes as James Day

== Production ==
The film was produced by Christine Vachon for Intolerance and directed by Tom Kalin, who also co‑wrote the screenplay with Hilton Als. Ellen Kuras served as cinematographer, with editing by Kalin and production design by Therese Deprez. The score was composed by James Bennett.

== Premiere and release ==
The film had its world premiere at the Sundance Film Festival on January 23, 1992, where it won Best Cinematography. It was theatrically released in the United States on September 11, 1992, by Fine Line Features. It won two awards at the Berlin International Film Festival and received four Independent Spirit Award nominations.

== Reception ==
The Los Angeles Times’ Michael Wilmington wrote that Swoon is a black‑and‑white drama about desire and crime. He added that the film uses a noir style and shows the "homophobia" surrounding the case.

The New York Times’ Janet Maslin noted that Swoon challenges familiar "assumptions" about the Leopold and Loeb story, and wrote that its black‑and‑white style and its direct engagement with "prejudice" shape the film’s overall tone.

Richard Brody of The New Yorker described Swoon as "a crucial work of New Queer Cinema," noting its black‑and‑white style. He also wrote that the film uses graphic framing and media‑based devices.

David Thomson of The Guardian’s review called the film a strong take on the Leopold and Loeb story, presented in black‑and‑white. He mentioned that the film focuses on the pair’s relationship and the period’s fears about "unhealthy" sexuality.

== Legacy ==
Screen Daily describes Christine Vachon as "an architect of new independent cinema," with early 1990s films like Todd Haynes’ Poison and Tom Kalin’s Swoon among the works she became known for.

== Awards ==
Year	Festival	Category	Result
1992	Berlin International Film Festival	Caligari Film Award	Won
1992	Berlin International Film Festival	Best Feature – Tom Kalin	Won
1992	Sundance Film Festival	Cinematography Award (Dramatic) – Ellen Kuras	Won
1992	Sundance Film Festival	Grand Jury Prize	Nominated
1992	Gotham Awards	Open Palm Award – Tom Kalin	Won
1992	Stockholm International Film Festival	FIPRESCI Prize for Best Feature	Won
1992	Stockholm International Film Festival	Audience Award	Won
1993	Independent Spirit Awards	Best Cinematography – Ellen Kuras	Nominated
1993	Independent Spirit Awards	Best Director – Tom Kalin	Nominated
1993	Independent Spirit Awards	Best First Feature	Nominated
1993	Independent Spirit Awards	Best Male Lead – Craig Chester	Nominated
1993	Fantasporto	Directors' Week Award – Tom Kalin	Won
