= Crime and Punishment in Suburbia =

2000 film by Rob Schmidt

- Theatrical release poster
- Directed by: Rob Schmidt
- Written by: Larry Gross
- Based on: Crime and Punishment by Fyodor Dostoevsky
- Produced by: Pamela Koffler; Larry Gross; Christine Vachon
- Starring: Monica Keena; Vincent Kartheiser; Jeffrey Wright; James DeBello; Michael Ironside; Ellen Barkin
- Cinematography: Bobby Bukowski
- Edited by: Gabriel Wrye
- Music by: Michael Brook
- Production company: Killer Films
- Distributed by: MGM Distribution Co. (through United Artists)
- Release dates: January 24, 2000 (Sundance); September 15, 2000 (United States)
- Running time: 98 minutes
- Country: United States
- Language: English
- Box office: $26,394

Crime and Punishment in Suburbia (stylized as Crime + Punishment in Suburbia) is a 2000 American crime drama film directed by Rob Schmidt, written by Larry Gross, and starring Monica Keena, Vincent Kartheiser, Jeffrey Wright, James DeBello, Michael Ironside and Ellen Barkin. The film is a contemporary fable loosely based on Fyodor Dostoevsky's 1866 novel Crime and Punishment, and focuses on a high school student who plots to murder her stepfather after he brutally rapes her.

The film premiered at the 2000 Sundance Film Festival before being given a limited theatrical release by United Artists in September of that year. It received generally negative reviews from critics and grossed $26,394 at the United States box office.

== Plot ==
Roseanne Skolnick is outwardly a perfect and popular high school senior in Southern California, but she suffers from a dysfunctional home life: Her mother Maggie is unsatisfied in her marriage to Roseanne's alcoholic stepfather, Fred, who has raised Roseanne since age four. At school, Roseanne is an object of fascination to Vincent, an obsessive outcast who is often bullied by Roseanne's boyfriend, Jimmy. Though she is aware of Vincent's fixation with her, Roseanne largely ignores it.

After Maggie begins an affair with local bartender Chris, she moves out of the family's suburban home, leaving Roseanne to temporarily live with Fred. One night, Fred rapes Roseanne in a drunken rage, leaving her emotionally withdrawn. Maggie visits Roseanne after she suffers a nervous breakdown in school, but she conceals the rape from her mother. Roseanne forms a plot to murder Fred, and asks Jimmy to help her, but also refuses to inform Jimmy of the rape.

One night during a party, Roseanne briefly returns home with Jimmy to carry out the murder. In the living room, the two confront Fred, and Roseanne stabs him in the stomach. A fight breaks out in which Fred attempts to strangle Jimmy, but Roseanne finally kills Fred by stabbing him multiple times with an electric knife. While the couple flee the house to dispose of evidence and return to the party, Maggie arrives at the house and finds Fred's bloody corpse.

Maggie is charged with Fred's murder, though she professes her innocence. Meanwhile, Roseanne goes to live with her grandmother and becomes an outcast in school. She and Jimmy's relationship swiftly grows frayed due to their shared guilt over Fred's murder. Roseanne slowly finds herself drawn to Vincent, who continues to pursue a connection with her. As Maggie's trial progresses, Roseanne and Vincent form a close bond, much to Jimmy's anger.

One night, Jimmy gets drunk in a local bar, and is observed by Chris, who offers to give him a ride home. Meanwhile, Roseanne and Vincent stop at a gas station. While Vincent is inside the convenience store, Roseanne finds photographs of herself and Jimmy from the night they murdered Fred, proving that Vincent was stalking her and knew about the crime. She believes Vincent intends to blackmail her, but he insists her decision to face punishment for her crime is her own. Chris and Jimmy happen to drive past, and Chris stops his car after seeing Roseanne and Vincent fighting. As Chris chastises Roseanne, a fight breaks out between him and Jimmy. Chris's gun discharges, shooting Jimmy. Chris flees the scene, and Jimmy narrowly survives his injuries.

Roseanne ultimately confesses to Fred's murder and is given a manslaughter sentence, while Jimmy is never formally charged. She remains estranged from her mother while in prison, but is often visited by Vincent. At the end of her sentence, Vincent arrives to pick her up on his motorcycle, and the two drive away.

== Cast ==
- Monica Keena as Roseanne Skolnick
- Ellen Barkin as Maggie Skolnick
- Michael Ironside as Fred Skolnick
- Vincent Kartheiser as Vincent
- James DeBello as Jimmy
- Jeffrey Wright as Chris
- Conchata Ferrell as Bella
- Marshall Teague as Coach
- Nicki Aycox as Cecil
- Christian Payne as Dean
- Brad Greenquist as Calvin Berry

== Production ==
Rob Schmidt said that the film is a very loose adaptation of Fyodor Dostoevsky's 1866 novel Crime and Punishment. "The main character kills a terrible person, conceals the crime, is consumed by it, suffers secretly, confesses and in a spiritual way is reborn. It's just that it takes place in a California high school instead of Siberia," he said. Larry Gross had first written the script in the early 1990s, but it languished on a shelf until a run of high school films became popular in the last half of the decade. The film's original title was Crime and Punishment in High School, but this was changed after the Columbine High School massacre happened on April 20, 1999.

The film was shot in the summer of 1999 and was in production by June 28. In her book A Killer Life: How an Independent Film Producer Survives Deals and Disasters in Hollywood and Beyond, producer Christine Vachon detailed the problematic shoot of the film, which was the independent film production company Killer Films' first studio-backed movie, with bickering and threatening letters between the director and the writer, the director alienating the studio, and the film eventually getting dumped.

== Soundtrack ==
Crime + Punishment In Suburbia (Original United Artists Motion Picture Soundtrack)

Soundtrack album
- Released: August 22, 2000
- Genres: Soundtrack album; alternative rock; indie rock
- Length: 41:05
- Label: Milan Records

No.	Title	Artist	Length
1.	"Trailer Trash"	Modest Mouse	5:47
2.	"Bullet"	Frank Black	2:32
3.	"Monkey Gone to Heaven"	Far	5:02
4.	"This Family"	Magnapop	3:28
5.	"Two Rivers"	Meat Puppets	3:21
6.	"Damaged Little Fuckers"	Joey Santiago	2:03
7.	"Burn, Don't Freeze"	Sleater-Kinney	3:15
8.	"Sand"	OP8	4:38
9.	"Mister Love"	Toadies	2:51
10.	"High School Cannibal Party"	Sound Furnace	1:49
11.	"Sinnerman"	Extra Fancy	4:03
12.	"Learning to Hunt"	Guided by Voices	2:25

== Release ==
Crime and Punishment in Suburbia was selected to compete for the Grand Jury Prize Dramatic at the 2000 Sundance Film Festival, where it had its world premiere on January 24, 2000. It was given a limited theatrical release in the United States by United Artists Films on September 15, 2000.

=== Home media ===
Crime and Punishment in Suburbia was released by MGM Home Entertainment on DVD in January 2001, and on Blu-ray on August 29, 2023.

== Reception ==
=== Box office ===
In the United States, Crime and Punishment in Suburbia had an opening weekend of $10,000 from five theaters. By the end of its run, it grossed a total of $26,394.

=== Critical response ===
On the review aggregator website Rotten Tomatoes, the film holds an approval rating of 21% based on 29 reviews, and an average rating of 3.7/10. The site's critical consensus reads, "Despite the beautiful visuals, Crime and Punishment is too somber and pretentious. Also, the acting is of mixed quality." On Metacritic, the film has a weighted average score of 32 out of 100, based on 14 critics, indicating "generally unfavorable" reviews.

Roger Ebert awarded the film three stars and wrote, "Crime and Punishment in Suburbia is no doubt 'flawed'–that favorite moviecrit word–and it suffers from being released a year after the similar 'American Beauty,' even though it was made earlier. But it is the kind of movie that lives and breathes; I forgive its shortcomings because it strives, and because it contains excellent things."

Time Out said director Rob Schmidt draws out "assured performances from Keena's good-girl-gone-bad and Kartheiser's black-clad loner", but concluded the film is a "rare disappointment from maverick indie producer Christine Vachon" and "this story of festering psychosis beneath the placid surface of everyday US suburbia looks familiar."

=== Accolades ===
The film was nominated for the Grand Jury Prize for Dramatic Feature at the 2000 Sundance Film Festival.
