= Glass Elevator Media =

Glass Elevator Media is an American media company, started by entrepreneur Adrienne Becker. In 2014, Glass Elevator merged with Killer Films and acquired technology company Viewur to form Killer Content, Inc. Union Editorial joined with a group of private investors to fund Killer Content." As of 2014, Glass Elevator has about a dozen Web, TV, and film projects in the works including a film based on the best-selling novel, This Beautiful Life, by Helen Schulman, to be co-produced with Killer Films.
