= Virginia (2010 film) =

- Theatrical release poster
- Directed by: Dustin Lance Black
- Written by: Dustin Lance Black
- Produced by: Scott J. Brooks; Hopwood DePree; Christine Vachon
- Starring: Jennifer Connelly; Ed Harris; Emma Roberts; Carrie Preston; Toby Jones
- Cinematography: Eric Alan Edwards
- Edited by: John David Allen; Beatrice Sisul
- Music by: Nick Urata
- Production companies: TicTock Studios; Killer Films
- Distributed by: Entertainment One
- Release dates: September 15, 2010 (TIFF); May 18, 2012 (United States)
- Running time: 116 minutes
- Country: United States
- Language: English
- Box office: $12,728

Virginia (originally titled What's Wrong with Virginia) is a 2010 film written and directed by Dustin Lance Black and starring Jennifer Connelly, Ed Harris, Emma Roberts, Carrie Preston, and Toby Jones.

== Plot ==
In a small town, mentally unstable Virginia has a two-decade affair with a local married sheriff, Dick Tipton. Her son Emmett acts as her protector. During Emmett's quest for the truth of his father's identity, he begins a relationship with Tipton's daughter Jessie.

== Cast ==
- Jennifer Connelly as Virginia
- Ed Harris as Sheriff Richard "Dick" Tipton
- Emma Roberts as Jessie Tipton
- Harrison Gilbertson as Emmett
- Amy Madigan as Roseanna Tipton
- Carrie Preston as Betty
- Toby Jones as Max
- Alex Frost as Josh
- Yeardley Smith as Mrs. Whitaker
- Paul Walter Hauser as Dale

== Production ==
The film was shot in West Michigan (Holland, Grand Haven, South Haven, Saugatuck, Zeeland) during fall of 2009 in seven weeks on local streets, homes, and businesses. The project was filmed in Michigan, the decision having been taken to film there due to a state program offering incentives to the entertainment industry. To create Virginia's style, Dustin Lance Black requested Jennifer Connelly's advice to design the set of the character's house, as well as the selection of wardrobe she uses through the film.

Throughout filming and for its premiere at the TIFF, the film was titled What's Wrong With Virginia. Black re-cut the film following its poor initial reception, and it was subsequently re-titled Virginia for theatrical release. IndieWire quoted Black as saying that the film "was pretty bad. So I opened up the edit and got a new editor and went back to script and finishing that film."

== Release ==
The film was first shown on September 15, 2010 at the Toronto International Film Festival (TIFF).

On January 17, 2012, Variety announced that Entertainment One have acquired North American distribution rights to Virginia. The film premièred in U.S theaters on May 18, 2012.

== Reception ==
On review aggregator Rotten Tomatoes, the film holds an approval rating of 11% based on 27 reviews, with an average rating of 4.35/10. The website's critics consensus reads: "Brave, autobiographical, but also completely off the mark, Virginia is a frantic drama that fails to pull the viewer in." On Metacritic, the film has a weighted average score of 33 out of 100, based on 14 critics, indicating "generally unfavorable reviews".

While noting that the film was "propped up by a strong central performance" from Jennifer Connelly, Katey Rich of Cinema Blend reported that it was "all over the place in every imaginable way." The Hollywood Reporter felt that "the film is tonally all over the place, eventually settling in a rut that comes a lot closer to resembling bad camp than edgy satire." Screen International similarly found the film tonally confused, writing that "the screenplay becomes as busy and overloaded as a packed roller-coaster, testing the viewer’s patience along the way and offering little in the way of a payoff."

Several of the reviewers who saw the film at TIFF singled out Connelly's acting for praise. Rich wrote that "Connelly has rarely looked more fragile or dangerous; like Virginia she's adrift in a world that doesn't quite appreciate her, and just as you root for Virginia to pull it together and leave town, you root for Connelly to track down a better movie." Chase Whale of Gordon and the Whale wrote that "Jennifer Connelly is normally the bombshell and that's still here, but her comedic elements come into full fruition which loses a little bit of the sex appeal and adds more of the "this girl got herself acting chops" appeal."
