= The Last Day (2026 film) =

American drama film

- Directed by: Rachel Rose
- Screenplay by: Rachel Rose
- Produced by: Lucie Elwes; Rachel Rose; Mason Plotts; David Kaplan; Christine Vachon; Pamela Koffler
- Starring: Alicia Vikander; Victoria Pedretti; Wagner Moura
- Cinematography: Eric Yue
- Edited by: Taylor Levy
- Music by: Drum & Lace
- Production companies: Kaplan Morrison; Luma Projects; Killer Films
- Release date: June 6, 2026 (Tribeca)
- Running time: 99 minutes
- Country: United States
- Language: English

The Last Day is a 2026 American drama film written and directed by Rachel Rose and starring Alicia Vikander, Victoria Pedretti and Wagner Moura.

== Premise ==
On the Fourth of July in New York, Julia, a writer and mother, encounters figures from her past and a troubled young mother, prompting her to confront her lack of creative purpose and rediscover herself within the life she has.

== Cast ==
- Alicia Vikander as Julia
- Wagner Moura as Peter
- Victoria Pedretti as Taylor
- Marin Ireland as Ellen
- Jihae as Olivia
- Michael Patrick Thornton as John
- Michael Stahl-David as Ben
- Maria Dizzia as Diana
- Deborah Hedwell as Rochelle
- Sinclair Daniel as Maggie
- Conrad Ricamora as Finn
- Francis Benhamou as Dr. Haddad
- Ezra Barnes as Dr. Gottman

== Production ==
The film is produced by Killer Films, and is loosely adapted from Virginia Woolf's novel Mrs Dalloway. The film marks the directorial debut of Rachel Rose. The cast is led by Alicia Vikander and Victoria Pedretti. It is produced by Lucie Elwes, Rose, Mason Plotts, Pamela Koffler and Christine Vachon of Killer Films. It is executive produced by Maja Hoffmann and Lucas Hoffmann of Luma Projects.

Principal photography took place in New York and wrapped in October 2024.

== Release ==
The Last Day premiered at the Tribeca Festival on June 6, 2026.

== Reception ==
On review aggregator website Rotten Tomatoes, the film holds an approval rating of 91% based on 11 reviews, with an average rating of 7.9/10.
