= Pretty Babies =

2026 American drama film

- Directed by: Tyler-Marie Evans
- Written by: Tyler-Marie Evans
- Produced by: Christine Vachon; Jordan Wagner; Ashley Benson
- Starring: Ashley Benson; Emily Alyn Lind; Madelaine Petsch; Sadie Stanley
- Cinematography: Lauren Guiteras
- Edited by: Benjamin Rodriguez Jr.
- Music by: Romano Molino Dunn
- Production companies: Killer Films; Wagner Entertainment
- Release date: August 14, 2026 (Edinburgh)
- Running time: 92 minutes
- Country: United States
- Language: English

Pretty Babies is a 2026 American drama film written and directed by Tyler-Marie Evans in her directorial debut. It stars Ashley Benson, Emily Alyn Lind, Madelaine Petsch and Sadie Stanley.

The film had its world premiere at the Edinburgh International Film Festival on August 14, 2026.

== Premise ==
Two teenage girls chase their dreams of becoming actresses by traveling to Hollywood but their dreams lead them to the dark underbelly of the sex work industry.

== Cast ==
- Ashley Benson as Sapphire
- Emily Alyn Lind as Marie
- Madelaine Petsch as Gemma
- Sadie Stanley as Luna
- Elias Kacavas
- DeVaughn Nixon
- Wyatt Yang
- Simon Roszak

== Production ==
In July 2025, it was announced Ashley Benson, Emily Alyn Lind, Madelaine Petsch and Sadie Stanley had joined the cast of the film, with Tyler-Marie Evans making her directorial debut. Christine Vachon produced under her Killer Films banner, with Benson also serving as a producer. Principal photography commenced in Oklahoma. In September 2025, Elias Kacavas, DeVaughn Nixon, Wyatt Yang, and Simon Roszak joined the cast.

== Release ==
It had its world premiere at the Edinburgh International Film Festival on August 14, 2026.
