= Fleur (film) =

Upcoming film

- Directed by: Ellie Foumbi
- Written by: Ellie Foumbi
- Produced by: Christine Vachon; Halle Berry; Holly Jeter; Gabriel Mayers
- Starring: Halle Berry; Matthias Schoenaerts; Makita Samba; Marton Csokas; Liza Colón-Zayas
- Production companies: AGC Studios; Killer Films; Davis Films; HalleHolly; Plot Twist Pictures
- Distributed by: Metropolitan Filmexport (France)
- Countries: United States; France
- Language: English

Fleur is an upcoming drama film written and directed by Ellie Foumbi. It stars Halle Berry, Matthias Schoenaerts, Makita Samba, Marton Csokas and Liza Colón-Zayas.

== Cast ==
- Halle Berry as Fleur
- Matthias Schoenaerts
- Makita Samba
- Marton Csokas
- Liza Colón-Zayas

== Production ==
In August 2025, it was announced Halle Berry had joined the cast of the film, with Ellie Foumbi directing from a screenplay she wrote. AGC Studios will finance and produce, with Killer Films and Berry additionally attached to produce. In March 2026, Matthias Schoenaerts, Makita Samba and Marton Csokas joined the cast of the film, with principal photography commencing in Paris. In April 2026, Liza Colón-Zayas joined the cast of the film.
