= Lone Wolf (upcoming film) =

Upcoming film by Mark Pellington

- Directed by: Mark Pellington
- Written by: Tom Chilcoat
- Produced by: Ted Hope; Christine Vachon; Jordan Wagner
- Starring: Lily Gladstone; Bryan Cranston; O'Shea Jackson Jr.; Jennifer Ehle; Chet Hanks; Spencer Garrett
- Production companies: Double Hope; Killer Films; Wagner Entertainment
- Distributed by: Vertical
- Country: United States
- Language: English

Lone Wolf is an upcoming American action thriller film directed by Mark Pellington. It stars Lily Gladstone and Bryan Cranston.

== Cast ==
- Lily Gladstone
- Bryan Cranston
- O'Shea Jackson Jr.
- Jennifer Ehle
- Chet Hanks
- Spencer Garrett as Senator William Evans

== Production ==
The film was announced on October 30, 2024, with Lily Gladstone and Bryan Cranston starring. O'Shea Jackson Jr., Jennifer Ehle, Chet Hanks, and Spencer Garrett were announced as cast members on March 5, 2025.

Principal photography took place in Albuquerque, New Mexico. Facing financial difficulties, however, filming ceased in late February 2025, and it was later reported that crew members were owed over $1 million in unpaid wages. Cranston subsequently announced that he would not return to production or promote the film until the crew was paid for their work.
