= Gigantic (2008 film) =

- Theatrical release poster
- Directed by: Matt Aselton
- Written by: Matt Aselton; Adam Nagata
- Produced by: Mindy Goldberg; Christine Vachon
- Starring: Paul Dano; Zooey Deschanel; Edward Asner; Jane Alexander; John Goodman
- Cinematography: Peter Donahue
- Edited by: Beatrice Sisul
- Music by: Roddy Bottum
- Distributed by: First Independent Pictures
- Release dates: September 8, 2008 (TIFF); April 3, 2009 (United States)
- Running time: 98 minutes
- Country: United States
- Language: English
- Box office: $165,888

Gigantic is a 2008 independent comedy film directed by Matt Aselton and starring Paul Dano, Zooey Deschanel, John Goodman, Edward Asner and Jane Alexander. The script, written by Aselton and his college friend Adam Nagata, tells of Brian (Dano), a mattress salesman who wishes to adopt a baby from China, but finds himself sharing his passion with the quirky, wealthy Harriet (Deschanel) when they meet in his store. The story was based on Aselton's childhood wish for his parents to adopt a Chinese baby. The film was shot in New York and Connecticut. It had its world premiere at 2008's Toronto International Film Festival and was released in the United States on April 3, 2009.

== Premise ==
Young mattress salesman Brian decides to adopt a baby from China. Brian's life becomes more complicated and contemplative when he forms a relationship with quirky, wealthy Harriet, whom he meets at his mattress store.

== Cast ==
- Paul Dano as Brian Weathersby
- Zooey Deschanel as Harriet "Happy" Lolly
- John Goodman as Al Lolly
- Edward Asner as Mr. Weathersby
- Jane Alexander as Mrs. Weathersby
- Leven Rambin as Missy Thaxton
- Sharon Wilkins as Linda
- Zach Galifianakis as Homeless Guy
- Clarke Peters as Roger Stovall

== Production ==
Aselton said that, as the youngest child in his family, he wanted his parents to adopt a Chinese baby so that he could have a younger sibling; his younger brother did in fact adopt a baby later. He and co-writer Adam Nagata were fascinated by the idea and built the story around Brian's wanting to adopt a baby. Aselton and Nagata, college friends who both come from literary backgrounds, aimed to write the film as novelistic and surrealist rather than expository. They wanted to show "those little things that are often found in literature but rarely in film", such as Brian and his father's age difference and how it affects their relationship, and Harriet's walking around in her underpants and how it affects her and Brian's relationship. Aselton chose the title Gigantic because "There's an innocence about the [word]" due to its use by young children to describe something fantastic. He felt that the title was "a juxtaposition against Brian's life changing decision to adopt a baby".

The script languished for several years before the film went into production, when producer Mindy Goldberg brought the script to Christine Vachon of Killer Films. Aselton said the most challenging part of making the film was casting the two lead roles of Brian and Harriet. Paul Dano liked the script and was one of the first actors to sign on, which attracted others to join the cast. Aselton said that Dano was one of the first to audition for the role and the first to understand the story; Deschanel was the second actor to understand, and so both were cast. To prepare for his role, Dano talked to salesmen at Sleepy's, a mattress store, and bought Chinese language tapes to learn some of the language as his character did. Filming began on March 3, 2008 and lasted for 23 days. As a director of commercials, Aselton brought many of his former crew members with him to work on Gigantic. Most of production took place in Brooklyn and Manhattan but several scenes were filmed in Stamford, Connecticut and Los Angeles. Filming locations included Brooklyn Heights' Cadman Plaza West and Cobble Hill's Quercy restaurant. Scenes in the mattress store were filmed inside an abandoned warehouse, which cinematographer Peter Donahue described as "a big space with perfect texture on the walls and windows in the right places for motivated, practical light". Though the producers wanted to use 16 mm film because of the tight budget, Aselton and Donahue chose to use Super 35 format, mainly using medium-long lenses.

== Release ==
The film premiered at the Toronto International Film Festival on September 9, 2008. Following its screening at American Film Market, First Independent Pictures bought the film's North American distribution rights. The film was pre-screened at Vassar College in the fall of 2008. It was screened at the Cornell University Cinema on February 14, 2009 and in March at the Buenos Aires International Festival of Independent Cinema and the AFI Dallas International Film Festival, where it won the Target Filmmaker Award for Best Narrative Feature. It was given a limited theatrical release on April 3, 2009, coinciding with its showing at the Gen Art Film Festival.

== Reception ==
Rotten Tomatoes gives the film a 35% approval rating based on 82 reviews, with a weighted average of 4.57/10. The site's consensus reads: "This overly quirky, incessantly whimsical indie is too self-conscious for its own good". Metacritic, which uses a weighted average, assigned the film a score of 38 out of 100, based on 13 critics, indicating "generally unfavorable" reviews.

Slant Magazine called the film a "meager sum of quirky details" and gave it (½ out of four stars), though it complimented Dano's "fine performance." Stephen Holden called it a "serious comedy about the children of privilege...a cautiously surreal, absurdist movie" with a protagonist (played by Dano) who's a "close spiritual relative of the polite young men who drift through mumblecore films". The review concludes:

With its off-center dialogue and upscale industrial settings, Gigantic strains to be original. But beneath its indie affectations it is really another contemplation of generational misunderstanding. Instead of the passionate '60s and '70s rebels pursuing authenticity in the material world, or '80s and '90s nihilists flamboyantly self-destructing, the movie's meek lovebirds only want something worth their commitment.

The Village Voice called it "another flimsy indie comedy for the heap" with a "screenplay's per-page quota of 'unexpected' tweaks [that leave] little room for much else."

Gigantic earned $102,704 in gross revenue in its limited thirteen-week, eleven-theater release, with its one-theater opening weekend collecting $10,294 of that total. Worldwide, the film grossed $165,888.
