= Killer Films =

American independent film production company

- Industry: Film; Television
- Founded: 1995
- Founder: Christine Vachon; Pamela Koffler
- Headquarters: New York City, New York, United States
- Website: Killer Films

Killer Films is a New York City-based independent film production company founded in 1995 by film producers Christine Vachon and Pamela Koffler. The company has produced many acclaimed independent films over the past two decades including Far From Heaven (nominated for four Academy Awards), Boys Don't Cry (Academy Award winner), One Hour Photo, Kids, Hedwig and the Angry Inch, Happiness, Velvet Goldmine, Safe, I Shot Andy Warhol, Swoon, I'm Not There (Academy Award nominated), Kill Your Darlings, Still Alice (Academy Award winner) and Carol (nominated for six Academy Awards). Killer Films also executive produced Todd Haynes' five episode HBO miniseries Mildred Pierce, which went on to win five Emmys, a Golden Globe and a Screen Actors Guild Award.

In 2014, Killer Films merged with Glass Elevator Media to form Killer Content, Inc. Their logo consists of a rabbit with a dartboard for a body.

== Awards and recognition ==
Killer Films productions have received multiple awards and nominations from the Academy of Motion Picture Arts & Sciences, the Emmy Awards, the Hollywood Foreign Press Association and the Independent Spirit Awards. On the occasion of Killer's 10th anniversary in 2005, the company was feted with a retrospective at the Museum of Modern Art.

Christine Vachon's first feature production, Poison, directed by Todd Haynes, won the Grand Jury Prize at the 1991 Sundance Film Festival. Poison was one of the defining films of the emerging New Queer Cinema. For her work on Far From Heaven, another Todd Haynes collaboration, Vachon was honored by the New York Film Critics Circle, and received the Producer of the Year Award from the National Board of Review.

Vachon produced the Showtime television adaptation of the public broadcasting radio program, This American Life, for which she won an Emmy. In 2011, Christine was invited to give the State of Cinema Address at the San Francisco Film Society's 54th San Francisco International Film Festival.

Vachon has also written two books on her life and career, Shooting to Kill (1998), and A Killer Life (2006).

One of Killer's most recent films, Kill Your Darlings, directed by John Krokidas, and starred Daniel Radcliffe and Dane DeHaan, was selected for the Sundance Film Festival and went on to be nominated for the Grand Jury Prize. After producing Magic Magic, which debuted at the 2013 Sundance Film Festival to wide acclaim, Killer re-teamed with writer-director Sebastián Silva on his new feature, Nasty Baby.

In 2015, Julianne Moore won the Best Performance by an Actress Oscar for her part in the 2014 Killer film Still Alice, directed by Wash Westmoreland and Richard Glatzer, based on the novel of the same name, written by Lisa Genova. That same year, Killer re-teamed with director Todd Haynes on Carol, based on the 1952 romance novel, The Price of Salt, written by Patricia Highsmith. The film stars Cate Blanchett and Rooney Mara.

In 2017, the company produced Janicza Bravo's Lemon starring Brett Gelman and Judy Greer; Beatriz at Dinner starring Salma Hayek and Chloë Sevigny; and Dina directed by Dan Sickles & Antonio Santini, the latter of three winning the Documentary Grand Jury Prize at the 2017 Sundance Film Festival.

In May 2017, the company signed a two-year first look deal with Amazon Studios.

== Filmography ==
=== Film ===
| Year | Title | Worldwide box office | Notes |
|---|---|---|---|
| 1991 | Poison | $787,280 | |
| 1992 | Swoon | —N/a | |
| 1994 | Go Fish | $2.4 million | |
| 1994 | Postcards from America | —N/a | |
| 1995 | Safe | $512,245 | |
| 1995 | Kids | $7.4 million | |
| 1995 | Stonewall | $692,400 | |
| 1996 | Plain Pleasures | —N/a | |
| 1996 | I Shot Andy Warhol | $1.9 million | |
| 1997 | Bad Bosses Go to Hell | —N/a | Short film |
| 1997 | Office Killer | $76,054 | |
| 1998 | Happiness | $2.8 million | |
| 1998 | Velvet Goldmine | $1.1 million | |
| 1998 | I'm Losing You | $13,996 | |
| 1998 | Dark Harbor | —N/a | |
| 1999 | Boys Don't Cry | $11.5 million | Won one Academy Award |
| 2000 | Crime + Punishment in Suburbia | $26,394 | |
| 2001 | Series 7: The Contenders | $195,065 | |
| 2001 | Women in Film | —N/a | |
| 2001 | The Safety of Objects | $319,299 | |
| 2001 | Storytelling | $2 million | |
| 2001 | Hedwig and the Angry Inch | $3.6 million | |
| 2001 | The Grey Zone | $517,872 | |
| 2001 | Chelsea Walls | $60,902 | |
| 2002 | One Hour Photo | $52 million | |
| 2002 | Far From Heaven | $29 million | Nominated for four Academy Awards |
| 2003 | Party Monster | $742,898 | |
| 2003 | Camp | $2.6 million | |
| 2003 | The Company | $6.4 million | |
| 2004 | A Home at the End of the World | $1.5 million | |
| 2004 | A Dirty Shame | $1.9 million | |
| 2005 | The Notorious Bettie Page | $1.8 million | |
| 2006 | Infamous | $2.6 million | |
| 2007 | An American Crime | $1.3 million | |
| 2007 | Savage Grace | $1.4 million | |
| 2007 | I'm Not There | $11.7 million | Nominated for one Academy Award |
| 2007 | Then She Found Me | $8.4 million | |
| 2008 | Gigantic | $165,888 | |
| 2009 | Motherhood | $726,354 | |
| 2009 | Cracks | $29,683 | |
| 2009 | Cairo Time | $2 million | |
| 2010 | Lulu at the Ace Hotel | —N/a | Short film |
| 2010 | Loop Planes | —N/a | Short film |
| 2010 | Virginia | $12,728 | |
| 2010 | Dirty Girl | $55,125 | |
| 2011 | Dragonslayer | —N/a | |
| 2012 | Shut Up and Play the Hits | $629,107 | |
| 2012 | At Any Price | $380,594 | |
| 2013 | Magic Magic | —N/a | |
| 2013 | Kill Your Darlings | $2.1 million | |
| 2013 | Dealin' with Idiots | $17,909 | |
| 2013 | Deep Powder | —N/a | |
| 2013 | The Last of Robin Hood | $288,545 | |
| 2013 | WildLike | —N/a | |
| 2013 | Bluebird | —N/a | |
| 2014 | Young Bodies Heal Quickly | —N/a | |
| 2014 | Electric Slide | —N/a | |
| 2014 | Still Alice | $44 million | Won one Academy Award |
| 2014 | Mala Mala | $10,761 | |
| 2015 | Nasty Baby | $80,828 | |
| 2015 | Carol | $40.3 million | Nominated for nine British Academy Film Awards; Nominated for six Academy Awards; Nominated for five Golden Globe Awards |
| 2015 | Big Sky | —N/a | |
| 2016 | Woman in Deep | —N/a | Short film |
| 2016 | Goat | $23,020 | |
| 2016 | Wiener-Dog | $716,633 | |
| 2016 | White Girl | $200,242 | |
| 2016 | Frank & Lola | $9,188 | |
| 2016 | A Kind of Murder | $89,899 | |
| 2016 | London Town | $1,126 | |
| 2017 | Dina | $96,524 | |
| 2017 | Lemon | $29,528 | |
| 2017 | Where Is Kyra? | $59,717 | |
| 2017 | Beatriz at Dinner | $7.4 million | |
| 2017 | Wonderstruck | $3.3 million | |
| 2017 | My Days of Mercy | $18,766 | |
| 2017 | First Reformed | $3.9 million | Nominated for one Academy Award |
| 2018 | Colette | $13.8 million | |
| 2018 | Vox Lux | $1.4 million | |
| 2019 | American Woman | $245,416 | |
| 2019 | Inside the Rain | $8,140 | |
| 2019 | Dark Waters | $23.1 million | |
| 2020 | Zola | $4.5-5 million | |
| 2020 | Shirley | $305,805 | |
| 2020 | The World to Come | $204,797 | |
| 2020 | Brothers by Blood | $104,744 | |
| 2021 | The Velvet Underground | —N/a | |
| 2022 | Under the Influence | —N/a | |
| 2022 | Anything's Possible | —N/a | |
| 2023 | Past Lives | $42.5 million | Nominated for two Academy Awards |
| 2023 | She Came to Me | $1.2 million | |
| 2023 | Bleeding Love | $7,042 | |
| 2023 | A Good Person | $3.1 million | |
| 2023 | May December | $5.3 million | Nominated for one Academy Award |
| 2024 | A Different Man | $1.5 million | Nominated for one Academy Award |
| 2025 | Mad Bills to Pay (or Destiny, dile que no soy malo) | $67,909 | |
| 2025 | Materialists | $108 million | |
| 2025 | Late Fame | $640,517 | |
| 2026 | Barbara Forever | —N/a | |
| 2026 | The Last Day | TBA | |
| 2026 | Pretty Babies | TBA | |
| TBA | De Noche | TBA | |
| TBA | The Exiles | TBA | |
| TBA | Fleur | TBA | |
| TBA | Lone Wolf | TBA | |

=== Television ===
| Year | Title | Notes |
|---|---|---|
| 2005 | Mrs. Harris | TV movie Nominated for twelve Emmy Awards |
| 2007–2009 | This American Life | TV series Won three Emmy Awards |
| 2010 | The Neistat Brothers | TV series |
| 2011 | Mildred Pierce | TV miniseries Won five Emmy Awards |
| 2015–2017 | Z: The Beginning of Everything | TV series |
| 2018–2019 | This Close | TV series |
| 2021 | Halston | TV miniseries |
| 2021 | Pride | TV miniseries |

== See also ==
- New Queer Cinema
