= Postcards from America =

1994 film by Steve McLean

- US theatrical release poster
- Directed by: Steve McLean
- Written by: Steve McLean
- Based on: Close to the Knives and Memories That Smell Like Gasoline by David Wojnarowicz
- Produced by: Craig Paull; Christine Vachon
- Starring: James Lyons; Michael Tighe; Olmo Tighe; Michael Imperioli; Michael Ringer; Maggie Low
- Cinematography: Ellen Kuras
- Edited by: Elizabeth Gazzara
- Music by: Stephen Endelman
- Production companies: Normal; Islet; Channel Four Films
- Distributed by: Strand Releasing
- Release dates: 10 September 1994 (TIFF); 28 April 1995 (United Kingdom); 21 July 1995 (United States)
- Running time: 87 minutes
- Countries: United Kingdom; United States
- Language: English

Postcards from America (sometimes styled as Post Cards from America) is a 1994 drama film written and directed by Steve McLean, based on the memoirs Close to the Knives (1991) and Memories That Smell Like Gasoline (1992) by David Wojnarowicz. It has been described as an example of New Queer Cinema.

The nonlinear film presents sequences from three periods in the protagonist's life. The character, called only David, is portrayed by James Lyons in his adulthood, and by Michael Tighe and Olmo Tighe in his teenage and adolescent years.

== Production ==
This marked the first project on which Christine Vachon and Pamela Koffler both worked. Koffler served as post-production producer on this film; the pair would form Killer Films, which released its first film the following year.

Marc Maurino, the writer and executive producer of FreeRayshawn (2020), worked on the film as an intern.

== Release ==
Postcards from America premiered at the 1994 New York Film Festival. It was also screened at the Berlin, Sundance, and Toronto Film Festivals.

== Reception ==
Postcards from America was awarded the International Confederation of Art Cinemas award at the Berlin Film Festival.

The film received mixed to negative reviews upon release. Many reviews knocked the film for portraying "Wojnarowicz as a passive, inarticulate victim." Variety described it as "(a) downer without much compensatory insight or dramatic power" in which "McLean shuffles and deals the cards from his deck in a highly selective manner and leaves far too many of them face down." In a review for The Advocate, Emanuel Levy concluded that Postcards "a dispassionate, uninvolving film" that "may be drenched in too much style, making the experience even more fractured and remote." Adrian Martin called it "a depressingly poor attempt at making a vivid, iconoclastic, stream-of-consciousness movie about some rather grim, relentless and preening ideas."

One favorable review commended it for the use of scenes in which characters address the audience, saying the device was better-utilized in Postcards than in The Sum of Us.
