= Beatriz at Dinner =

2017 film by Miguel Arteta

- Theatrical release poster
- Directed by: Miguel Arteta
- Written by: Mike White
- Produced by: Aaron L. Gilbert; Pamela Koffler; David Hinojosa; Christine Vachon
- Starring: Salma Hayek; John Lithgow; Connie Britton; Jay Duplass; Amy Landecker; Chloë Sevigny; David Warshofsky
- Cinematography: Wyatt Garfield
- Edited by: Jay Deuby
- Music by: Mark Mothersbaugh
- Production companies: Bron Studios; Killer Films
- Distributed by: Roadside Attractions (United States); FilmNation Entertainment (United States); Elevation Pictures (Canada)
- Release dates: January 23, 2017 (Sundance); June 9, 2017 (United States); June 16, 2017 (Canada)
- Running time: 83 minutes
- Countries: United States; Canada
- Language: English
- Box office: $7.4 million

Beatriz at Dinner is a 2017 comedy-drama film directed by Miguel Arteta and written by Mike White. An international co-production between the United States and Canada, it stars Salma Hayek, John Lithgow, Connie Britton, Jay Duplass, Amy Landecker, Chloë Sevigny, and David Warshofsky. It follows a holistic medicine practitioner who attends a wealthy client's dinner party after her car breaks down.

The film had its world premiere at the Sundance Film Festival on January 23, 2017. It was theatrically released in the United States on June 9, by Roadside Attractions and FilmNation Entertainment, and in Canada on June 16, 2017, by Elevation Pictures. It received positive reviews from critics, who particularly praised the performances of Hayek and Lithgow. It grossed over $7.4 million worldwide, and was named one of the top 10 independent films of 2017 by the National Board of Review. At the 33rd Independent Spirit Awards, the film was nominated for Best Female Lead (for Hayek) and Best Screenplay (for White).

== Plot ==
The film opens with a woman rowing a boat in a mangrove swamp where she encounters a white goat on the shore. Next, Beatriz Blanco, a masseuse, is shown waking up at her Altadena home amongst her various animals. She heads off to a cancer treatment center in Santa Monica where she helps patients with alternative medicine.

After work, Beatriz drives to the Newport Beach home of affluent client Kathy to give her a massage before her dinner party. When Beatriz's car won't start after the massage, Kathy invites Beatriz to stay for the dinner party, to the chagrin of her husband Grant who thinks it's a bad idea because they are entertaining important business connections.

The first guests to arrive are married couple Shannon and Alex, who are about to make a small fortune off of a business venture. Next to arrive is Doug Strutt, the guest of honor and a real estate tycoon, with his wife Jeana. Kathy introduces Beatriz to her friends and explains how they met: Beatriz treated Tara, Kathy and Grant's daughter who is currently away at college. Kathy claims Beatriz's alternative therapies helped Tara beat cancer. When Beatriz learns that a friend won't be able to come help with her car until the morning, Kathy insists that she stay the night.

Interactions between Doug and Beatriz get off to a bad start with Doug mistaking her for one of the house staff members. Beatriz tells Doug he looks familiar to her, and he tells her that because of his various businesses, it is possible she saw him in the news. During dinner, Beatriz discusses how a hotel built in her home state of Guerrero promised jobs and opportunities for her community but ended up destroying it; her family lost their home, and the police killed protesters. Doug admits to having hotels in Mexico, but insists his hotel is not the same one Beatriz describes.

In the living room, tensions come to a head when Doug brags about his hunting of animals while on safari in South Africa and passes around his phone that has a photo of a dead rhinoceros he hunted. When Beatriz sees the photo, she calls the act "disgusting" and hurls the mobile at Doug. She exits the room as Doug laughs it off, saying not everyone can handle the graphic image.

Beatriz apologizes to Kathy and promises to make it up to her, with Kathy recommending she go to bed early. Beatriz goes to Tara's room, where she Googles Doug on the computer. The search results reveal that Doug's businesses have been involved in various controversies and legal problems. Beatriz then decides to rejoin the guests on the patio and brings a guitar with her. She sings a song titled "Las simples cosas," telling the guests it is about "how we always want to go back to the places where we loved life, but the old, simple things are now gone."

After the song, she and Doug again trade words, with Doug insisting on the idea of manifest destiny, and Beatriz arguing that instead of hunting and killing, he should try healing. When the argument escalates and Beatriz calls out the privilege of the guests, Grant angrily tells her she needs to leave immediately and he will call a tow truck for her. Kathy tries to give Beatriz money, but she rejects it.

Doug follows Beatriz outside the house and tells her she should lighten up and not take things so seriously. Beatriz reiterates her certainty that she knows him from somewhere. When the truck arrives, Beatriz gets in, but she leaves to retrieve something from the house. She goes to Grant's office and picks up a letter opener, then charges at Doug who is in the foyer talking on the phone. She stabs him in the throat, and the other guests run to him, horrified. However, the sequence is revealed to be a fantasy, as Beatriz simply drops the letter opener and gets back in the truck. As the truck drives alongside the ocean, Beatriz asks the driver to pull over. She gradually walks to the beach and submerges herself in the water. She reawakens in her boat on the mangrove swamp of the film's opening.

== Cast ==
- Salma Hayek as Beatriz Blanco
- Chloë Sevigny as Shannon
- Connie Britton as Kathy
- Jay Duplass as Alex
- John Lithgow as Doug Strutt
- Amy Landecker as Jeana
- David Warshofsky as Grant
- John Early as Evan

== Production ==
=== Development ===
Mike White was inspired to write the script after the 2015 killing of Cecil the Lion. Said White, "I'm an animal person. I'd heard about that story, and it just hit me in the gut. I had thought to myself: If I was at a dinner party with a guy like that, and he told me he was going to Africa and hunt a lion, what would I do? Would I flip out on him? Grab a butter knife and leap across the table?" The character of Beatriz was written specifically for Salma Hayek, who was a fan of White's show Enlightened.

=== Casting ===
In August 2016, it was announced Connie Britton, John Lithgow, Chloë Sevigny, Jay Duplass, and Nina Arianda would be joining the film's cast, and that Miguel Arteta, a frequent collaborator of White's, would direct. It was also announced Christine Vachon would produce under her Killer Films banner, as would Aaron L. Gilbert under his Bron Studios banner. David Hinjosa and Pamela Koffler also served as producers on the film, alongside Jason Cloth, Richard McConnell, Brad Feinstein, and Lewis Hendler, who served as executive producers. It was later revealed Amy Landecker had joined the cast of the film, replacing Arianda.

=== Filming ===
Principal photography began on August 15, 2016, in Los Angeles, California. Production concluded on September 3, 2016. Mark Mothersbaugh composed the film's score.

== Release ==
The film had its world premiere at the Sundance Film Festival on January 23, 2017. Shortly after, Roadside Attractions, FilmNation Entertainment and Elevation Pictures acquired U.S. and Canadian distribution rights to the film, respectively. It was given a limited release on June 9, 2017, in the US, with a wider expansion beginning June 23. In Canada, the film was released on June 16, 2017.

The movie was released in Mexico and international territories by Walt Disney Studios Motion Pictures through their Buena Vista International distribution label.

== Reception ==
=== Box office ===
Beatriz at Dinner grossed $7,115,854 in the United States and Canada, and $309,537 in other territories, for a worldwide total of $7,425,391.

=== Critical response ===
On the review aggregator website Rotten Tomatoes, 75% of 134 critics' reviews are positive, with an average rating of 6.5/10. The website's consensus reads: "Beatriz at Dinner offers timely social commentary enlivened by powerful, layered performances from Salma Hayek and John Lithgow." Metacritic, which uses a weighted average, assigned the film a score of 68 out of 100, based on 36 critics, indicating "generally favorable" reviews.

A. O. Scott of The New York Times stated, "Beatriz at Dinner is about unresolvable contradictions, after all, which may mean that its failures are less specific than systemic." Scott lauded the performances of Hayek and Lithgow, writing that "the seriousness of its themes in no way detracts from the delight in watching Ms. Hayek and Mr. Lithgow perform their eccentric, intricate dance." Ann Hornaday of The Washington Post gave the film 2 out of 4 stars and described it as "a delicate, mournful, mystical little movie about the porous membrane that defines all our bubbles, and how tenuous its surface tension can be when severely tested."

Owen Gleiberman of Variety gave the film a positive review, calling the film a "small-scale but elegantly deft squirmfest that features a luminous performance by Salma Hayek." Hazem Fahmy of Film Inquiry praised Arteta and White for taking risks with the characterization of Beatriz and crafting a "vital metaphor for the bitter irony that is, for many, immigration to America". Critics praised the film's verbal repartee between Hayek and Lithgow's characters. Justin Chang of the Los Angeles Times said, "There's a mischievous vibe here that recalls the great bourgeois skewering satires of Luis Buñuel, particularly the way the story keeps building and releasing tension until a violent end seems inevitable. And Lithgow's performance is too nuanced, too intricately filigreed for Doug to be mistaken for a Trump stand-in. But 'Beatriz At Dinner' finally rests on the shoulders of its title character." Emily Yoshida of Vulture wrote, "Beatriz at Dinner may not stick the landing, but its central clash between healers and destroyers maintains its choke hold long after the credits have rolled."

Eric Kohn of IndieWire also gave the film a positive review, writing "White's script is well crafted as a grim chamber piece"; however, he noted "it falls short of developing its central tension beyond its initial implications." Loren King of Newport This Week commended the film for giving "an unflinching look at the subtleties inside [the] bubble of white privilege", but lamented the film "offers no satisfying resolution for the chasm between those who consume and those who serve, or between the small and the self-important." Leslie Felperin of The Hollywood Reporter gave the film a negative review, saying the film is a "flawed work, too broad and scattershot to skewer its deserving targets with the precision necessary for the task."

=== Political commentary ===
The script was written in the summer of 2015 when Donald Trump was still considering running for the United States presidency. At the time, White thought the possibility of Trump being elected to office was unlikely, and so did not necessarily envision the film as a strong allegory to Trump. After Trump was elected president in November 2016, the film took on a new significance as a critique of Trump's rhetoric and policies about immigration and Mexican immigrants, in particular. After the film premiered at Sundance in January 2017, it became seen as “the first great film of the Trump era." Multiple critics pointed to the character of Doug as a counterpart to Trump, as both are real estate magnates and display hostility towards immigrants from Mexico. The filmmakers acknowledged the similarities but maintained the character is not a direct reference to Trump.

=== Accolades ===
Award	Date of ceremony	Category	Recipient(s) and nominee(s)	Result	Ref.
National Board of Review	November 28, 2017	Top Ten Independent Film		Won	
Independent Spirit Awards	March 3, 2018	Best Female Lead	Salma Hayek	Nominated	
Independent Spirit Awards	March 3, 2018	Best Screenplay	Mike White	Nominated	
