= Amanda Warren =

American actress (born 1982)

- Born: July 17, 1982 (age 44); New York City, U.S.
- Occupation: Actress
- Years active: 2006–present

Amanda Warren (born July 17, 1982) is an American actress. She is known for her role as Lucy Warburton on the HBO drama series The Leftovers, as Betty on the Apple TV+ comedy series Dickinson, and for her role as FBI agent Catherine Weaver on the Netflix spy thriller series The Night Agent.

== Early life ==
Amanda Warren was born on July 17, 1982, in New York City. She studied singing at Professional Performing Arts School in New York.

== Career ==
In the late 2000s, Warren began appearing in small roles in several American television series and films. In 2010, she appeared in several guest-starring television roles, including Rubicon, Gossip Girl, The Good Wife, and Law & Order.

In 2014, Warren portrayed Lucy Warburton on HBO's drama television series The Leftovers. Her film credits include The Adjustment Bureau (2011), Seven Psychopaths (2012), All Is Bright (2013), Deep Powder (2013), Three Billboards Outside Ebbing, Missouri (2017), and Mother! (2017).

Warren signed on for a CBS political drama pilot titled Ways & Means in February 2020. The pilot, written by Mike Murphy and Ed Redlich, depicts a powerful congressional leader who has lost faith in politics, with Warren as the former community organizer and progressive activist Jerlene Brooks. In May 2021, CBS passed on the pilot.

In 2021, Warren was cast as Camille De Haan, mother of titular character Monet De Haan, in the 2021 reboot of Gossip Girl. She also starred in CBS' NCIS: New Orleans as Mayor Zahra Taylor.

In 2022, Warren was cast as the lead in the CBS cop drama East New York. She plays Regina Haywood: the newly promoted deputy inspector of the East New York neighborhood in East Brooklyn. The show was picked up for series and set for a fall debut during the 2022-23 United States network television schedule. Despite fan support it was cancelled after one season in May 2023 to give S.W.A.T a thirteen episode final season; as CBS demanded immediate streaming rights from production company WB Studios.

== Filmography ==
=== Film ===
Year	Title	Role	Notes
2011	The Adjustment Bureau	Senior Campaign Aide	
2012	Seven Psychopaths	Maggie	
2013	All Is Bright	Young Woman	
2013	Deep Powder	Officer O'Connor	
2017	Three Billboards Outside Ebbing, Missouri	Denise	
2017	Mother!	Healer	
2017	Roman J. Israel, Esq.	Lynn Jackson	
2017	The Super	Christina	
2023	The Burial	Gloria Gary	

=== Television ===
Year	Title	Role	Notes
2008–09	Law & Order: Criminal Intent	CSU Tech/Haydon	3 episodes
2010	The Good Wife	Ms. Pollock	Episode: "Fixed"
2010	Law & Order	Jalisa Kroger	Episode: "Steel-Eyed Death"
2010	Rubicon	Erin- Polygraph Tech	Episode: "The Truth Will Out"
2010	Gossip Girl	Ostroff Therapist	Episode: "The Townie"
2011	A Mann's World	Michelle	TV movie
2011	Detroit 1-8-7	Rachel Cook-Jones	Episode: "Ice Man/Malibu"
2012	The Closer	DDA Claire Baldwin	2 episodes
2013	Royal Pains	Sandra	Episode: "Can of Worms"
2014	The Leftovers	Lucy Warburton	Main role (season 1)
2015	Law & Order: Special Victims Unit	Tracy	Episode: "Undercover Mother"
2015	Jessica Jones	Dr. Gallo	Episode: "AKA Smile"
2016	Recon	Malik	TV movie
2017	Las Reinas	Inspector Elsa Geller	Episode: "Pilot"
2017	This Is Us	Dorthy Hill	Episode: "Memphis"
2017	Taken	Marie Salt	2 episodes
2017	The Wizard of Lies	SEC Investigator	TV movie
2017	House of Cards	Jenna Perkins	Episode: "Chapter 54"
2017	The Brave	Louise Webb	Episode: "Enhanced Protection"
2017–2020	NCIS: New Orleans	Mayor Zahra Taylor	Recurring role, 5 episodes
2017	Black Mirror	Angelica	Episode: "Black Museum"
2018	Power	Jessica Travers	Episodes: "Damage Control", "Are We on the Same Team?"
2018	Law & Order: Special Victims Unit	Regina Carter	Episodes: "Guardian", "Hell's Kitchen"
2018	The Purge	Jane Barbour	Main role (season 1)
2019	Blindspot	Iris	Episode: "Careless Whisper"
2019–2021	Dickinson	Betty	Recurring role (season 1); Guest starring (season 2); Main role (season 3)
2019	FBI	Sloan Wallace, Profiler	Episode: "Ties That Bind"
2019	Madam Secretary	Olivia Mason	6 episodes
2021	Genius: Aretha	Melba Parks	Episode: "Respect"
2021–2023	Gossip Girl	Camille de Haan	Recurring role
2022–2023	East New York	Regina Haywood	Main role
2024–2025	Law & Order	Defense Attorney Camilla Paymor	2 episodes
2025-2026	The Night Agent	Catherine Weaver	Main role (seasons 2–3)
TBA	Myron Bolitar	Deanna Richmond	Recurring role, upcoming series
