= Motherhood (2009 film) =

- Theatrical release poster
- Directed by: Katherine Dieckmann
- Written by: Katherine Dieckmann
- Produced by: Jana Edelbaum; Rachel Cohen; Pamela Koffler; Christine Vachon
- Starring: Uma Thurman; Anthony Edwards; Minnie Driver
- Cinematography: Nancy Schreiber
- Edited by: Michael R. Miller
- Music by: Joe Henry
- Production companies: iDeal Partners; Killer Films; 120db Films
- Distributed by: Freestyle Releasing
- Release dates: January 21, 2009 (Sundance); October 23, 2009 (United States; limited)
- Running time: 90 minutes
- Country: United States
- Language: English
- Budget: $10 million
- Box office: $726,354

Motherhood is a 2009 American comedy-drama film written and directed by Katherine Dieckmann and starring Uma Thurman.

== Plot ==
Eliza Welch (Uma Thurman), former fiction writer now wife, mother and blogger. has a single day that just about pushes her tipping point.

After putting her deeper creative ambitions on hold to raise her two children, Eliza lives and works in a walk-up tenement in the middle of Greenwich Village. Her good-natured but absent-minded husband (Anthony Edwards) seems tuned out to his wife's conflicts, not to mention basic domestic reality, while her best friend Sheila (Minnie Driver) understands this - and Eliza - too well.

With her daunting to-do list kicking off at dawn, Eliza has to prepare for her daughter's 6th birthday party, mind her toddler son, battle for parking space during an epic alternate side parking showdown, navigate playground politics with overbearing moms, and mend a rift after posting her best friends intimate confession on her blog. On top of it all, Eliza decides to enter a contest run by an upscale parenting magazine. All she has to do is write 500 words answering the deceptively simple question, "What Does Motherhood Mean to Me".

== Cast ==
- Uma Thurman as Eliza Welsh, the married mother of two
- Minnie Driver as Sheila, her best friend
- Anthony Edwards as Avery, her husband
- Clea Lewis as Lily
- Jake M. Smith as Snotty Production Assistant
- Betsy Aidem as Jordan's Mom
- Dale Soules as Hester
- Jodie Foster as herself

== Production ==
Motherhood and Arlen Faber (later renamed The Answer Man) were a pair of films independently financed and produced by the New York City-based iDeal Partners Film Fund.

The two films were part of a coordinated effort by iDeal Partners to reduce the risk in investing in film production during the late-2000s recession; they were pre-sold to foreign distributors, cast with "commercially-tested actors" and took advantage of U.S. state tax incentives that encouraged film production. Both also premiered at the 2009 Sundance Film Festival. As of January 2009, Jana Edelbaum, co-founder of iDeal Partners, was predicting "at least a 15 percent return for her investors and – if something big happens with Motherhood or Arlen Faber – as much as 40 percent."

== Inspiration ==
Men can write great women's movies, but I don't think a man could write this movie. I don't think any man can understand what it's like to face the day to day the way a woman can, what it means for a woman to be compromised by domesticity.

— Dieckmann, on her film Motherhood.

The writer/director's "real life was the inspiration for the film"; Dieckmann's home consists of two rent-stabilized apartments on the same floor of a West Village building, with one apartment for the bedrooms, and the other containing a kitchen, office and living room. In the film; Thurman's character "lives in [literally the] same building, in a bisected apartment." Filming took place in New York City starting in May 2008 and lasting about 25 days.

== Release ==
Motherhood received a limited release in the United States on October 23, 2009, by Freestyle Releasing.

In March 2010, the film's British premiere was confined to a single London cinema: the Apollo Piccadilly Circus. The box office gross was £9 on its opening night and £88 on its opening weekend; eleven viewers purchased a ticket, with only one person attending its first showing. Veteran film critic Barry Norman said, "It's a reasonable assumption that there was a marketing and advertising catastrophe, and people didn't know it was showing."

== Reception ==
The film received generally negative reviews. On review aggregator Rotten Tomatoes, the film holds an approval rating of 20% based on 51 reviews, with an average rating of 3.88/10. The website's critics consensus reads: "Despite Uma Thurman's comic skills, Motherhood's contrived set-ups and clichéd jokes keep this comedy from delivering laughs – or insights into modern parenting." Metacritic, which uses a weighted average, assigned the film a score of 34 out of 100, based on 15 critics, indicating "generally unfavorable" reviews.

In October 2009, Roger Ebert gave the film two stars out of four, saying the film is "billed as a comedy, but at no point will you require oxygen. There are some smiles and chuckles and a couple of actual laughs, but the overall effect is underwhelming"; Thurman is "doing her best with a role that may offer her less than any other in her career, even though she's constantly onscreen." A. O. Scott said Thurman's character is "scattered, ambivalent, flaky and inconsistent – all of which is fine, and energetically conveyed by Ms. Thurman. But what are tolerable quirks in a person can be deadly to a narrative, and Ms. Dieckmann, trying for observational nuance, descends into trivia and wishful thinking. ... The humor is soft, the dramas are small, and the movie stumbles from loose and scruffy naturalism to sitcom tidiness."

The Times observed that while Motherhood was only the second-worst flop in British cinematic history, the film that beat it to that honor, 2007's My Nikifor, which "took £7 on its launch ... was a small independent effort rather than a £3m Hollywood production [like Motherhood]."

Thurman won two awards at the Boston Film Festival, one for Best Actress for her work in Motherhood and an out-of-competition Film Excellence Award for her career accomplishments.
