= Dina (film) =

American documentary film

- Film poster
- Directed by: Dan Sickles; Antonio Santini
- Produced by: Dan Sickles; Antonio Santini
- Starring: Dina Buno; Scott Levin
- Cinematography: Adam Uhl
- Edited by: Sofia Subercaseaux
- Production companies: Killer Films; El Peligro; Cinereach; Moxie Pictures; Impact Partners
- Distributed by: The Orchard
- Release date: January 29, 2017 (Sundance)
- Running time: 101 minutes
- Country: United States
- Language: English

Dina is a 2017 American documentary film about Dina Buno and her partner Scott Levin, both on the autism spectrum.

== Production ==
Dina was directed by Antonio Santini and Dan Sickles. It was edited by Sofia Subercaseaux and is 101 minutes long.

== Release ==
Dina premiered in 2017 at the Sundance Film Festival.

== Awards ==
Dina won the Sundance Film Festival’s U.S. Documentary Grand Jury Prize in 2017. It also received the 2017 Karen Schmeer Award for Excellence in Documentary Editing from the Independent Film Festival Boston, the IDA Award for best feature documentary of the year in 2017, and a special jury prize for honesty and humanity from the 2017 Sarasota Film Festival. Also in 2017 Dan Sickles received the Producer’s Vision Award from the Sun Valley Film Festival for producing the film. Dina Buno and Scott Levin were listed among the 2017 Cinema Eye Honors Unforgettables. The film also received the Utah Film Center’s Peek Award in 2018.

== Nominations ==
Dina was nominated for the Grand Jury award at Sheffield Doc/Fest. The song "Best I Can" from the film, written and performed by Michael Cera and featuring Sharon Van Etten, was nominated for Best Song in a Documentary at the 2017 Critics' Choice Documentary Awards.
