= The Last of Robin Hood =

2013 film by Wash West

- Teaser poster
- Directed by: Richard Glatzer; Wash Westmoreland
- Written by: Richard Glatzer; Wash Westmoreland
- Produced by: Christine Vachon; Declan Baldwin; Pamela Koffler
- Starring: Kevin Kline; Susan Sarandon; Dakota Fanning
- Cinematography: Michael Simmonds
- Edited by: Robin Katz
- Music by: Nick Urata
- Production companies: Big Indie Pictures; Killer Films
- Distributed by: Samuel Goldwyn Films
- Release date: September 6, 2013 (TIFF)
- Running time: 88 minutes
- Country: United States
- Language: English
- Box office: $288,545

The Last of Robin Hood is a 2013 American independent biographical drama film about actor Errol Flynn written and directed by Richard Glatzer and Wash Westmoreland. The film stars Kevin Kline, Dakota Fanning, Susan Sarandon, Matthew Kane, and Max Casella. It was screened in the Special Presentation section at the 2013 Toronto International Film Festival.

== Cast ==
- Kevin Kline as Errol Flynn
- Dakota Fanning as Beverly Aadland
- Susan Sarandon as Florence Aadland
- Patrick St. Esprit as Herb Aadland
- Matthew Kane as Ronnie Shedlo
- Max Casella as Stanley Kubrick
- Sean Flynn as Grip (Sean Flynn is the real-life grandson of Errol Flynn)
- Bryan Batt as Orry-Kelly
- Jane McNeill as Cynthia Gould
- Ric Reitz as Melvin Belli
- Jackie Prucha as Hedda Hopper
- Peter Belsito as Barry Mahon
- Joe Knezevich as John Ireland
- Ben Winchell as Jack

== Production ==
Killer Films set Richard Glatzer and Wash West to write and direct a biographical film about Errol Flynn. By April 9, 2014, Samuel Goldwyn Films had acquired the US distribution rights to the film.

=== Casting ===
On October 10, 2012, it was in the news that Kevin Kline and Susan Sarandon had signed on to star in the film. Kline would play the role of Errol Flynn, a legendary actor who was in a relationship with a 17-year-old girl, Beverly Aadland, and Sarandon would play Florence Aadland, Beverly Aadland's stage mother. On January 23, 2013, Dakota Fanning was added to the cast to play the role of Beverly Aadland, Flynn's teenage girlfriend. Patrick St. Esprit also joined the cast to play Herb Aadland, Beverly Aadland's father.

=== Filming ===
The filming of The Last of Robin Hood began in the end of January 2013 in Atlanta, Georgia.

== Reception ==
On review aggregator website Rotten Tomatoes, it has a score of 28% based on 66 reviews. The website's critical consensus reads "Kevin Kline's performance is spot on, but in every other respect, The Last of Robin Hood disappoints." Dakota Fanning's performance was panned by several critics.

=== Marketing ===
On June 24, 2014, the first trailer of the film was released.
