= Deep Powder =

- Film poster
- Directed by: Mo Ogordnik
- Written by: Mo Ogordnik; Matt Bardin
- Produced by: Gwen Bialic; Ben Howe; Pamela Koffler; Christine Vachon
- Starring: Shiloh Fernandez; Haley Bennett
- Cinematography: Michael Simmonds
- Edited by: Agnes Grandits; Joe Klotz
- Music by: Peter Nashel
- Production company: Killer Films
- Distributed by: Vuguru
- Release date: April 19, 2013 (Tribeca)
- Running time: 91 minutes
- Country: United States
- Language: English

Deep Powder is a 2013 American thriller drama film starring Shiloh Fernandez and Haley Bennett.

== Cast ==
- Shiloh Fernandez as Danny
- Haley Bennett as Natasha
- John Magaro as Cota
- Logan Miller as Crash
- Dana Eskelson as Michelle
- Crystal Lonneberg as Prison Visitor
- Amanda Warren as Officer O'Connor
- Josh Salatin as Kaz
- Colby Minifie as Snack
