= Mala Mala (film) =

2014 film directed by Antonio Santini and Dan Sickles

- Theatrical release poster
- Directed by: Antonio Santini; Dan Sickles
- Written by: Antonio Santini; Dan Sickles
- Produced by: Antonio Santini; Dan Sickles
- Cinematography: Adam Uhl
- Edited by: Sofía Subercaseaux
- Music by: Flavien Berger
- Production companies: El Peligro; Killer Films; Moxie Pictures
- Distributed by: Strand Releasing
- Release date: April 19, 2014 (Tribeca Film Festival)
- Running time: 90 minutes
- Country: Puerto Rico
- Languages: Spanish and English
- Box office: $10,761

Mala Mala is a 2014 Puerto Rican documentary film directed by Antonio Santini and Dan Sickles, starring Jason "April" Carrión, Samantha Close and Ivana Fred. The film shows several stories of the transgender community in Puerto Rico, including April Carrion, a well-known drag queen who participated in the reality show RuPaul's Drag Race. Mala Mala also includes the historic victory of the LGBT community with the approval and signature of Law 238-2014 (in Puerto Rico), which prevents discrimination in employment based on sexual orientation and/or gender identity. Mala Mala has been presented in festivals around the world, including London, Ukraine, Los Angeles, Austin, Costa Rica and Mexico, in addition to schools such as The Boston Conservatory at Berklee, University of Pennsylvania, New York University and Harvard University.

== Cast ==
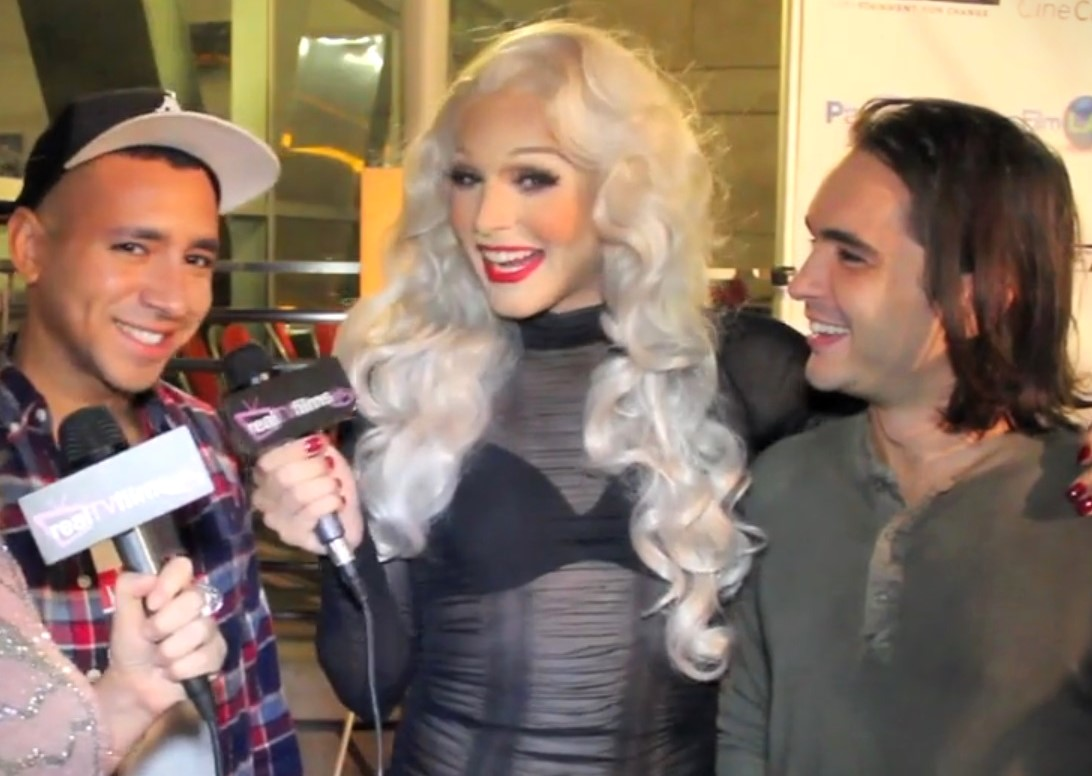
(left to right) Antonio Santini, April Carrion, Dan Sickles discuss the film at the 2014 Hollywood Film Festival

- Jason Carrión as himself / as April Carrión
- Samantha Close as herself
- Ivana Fred as herself
- Carlos Pascual as himself / as Queen Bee Ho
- Paxx Moll as Themself
- Alberic Prados as himself / as Zahara Montiere
- Denise "Sandy" Rivera as herself
- Soraya Santiago Solla as herself
- Sophia Voines as herself

== Critical reception ==
Critical reception for Mala Mala has been very positive. Writing for Out, Max McCormack describes that:

Santini's and Sickles's style is as much a piece of modern investigation as it is a nod to films that came before. There are references to Paris is Burning, Pedro Almodóvar features, Valley of the Dolls, and even 90s Nickelodeon stylistic choices. The two men hope to make an impact in driving this notoriously ignored issue forward.

In The Huffington Post, Priscilla Frank said that the film:

shows a life in which the line between performance and reality fades away, where fantasy and fact contribute to one's reality. Mala Mala provides a thought-provoking look at where gender identity and cultural identity intersect, while showing that life still revolves around the search for selfhood and the love between friends.

Frank Scheck from The Hollywood Reporter reviewed the film after their showcase at the Tribeca Film Festival:

The film examines the myriad personal issues of its interviewees who emerge as articulate spokespeople for their largely marginalized subculture. Sure to be a staple at gay-themed film festivals, the film should garner significant attention upon its commercial release. Its subjects are indeed a fascinating and diverse lot. Interspersed with the insightful interviews are glossily photographed scenes of the subjects clearly relishing playing to the camera, from Alberic sexily splashing about in his bathtub to Samantha bathing nude in a river to Sophia lip-synching a Barbra Streisand song using a dildo for a microphone.

Diana Clarke wrote for The Village Voice,

In the Puerto Rican queer and drag communities, "mala" is used to mean something closer to "fierce." How rare and necessary to find a beautifully shot, kind and immersive movie that centers the stories and lives of brown transgender folks. This film does not pander. Rather, it demands that the viewer rise to the occasion.

In December 2015 The Advocate published its list of "The 10 Best LGBT Documentaries of 2015" where Mala Mala figured as a favorite.

== Awards and nominations ==
| Year | Association | Category | Nominee(s) | Result |
|---|---|---|---|---|
| 2016 | 27th GLAAD Media Awards | Outstanding Documentary | Antonio Santini, Dan Sickles | Nominated |
| 2016 | Cinema Tropical Awards | Best US Latino Film | Antonio Santini, Dan Sickles | Won |
| 2015 | Social Impact Media Awards | Best Editing Documentary Feature | Sofía Subercaseaux, El Peligro | Won |
| 2015 | Social Impact Media Awards | Best Cinematography Documentary Feature | Adam Uhl, El Peligro | Won |
| 2015 | Philadelphia International Gay & Lesbian Film Festival | Best Documentary | Dan Sickles, Antonio Santini, El Peligro | Won |
| 2015 | Philadelphia International Gay & Lesbian Film Festival | Best Director Documentary | Dan Sickles, Antonio Santini, El Peligro | Won |
| 2015 | Philadelphia International Gay & Lesbian Film Festival | First Time Director Documentary | Dan Sickles, Antonio Santini, El Peligro | Won |
| 2015 | CaribbeanTales International Film Festival | Best Documentary Feature | Dan Sickles, Antonio Santini, El Peligro | Won |
| 2014 | Tribeca Film Festival | Audience Award | Dan Sickles, Antonio Santini | 2nd place |
| 2014 | Tribeca Film Festival | Best Documentary Feature | Dan Sickles, Antonio Santini | Nominated |
| 2014 | Puerto Rico Queer FilmFest | Best Documentary | Dan Sickles, Antonio Santini, El Peligro | Won |
| 2014 | Molodist International Film Festival | International Documentary (Sunny Rabbit Prize) | Dan Sickles, Antonio Santini, El Peligro | Won |
| 2014 | Costa Rica International Film Festival | Best Editing Documentary | Sofía Subercaseaux, Dan Sickles, El Peligro | Won |
| 2014 | Austin Gay & Lesbian International Film Festival | Best Documentary | Dan Sickles, Antonio Santini, El Peligro | Won |

== See also ==
- List of lesbian, gay, bisexual or transgender-related films of 2014
- List of Puerto Rican films
