= The World to Come =

2020 American historical drama film by Mona Fastvold

- Release poster
- Directed by: Mona Fastvold
- Screenplay by: Ron Hansen; Jim Shepard
- Based on: "The World to Come" by Jim Shepard
- Produced by: Pamela Koffler; David Hinojosa; Casey Affleck; Whitaker Lader; Margarethe Baillou
- Starring: Katherine Waterston; Vanessa Kirby; Christopher Abbott; Casey Affleck
- Cinematography: Andre Chemetoff
- Edited by: Dávid Jancsó
- Music by: Daniel Blumberg
- Production companies: Killer Films; Sea Change Media; M.Y.R.A. Entertainment; Yellow Bear Films; Hype Film; Ingenious Media
- Distributed by: Bleecker Street
- Release dates: September 6, 2020 (Venice); February 12, 2021 (United States)
- Running time: 98 minutes
- Country: United States
- Language: English
- Box office: $205,878

The World to Come is a 2020 American historical drama film directed by Mona Fastvold from a screenplay by Ron Hansen and Jim Shepard, based on Shepard's 2017 short story of the same name. It stars Katherine Waterston, Vanessa Kirby, Christopher Abbott, and Casey Affleck, and follows two neighboring couples battling hardship and isolation in mid-19th-century United States.

The film had its world premiere at the 77th Venice International Film Festival on September 6, 2020, where it won the Queer Lion award for best LGBTQ-themed film at the festival. The film was released in the United States by Bleecker Street in select theaters on February 12, 2021, and on premium video on demand on March 2.

== Plot ==
In 1856, in Schoharie County, New York, Abigail and Dyer live an isolated life in the country working as farmers. They are both devastated by the loss of their young daughter Nellie several months earlier. Natural introverts, they rarely speak of their feelings to each other. However, one night Dyer tells her of the terror he felt as a child during an earthquake. His openness about his feelings moves her to want to make love with him for this first time since Nellie's death.

Tallie and Finney arrive in the area, both of whom are vivacious, in contrast to Abigail and Dyer. Tallie's warmth and openness make a strong impression on Abigail, and the two women form a fast friendship. Abigail confides to Tallie that her marriage with Dyer is based on practicality, not romance, while Tallie reveals that her husband Finney can be quarrelsome and controlling.

For Abigail's birthday, Tallie buys her an atlas that she had longed for. When Tallie is returning home from the birthday visit, she is caught in a storm that nearly kills her. Her husband takes her away to recuperate. In the spring Tallie resumes her visits to Abigail.

Eventually, Abigail confesses to Tallie how powerfully she feels for the openness of their relationship, a confession that leads to a physical affair (the full extent of which is revealed later in the film via flashback). Dyer seems aware that something is happening between them, but he does not interfere. Finney, however, becomes jealous of the time Tallie spends away from him. Abigail expresses concern about Finney telling Tallie of many husbands poisoning their wives in the county.

Finney eventually asks Abigail and Dyer to dinner. Abigail notices bruises on Tallie's neck. Finney tells a morbid story about holding his disobedient dog outside until it froze to death. Afterwards, Tallie doesn't visit for a week. Abigail finally goes in search of her and finds her rented house empty with only a bloody kerchief left behind. Though she suspects foul play, she eventually receives a letter from Tallie informing her she has moved 85 miles away to the Skaneateles area of Onondaga County, where her life is miserable.

Abigail insists on going to see Tallie, and Dyer accompanies her. However, by the time they arrive, Tallie is dead. Finney claims it is from diphtheria.

Abigail returns to her mundane life on the farm with Dyer. When Dyer reveals that he has always feared he would be unable to be of worth to the people in his life, Abigail is moved enough to imagine he is Tallie, indicating a new world of possibilities if she and Dyer can contrive the same sort of openness that existed between she and Tallie.

== Cast ==
- Katherine Waterston as Abigail
- Vanessa Kirby as Tallie
- Christopher Abbott as Finney
- Casey Affleck as Dyer
- Karina Ziana Gherasim as Nellie

== Production ==
It was announced in February 2019 that Casey Affleck would produce and star in the film, with Mona Fastvold directing. Katherine Waterston, Vanessa Kirby and Jesse Plemons were also cast in the film, although Plemons dropped out and was later replaced with Christopher Abbott.

Principal photography in Romania began in September 2019.

== Music ==
British composer Daniel Blumberg was commissioned to compose music for the film. He collaborated with avant-garde musicians including Peter Brötzmann, Josephine Foster and Steve Noble on the score, and enlisted Scott Walker producer Peter Walsh to co-produce.

== Release ==
The World to Come had its world premiere in competition at the 77th Venice International Film Festival on September 6, 2020. Shortly afterward, Bleecker Street acquired US distribution rights to the film, with Sony Pictures Worldwide Acquisitions distributing it outside the United States. It was released in the US in select theaters on February 12, 2021, and on premium video on demand on March 2. On March 6, 2022, it began showing on Sky Cinema Premiere in the United Kingdom.

== Reception ==
=== Critical reception ===
The World to Come holds a 74% approval rating on review aggregator Rotten Tomatoes, based on 149 reviews, with an average of 6.7/10. The website's critics consensus reads: "The World to Come is made from ingredients that will be familiar to fans of period forbidden romance movies, but they're given fresh life thanks to an excellent cast." On Metacritic, the film holds a rating of 73 out of 100, based on 30 critics, indicating "generally positive" reviews.

Xan Brooks of The Guardian called it "a ravishingly beautiful love story set in 1850s America, with painterly visuals that nod to the work of Winslow Homer and John Singer Sargent"; he opined that Waterson delivered "a moving central performance as Abigail". Tomris Laffly of RogerEbert.com wrote "You long for something evocative and warm throughout The World to Come, only to leave it with a minor shiver." Guy Lodge of Variety wrote "Fastvold doesn’t resist the obviousness of her film’s seasonal metaphors, but doesn’t overwork them other: This is filmmaking as attuned to incremental shifts in light and landscape (Romania’s, in fact, gorgeously filling in for undeveloped upstate New York) as the ebb and flow of a character’s interior joy, written in a face unaccustomed to smiling." Jonathan Romney of Screen International wrote "It would be easy to sell The World to Come as ‘the female Brokeback Mountain’, but that would be to traduce the richness, singularity and command of Mona Fastvold’s beautifully executed and acted drama."

Richard Lawson of Vanity Fair wrote "The film offers a small bit of emotional rescue at its very end—a graceful tribute to the escapes of memory and fantasy—but by then the dourness of its conclusions has blotted out any rounder sense of meaning. There is not much world to come, after all." Ben Kenigsberg of The New York Times wrote "Waterston and Kirby are both superb at creating characters whose attraction must be shown to grow by degrees, without overt admission. Affleck and Abbott, too, navigate a tricky dynamic, playing men who perhaps lack an understanding of their own compassion or brutishness. The use of film stock, natural light, narrow compositions and an offbeat, clarinet-heavy score by Daniel Blumberg all contribute to the sense of a story dusted off from the past." Kate Stables of Sight and Sound wrote "Director Mona Fastvold’s delicate, tragedy-tinged period lesbian romance, set in mid 19th-century rough-country New York State, is filled with these sensuous grace notes, as the childless women’s closeness through the harsh rural winter tips into a yearning affair." Leah Greenblatt of Entertainment Weekly wrote "the immersive look of the film, with its strikingly unadorned landscapes and dim-lit interiors, casts a spell".

Erica Abeel of The Arts Fuse wrote "It’s interesting that films about female desire directed by women tend to avoid the explicitness of like-themed stories by male directors. Consider the raw sexuality in Blue is the Warmest Color by Abdellatif Kechiche, a film trailed by accusations from the actresses of exploitation. World alludes to physical love only in a quick flashback leavened by a sense of loss. I came away from the film with a haunting sense of lives long gone that continue to resonate across a century. But, overall, the tale unscrolls at a remove that alienates viewers more than it reels them in." Elizabeth Weitzman of TheWrap wrote "it’s the authentically-felt pioneer environment that sets this movie apart, hardship and survival seeping into every inch of the frame." Mary Beth McAndrews of Film School Rejects wrote "the film’s ending holds The World To Come back from standing out as a unique queer period piece. Tragedies aside, this is a film that will sweep you away to a beautiful yet harsh time where happiness came and left as quickly as a summer rain."

In June 2025, IndieWire ranked the film at number 69 on its list of "The 100 Best Movies of the 2020s (So Far)".

=== Accolades ===
Awards	Date of ceremony	Category	Recipient(s) and nominee(s)	Result	Ref.
Ivor Novello Awards	May 19, 2022	Best Original Film Score	Daniel Blumberg	Won	
London Film Critics' Circle	February 7, 2021	Actress of the Year	Vanessa Kirby (shared with Pieces of a Woman)	Nominated	
San Sebastián International Film Festival	September 28, 2020	Golden Shell Award for Best Film	Mona Fastvold	Nominated	
Stockholm International Film Festival	November 22, 2020	Best Film	Mona Fastvold	Nominated	
Stockholm International Film Festival	November 22, 2020	Best Actress	Katherine Waterston	Won	
Venice Film Festival	September 12, 2020	Golden Lion	Mona Fastvold	Nominated	
Venice Film Festival	September 12, 2020	Queer Lion	Mona Fastvold	Won	
