= One Hour Photo =

2002 film by Mark Romanek

- Theatrical release poster
- Directed by: Mark Romanek
- Written by: Mark Romanek
- Produced by: Pamela Koffler; Christine Vachon; Stan Wlodkowski
- Starring: Robin Williams; Connie Nielsen; Michael Vartan; Gary Cole; Eriq La Salle
- Cinematography: Jeff Cronenweth
- Edited by: Jeffrey Ford
- Music by: Reinhold Heil; Johnny Klimek
- Production companies: Catch 23 Entertainment; Killer Films; John Wells Productions
- Distributed by: Fox Searchlight Pictures
- Release dates: January 13, 2002 (Sundance); August 21, 2002 (United States)
- Running time: 96 minutes
- Country: United States
- Language: English
- Budget: $12 million
- Box office: $52.2 million

One Hour Photo is a 2002 American psychological thriller film written and directed by Mark Romanek. It stars Robin Williams as a photo technician who develops an unhealthy obsession with a family to whom he has long provided services. Connie Nielsen, Michael Vartan, Gary Cole, and Eriq La Salle appear in supporting roles.

The film premiered at the 2002 Sundance Film Festival, followed by a limited release on August 21, 2002 by Fox Searchlight Pictures, and a wider release on September 13. It received positive reviews from film critics, with praise for Williams' against-type performance, and grossed over $52 million on a $12 million budget.

== Plot ==
Sy Parrish is a photo technician at a one-hour photo lab in big-box store SavMart. He resides alone with a pet hamster, has no friends or love life, and lives only for his work, which he considers a "vital service". Over many years of developing their photos, he has grown obsessed with the Yorkin family, enshrining them in his home with secret copies of their family photos.

Sy sparks a connection with Nina Yorkin by feigning interest in a book he saw her purchase. Nina becomes aware of Sy's solitary existence, something only her son Jake had known about. When store manager Bill Owens audits company expenditures, he discovers Sy has spent nine years producing many more prints than customers have paid for. Sy is devastated when Bill fires him.

Permitted to work to the end of the week, Sy discovers Will Yorkin's photos reveal he is having an affair. His idyllic conception of the Yorkins as the perfect family is shattered. He surreptitiously places the photos of Will and his mistress, Maya Burson, into Nina's order. He takes paparazzi-style photos of Bill's young daughter, and gives the film with the photos to Yoshi, another SavMart employee. Yoshi turns Sy's photos over to Bill, who reports the matter to the police. Detectives James Van Der Zee and Paul Outerbridge investigate Sy's obsession.

Sy confronts Will and Maya during a hotel rendezvous. Armed with a knife and a camera, Sy forces the lovers to pose naked in sexual positions. When police arrive, Sy escapes through an emergency exit, but Van Der Zee catches him. Outerbridge finds Will and Maya physically unharmed but emotionally traumatized. Sy is arrested in the parking garage, claiming "I just took pictures."

Sy breaks down under police interrogation and implies his parents took pornographic photos of him when he was a child. Sy asks to see the hotel photos and the detective obliges. The prints depict random hotel room furnishings; none show Will or Maya.

== Cast ==
- Robin Williams as Sy Parrish
- Michael Vartan as Will Yorkin
- Connie Nielsen as Nina Yorkin
- Gary Cole as Bill Owens, the store manager at SavMart
- Eriq La Salle as Det. James Van Der Zee
- Clark Gregg as Det. Paul Outerbridge
- Paul H. Kim as Yoshi Araki
- Erin Daniels as Maya Burson
- Dylan Smith as Jake Yorkin
- Marion Colvert as Mrs. Von Unwerth
- David Moreland as Mr. Siskind
- Jim Rash as Amateur Porn Guy
- Nick Searcy as Larry the repairman

== Production ==
Trent Reznor of the band Nine Inch Nails was originally asked to compose the film's score. However, early in the process, Romanek was allegedly pressured by the studio to hire a "real composer", and Reznor was dropped from the production. Some of the music that Reznor created for the film evolved into material found on the Nine Inch Nails EP Still.

Filming began in Los Angeles on October 30, 2000 and concluded in January 2001.

In one of the voice-over pieces, Sy can be heard saying, "They actually believe that any idiot that attends a two-day seminar can master the art of making beautiful prints in less than an hour. But of course, like most things, there's far more to it than meets the eye." Williams prepared for the role by training for two and a half days in a Southern California photo development lab.

In the DVD commentary, Romanek says that Jack Nicholson was first approached to play the lead character. Nicholson turned down the role reportedly because he thought that the character was too similar to the role he played in The Shining (1980).

== Reception ==
=== Critical response ===
On review aggregator website Rotten Tomatoes, One Hour Photo holds an approval rating of 82% based on 195 reviews, with an average rating of 7/10. The site's critics consensus reads: "Robin Williams is very effective in this creepy, well-shot thriller." At Metacritic, the film has a weighted average score of 64 out of 100, based on 35 critics, indicating "generally favorable reviews". Audiences polled by CinemaScore gave the film an average grade of "C" on a scale of A+ to F.

Roger Ebert of the Chicago Sun-Times gave the film three and a half stars out of four, and wrote, "Robin Williams plays Sy, another of his open-faced, smiling madmen, like the killer in Insomnia. He does this so well you don't have the slightest difficulty accepting him in the role."

Mick LaSalle of the San Francisco Chronicle noted that the film is "not nearly as intelligent, thoughtful or penetrating as it promises to be. Yet the consistent delicacy and emotional clarity of Williams' acting in One Hour Photo makes the picture impossible to dismiss."

In 2013 GamesRadar+ named the lead character one of the "50 Creepiest Movie Psychopaths".

=== Box office ===
The film's limited release began on August 21, 2002, in seven theaters, opening to a $321,515 weekend, with an average of $45,930 per theater. Its wide release began on September 13, with a 1,212-theater count. Still, the film made just over $8 million that weekend, and went on to gross $31,597,131 in the US, with an additional $20,626,175 in overseas territories, for an international total of $52,223,306.

=== Accolades ===
Award	Category	Recipients	Result
Critics' Choice Movie Awards	Best Actor	Robin Williams	Nominated
Dallas–Fort Worth Film Critics Association	Best Actor	Robin Williams	Nominated
Online Film Critics Society	Best Actor	Robin Williams	Nominated
Online Film Critics Society	Best Breakthrough Filmmaker	Mark Romanek	Won
Satellite Awards	Best Actor – Motion Picture	Robin Williams	Nominated
Satellite Awards	Best Editing	Jeffrey Ford	Nominated
Saturn Awards	Best Action/Adventure/Thriller Film		Nominated
Saturn Awards	Best Writing	Mark Romanek	Nominated
Saturn Awards	Best Actor	Robin Williams	Won
Saturn Awards	Best Supporting Actress	Connie Nielsen	Nominated
Saturn Awards	Best Music	Reinhold Heil	Nominated

== See also ==
- List of films featuring surveillance
