= Dan Sickles (director) =

American documentary film director

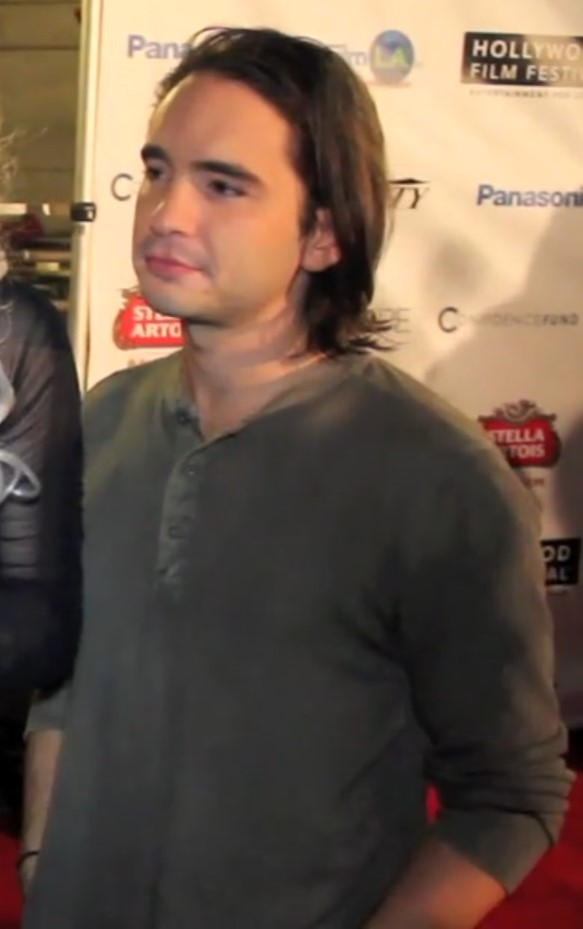
- Sickles at the 2014 Hollywood Film Festival
- Born: Fort Washington, Pennsylvania, U.S.
- Occupations: Director; writer; actor; producer
- Years active: 2011 – present

Dan Sickles is an American documentary film director, writer, actor and producer. He is best known for his documentaries, Mala Mala and Dina. In 2015, he was named in Out magazine's OUT100.

== Life and career ==
Sickles was born in Fort Washington, Pennsylvania. He earned his BFA from New York University's Tisch School of the Arts in 2010.

Sickles directed, wrote and produced his debut documentary, Mala Mala, along with Antonio Santini, about nine transgender individuals in Puerto Rico, which premiered at the Tribeca Film Festival and won the runner-up audience award at the 2014 Tribeca Film Festival. In 2015, he directed a short film, I Ate the Cosmos for Breakfast, based on the Melissa Studdard poetry collection I Ate the Cosmos for Breakfast.

In 2017, Sickles directed and produced his second documentary, Dina, along with Antonio Santini, about a love story between a suburban woman and a Walmart door greeter, premiered at the Sundance Film Festival.

== Filmography ==
Year	Title	Director	Writer	Producer	Note
2014	Mala Mala	Yes	Yes	Yes	Documentary
2015	I Ate the Cosmos for Breakfast	Yes		Yes	Short film
2017	Dina	Yes		Yes	Documentary

=== As actor ===
- 2012 : Art Machine (Feature film)
- 2013 : High Maintenance (TV Series)

== Awards and nominations ==
Year	Result	Award	Category	Work	Ref.
2014	Nominated	Tribeca Film Festival	Best Documentary Feature	Mala Mala	
2014	Nominated	Tribeca Film Festival	Audience Award	Mala Mala	
2015	Won	Philadelphia QFest	First Time Director Documentary	Mala Mala	
2015	Won	Philadelphia QFest	Best Documentary	Mala Mala	
2015	Won	Philadelphia QFest	Best Director Documentary	Mala Mala	
2017	Won	Sundance Film Festival	Grand Jury Prize	Dina	
2017	Won	International Documentary Association	Best Feature Documentary	Dina	
2017	Nominated	Sheffield Doc/Fest	Grand Jury Award	Dina	
