= Office Killer =

1997 American film by Cindy Sherman

- Theatrical release poster
- Directed by: Cindy Sherman
- Written by: Todd Haynes
- Screenplay by: Tom Kalin; Elise MacAdam
- Story by: Elise MacAdam; Cindy Sherman
- Produced by: Christine Vachon; Pamela Koffler
- Starring: Carol Kane; David Thornton; Molly Ringwald; Jeanne Tripplehorn; Barbara Sukowa
- Cinematography: Russell Fine
- Edited by: Merril Ster
- Music by: Evan Lurie
- Production companies: Good Machine; Kardana/Swinsky Films; Good Fear
- Distributed by: Strand Releasing
- Release date: December 3, 1997
- Running time: 82 minutes
- Country: United States
- Language: English

Office Killer is a 1997 American comedy slasher film directed by Cindy Sherman and starring Carol Kane, Molly Ringwald, David Thornton, Jeanne Tripplehorn, Barbara Sukowa, and Michael Imperioli.

== Plot ==
A magazine editor named Dorine, due to budget cuts, is forced to work from home, living with her eccentric and infirm mother. One night, Dorine is called to help fix the computer of a co-worker, Gary Michaels, who is electrocuted while trying to fix the wires. Dorine dials 911, but hangs up when the call is answered. She places the corpse on a cart, rolls it down to her car, loads it in her trunk, and takes it home, placing it in her basement. Then, seemingly without reason, she goes on a murder spree.

She begins her spree by murdering another office worker, Virginia, but later murders two young Girl Scouts who arrive at her door to sell cookies. The young girls join the other corpses in the basement, and Dorine is seen eating the cookies while working on her laptop.

Dorine sends messages from Gary's email to the remaining office workers to create the impression he is alive. Late one night, Dorine murders Steve, the office mail courier, adding his corpse to the collection in her basement. The next day, Dorine strangles Kim, her disgruntled co-worker who has been fired, in the stairwell. Kim escapes, but is unable to identify her attacker.

The next assault is the office manager, Norah Reed, who awakens in the basement, surrounded by dismembered bodies, after being knocked out by Dorine on a lunch date. After dispatching Norah's boyfriend Daniel who has come searching for her, Dorine murders Norah after taunting her for embezzlement and making her and other employees work from home.

After her mother's death, Dorine sets fire to her basement, then drives off in a car wearing a blonde wig and makeup, with Norah's head in a bag on the passenger seat. Dorine circles a newspaper job ad for an office manager.

== Cast ==
- Carol Kane as Dorine Douglas
  - Rachel Aviva as young Dorine Douglas
- Molly Ringwald as Kim Poole
- Barbara Sukowa as Virginia Wingate
- Alice Drummond as Carlotta Douglas
  - Marceline Hugot as young Carlotta Douglas
- Eric Bogosian as Peter Douglas (uncredited)
- Jeanne Tripplehorn as Norah Reed
- Michael Imperioli as Daniel Birch
- David Thornton as Gary Michaels
- Michelle Hurst as Kate
- Julia McIlvaine as Linda
- Harley Kaplan as Steve
- Timothy Stickney as Paramedic

== Production ==
Office Killer was one in a planned series of low-budget horror movies by veteran indie producer Christine Vachon, with these films being intended to have budgets of around $300,000.

== Release ==
In addition to its U.S. theatrical release, it also received small theatrical releases in Australia, Japan, and some Western European countries.

=== Home media ===
In February 1999, the film was released on DVD and VHS in the United States by Dimension Home Video and Buena Vista Home Video.

In 2004, it was released on DVD in Australia by 20th Century Fox Home Entertainment South Pacific. In 2012, Echo Bridge Home Entertainment reissued it on DVD in the United States, with the company also handling several other Dimension reissues. In April 2020, worldwide distribution rights to the Miramax and pre-October 2005 Dimension library were acquired by ViacomCBS (now known as Paramount Skydance), with Office Killer being one of the films included in the deal. The Dimension Films/Miramax library had previously been controlled by The Walt Disney Company when Office Killer was first released.

Vinegar Syndrome released the film on 4K UHD Blu-ray in 2026.

== Reception ==
The film received a negative response from critics. On review aggregator website Rotten Tomatoes, the film holds a 29% rating, based on 21 reviews.

Stephen Holden of The New York Times claimed in December 1997 that the film included (with Barbara Sukowa as Virginia Wingate, imperious editor of the financially troubled Constant Consumer Magazine) "a nasty caricature of Arianna Stassinopoulos Huffington". He added that the film was "sadly inept" and that "the actors try gamely to rise above their cardboard roles." Derek Elley of Variety criticized the film's tone in his 1997 review. He wrote, "in its early stages, the film aims for a kind of modern-baroque spoofery, with Dorine nagged at home by her crippled mom, the women in the office all at each other's throats and Dorine herself toddling through the picture as the world's most unlikely mass murderer. However, the script is so lusterless, the pacing so leaden and the psychology so poorly worked out, that the pic doesn't even work as a black comedy. Later gore scenes just look silly."

In 1999, Mike Emery of The Austin Chronicle also had a mixed review, writing "perhaps Sherman should have concentrated on the realistic terror of staff meetings, 'casual day', and the office lunch room. Instead, we get frequent images that are typical of most horror movies and not really worth revisiting." AllMovie's Mark Deming gave it two and a half out of five stars, writing "where Wes Craven's Scream ridiculed slasher flick clichés in a way that appealed to hip, seen-it-all youngsters, Sherman's angle is more subversive as she seeks to uncover the serial killer lurking inside the meek, the dispirited, and the neglected amongst us. In that undertaking, she couldn't have gathered a better supporting cast." The film was included in Magill's Cinema Annual 1998: A Survey of the Films of 1997, with the book stating that "Office Killer is engaging because it raises questions about human identity in a sly, comic fashion".
