= Tom Kalin =

US filmmaker and professor (born 1962)

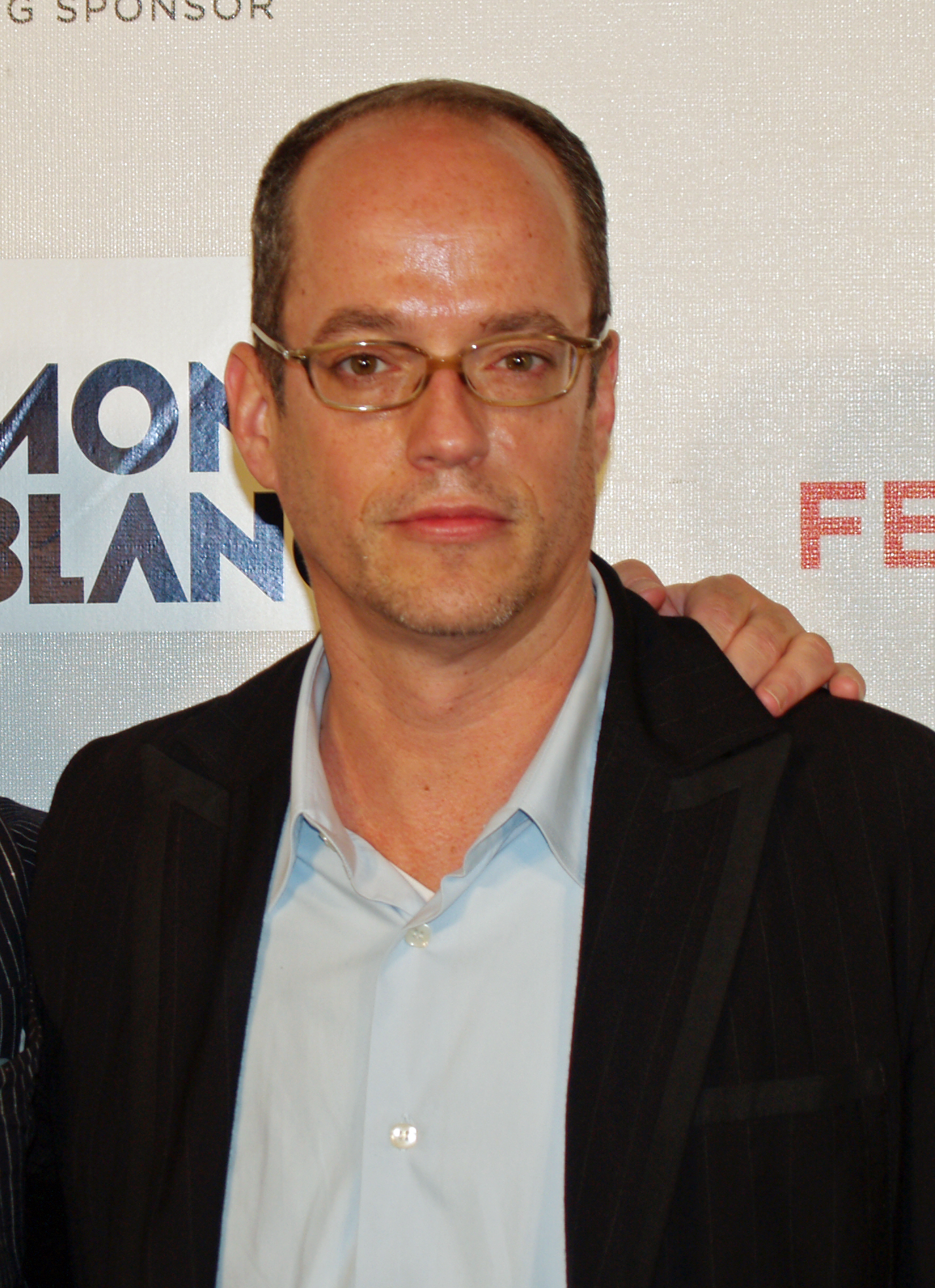
- Kalin at the premiere of Savage Grace at the 2008 Tribeca Film Festival.
- Born: March 4, 1962 (age 64); Chicago, Illinois, U.S.
- Education: University of Illinois, Urbana-Champaign (BFA); Art Institute of Chicago (MFA)
- Occupations: Director, screenwriter, producer
- Years active: 1989–present
- Awards: Berlin International Film Festival (1992), Gotham Awards (1992), New York Lesbian and Gay Film Festival (2002)

Tom Kalin (born 1962) is a screenwriter, film director, producer, and Professor of Professional Practice in Film at Columbia University in the City of New York.

His debut feature, Swoon, is considered an integral part of the New Queer Cinema. In addition to his feature work, Kalin has created a number of short films, many of which are collected in the compilations Behold Goliath or The Boy With the Filthy Laugh, Third Known Nest and Tom Kalin Videoworks: Volume 2.

Much of Kalin's work touches on issues of homosexuality (both modern-day and historical) and AIDS. He was a member of two AIDS direct action groups, ACT UP and Gran Fury. His work has won much critical acclaim and garnered a number of awards and nominations, including honors from the Berlin International Film Festival, Sundance Film Festival, Tribeca Film Fest and a number of gay and lesbian film festivals. Kalin won the Gotham Awards Open Palm Award (for Swoon) and has been nominated for two Independent Spirit Awards.

Kalin's 2007 feature film, Savage Grace , was the story of the 1972 Barbara Daly Baekeland murder case. Julianne Moore stars as Baekeland.

Kalin has taught graduate-level filmmaking classes at Columbia University School of the Arts, and is currently lecturing at the European Graduate School in Switzerland.

He is a 2011 Guggenheim Fellow.

== Life and career ==
=== Early life and education ===
Tom Kalin was born into a lower-middle-class Irish-Catholic family in Chicago, Illinois. His household consisted of 11 siblings, with the oldest being 19 years older than Kalin. Kalin received a BFA in painting from the University of Illinois in 1984 and a MFA in Photography and Video from The School of the Art Institute of Chicago in 1987.

=== Art and activism: Gran Fury & ACT UP ===
In the 1980s and 1990s, Tom Kalin worked with ACT UP and was one of the founding members of the AIDS activist artist coalition called Gran Fury. Gran Fury created public service announcement videos such as "Kissing Doesn't Kill", part of a campaign that included postcard mailing and city bus advertisements, whose intent was to raise awareness of the failures in government response.

=== Swoon ===
During the 1990s, Kalin began a project called Third Known Nest where he made a short 3-4 minute film every year that reflected the loss and pain caused by the AIDS epidemic. In an interview with the La Guardia and Wagner Archives, Kalin describes his belief in the importance of filmmaking: "I think there's something really valuable about making work and being honest about it in very ugly times. It's easy to make work in the happy times of life, but what I think is beneficial to other people is to try to be honest about really painful, difficult times in your life, and I think of that as that. I think of me telling the truth about what happened in a kind of indirect way – they're lyrical, short films; they don't explain everything."

Swoon, Kalin's feature film debut in 1992, was based on the 1924 Leopold and Loeb murder case. Unlike Rope, the 1948 Alfred Hitchcock film about the same case, Swoon sought to depict a stylized allegory relevant for an era filled with fear about the AIDS crisis and anger towards an unresponsive government. The reception to Swoon was mixed; the screening at the San Francisco Gay and Lesbian Film Festival caused criticism about the film's presentation of homosexual deviance. The film's purpose was not negative representation but was instead inspired by anger towards social causes for injustices such as the AIDS crisis, and the 1986 Bowers v. Hardwick case that was used criminalize homosexuality. Kalin wanted to make a "radical, political movie, actually, in a genre form", setting his story in a film noir background. The total cost of the film in 1992 was $250,000; it was filmed in 16mm within 14 days.

== Partial filmography ==
Director

- Swoon (1992)
- Nation (1992)
- Geoffrey Beene 30 (1993)
- Nomads (1994)
- Plain Pleasures (1996)
- Third Known Nest (1999)
- The Robots of Sodom (2003)
- Savage Grace (2007)
- 30/30 Vision: 3 Decades of Strand Releasing (segment "Looking Down on Everything I Crashed Into His Arms") (2019)

Writer

- Swoon (1992)
- Nation (1992)
- Geoffrey Beene 30 (1993)
- Office Killer (1997)
- Third Known Nest (1999)

Producer

- Swoon (1992) (co-producer)
- Go Fish (1994) (executive producer)
- I Shot Andy Warhol (1996)
