= Antony Byrne =

English actor (born 1969)

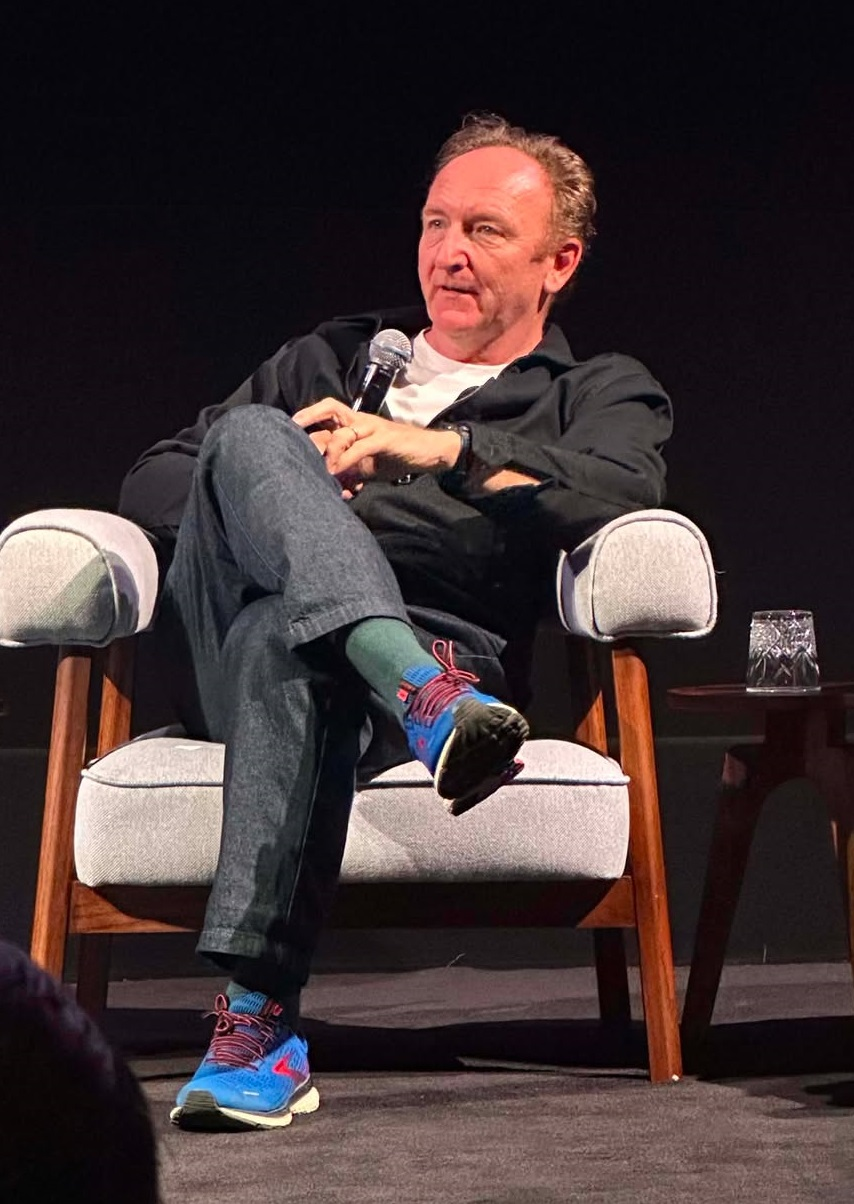
- Byrne at BAFTA Masterclass: The Art of Game Performance in Resident Evil Requiem in 2026
- Born: June 19, 1969 (age 57); Newcastle upon Tyne, England
- Education: Royal Central School of Speech and Drama
- Occupation: Actor
- Years active: 1991–present

Antony Byrne (born 19 June 1969) is an English actor, best known for his extensive stage work with the Royal Shakespeare Company (RSC). On television, he is known for his roles in the Disney+ series Rivals (2024), the Netflix series The Witcher (2019), the Starz series Outlander (2014). Since 2009, Byrne has provided the voice and motion capture for numerous video game characters, including Victor Gideon in Resident Evil: Requiem (2026).

== Early life and education ==
Antony Byrne was born on June 19, 1969, in Newcastle upon Tyne, England. There was no theatrical background to his family, but Byrne always wanted to perform on stage. After graduating from Whitley Bay High School, he successfully auditioned and did three years’ training at the Central School of Speech and Drama.

== Career ==
=== Theatre ===
When Byrne left Central, he landed the role of Orlando in As You Like It at the Crucible Theatre in Sheffield in 1991. After a season at the Crucible, Byrne performed with the Royal National Theatre and Bolton Octagon. In 1995, Byrne joined Royal Shakespeare Company (RSC) and did two plays in that season: he worked with Peter Hall on Julius Caesar, and he worked with Katie Mitchell on The Phoenician Women.

Byrne has played a wide range of Shakespearean roles, including Cinna and Lucilius in Julius Caesar, Aria and Oedipus in The Phoenician Women, Agrippa and Antony in Antony and Cleopatra, Sebastian in The Tempest, Duke of Montfort and King David in Edward III, Malvolio in Twelfth Night, King Henry VIII in Henry VIII, Macduff and Macbeth in Macbeth, Mowbray in Richard II, Worcester and Pistol in Henry IV, Pistol in Henry V, Earl of Kent in King Lear, Duke Senior and Duke Frederick in As You Like It, Duke of Vienna in Measure for Measure.

In 2017, Byrne starred as Antony in Antony and Cleopatra, staged by the Royal Shakespeare Company. Kate Kellaway of The Guardian praised his performance, stating: "Byrne’s Antony is an ordinary, erring, henpecked bloke, but when he leaves Cleopatra, promising to be a “man of steel”, he sounds, movingly, like a man of flesh, and I have seldom witnessed a more horribly realistic death on stage."

Byrne's major theatre credits also include Bassanio in The Merchant Of Venice, Edward Kelly in The Alchemical Wedding, Parthenius in The Roman Actor, Piniero in The Island Princess, Dad in Skellig, Jerry in Betrayal, Martin in Rutherford and Son, Dr. Treves in The Elephant Man, Heathcliff in Wuthering Heights, Charley Malloy in On the Waterfront, Agamemnon in After Troy, John Bailey and Dr Gibbons in Bracken Moor.

=== Television ===
In 1992, Byrne made his debut on television as Duncan in the ITV series Heartbeat. In 1994, he played Ginger Slater in the miniseries The Cinder Path, based on the novel of the same name by Catherine Cookson.

Byrne has appeared in numerous British television series, including The Inspector Alleyn Mysteries, Spender, Prime Suspect, Touching Evil, The Bill, Casualty, Playing the Field, 55 Degrees North, Doctors, The Royal, Timewatch, Midsomer Murders, Single-Handed, Emmerdale Farm, Silent Witness,The Suspicions of Mr Whicher, Coronation Street, Vera, Law & Order: UK, Jericho, Grace, Trigger Point.

In 2021, Byrne appeared as the Nilfgaardian general Hake in the second season of The Witcher on Netflix. Back in 2011, Byrne voiced King Foltest in The Witcher 2: Assassins of Kings.

In 2022, Byrne took the role of Hiram Crombie in the Starz series Outlander. In the Outlander novel, A Breath of Snow and Ashes, Hiram acts as an unofficial spokesperson for the families from Thurso. Also in 2022, Byrne portrayed an English football manager, Neil Warnock, in the television film Floodlights broadcast on BBC Two.

In 2023, Byrne was cast as an unscrupulous enforcer Ginger Baines in the Disney+ series Rivals (2024), based on the 1988 novel Rivals by Jilly Cooper, alongside a cast that included David Tennant, Alex Hassell and Nafessa Williams. In June 2026, Rivals was renewed for a third season.

=== Film ===
In film, Byrne's roles have tended to be smaller supporting parts. In 2006, he played the chilling role of a British interrogator in The Wind That Shakes the Barley. In 2012, he portrayed Colonel Demin in Anna Karenina. In 2014, Byrne played an English football administrator, Frederick Wall, in the French drama film United Passions.

=== Video Games ===
Byrne has provided the voice and motion capture performances for Victor Gideon in Resident Evil: Requiem and King Oswald in Ryse: Son of Rome. His other notable voice acting roles include King Foltest in The Witcher 2: Assassins of Kings, Vaudin in A Plague Tale: Requiem, Officer Bradley in Call of Cthulhu, Calhoun in Vampyr, Biggs in Final Fantasy XIV: Heavensward and Final Fantasy XIV: Shadowbringers.

== Filmography ==
=== Film ===
- 2006: The Wind That Shakes the Barley – The Interrogator
- 2007: Straightheads – Misha
- 2008: Bathory – Pastor Ponicky
- 2009: Thick as Thieves – Yaniushkin
- 2011: Mercenaries – Olodan Gragovic
- 2012: Anna Karenina – Colonel Demin
- 2014: United Passions – Frederick Wall

=== Television ===
Year	Title	Role	Notes
1992	Heartbeat	Duncan	Episode: “Face Value”
1993	Spender	Steve the Car Thief	Episode: “Best Friends”
1993	The Inspector Alleyn Mysteries	PC Dixon	Episode: “The Nursing Home Murder”
1994	The Cinder Path	Ginger Slater	Miniseries; 3 episodes
1995	Prime Suspect	DC Jason Headley	Episode: "The Scent of Darkness"
1997-1998	Touching Evil	Barry	7 episodes
1997-2003	The Bill	Gavin Rayner / P.C. Traven Keith / Haley	3 episodes
2000	Casualty	Donald Mortimer	Episode: "Phoenix"
2002	Playing the Field	Gordon	6 episodes
2004	55 Degrees North	Alan Holt	Episode "Officer Down"
2004-2012	Doctors	Steve / Stewart Hardy / Bill Kitt / Keith Marsh	4 episodes
2005	The Royal	Mr. Howarth	Episode: "It's What's on the Inside That Counts"
2005	Timewatch	Magnus	Episode: "Murder in Rome"
2005	The Government Inspector	Mark Damazer	Television film
2006	Midsomer Murders	Gary Talbot	Episode: "Country Matters"
2009	Single-Handed	Eddie McCann	2 episodes
2009	High Plains Invaders	Gus McGreevey	Television film
2009	Emmerdale Farm	Vincent Spode	12 episodes
2010	Bloody Foreigners	Ronald Kellet	Episode: "The Untold Battle of Britain"
2011	Silent Witness	Stephen Fisher	2 episodes
2011	The Suspicions of Mr Whicher	Reverend Wagner	Television film
2012	Coronation Street	D.S. Nash	8 episodes
2012	Vera	Craig	Episode: "Silent Voices"
2014	Law & Order: UK	DS Pete Langham	Episode: "I Predict a Riot"
2016	Jericho	Red Killeen	Episode #1.1
2021	The Witcher	General Hake	3 episodes
2022	Floodlights	Neil Warnock	Television film
2022	Grace	Jim Telby	Episode: "Dead Tomorrow"
2022-2026	Outlander	Hiram Crombie	13 episodes
2024	Trigger Point	Shaun Hodge	Episode #2.1
2024–present	Rivals	Ginger Baines	13 episodes

=== Video games ===
Year	Title	Role	Notes
2009	Risen	Felipe, Inquisition Guards, Marcelo, Santiago, Sergio	
2010	Fable III	Additional Voices	
2011	The Last Story	Kentis, Zepha	
2011	The Witcher 2: Assassins of Kings	King Foltest, Additional Voices	
2011	The Adventures of Tintin: The Secret of the Unicorn	Additional Voices	
2013	Soul Sacrifice	Librom	
2013	Remember Me	Charles Cartier-Wells	
2013	Ryse: Son of Rome	King Oswald	Also motion capture
2014	Assassin's Creed: Unity	Additional Voices	Also Dead Kings DLC
2015	Final Fantasy XIV: Heavensward	Biggs, Ilberd	
2018	Vampyr	Calhoun, Enforcer Graham, Harvey, Joe	
2018	Call of Cthulhu	Officer Bradley, Additional Voices	
2019	Final Fantasy XIV: Shadowbringers	Biggs, Cassard, Hyllfyr	
2019	Greedfall	Additional Voices	
2022	Dying Light 2: Stay Human	Additional Voices	
2022	A Plague Tale: Requiem	Vaudin	
2025	Blades of Fire	Thalmudak, Titan, Queen's Hounds, Thaumaturgists	
2026	Resident Evil: Requiem	Victor Gideon and supplementary characters (Zombie, Worker, Civilian, BSAA Radio)	Also motion capture

=== Theatre ===
==== Selected works ====
Year	Title	Role	Director	Theatre company	Venue	Ref.
1991	As You Like It	Orlando	Mark Brickman	Sheffield Theatres	Crucible Theatre, Sheffield	
1991-1992	The Madness Of George III	John Hoppner	Nicholas Hytner	Royal National Theatre	National Theatre, Lyttelton Theatre, London	
1993	Trelawny of the “Wells”	Mr Huston	John Caird	Royal National Theatre	National Theatre, Olivier Theatre, London	
1993	Macbeth	First Murderer	Richard Eyre	Royal National Theatre	National Theatre, Olivier Theatre, London	
1994	Time And The Conways	Gerald Thornton	Lawrence Till	Octagon Theatre	Octagon Theatre, Bolton	
1994	Blood Wedding	Leonardo	Lawrence Till	Octagon Theatre	Octagon Theatre, Bolton	
1995	Macbeth	Witch/Seyton	Lawrence Till	Octagon Theatre	Octagon Theatre, Bolton	
1995-1996	Julius Caesar	Cinna / Lucilius / Casca	Peter Hall	Royal Shakespeare Company	Royal Shakespeare Theatre, Stratford-upon-Avon; Barbican Theatre, London; The Workshop Season in Shakespeare's Globe, London	
1995-1996	The Phoenician Women	Aria / Oedipus	Katie Mitchell	Royal Shakespeare Company	The Pit, London; Gulbenkian Studio, Newcastle upon Tyne	
1996	La Nuit de Valognes	Sganarelle	Paul Garrington	Royal Shakespeare Company	Season of International Drama at The Other Place, Stratford-upon-Avon	
1996	The Merchant Of Venice	Bassanio	Jonathan Church	Salisbury Arts Theatre Ltd	Salisbury Playhouse	
1997	Jane Eyre	Brocklehurst / Lord Ingram / Pilot the Dog / St. John Rivers	Polly Teale	Shared Experience	Wolsey Theatre, Ipswich; Cambridge Arts Theatre, and touring	
1998	The Alchemical Wedding	Edward Kelly	Jonathan Church	Salisbury Arts Theatre Ltd	Salisbury Playhouse	
1999-2000	Antony and Cleopatra	Agrippa	Steven Pimlott	Royal Shakespeare Company	Royal Shakespeare Theatre, Stratford-upon-Avon; Barbican Theatre, London; Theatre Royal, Newcastle upon Tyne; Theatre Royal, Plymouth	
1999	Tales from Ovid	Man / Midas / Pentheus	Tim Supple	Royal Shakespeare Company	Swan Theatre, Stratford-upon-Avon	
1999	A Warwickshire Testimony	George	Alison Sutcliffe	Royal Shakespeare Company	The Other Place, Stratford-upon-Avon	
1999	La Maison Suspendue	Mathieu	Timothy Sheader	Royal Shakespeare Company	The Other Place, Stratford-upon-Avon	
2000-2001	The Tempest	Sebastian	James Macdonald	Royal Shakespeare Company	The Pit, Barbican Centre, London, and touring	
2002-2003	Edward III	Duke of Montfort / King David	Anthony Clark	Royal Shakespeare Company	Swan Theatre, Stratford-upon-Avon	
2002-2003	The Roman Actor	Parthenius	Sean Holmes	Royal Shakespeare Company	Swan Theatre, Stratford-upon-Avon; Gielgud Theatre, London	
2002-2003	The Island Princess	Piniero	Gregory Doran	Royal Shakespeare Company	Swan Theatre, Stratford-upon-Avon; Gielgud Theatre, London	
2003-2004	Skellig	Dad	Trevor Nunn	Young Vic Company	Young Vic Theatre, London	
2004	Betrayal	Jerry	Peter Hall	Peter Hall Company,Theatre Royal Bath Productions	Richmond Theatre, London; Palace Theatre, Manchester, and touring	
2005	Twelfth Night	Malvolio	Ian Brown	Leeds Playhouse	Leeds Playhouse	
2005	Rutherford and Son	Martin	Sarah Frankcom	Royal Exchange, Manchester	Royal Exchange, Manchester	
2006	Henry VIII	King Henry VIII	Gregory Thompson	Royal Shakespeare Company	Holy Trinity Church, Stratford-upon-Avon	
2007	Macbeth	Macduff	Ian Brown	Leeds Playhouse	Leeds Playhouse	
2007	Macbeth	Macbeth	Edward Kemp	New Shakespeare Company	Regent's Park Open Air Theatre, London	
2008	The Elephant Man	Dr Treves	Ellie Jones	Sheffield Theatres	Lyceum Theatre, Sheffield, and touring	
2008	Wuthering Heights	Heathcliff	Indhu Rubasingham	Birmingham Repertory Company and The Touring Consortium	Birmingham Repertory Theatre	
2009	On the Waterfront	Charley Malloy	Steven Berkoff	Nottingham Playhouse and East Productions	Theatre Royal Haymarket, London	
2011	After Troy	Agamemnon	Alex Clifton	Lifeblood Theatre Company and the Onassis Programme	Oxford Playhouse; Shaw Theatre, London, and touring	
2013	Bracken Moor	John Bailey / Dr Gibbons	Polly Teale	Shared Experience	Tricycle Theatre, London	
2013-2014	Richard II	Thomas Mowbray	Gregory Doran	Royal Shakespeare Company	Royal Shakespeare Theatre, Stratford-upon-Avon; Barbican Theatre, London	
2014-2015	Henry IV, Part 1	Earl Of Worcester	Gregory Doran	Royal Shakespeare Company	Royal Shakespeare Theatre, Stratford-upon-Avon; Barbican Theatre, London	
2014-2015	Henry IV, Part 2	Pistol / Porter / Rumour	Gregory Doran	Royal Shakespeare Company	Royal Shakespeare Theatre, Stratford-upon-Avon; Barbican Theatre, London	
2015-2016	Henry V	Pistol	Gregory Doran	Royal Shakespeare Company	Royal Shakespeare Theatre, Stratford-upon-Avon; Barbican Theatre, London	
2016, 2018	King Lear	Earl of Kent	Gregory Doran	Royal Shakespeare Company	Royal Shakespeare Theatre, Stratford-upon-Avon, Barbican Theatre, London; Brooklyn Academy of Music, New York	
2017-2018	Antony and Cleopatra	Antony	Iqbal Khan	Royal Shakespeare Company	Royal Shakespeare Theatre, Stratford-upon-Avon; Barbican Theatre, London	
2019-2020	As You Like It	Duke Senior / Duke Frederick	Kimberley Sykes	Royal Shakespeare Company	Royal Shakespeare Theatre, Stratford-upon-Avon; Barbican Theatre, London	
2019-2020	Measure for Measure	Duke of Vienna	Gregory Doran	Royal Shakespeare Company	Royal Shakespeare Theatre, Stratford-upon-Avon; Barbican Theatre, London	

=== Other ===
Year	Title	Role	Notes	Ref.
1995	The Sunday Play: Henry IV, Part 1 and Henry IV, Part 2	John of Lancaster	Directed by Michael Fox on BBC Radio 3	
2013	RSC Live: Richard II	Thomas Mowbray	RSC Live from Stratford-upon-Avon; relayed to cinemas, and later released on video	
2014	RSC Live: Henry IV, Part 1	Earl Of Worcester	RSC Live from Stratford-upon-Avon; relayed to cinemas, and later released on video	
2014	RSC Live: Henry IV, Part 2	Pistol	RSC Live from Stratford-upon-Avon; relayed to cinemas, and later released on video	
2016	RSC Live: Henry V	Pistol	RSC Live from Stratford-upon-Avon; relayed to cinemas, and later released on video	
2016	RSC Live: King Lear	Earl of Kent	RSC Live from Stratford-upon-Avon; relayed to cinemas, and later released on video	
2017	RSC Live: Antony and Cleopatra	Antony	RSC Live from Stratford-upon-Avon; relayed to cinemas, and later released on video	
2018	Antony and Cleopatra: Music & Speeches	Antony	CD featuring extracts from Antony and Cleopatra (2017)	
2019	RSC Live: As You Like It	Duke Senior / Duke Frederick	RSC Live from Stratford-upon-Avon; relayed to cinemas, and later released on video	
2019	RSC Live: Measure for Measure	The Duke	RSC Live from Stratford-upon-Avon; relayed to cinemas, and later released on video	
2020	Sonnets in Solitude	Narrator	A selection of Shakespeare's sonnets recorded by RSC actors	
2026	Walking Shadow: Love, Loss and Shakespeare	Narrator	Reading the lines of Antony Sher in the audiobook by Gregory Doran	
