= Jamie Flatters =

English actor and filmmaker

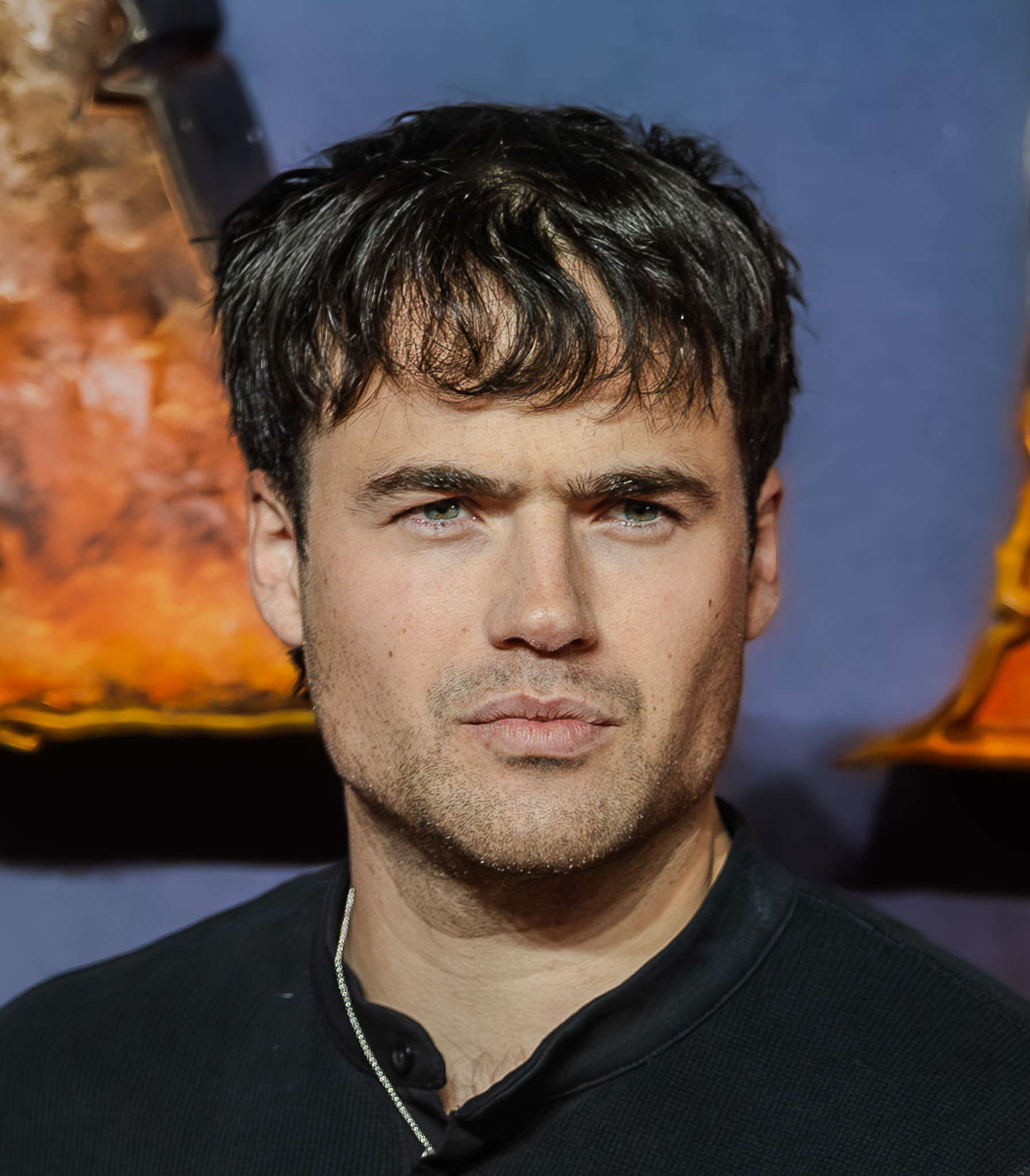
- Flatters in 2025
- Born: 7 July 2000 (age 26); Lambeth, London, England
- Other name: Sandy Crow (Note: Stylized in all lowercase.)
- Occupations: Actor; director; writer; singer; musician
- Years active: 2013–present

Jamie Flatters (born 7 July 2000) is an English actor, filmmaker and singer. He began his career as a child actor on stage and in the CBBC sitcom So Awkward (2015–2016). His films include The Forgotten Battle (2020), Avatar: The Way of Water, The School for Good and Evil (both 2022), and Black Dog (2023).

== Early life ==
Flatters was born in the London Borough of Lambeth to parents Paul Flatters and Anna Grey and grew up in Clapham. He has two brothers, George and Matthew. He attended Lambeth Academy.

== Career ==
Flatters was in an alternating role, as Edgar, in the original Tricycle Theatre cast of the 2013 play Bracken Moor. Flatters made his television debut in 2015 as Matt Furnish in the CBBC sitcom So Awkward, a role he played for the first two series. In 2017, Flatters began starring as Luke Earlham, the son of Andrew Earlham in the ITV thriller Liar. Flatters featured in both series of Liar.

Flatters made his feature film debut as English Allied pilot William Sinclair in the multilingual World War II film The Forgotten Battle alongside Gijs Blom and Susan Radder. It is the second most expensive Dutch film production of all time and had an international release on Netflix in 2021. That same year, Flatters appeared in the Channel 4 miniseries Close to Me.

In 2022, Flatters played Tedros in the Netflix film adaptation of The School for Good and Evil and Neteyam, Jake and Neytiri's eldest son, in James Cameron's Avatar: The Way of Water, the latter of which Flatters auditioned for when he was sixteen. He co-wrote the script for George Jaques' feature film Black Dog, in which Flatters also starred in. The premiere of the film took place at the BFI London Film Festival on 14 October 2023, where it was selected for the competition program of First Feature Competition and nominated the Sutherland Award.

In May 2024, Flatters joined the cast of PBS Masterpiece new adaptation of The Forsyte Saga as Philip Bosinney. Flatters’ film Black Dog competed at the 2024 Riviera International Film Festival, where he won the Baia Del Silenzio Award for Best Actor and the film won the Baia del Silenzio Redelfi Award. In October 2024, Flatters joined the cast of Benacus Entertainment’s horror 'Your Host' as Harry. On 27 November 2024, Flatters directorial debut feature film 'SHOULDERS' had its world premiere at the Clapham International Film Festival.

On 22 August 2025, Flatters's film Your Host had its premiere at FrightFest London. He attended an exclusive screening for The Forsyte Saga in Soho Hotel London on 2th September 2025. He appeared as Neteyam via a cameo in the 2025 sequel Avatar: Fire and Ash.

== Personal life ==
Flatters has advocated for lowering the UK voting age to 16, and became a member of the Almeida Theatre's Young Leaders programme. Flatters is an eloquent speaker and previously won Jack Petchey's "Speak Out" challenge Lambeth Regional Final and he came runner-up at the Grand Final in 2015.

== Filmography ==
=== Film ===
Year	Title	Role	Notes
2019	Silence		Short film
2019	Soak		Short film
2020	The Forgotten Battle	William Sinclair	
2020	Kernel		Short film
2020	Snow Crash		Short film
2020	Tower of Babel		Short film
2021	Tuesday	Robbie	Short film
2021	Baby		Short film
2022	Attrition		Short film
2022	The School for Good and Evil	Tedros	Netflix film
2022	Avatar: The Way of Water	Neteyam	
2023	What is Shelf-Love?	Himself	Short film
2023	Thunderowl		Short film
2023	Black Dog	Nathan	Also co-writer and producer
2023	The White Hart	James	Short Film
2024	THAT NIGHT	Harry	Short film
2024	O (So Say the Circle is Round)	O	Short film
2025	Your Host	James	
2025	Avatar: Fire and Ash	Neteyam	Cameo
2026	FindMy	Milo	Short film
TBA	Of Four		Short film

==== As filmmaker ====
Year	Title	Director	Writer	Producer	Notes
2017	Men	Yes	No	No	Short film
2018	Good Trouble: What if the Suit Chokes?	Yes	No	Yes	Short film
2019	Soak	—N/a	Yes	—N/a	Short film
2020	Kernel	Yes	—N/a	—N/a	Short film
2022	These Spinning Straight Lines	Yes	Yes	Yes	Short film
2023	All Things Connected	Yes	No	No	Short documentary
2023	What Looking Gave Us	Yes	No	No	Short documentary
2023	The Luxury Of Sitting	Yes	Yes	No	Short film
2023	I don't believe you're hurting	Yes	Yes	—N/a	Short film
2023	Golden Syrup Cake Brick Work	Yes	Yes	—N/a	Short film
2023	Black Dog	No	Yes	Yes	
2023	When You're Moody	Yes	Yes	Yes	Short film
2024	SHOULDERS	Yes	Yes	Yes	Debut feature film
2025	what looms.	Yes	No	Yes	short documentary

=== Television ===
Year	Title	Role	Notes
2015–2016	So Awkward	Matt Furnish	Main role; 26 episodes
2016	Flat TV	Kieran	Episode: "Nemesis"
2017–2020	Liar	Luke Earlham	Main role; 10 episodes
2021	Close to Me	Owen	Miniseries; 4 episodes
2025–present	The Forsytes	Philip Bosinney	Main role; 11 episodes

== Music videos ==
Year	Track	Artist	Notes
2014	Defined	Ronan Parke	Released on 5 January 2014
2023	FADE	Callinsick	Released on 13 September 2023
2024	LEARNING 037	sandy crow (himself)	Released on 11 March 2024
2024	Ur Best Day	sandy crow (himself)	Released on 11 March 2024
2024	Regret it	sandy crow (himself)	Released on 24 April 2024
2024	Waiting for life (acoustic version)	sandy crow (himself)	Released on 9 May 2024
2024	Handgun Wisdom	sandy crow (himself)	Released on 22 May 2024
2024	Godard The Director	sandy crow (himself)	Released on 3 July 2024
2024	Plano	sandy crow (himself)	Released on 22 August 2024
2025	Mud of Emotion	sandy crow (himself)	Released on 7 March 2025
2025	Big Scare	sandy crow (himself)	Released on 6 May 2025
2025	BART	sandy crow (himself)	Released on 30 May 2025
2025	Detergent	sandy crow (himself)	Released on 27 June 2025
2025	Pinch	sandy crow (himself)	Released on 19 September 2025
2026	Fresh Dirt	sandy crow (himself)	Released on 2 May 2026
2026	Denny's lyric video	sandy crow (himself)	Released on 3 June 2026
2026	Apartment Building	sandy crow (himself)	Released on 7 June 2026
2026	Adrenaline Kingdom	sandy crow (himself)	Released on 11 June 2026
2026	Denny's (Official video)	sandy crow (himself)	Released on 14 June 2026
2026	JITTER!	sandy crow (himself)	Released on 16 June 2026

== Stage ==
Year	Title	Role	Notes	Type
2013	Bracken Moor	Edgar (alternating)	Tricycle Theatre, London	play
2017	Dilate	Charlie	Testbed1, London	play
2017	Tarantiseismic	one of the 39 dancers	premiered Sadler's Wells, London and played seven other location on tour	dance performance

== Discography ==
Flatters’ stage name is Sandy Crow.

His debut single, Learning 037 was released on 6 March 2024. Flatters released his second single, Regret it on 24 April 2024. And his third single, Handgun wisdom on 22 May 2024. His fourth single, Godard the Director, was released on 3 July 2024. His fifth single, Plano, was released on 22 August 2024. His sixth single, Mud of Emotion, was released on 7 March 2025. His seventh single, Big Scare, was released on 2 May 2025. His eighth single, BART, was released on 30 May 2025. His ninth single, Detergent, was released on 27 June 2025. His tenth single, Pinch, was released on 19 September 2025. His tenth single, Fresh Dirt, was released on May 1, 2026.

Sandy Crow's debut album released on June 3rd, 2026.

=== Singles ===
Year	Single title	Track	Notes
2024	LEARNING 037	Learning 037	Debut single, Released on 6 March 2024
2024	LEARNING 037	Ur Best Day	Debut single, Released on 6 March 2024
2024	Regret it	Regret it	Released on 24 April 2024
2024	Handgun wisdom	Handgun wisdom	Released on 22 May 2024
2024	Godard The Director	Godard The Director	Released on 3 July 2024
2024	Plano	Plano	Released on 22 August 2024
2025	Mud of Emotion	Mud of Emotion	Released on 7 March 2025
2025	Big Scare	Big Scare	Released on 2 May 2025
2025	BART	BART	Released on 30 May 2025
2025	Detergent	Detergent	Released on 27 June 2025
2025	Pinch	Pinch	Released on 19 September 2025
2026	Fresh Dirt	Fresh Dirt	Released on 1 May 2026

=== Studio albums ===
Year	Album title	Tracks	Notes
2026	It hurts fantastic	Apartment Building	Debut album, Released on 3 June 2026
2026	It hurts fantastic	one second more	Debut album, Released on 3 June 2026
2026	It hurts fantastic	Fresh Dirt	Debut album, Released on 3 June 2026
2026	It hurts fantastic	mama	Debut album, Released on 3 June 2026
2026	It hurts fantastic	Adrenaline Kingdom	Debut album, Released on 3 June 2026
2026	It hurts fantastic	JITTER!	Debut album, Released on 3 June 2026
2026	It hurts fantastic	liquid shot	Debut album, Released on 3 June 2026
2026	It hurts fantastic	Denny's	Debut album, Released on 3 June 2026
2026	It hurts fantastic	Anywhere But Here	Debut album, Released on 3 June 2026
2026	It hurts fantastic	NO GOOD MAN	Debut album, Released on 3 June 2026

=== Other releases ===
Year	Track	Notes
2020	LOST IN ACTION	ft. LEO & sandy crow
2023	Where this goes	Demo
2023	The Deepest End	Demo
2023	I SAW YOU SAY IT	Demo
2023	Sculpting in time	Demo
2023	BONNEVILLE	Demo
2023	WAITING FOR LIFE	Demo
2024	Plastic Red Spade	Demo
2024	In Between Talking	live acoustic version
2025	Boobytrap	
2025	Blood rainbow	
2025	did I	produced by couros
2025	breathe into this	Demo
2025	the full shit show	Full concert video
2025	baby photos	

=== Concerts ===
Year	Date	Place	Note
2024	25 July	The Waiting Room, London, UK	First concert
2024	16 December	Folklore Hoxton, London, UK	Second concert
2024	19 December	Nothing Hill Arts Club, London, UK	Part of "Shades of Blue" event
2025	13 May	Windmill Brixton, London, UK	Bandsintown
2025	16 May	The Grate Escape Festival, Brighton, UK	Revenge Club

== Awards and nominations ==
Year	Event	Award	Category	Notes	Nominated work	Result	Ref.
2024	Riviera International Film Festival	Baia Del Silenzio Award	Best Actor	—N/a	Black Dog	Won	
2024	Riviera International Film Festival	Baia Del Silenzio Redelfi Award	Best Film	shared with: George Jaques, Ken Petrie, Ian Sharp	Black Dog	Won	
2024	Glasgow Film Festival	Best Film	Best film	shared with: George Jaques, Ken Petrie, Ian Sharp	Black Dog	Nominated	
2024	Bahamas International Film Festival	World Cinema	Best Feature Film	shared with: George Jaques, Ken Petrie, Ian Sharp	Black Dog	Nominated	
2024	Bahamas International Film Festival	World Cinema	Best Actor	—N/a	Black Dog	Won	
2024	Cornwall Film Festival	Sub-Awards	Best Ensemble Performance	Shared with: Ebenezer Gyau, Naomi Wakszlak	That Night	Won	

== Interviews ==
Year	Date	Title	Magazine	Ref.	Note
2022	November 24	‘Avatar 2’ star Jamie Flatters on swapping Clapham for Pandora	TimeOut London		About his role in avatar: The Way Of Water
2022	December 8	Jamie Flatters on Playing Neteyam in Avatar: The Way of Water	D23		About his role in the Avatar: The Way Of Water
2022	December 17	THE ACTOR AS AN ARTIST	Behind The Blinds		About his career
2023	October 16	Conversations - Jamie Flatters and George Jaques	Boys By Girls		About Black Dog movie
2024	March 15	SANDY CROW	Wonderland.		About his music persona sandy crow
2024	November 15	Jamie Flatters on his woozy and wonderful directorial debut	Square Mile		About his directorial debut
2025	March 18	Jamie Flatters is doing everything, everywhere, all at once	Square Mile		About his debut feature film and his music persona
2026	June 18	Avatar Star, Musician: Sandy Crow Does It All – And It Hurts Fantastic	The Cold Magazine		About his debut album
