= Forever Rich =

- Directed by: Emre Gül
- Written by: Slim Shady El-Hamus; Jeroen Scholten van Aschat
- Starring: Yootha Wong-Loi-Sing; Hadewych Minis; Jonas Smulders
- Production company: Fiction Valley
- Distributed by: Netflix
- Release date: October 1, 2021
- Running time: 89 minutes
- Country: Netherlands
- Language: Dutch

Forever Rich is a 2021 Dutch film directed by Shady El-Hamus, written by Shady El-Hamus and Jeroen Scholten van Aschat and starring Yootha Wong-Loi-Sing, Hadewych Minis and Jonas Smulders. It was released on October 1, 2021, by Netflix.

== Cast ==
- Yootha Wong-Loi-Sing as Jessica
- Hadewych Minis as Els
- Jonas Smulders as Richie
- Matteo van der Grijn
- Sinem Kavus as Anna
- Mustafa Duygulu as Abdel
- Andrew Tate as White Mask
- Daniël Kolf as Tony
- Simon van Lammeren
- Zoë
