= Emma Westenberg =

Emma Westenberg is a Dutch film director, writer and producer known for her work in feature films, short films, commercials and music videos. She gained international recognition for directing Janelle Monáe's music video Pynk (2018), which was nominated for the Grammy Award for Best Music Video. She directed Bleeding Love (film) (2023), starring Ewan McGregor and Clara McGregor.

== Career ==
Westenberg studied at the Gerrit Rietveld Academie in Amsterdam. Her graduation film, Het stilleven van Estelle (The Still Life of Estelle), was selected for the Netherlands Film Festival Student Competition.

She subsequently directed short films, such as the 2015 short “Je vriendin koopt een vis op de markt”, and Burning Oceans Into Deserts, which was described as a "contemporary take on the American western". She makes commercials for clients including Levi's, Vogue, ASOS and Michelob Ultra. Her commercial for Michelob Ultra starring Zoë Kravitz premiered during Super Bowl LIII.

In 2018, Westenberg directed Janelle Monáe's music video Pynk, featuring Tessa Thompson. The video received widespread critical acclaim and was nominated for the Grammy Award for Best Music Video at the 61st Annual Grammy Awards. Its distinctive pink "vagina pants", designed by Dutch fashion designer Duran Lantink, became an iconic visual element of the video.

She was announced to direct the film Buffalo Flats in 2019.

She made her fiction feature debut with You Sing Loud, I Sing Louder, which went on to be renamed Bleeding Love, starring Ewan McGregor and Clara McGregor, and premiered in 2023. The film has been described as a horror work hiding in a drama.

== Selected filmography ==
=== Feature films ===
- ''Bleeding Love (film) (2023)

=== Short films ===
- Het stilleven van Estelle (2014)
- A Painful Affair (2017)
- Stranger's Arms (2018)
- “Je vriendin koopt een vis op de markt” (2015)

=== Music videos ===
- Pynk – Janelle Monáe (2018)

== Awards and nominations ==
- 2016 – Best New Fashion Film, Fashion Film Festival Milano (Blue and You)
- 2017 – One to Watch, Fashionclash Festival
- 2019 – Grammy Award nomination, Best Music Video (Pynk)
- 2019 – Best Dutch Music Video, Go Short International Short Film Festival (Pynk)
