= Jongens =

- Dutch theatrical poster
- Written by: Chris Westendorp; Jaap-Peter Enderle
- Directed by: Mischa Kamp
- Starring: Gijs Blom; Ko Zandvliet; Jonas Smulders; Ton Kas
- Music by: Rutger Reinders
- Country of origin: Netherlands
- Original language: Dutch

Production
- Producers: Iris Otten; Sander van Meurs; Pieter Kuijpers
- Cinematography: Melle van Essen
- Editor: Katarina Türler
- Running time: 76 minutes
- Production company: Pupkin Film

Original release
- Release: 9 February 2014

Jongens (English title: Boys) is a 2014 Dutch made-for-television coming-of-age romantic drama film directed by Mischa Kamp and featuring Gijs Blom, Ko Zandvliet and Stijn Taverne. The film was released on 9 February 2014.

== Plot ==
Sieger is a fifteen-year-old boy, living with his widowed father, Theo, and his brother, Eddy, who, burdened with his mother's death, clashes with and acts out against his father. Along with his best friend (Stef), Sieger is a member of the local athletics team. They—and two other boys, Tom and Marc—are chosen to represent the team at the national championship relay race. In order to win, they must train intensively.

One day, they decide to go swimming in a nearby river. After Stef and Tom leave, Sieger and Marc share two kisses. Confused, Sieger insists that he is not gay, to which Marc responds, "Of course you're not," before Sieger heads home. Despite the incident, the boys remain close friends. When Stef meets and begins dating a local girl named Kim, Sieger feels pressured to romance Kim's best friend, Jessica, and suppress his feelings for Marc.

One weekend, the athletics team goes on a training trip. On the first night, Sieger sneaks out, and Marc follows him to the beach, where they spend the rest of the night kissing and resting in each other's arms. When they return home, Sieger, Jessica, Stef, and Kim attend a fair. Also at the fair, Marc sees them and wants to join up. However, afraid that the truth will come out, Sieger tries to ignore Marc. He manages to distract and appease Jessica by winning her a stuffed animal; and after, Jessica kisses Sieger, stirring feelings of confusion and pain for Marc.

Some days later, Sieger attempts to make up with Marc, and they agree to go swimming that evening. However, Theo and Eddy get into a fight after Theo learns Eddy was fired from his job a while ago and has been spending the time riding motorbikes with his friends. Theo locks up the motorbike. Instead of going to the river, Sieger tries to convince his brother to come home. Eddy will not heed his pleas but offers him a ride in a car he is driving. On the way, they almost hit Marc while he is riding his bike. Marc gets the chance to ask Sieger why he did not turn up at their appointment, and Sieger, afraid to be caught speaking to Marc, does not answer him and walks off.

On the day of the relay race, Sieger offers Marc a simple "sorry" which Marc, waiting for an explanation that does not come, tells Sieger to go back to his "charade". Despite this, the team wins. Sieger, Eddy, Theo, and Stef celebrate with dinner at Sieger's house, where Theo gives Eddy back his motorbike. Stef reveals that he knows about Sieger and Marc, telling Sieger "that they make a good team". At dinner, Theo notices Sieger acting rather introverted and asks if he is okay. Sieger answers "no" and jumps on the motorbike, and drives away.

The final scene shows Sieger driving Eddy's motorbike with Marc on the back, embracing him. Perhaps to the beach, but as the words of the final song indicates, Sieger is on a journey of self-acceptance. They are finally together and appear to be happy.

== Cast ==
- Gijs Blom as Sieger
- Ko Zandvliet as Marc
- Jonas Smulders as Eddy
- Ton Kas as Theo
- Stijn Taverne as Stef
- Myron Wouts as Tom
- Ferdi Stofmeel as Coach
- Lotte Razoux Schultz as Jessica
- Rachelle Verdel as Kim
- Julia Akkermans as Eddy's girlfriend
- Jeffrey Hamilton as Niclas
- Rifka Lodeizen as Marc's mother
- Micha Hulshof as snack bar owner
- Caroline Olde Rikkert as perfume shop owner
- Roosmarijn van der Hoek as Neeltje

== Background ==
On 9 February 2014, the movie was first screened on NPO Zapp, a Dutch channel for children and young teens. The movie was a success, so film distributor ABC Cinemien/ABC Distribution decided to release the movie in Dutch theatres. This release was also a success so the film was sold to the United States, United Kingdom, Taiwan, Poland, France and Germany. Furthermore, the movie was shown at the Seattle International Film Festival, the Vancouver Queer Film Festival, the Out-on-Film-Festival in Atlanta and Frameline Film Festival. The film was also picked up by Netflix and later by other streaming services such as Prime Video.

== Soundtrack ==
Sound design and mixing was done by Marco Vermaas and some music was produced by Rutger Reinders.

- "I Apologize (Dear Simon)" by Moss (Intro & Closing Song)
- "Love Like This" by Kodaline
- "Just a Boy" by Angus & Julia Stone
- "Princes" by Oscar & The Wolf
- "Midnight City" by M83

== Awards ==
The movie won four awards at the Zlín-Jugendfilmfestival 2014 in the Czech Republic:

- First award international youth jury for best youth movie
- First award international oecumenical jury
- Public award "Golden Apple" for best movie
- Miloš Macourek Award for best youth actor in a youth movie given to Gijs Blom
