= Bilal Wahib =

Dutch actor, singer and rapper

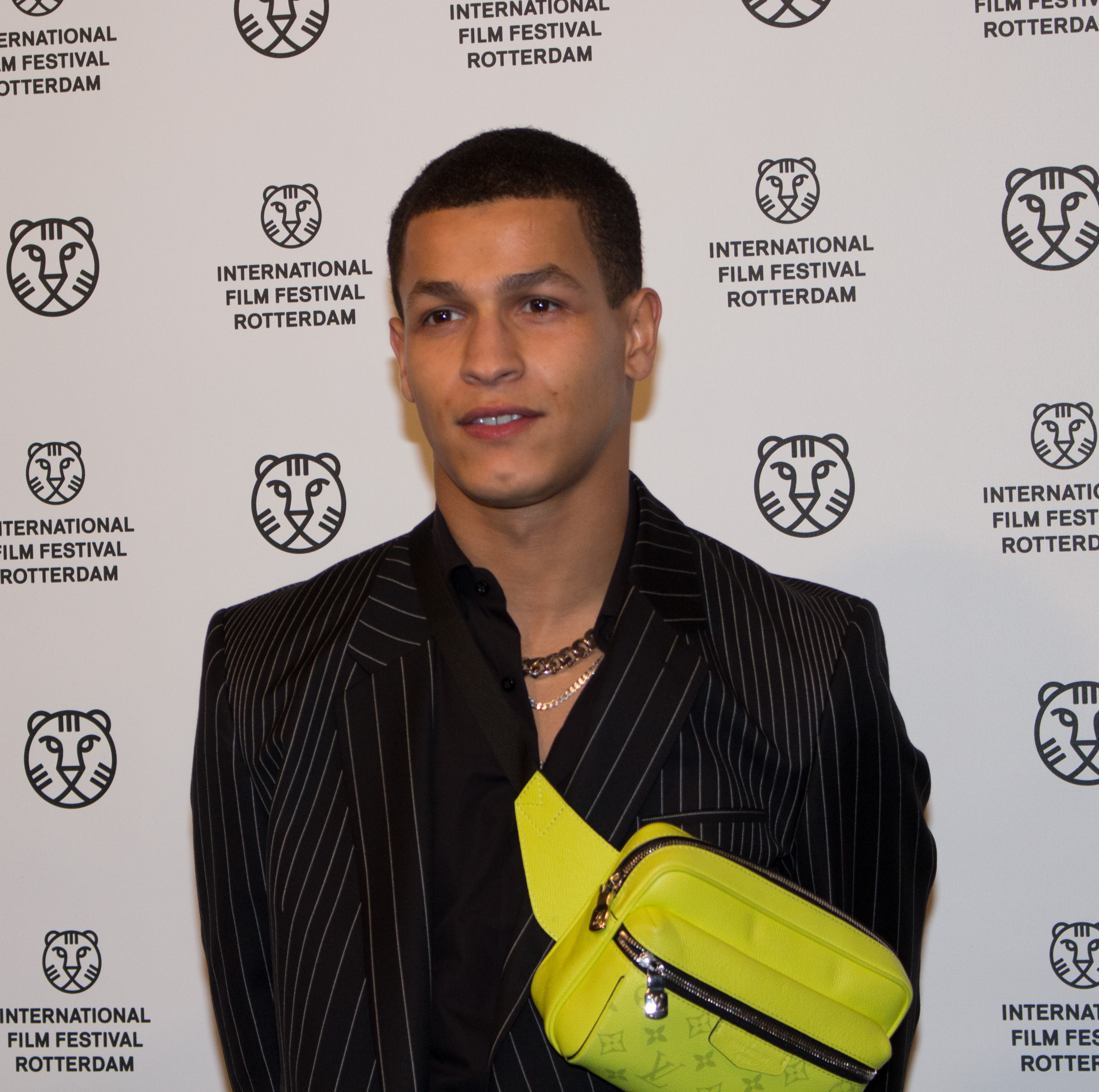
- Bilal Wahib during IFFR ceremonies in 2020

Background information
- Born: 20 January 1999 (age 27); Amsterdam, Netherlands
- Occupations: Actor; singer; rapper
- Years active: 2013–present

Bilal El Mehdi Wahib (born 20 January 1999) is a Dutch actor, singer and rapper from Amsterdam. He has appeared in several Dutch films and series such as Nieuwe buren, SpangaS, Mocro Maffia and Commando's and films Layla M., De Held, De libi and Paradise Drifters, portrayed mainly in ethnic roles. In 2020, he won the Golden Calf for Best Supporting Actor for his role in Paradise Drifters in the role of Yousef. He is also known for his singles "Tigers" and "501", which both peaked at number three on the Dutch Top 40 chart while topping the Dutch Single Top 100 chart.

== Music career ==
Besides frequent appearances on screen, he also developed a music career with a number of singles starting in 2019. His debut charting single was from the soundtrack of the film he had a role in, De libi, resulting in the single "Vliegen". His 2020 hit "Tigers" and his 2021 hit "501" both topped the Dutch Single Top 100 chart and peaked at number 3 on the Dutch Top 40 charts. He was nominated to top 5 of the MTV Europe Music Award for Best Dutch Act for 2020 but did not win.

== Controversy ==
In March 2021, Wahib was arrested by Amsterdam police on suspicion of manufacturing and distributing child pornography after he asked a 12-year-old boy to show his penis during Wahib's Instagram livestream in exchange for 17,000 euros, a request the boy acted upon. It was intended as a pun, based on the fact that in Dutch the same phrase can mean "if you can show your penis" as well as "if you can make your penis see". This resulted in Wahib being dropped from BNNVARA and his record label TopNotch. He was also banned for life from Instagram. In February 2022, Wahib returned to Instagram but his account was deactivated shortly after.

In November 2021, the Public Prosecution Service announced that Wahib would not be prosecuted for child pornography, as it was determined that the images were not intended for sexual arousal.

== Filmography ==
=== Films ===
- 2013: Mimoun, a friend of Ab
- 2014: De verloren zoon, as young delinquent
- 2015: Geen koningen in ons bloed, as Rafael
- 2016: Fissa, as Yous
- 2016: Layla M., as Younes, Layla's brother
- 2016: De Held, as Tarik
- 2017: Monk, as Younes
- 2017: 7 Marokkanen en Jos], as Yessin
- 2017: Broeders (English title Brothers), as Yasin
- 2017: Malik, as Amir
- 2018: Taal is zeg maar echt mijn ding, as an up-and-coming football talent
- 2019: De libi, (English title About That Life as Bilal
- 2020: Paradise Drifters, as Yousef
- 2021: Meskina

=== Television series ===
- 2013: De vloer op jr., in diverse personalities
- 2014: Brugklas (English title The First Years, as Ravi
- 2014: A'dam - E.V.A., as Samih
- 2014: Verborgen verhalen, as Nas
- 2015: Vechtershart, as pizza delivery boy
- 2016: Toon, as Karim
- 2016: Nieuwe buren, as Aziz
- 2016: SpangaS, as Kaleb
- 2018: Flikken Maastricht, als Ahmed
- 2018-2021: Mocro Maffia, as Mo de Show
- 2019: Remy en Juliyat (a modern adaptation of Romeo and Juliet), as Hamza
- 2020: Commando's, as Aza Ouazani
- 2021: Red Light, as Elarbi

== Discography ==
=== Albums ===
Title	Album details	Peak chart positions
Title	Album details	NLD
El Mehdi	Released: 26 November 2021; Label: TopNotch; Formats: CD, digital download	6

=== Singles ===
List of singles, with selected chart positions, showing year released and album name
Title	Year	Peak chart positions		Certification	Album
Title	Year	NL Dutch Top 40	NL Dutch Single Top 100	Certification	Album
"Vliegen"	2019	—	71		Non-album single
"Video Vixen" (with Bizzey)	2020	41	5	NVPI: Gold	El Mehdi
"Doorheen" (with Bizzey, Ronnie Flex & Ramiks)	2020	—	15		Non-album single
"Tigers"	2020	3	1	NVPI: Platinum	El Mehdi
"Vergeten" (with Boef)	2020	—	2		Non-album single
"Jaloers"	2020	41	34		El Mehdi
"501" (with Ronnie Flex)	2021	3	1		El Mehdi
"Paranoia"	2021	—	13		El Mehdi
"Ibiza"	2021	18	2		El Mehdi
"Streken van een duivel" (featuring Frenna)	2021	22	2		El Mehdi
"Mañana" (with Rolf Sanchez)	2022	—	38		Non-album singles
"1234" (with Cristian D and Lassa)	2022	—	8		Non-album singles
"Ik Space" (featuring Fabienne Bergmans)	2023	—	4		Non-album singles
"Outside" (with Zoë Tauran)	2023	—	33		Non-album singles
"Simone"	2023	—	74		Non-album singles
"Opfok"	2023	—	— (Note: "Opfok" did not enter the Dutch Single Top 100, but peaked at number 13 on the Single Tip chart.)		Non-album singles
"Birkin" (with Katnuf)	2023	—	94		Non-album singles
"Verpest" (featuring Zoë Tauran)	2024	—	54		Non-album singles
"Overdosis"	2025	14	7		Non-album singles
"In je bed" (with Trobi and Luna)	2026	—	79		Non-album singles

=== Songs featured in ===
List of singles, with selected chart positions, showing year released and album name
Title	Year	Peak chart positions		Album
Title	Year	NL Dutch Top 40	NL Dutch Single Top 100	Album
"Donderdag" (Kris Kross Amsterdam featuring Bilal Wahib and Emma Heesters)	2020	29	37	
"Solo" (Zoe Tauran featuring Bilal Wahib)	2022	26	—	

=== Other charted songs ===
List of songs, with selected chart positions, showing year released and album name
Title	Year	Peak chart positions	Album
Title	Year	NL Dutch Single Top 100	Album
"1%" (featuring Kraantje Pappie)	2021	52	El Mehdi
