= Jasper Wolf =

Dutch cinematographer

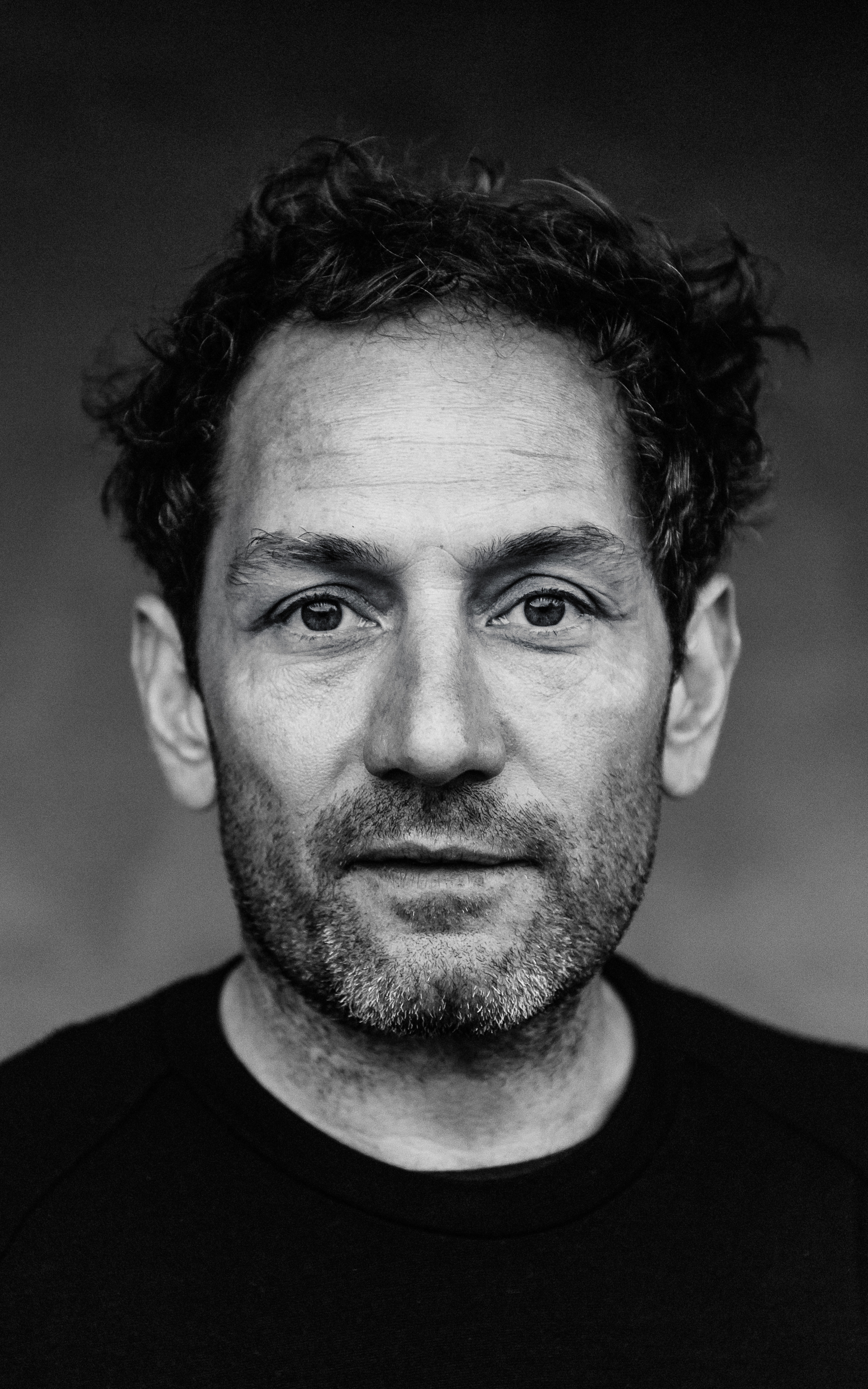
- Born: Amsterdam, Netherlands
- Occupation: Cinematographer
- Years active: 1999–present

Jasper Wolf, NSC, is a Dutch cinematographer. He is best known for his work on Monos, Instinct, Paradise Drifters, and Code Blue.

== Career ==
Jasper was born in Amsterdam, The Netherlands. He is a member of the Netherlands Society of Cinematographers (NSC). He was invited to become a member of Academy of Motion Picture Arts and Sciences in 2020.

== Selected filmography ==
- 2026 – A Family
- 2024 – Babygirl
- 2022 – Bodies Bodies Bodies
- 2021 – Dead & Beautiful
- 2020 – Paradise Drifters
- 2019 – Instinct
- 2019 – Monos
- 2018 – Open Seas

- 2017 – Brothers
- 2015 – Boy 7
- 2014 – Reckless
- 2014 – Atlantic.
- 2011-2013 – Van God los
- 2011 – Code Blue

== Awards and nominations ==
Year	Result	Award	Category	Work	Ref.
2021	Won	Macondo Awards	Best Cinematography	Monos	
2021	Nominated	Taipei Film Festival	Best Cinematography	Dead & Beautiful	
2020	Won	Platino Awards	Best Cinematography	Monos	
2020	Nominated	American Society of Cinematographers	Spotlight Award	Monos	
2020	Nominated	London Film Critics' Circle	Technical Achievement of the Year	Monos	
2020	Nominated	Netherlands Film Festival	Golden Calf for Best Photography	Paradise Drifters	
2019	Won	Netherlands Film Festival	Golden Calf for Best Photography	Open Seas	
2019	Won	Newport Beach Film Festival	Best Cinematography	Monos	
2019	Nominated	Argentine Academy of Cinematography Arts and Sciences	Best Cinematography	Monos	
2019	Nominated	Dublin Film Critics' Circle	Best Cinematography	Monos	
2015	Nominated	Netherlands Film Festival	Golden Calf for Best Photography	Atlantic.	
2011	Won	Netherlands Film Festival	Golden Calf for Best Photography	Code Blue	
2009	Nominated	Camerimage	Main Competition	Het leven uit een dag	
