= Darren Newton =

English actor, writer and director

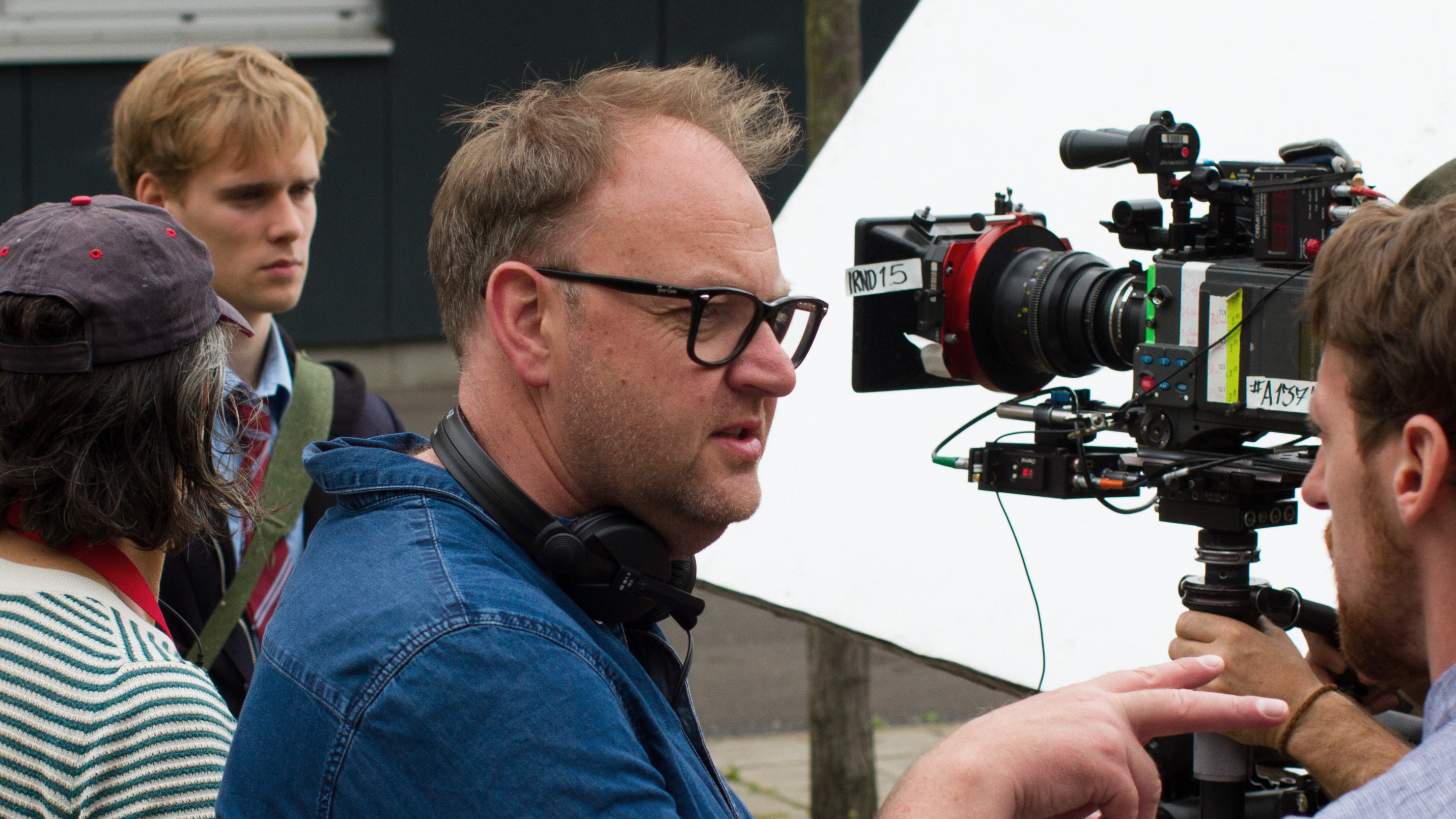
On set directing the feature film 2:Hrs

Darren Newton (born 16 May 1969 in Ashington, Northumberland, England) is an English actor, writer and director.

Trained at Royal Scottish Academy of Music and Drama, Glasgow, he appeared as Gavin Hindle in Eldorado and subsequently in several Catherine Cookson films, before moving into theatre directing. He has an MA in Scriptwriting from Sussex University.

Newton writes and directs using the name D. James Newton; his debut feature film 2:Hrs, by Roland Moore, was released in 2017.

== Filmography ==
- The Glass Virgin (1995) – Willy Fairburn
- The Cinder Path (1994)
- Eldorado (1992) – Gavin Hindle
- Women in Tropical Places (1989)
- Stormy Monday (1988)

=== Director ===
- 2:Hrs (2018)
