= The Forgotten Battle =

Dutch film (2020)

- Promotional release poster
- Dutch: De Slag om de Schelde
- Directed by: Matthijs van Heijningen Jr.
- Screenplay by: Paula van der Oest
- Story by: Paula van der Oest; Jesse Maiman
- Produced by: Alain de Levita; Paula van der Oest; Mark van Eeuwen
- Starring: Gijs Blom; Jamie Flatters; Susan Radder; Theo Barklem-Biggs; Scott Reid; Robert Naylor; Tom Felton
- Cinematography: Lennert Hillege
- Edited by: Marc Bechtold
- Music by: Emilie Levienaise-Farrouch
- Production companies: Levitate Film; Caviar
- Distributed by: September Films
- Release dates: December 14, 2020 (Vlissingen); June 5, 2021 (Netherlands); October 15, 2021 (Netflix)
- Running time: 123 minutes
- Country: Netherlands
- Languages: Dutch; English; German
- Budget: €14 million
- Box office: $6 million

The Forgotten Battle (Dutch: De Slag om de Schelde) is a 2020 Dutch war drama film directed by Matthijs van Heijningen Jr. that depicts the Battle of the Scheldt in 1944. The film follows a Dutch Axis soldier played by Gijs Blom, a British glider pilot played by Jamie Flatters, and a resistance woman from Zeeland played by Susan Radder.

== Plot ==
In September 1944, Teuntje Visser works in the office of a collaborationist mayor in German-occupied Zeeland as the Allies approach from Belgium. While she and her father, a doctor, choose to be neutral, her younger brother Dirk is a member of the Dutch Resistance who is arrested for throwing a rock at a German convoy and betrays the names of other Resistance members under torture.

Marinus van Staveren, a Dutch volunteer in the Waffen-SS Division Das Reich, is reassigned from the Eastern Front to serve as secretary and translator for the German commandant in Zeeland, Oberst Berghof. Marinus grows increasingly disillusioned with the Nazis' heavy-handed occupation including the execution of civilian hostages. He sympathises with Teuntje and her father as they attempt to negotiate a lighter sentence for Dirk in Berghof's office. Despite assurances that Dirk will be treated leniently, Berghof ultimately orders Dirk's execution with the other Resistance members. Marinus tries to secretly inform Teuntje but they are spotted by a passing officer, who reports him to Berghof. As punishment, he is assigned to the firing squad for Dirk's execution, then returned to combat duty.

Dirk's death draws Teuntje into the Resistance and she learns Dirk had covertly photographed German positions along the Scheldt estuary. Teuntje steals a tidal map of the Sloe Channel from the mayor's office showing a section of channel deep enough for Allied forces to cross by boat. She is tasked, with her best friend Janna, to smuggle the map and photographs to the Allied forces advancing toward Walcheren island.

Glider Pilot Regiment Sergeant Will Sinclair, Lieutenant Tony Turner, and Free Dutch Forces soldier Henk Sneijder crash-land in a flooded estuary in Zeeland after their Airspeed Horsa glider is hit by anti-aircraft fire during Operation Market Garden. Turner is wounded during the crash-landing. After wading through the marshes, they shelter at a farmhouse whose owner informs them that Operation Market Garden has failed and that the Canadian Army has entered the Netherlands. Setting out for the Canadian lines through flooded terrain, they take shelter but are abandoned the next day by the other members of their unit. During an attack by German soldiers, Turner is killed. Henk, exhausted and unable to swim, is left behind by Sinclair, who reaches the Allied line and joins Canadian forces advancing on Walcheren.

Prior to the Battle of Walcheren Causeway, Teuntje is captured but Janna escapes and delivers the map to Allied soldiers before dying of a gunshot wound. Marinus joins the German defense of Walcheren Island while Sinclair participates in a costly frontal assault by Allied soldiers. A second attack, planned with the map Janna provided, goes in across the water and strikes the German defences from the flank. Sinclair and Marinus encounter each other in the fighting, briefly hold each other at gunpoint, then let each other go.

As the Germans retreat, Marinus kills a German soldier assaulting Teuntje but is shot during the struggle. A grateful Teuntje tends to him, but Marinus dies of his injuries. Sinclair and other Allied soldiers find Marinus' body next to Teuntje, who walks away as the town is liberated.

An epilogue mentions that the Allied victory at Walcheren enabled the reopening of the port of Antwerp to Allied forces and helped contribute to the Liberation of the Netherlands on 5 May 1945.

== Cast ==
- Gijs Blom as Marinus van Staveren
- Jamie Flatters as William Sinclair
- Susan Radder as Teuntje Visser
- Jan Bijvoet as Doctor Visser
- Tom Felton as Lieutenant Tony Turner
- Coen Bril as Henk Schneijder
- Theo Barklem-Biggs as John
- Scott Reid as Nigel
- Marthe Schneider as Janna
- Ronald Kalter as Dirk Visser
- Justus von Dohnányi as Oberst Berghof
- Mark van Eeuwen as Pim den Oever
- Richard Dillane as Group Captain Sinclair
- Gordon Morris as Sergeant Mackay
- Robert Naylor as Bill
- Ariane Van Vliet as Mother Marinus

== Production ==
=== Development ===
Matthijs van Heijningen, Jr. directed the film. Alain de Levita, Paula van der Oest, and Mark van Eeuwen served as producers. EO, NPO, Belgian company Caviar joined the project as co-producers. The film received funding from CoBo, Netherlands Film Fund, Flemish Audiovisual Fund, and the Belgian Tax Shelter. It was announced in November 2019 that Netflix would also co-produce, making The Forgotten Battle the company's first Dutch film.

=== Filming ===
With a budget of around €14 million, it is the second most expensive Dutch film made after Black Book (Dutch: Zwartboek) in 2006. It was shot primarily in Dutch and English with some German. Principal photography began in Lithuania where a large part of the movie was filmed and continued in the Netherlands and in Belgium. Locations in the Netherlands included Middelburg, Zeeland and the port city of Vlissingen. Some parts of the battle were filmed in and near Limburg, Belgium and in the Sint-Truiden area.

== Release ==
The first trailer was released in November 2020. The film had a premiere in Vlissingen on 14 December 2020. It was originally scheduled for a theatrical release in the Netherlands a few days later, but it was postponed to 5 June 2021 as a result of the COVID-19 pandemic. EO broadcast the film on 24 December 2021 and it was streaming on Netflix as of 15 October 2021. The movie ranked in Netflix's all-time top 10 non-English language movies with 60.93 million hours watched in the first 28 days on the platform.

The film finished in third place in the list of most successful films in the Netherlands in 2021 with just over 507,000 tickets sold. It was the highest Dutch film on the list, with No Time to Die and Fast & Furious 9 in first and second place respectively. The film won the Platinum Film award for box office success.

== Reception ==
Rotten Tomatoes reported an approval rating of 100% based on 8 reviews.

Arnav Srivastav of High on Films wrote "Do not skip this one! [...]The Forgotten Battle is a tightly wound war film that works"; adding the film covers a World War II conflict "that did not make it to the mainstream conversation". Johnny Loftus of Decider recommended the film, saying "The Forgotten Battle approaches the scope of a war epic in look and feel while keeping its focus on the disparate trio of individuals at its core, fated to meet in war."

In the autumn of 2021, The Forgotten Battle was nominated for a Golden Calf in nine different categories. The film ultimately managed to win five of the nine nominations, in the categories of Best Cinematography, Best Sound Design, Best Production Design, Best Costume Design, and Best Editing.
