= Bracken Moor =

2013 play by Alexi Kaye Campbell

Bracken Moor is a 2013 play by the British playwright Alexi Kaye Campbell. It premiered at the Tricycle Theatre in London (in a co-production with Shared Experience directed by Polly Teale) from 6 June 2013 to 20 July 2013.

== Plot ==
=== Act 1 ===
Harold, a coal magnate in 1930s Yorkshire, discusses the closure of one of his pits with his foreman John Bailey, including the loss of 140 jobs that will result. Bailey tries to outline a plan to save the jobs but Harold rejects this out of hand. He then has an argument with Terence Avery over politics - Terence has just arrived with his parents Vanessa and Geoffrey, family friends of Harold and his wife Elizabeth.

The Averys have not seen Harold and Elizabeth for ten years, last seeing them just before Harold and Elizabeth's son fell down a disused mine shaft at Bracken Moor and died a slow and agonising death. Elizabeth is still deep in mourning and reacts badly to Vanessa's suggestion that she return to London society. Terence is more sympathetic to her grief and a strong emotional bond is formed between him and the grieving Elizabeth. Early one morning soon after their arrival, Terence awakes after a nightmare and in the presence of the four other adults has a seizure where he seems to speak in the voice of Harold and Elizabeth's dead son Edgar, relaying information that only the boy and his parents could have known and suggesting they return to the place of his death.

=== Act 2 ===
After visiting Bracken Moor, the four adults bring in the sleeping Terence and argue over his behaviour there - whilst in the mine he was still again apparently possessed by the dead son's spirit whilst in the mine and reenacted his last moments there. Elizabeth and Harold are left alone with Terence, who again speaks in the son's voice. The Averys decide to leave soon afterwards and before leaving Terence meets Harold alone - he admits that he had found the son's private diary and, using this, had fabricated the possession in order to alleviate Elizabeth's grief and help Harold admit to his grief. He also leaves the diary with Harold.

Elizabeth admits that she needs to leave the family home, moving to her sister's house, since her life with Harold has become oppressive. She does not react badly to finding out that the possession was fabricated and instead praises Terence's motives. Harold meets again with his foreman but, despite Terence's advice to the contrary, goes ahead with the pit closure. He then settles down to read the diary and a moment later sees the ghost of his dead son.

== Premiere cast ==
- John Bailey / Dr Gibbons - Antony Byrne
- Harold - Daniel Flynn
- Eileen, Elizabeth's maidservant - Natalie Gavin
- Elizabeth, Harold's wife - Helen Schlesinger
- Geoffrey Avery - Simon Shepherd
- Terence Avery - Joseph Timms
- Vanessa Avery - Sarah Woodward
- Edgar - Jamie Flatters/Bili Keogh
