= Vera Bulder =

Dutch actress

- Born: Amsterdam, Netherlands
- Occupations: Actress, model, producer
- Spouse: Jake Weary (m. 2019)
- Children: 1

Vera Bulder is a Dutch actress and model.

== Early life ==
Bulder was born to a theatre family in Amsterdam, and attended acting school in Rotterdam. She moved to New York during a gap year from high school at the age of 17.

== Career ==
Bulder performed in two plays at the International Theater Amsterdam prior to attending acting school in Rotterdam. Prior to moving to New York, Bulder appeared in Dutch films. She has since appeared in indie films. She is signed with No Agency New York.

Bulder and English actress Clara McGregor launched Deux Dames Entertainment, a production company that develops female-driven stories. In March 2021, it was announced that Deux Dames Entertainment and indie production company Black Magic would be producing a limited series adaptation of Goddess, a novel by Kelly Gardiner about 17th-century opera singer Julie d'Aubigny.

Bulder wrote, produced and appeared in the 2023 film Bleeding Love. The film's cast included Clara and Ewan McGregor, as well as Bulder's husband Jake Weary.

In April 2024, it was announced that Bulder would appear alongside Clara McGregor and Weary in The Philosophy of Dress, a satire film directed by Cyrus Duff.

== Personal life ==
Bulder owns a pet corn snake that she bought at Petco in 2017. She is married to American actor Jake Weary; they have one child.

== Filmography ==
Key
| † | Denotes productions that have not yet been released |

=== Film ===
| Year | Title | Role | Notes |
|---|---|---|---|
| 2019 | About That Life | Liv | |
| 2023 | Bleeding Love | Tommy | Also producer and writer |
| TBA | The Philosophy of Dress † | TBA | |
