= 2:Hrs =

- Film poster
- Directed by: Darren Newton
- Written by: Roland Moore
- Produced by: Andromeda Godfrey; Diana Juhr-De Benedetti; Darren Newton
- Starring: Harry Jarvis; Ella-Rae Smith; Alhaji Fofana
- Cinematography: Sara Deane
- Edited by: Jim Page
- Music by: Matthew Bonham; Tim Cotterell
- Production companies: Makelight Productions; Sting Like a Bee Films
- Distributed by: The Movie Partnership
- Release date: 30 July 2018
- Running time: 85 minutes
- Country: United Kingdom
- Language: English

2:Hrs is a 2018 British comedy film directed by Darren Newton, starring Harry Jarvis, Ella-Rae Smith and Alhaji Fofana.

== Cast ==
- Harry Jarvis as Tim Edge
- Ella-Rae Smith as Victoria
- Alhaji Fofana as Alf
- Keith Allen as Lewis Groad
- Siobhan Redmond as Lena Eidelhorn
- Seann Walsh as Tooley
- Marek Larwood as Graves
- Kirsty Dillon as Ellie Edge
- Fabienne Piolini-Castle as Shona Edge
- Tomi May as Anatoli
- Zara Symes as Miss Forrest
- Lelia Yvetta as Georgia Miston
- Andromeda Godfrey as Rachel Halliday
- Bruce Herbelin-Earle as Harry
- Flynn Matthews as Graham

== Reception ==
Darryl M. of Dove.org called the film "enjoyable, if slightly corny".

Renee Longstreet of Common Sense Media rated the film 3 stars out of 5 and wrote that the film's "outlandish" concept is "made plausible" by the "sincere" performances of Jarvis, Smith and Fofana.

Film critic Kim Newman called the film the "nearest thing we’re going to get to a Children's Film Foundation movie this century".
