= Dead & Beautiful =

2021 Dutch film

- Directed by: David Verbeek
- Written by: David Verbeek; Hugh Travers
- Produced by: Erik Glijnis; Leontine Petit
- Starring: Gijs Blom; Aviis Zhong
- Cinematography: Jasper Wolf
- Edited by: Axel Skovdal Roelofs
- Music by: Rutger Reijnders
- Production company: Lemming Film
- Distributed by: Periscoop Film (Netherlands)
- Release date: 2 February 2021
- Running time: 98 minutes
- Countries: Netherlands; Taiwan
- Languages: English; Mandarin Chinese

Dead & Beautiful is a 2021 drama film directed by David Verbeek. An international co-production of the Netherlands and Taiwan, the film premiered on the International Film Festival Rotterdam. It also played at the Imagine Film Festival and the Netherlands Film Festival.

== Plot ==
A group of young and spoiled rich kids turn into vampires after a night out, changing the course of their lives and driving a wedge between them all.

== Cast ==
- Gijs Blom as Mason
- Philip Juan as Bin-Ray
- Anna Marchenko as Anastasia
- Yen Tsao as Alexander
- Aviis Zhong as Lulu
