= Bleeding Love (film) =

2023 film by Emma Westenberg

- Theatrical release poster
- Directed by: Emma Westenberg
- Screenplay by: Ruby Caster
- Story by: Ruby Caster; Clara McGregor; Vera Bulder
- Produced by: Mark Amin; Christine Vachon; Clara McGregor; Vera Bulder; Greg Lauritano; Mason Plotts; Cami Winikoff
- Starring: Clara McGregor; Ewan McGregor; Kim Zimmer; Jake Weary; Devyn McDowell; Vera Bulder
- Cinematography: Christopher Ripley
- Edited by: Autumn Dea
- Music by: Raven Aartsen
- Production companies: Sobini Films; Killer Films; Deux Dames Entertainment; Black Magic
- Distributed by: Vertical Entertainment
- Release dates: March 11, 2023 (SXSW); February 16, 2024 (United States)
- Running time: 102 minutes
- Country: United States
- Language: English

Bleeding Love is a 2023 American drama film starring real life father and daughter Ewan McGregor and Clara McGregor. Directed by Emma Westenberg in her feature length debut, it was written by Ruby Caster from an original story by Caster, Clara McGregor and Vera Bulder. It had its world premiere at South by Southwest on March 11, 2023 under the title You Sing Loud, I Sing Louder, and was released by Vertical Entertainment on February 16, 2024.

== Premise ==
A father secretly drives his estranged daughter to rehab after she overdoses, aware that she has inherited his addiction problems, and after he has started a new family elsewhere.

== Cast ==
- Clara McGregor as Daughter
- Ewan McGregor as Father
- Kim Zimmer as Elsie
- Jake Weary as Kip
- Vera Bulder as Tommy
- Devyn McDowell as Young Daughter

== Production ==
Christine Vachon produced the film. Clara McGregor produced, as well as wrote the story alongside Ruby Caster and Vera Bulder. The idea for the story drew on aspects of the McGregors' own father-daughter relationship, Ewan McGregor told Deadline Hollywood that the film "can be very meta and still definitely be a work of fiction and not at all biographical... I don't suggest this is autobiographical, but there we were, playing father and daughter and we are that. You can't help but have that be in the room".

Principal photography took place in late 2021 lasting 22 days in New Mexico.

== Release ==
Under its original title You Sing Loud, I Sing Louder, the film had its premiere at 2023 South by Southwest Film & TV Festival in Austin, Texas on March 11, 2023. In December 2023, Vertical Entertainment acquired distribution rights to the film, now retitled Bleeding Love, and scheduled it for a theatrical release in the United States on February 16, 2024. It was released in the United Kingdom by Icon Film Distribution on March 29, 2024.

== Reception ==
On the review aggregator website Rotten Tomatoes, 57% of 49 critics' reviews are positive, with an average rating of 5.5/10. The website's consensus reads: "Bleeding Love benefits from strong interplay between Ewan and Clara McGregor, although their efforts are somewhat undermined by a less than scintillating script." Metacritic, which uses a weighted average, assigned the film a score of 40 out of 100, based on 10 critics, indicating "mixed or average" reviews.

The Observer's Wendy Ide gave it 2/5 stars, writing, "Decent performances from both McGregors can't breathe much spirit (alcoholic or otherwise) into the film's listless and generic screenplay." Kevin Maher of The Times also gave it 2/5 stars, writing, "The relationship dynamics may be inspired by real experiences but they play out on screen as false. There's no dramatic tension, our protagonists whine a lot and they seem, at best, like two solipsistic twits driving around the desert and moaning about parenting."

Tim Grierson of Screen Daily said the McGregors "bring a weathered authenticity to this story", adding, "Director Emma Westenberg has crafted a gentle character study flecked with sorrow and regret but, despite the picture's quietly moving moments, the conventionality of proceedings ultimately overwhelms the script's modest insights."
