= Ella-Rae Smith =

English actress and model (born 1998)

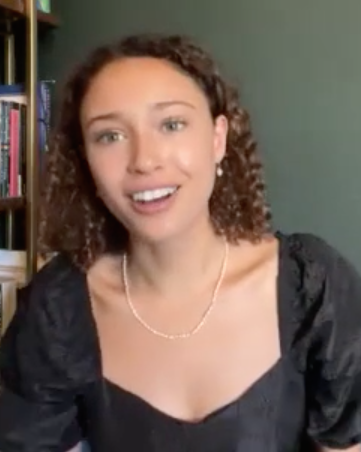
- Smith in 2022
- Born: Ella Rae Kirby-Smith; 21 February 1998 (age 28); Bristol, England
- Occupations: Actress; model
- Years active: 2006–present

Ella-Rae Kirby-Smith (born 21 February 1998) is an English actress and model. She began her modeling career in 2014 and rose to fame for her portrayal of Phoebe in Clique and Nix in the AMC martial arts drama series Into the Badlands.

== Early life ==
Ella-Rae Smith is from Bristol and has two younger siblings. She’s of mixed Jamaican and English heritage. She attended Oldfield School in Bath and went on to Sixth Form at Cotham School. She was scouted at the age of 13 to become a model during a school trip to Paris and signed her first contract in 2014. She attended NYT in 2015.

== Career ==
She got her first big break when she starred in the BBC’s television series, Clique as Phoebe. She has starred in numerous short films in the past two years. In 2017, she was cast to play the role of Nix in Into the Badlands. She played one of Madame M's crew-members in the film Hobbs & Shaw. She also plays the role of Daisy Hoy in the Netflix series The Stranger. She is represented by United Agents.

== Filmography ==
Key
†	Denotes works that have not yet been released

=== Film ===
Year	Title	Role	Notes
2017	Butterfly Kisses	Ella	
2018	The Academy	Optica	Short Film
2018	Dead Birds	Jennifer	Short Film
2018	Boogie Man	Kristen	
2018	2:Hrs	Vic	
2018	Heart's Ease	Polly	Short Film
2018	The Commuter	Sofia	
2019	Hobbs & Shaw	Madame M Crew	
2020	The Existential Hotline	Simone	Short Film
2021	Sweetheart	Isla	
2021	Seance	Helina	
2022	The Lost Girls	Berry	
2022	Into The Deep	Jess	Sky Cinema
2024	My Bloody Galentine	Jadyn	
2025	Your Host	Anita	

=== Television ===
Year	Title	Role	Notes
2016	Marley's Ghosts	Mia	2 episodes
2017–2018	Clique	Phoebe Parker-Fox	Supporting role, (series 1); Guest role (series 2)
2018–2019	Into the Badlands	Nix	Main role
2019	The Witcher	Fola	1 episode
2020	The Stranger	Daisy	8 episodes
2023	Foundation	Queen Sareth	Season 2
2024	One Day	Naomi	1 episode
2026	Agatha Christie's Seven Dials	Loraine Wade	Miniseries
