= Your Host (film) =

- Directed by: DW Medoff
- Written by: Joey Miller
- Starring: Jackie Earle Haley; Ella-Rae Smith; Jamie Flatters; David Angland; Joelle Rae
- Release date: August 22, 2025 (FrightFest)
- Running time: 89 minutes
- Country: United States
- Language: English

Your Host (formerly titled I’m Your Host) is a 2025 American horror film written by Joey Miller, directed by DW Medoff and starring Jackie Earle Haley, Ella-Rae Smith, Jamie Flatters, David Angland and Joelle Rae.

== Plot ==
A young man wakes up covered in blood with chains around his arms and neck. A VHS camera is recording him, and the host congratulates him on winning the games. The host explains that there are three boxes and that he must select a box to choose his prize for winning the game. Jake selects the middle box, and it is revealed to contain a shotgun. The host discharges the firearm, killing the young man.

Four friends, Anita, James, Matthew, and Melissa, arrive at James's uncle's cabin for a fun weekend. That night, the group find a video camera set up in the yard, and half of the group wants to watch the tapes while the other half is wary. While drunk, Anita admits that they are only friends with James because his parents are rich, causing James to lash out in anger about Anita's dying mother. When Matthew tries to comfort Anita in her bed, he cannot seem to wake her up. He quickly realizes that Melissa is also unresponsive, and as he tries to run, he is injected with a needle that causes him to pass out.

The group wakes up in an underground facility, restrained by metal collars around their necks. An eccentric masked man gleefully reveals himself to be the host of the show and frequently gestures towards a fake audience of strangely dressed mannequins. He makes the group participate in many sadistic games, such as rock, paper, scissors which involves Matthew being bludgeoned by a rock, James's finger being cut off by scissors, and Melissa's mouth being cut open by paper. In another game, the host makes everyone reveal the worst thing that they ever did. Matthew had scammed an elderly couple out of all they own, Melissa sold violent pitbulls to a dog-fighting ring, James let his father take the blame for a fatal car crash that killed a woman, and Anita claims that she sold pornographic content of herself to help pay for her mother's surgery.

Melissa is the loser of the next game, resulting in the host crushing her head with a hydraulic press, killing her. After taking the body away, the host plays a videotape of him brutally murdering a young woman with a chainsaw. He then takes off his mask and reveals himself to Anita, causing her to cower in fear and apologize.

A flashback reveals that the host, named Barry Miller, was a successful TV show host who had employed Anita. During a lunch break, Anita's colleagues Jake (from the beginning scene) and Rebecca (from the videptape Barry had shown the group) discuss the financial benefits of falsely accusing sexual assault in order to get a legal payout after watching the news of another talk show host, Collin Piper, being found innocent after his victims recounted their claims. Barry surprises the group with a birthday cake for Anita, congratulating her on her hard work and patting his hands on her shoulders. Rebecca tells Barry off, saying that it was extremely inappropriate for him to touch her. Rebecca and Jake convince Anita to accuse Barry of sexual assault, which is revealed to be the true method of how Anita paid for her mother's surgery.

Back in the present, James begs Barry to let them leave, promising that James's father can help get Barry's life back. Barry taunts and dismisses him him and shows Anita the severed head of her lawyer who had helped convict Barry. While Barry forces Anita to eat the lawyer's tongue, James tries to kill Barry, but Barry electrically shocks the entire group, causing them to lose consciousness.

When they wake up, James and Matthew are strapped to tables. It is revealed that keys have been sewn into their stomachs which open a door that will let the group out. James promises to give Anita and her mother all the money that they need if she chooses Matthew instead of him, but Anita still chooses to get the key from James. Unfortunately, the key in James's stomach does not open the door. Barry unlocks Matthew's chains for a fight to the death with Anita, but Matthew professes his love for Anita and slits his own throat.

When Anita wakes again, the bodies have been removed, and the door to Barry's makeshift dressing room is opened. Anita finds pictures and VHS tapes of Barry's previous victims. Barry has Anita sit down in front of three presents, replicating the same game as the opening scene with Jake. In a heart to heart, Anita and Barry seem to reconcile, giving Anita hope, but Barry then reveals that she will die anyway but that he promises that if she plays the final game, he won't go after her mother. She selects the center string, revealing a birthday cake. As Barry starts to sing "Happy Birthday to You," she attacks him and escapes outside. He electrically shocks her and brings her back inside to "celebrate" her party. He forces her face into the cake which does not initially do anything, but the frosting is eventually revealed to be acidic as it burns her face and eyes, blinding and killing her.

The final scene is a VHS tape of Barry forcing the talk show host, Collin Piper, to admit his crimes before brutally murdering him in the name of justice.

== Cast ==
- Ella-Rae Smith as Anita
- Jamie Flatters as James
- David Angland as Matthew
- Joelle Rae as Melissa
- Jackie Earle Haley as Barry Miller
- Eve Austin as Rebecca
- Tom Claxton as Jake
- Gerald Lepkowski as Colin Piper
- Seth Michaels as Eric Lace

== Production ==
In October 2024, it was announced that Smith, Flatters, Angland and Rae were cast in the film and that filming was underway in Rome. Later that same month, it was announced that Jackie Earle Haley was cast in the film.

== Release ==
The film premiered at FrightFest on August 22, 2025. Then it was released on VOD on October 14, 2025.

== Reception ==
The film has a 71% rating on Rotten Tomatoes based on 14 reviews. Mikal CG of Film Threat rated the film a 7.5 out of 10. Anton Bitel of SciFiNow awarded the film four stars out of five. Joel Harley of Starburst awarded the film three stars out of five.
