= Monos (film) =

2019 film directed by Alejandro Landes

- Theatrical release poster
- Directed by: Alejandro Landes
- Written by: Alejandro Landes; Alexis Dos Santos
- Produced by: Alejandro Landes; Fernando Epstein; Santiago Zapata; Cristina Landes
- Starring: Julianne Nicholson; Moisés Arias
- Cinematography: Jasper Wolf
- Edited by: Yorgos Mavropsaridis; Ted Guard; Santiago
- Music by: Mica Levi
- Production company: Stela Cine
- Distributed by: Cine Colombia (Colombia); Santa Cine (Argentina); Gusto Entertainment (Netherlands); DCM Film Distribution (Germany); Neon (United States); trigon-film (Switzerland); Angel Films (Denmark)
- Release dates: January 27, 2019 (Sundance); August 15, 2019 (Colombia); September 13, 2019 (United States)
- Running time: 103 minutes
- Countries: Colombia; Argentina; Netherlands; Germany; Sweden; Uruguay; United States; Switzerland; Denmark
- Language: Spanish
- Budget: $2 million
- Box office: $2 million

Monos is a 2019 internationally co-produced war drama film directed by Alejandro Landes, written by Landes and Alexis Dos Santos and produced by Fernando Epstein, Santiago Zapata, Cristina Landes and Landes himself. It stars Julianne Nicholson and Moisés Arias. The film follows a group of teenage soldiers assigned to watch over a hostage. This film was released in the United States on September 13, 2019, by Neon and Participant, receiving positive reviews from critics.

The film had its world premiere at the 2019 Sundance Film Festival on 26 January 2019, where it won the World Cinema Dramatic Special Jury Award. It was selected as the official Colombian entry for the Best International Feature Film at the 92nd Academy Awards and the Goya Award for Best Iberoamerican Film at the 34th Goya Awards.

== Plot ==
On a remote mountaintop, the Monos, a group of teenage commandos identified only by their noms de guerre, perform military training exercises while watching over a prisoner of war referred to only as "Doctora". They are visited by the Messenger, a superior in the unnamed Organization they serve, who oversees their drills and instructs them to push themselves harder. Two of the Monos, Lady and Wolf, request permission to enter a romantic relationship, which the Messenger grants. Before departing, he leaves the Monos in charge of a milk cow named Shakira.

Lady and Wolf consummate their relationship, an event the other commandos honor with celebratory gunfire, during which Shakira is inadvertently shot and killed by Dog. The Monos punish Dog by putting him in solitary confinement in a pit and then drag Shakira's body to their camp to strip it for meat. Troop leader Wolf commits suicide. The Monos argue over how to report this to the Messenger via radio; they eventually lie to protect Dog, saying that Wolf killed Shakira and killed himself out of shame. Lady and Rambo have a sexual encounter that night by the fire. With Wolf dead, the Messenger appoints Bigfoot as head of the squad. Over the radio, the Organization's commander asks Doctora questions from her family to confirm that she is alive.

The Monos' base is attacked and Doctora is put under the watch of Swede, who informs her that she will be killed if the opposing forces try to rescue her. While they are alone together, Doctora appeals to Swede's emotions to help her escape and the two embrace when the bunker in which they are hiding is shelled. Swede begins kissing Doctora, who throws her off; Swede then returns to holding her at gunpoint, laughing while crying.

The following day, Bigfoot announces that the Monos were triumphant in the fight and will be relocating to the jungle. Soon after their arrival, Doctora makes an attempt to escape. Bigfoot is enraged, damaging the radio and declaring the Monos independent of the Organization. After Doctora is recaptured, Bigfoot demands that Rambo chain her to a tree. Rambo does so, but begins to cry, further angering Bigfoot.

The Messenger returns to check on the Monos and discovers that Lady and Bigfoot have begun a sexual relationship without approval. He forces the Monos to carry out strenuous exercises and confess to him about one another's misdeeds. Smurf reveals that Dog is the one who killed Shakira, and recounts what Bigfoot said about the Monos' independence. The Messenger announces that he will be taking Bigfoot to be assessed by the Organization's superiors. However, on the motorboat ride there, Bigfoot shoots the Messenger in the back and returns to the jungle camp. Smurf is tied to a tree as punishment for snitching and the Monos double down on their training, robbing several passing motorists.

Rambo tries to free Smurf in the night, but is stopped by Lady. Rambo then runs off alone and attempts to steal a boat, only to be caught by its owner, who is diving for gold in the river. He takes Rambo back to his home, where Rambo meets the man's family and is given food and a bed.

Swede takes the chained Doctora to swim, and soon joins her in the river. Doctora uses the chain to strangle Swede underwater, then breaks the chain with a rock. She returns to the base, finds Smurf tied up, and takes his boots. Smurf begs Doctora to take him with her, but she leaves him.

The Monos track Rambo down and attack the house, killing the man and his wife. As Rambo flees, a television in the background reports that Doctora has been spotted in the jungle, and it is implied she will soon be rescued by authorities. Lady finds the couple's three children hiding under a table while Bigfoot, Boom Boom, and Dog chase Rambo, who jumps into the river. Eventually, Rambo washes up on shore and is picked up by a military helicopter, whose pilots radio ahead that they have found an unidentified person. As the helicopter arrives in a nearby city, one of the soldiers contacts his commander, repeatedly requesting orders about what to do with the captive as Rambo starts to cry.

== Cast ==
- Julianne Nicholson as "Doctora" Sara Watson
- Moisés Arias as Bigfoot
- Sofía Buenaventura as Rambo
- Julián Giraldo as Wolf
- Karen Quintero as Lady
- Laura Castrillón as Swede
- Deibi Rueda as Smurf
- Paul Cubides as Dog
- Sneider Castro as Boom Boom
- Wilson Salazar as The Messenger
- Jorge Román as The Gold Miner

== Production ==
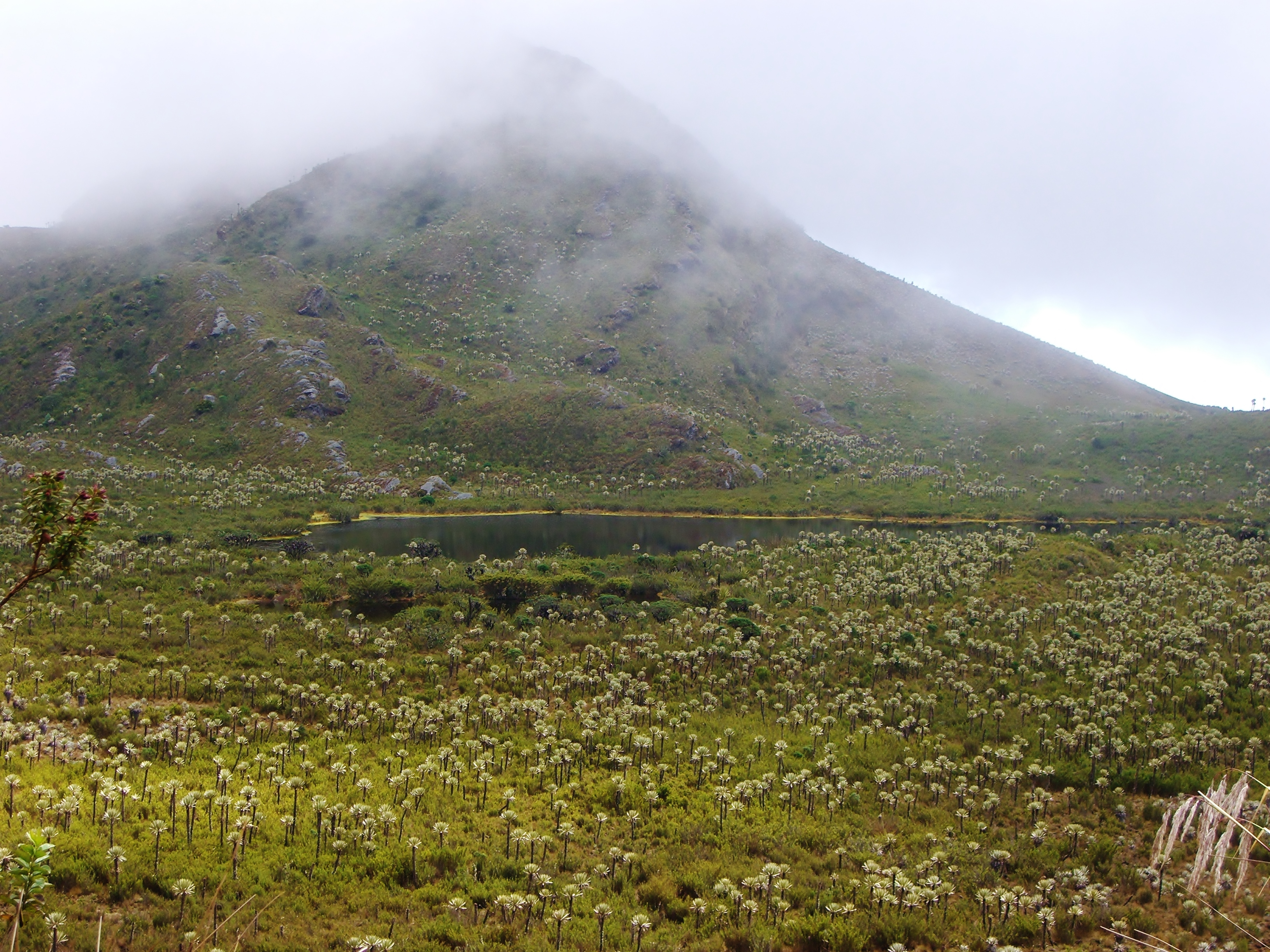
Chingaza National Natural Park, where the first half of the film was shot

The film was loosely inspired by the novels Lord of the Flies by William Golding and Heart of Darkness by Joseph Conrad. Filmic influences included the Soviet film Come and See and the French film Beau Travail. While "monos", the title as well as the code name of the main squad in the film, superficially means "monkeys" in Spanish, it signifies the prefix mono- of Greek origin meaning "alone" or "one" according to Landes. As for the subjects of teenage soldiers and the Colombian conflict, Landes said:

In Monos, youth serves as a metaphor for Colombia as a nation; it's a young country, still searching for its identity, and the dream of peace is fragile, tentative and recurring. ... It's a stage in life in which we are caught between wanting company and, just as desperately, wanting to be alone. Monos looks to evoke this angst and conflict from the inside rather than create reactions of pity or outrage in the audience by depicting what could be perceived as a foreign conflict.

A film atypical in Latin America, Monos ended up being a co-production between eight countries with support from a variety of institutional funds. Describing the financing process, Landes said, "we basically passed around a hat. I think we had about half the budget when we started shooting".

More than 800 children across Colombia were considered for the main roles of child soldiers. First, 20 to 30 were chosen to participate in a weeks-long camp in mountains, where they received acting training from Argentine actress Inés Efron in the morning, and military training from Wilson Salazar, who plays the Messenger, in the afternoon, and the final eight were cast among them. Salazar was a FARC soldier from age 11 to 24, and Landes found him at one of the reinsertion programmes Landes visited for research. Landes first hired Salazar as a consultant before casting him as the Messenger. The role of Rambo, played by Buenaventura, who goes by Matt, was originally written to be a boy, but Landes made the character's gender ambiguous during the casting process. Monos marked the first film appearances of the main actors aside from Arias and Nicholson. Quintero and Castrillón had acting experience in theatre. Buenaventura and Giraldo have continued acting in film since Monos.

The production began in late 2016 and lasted nine weeks. The mountain scenes were shot in Chingaza National Natural Park, four hours outside of Bogotá and more than 4,000 m (13,000 ft) above sea level. The jungle scenes were shot around the Samaná Norte River in Antioquia Department, five hours from Medellín. Because of the conflict, the jungle was considered too dangerous for civilians to visit until recently, hence remaining mostly untouched by humans. For the cast and crew, mules carried food and gear, Colombia's national kayak team helped them find a base camp, and a family of illegal gold miners built military tents. Underwater scenes were shot with buoyancy equipment attached to the actors, with the kayak team helping ensure safety. Prominent underwater cinematographer Peter Zuccarini joined the crew for three to four days. According to cinematographer Jasper Wolf, both locations had never been captured on film before.

=== Music ===
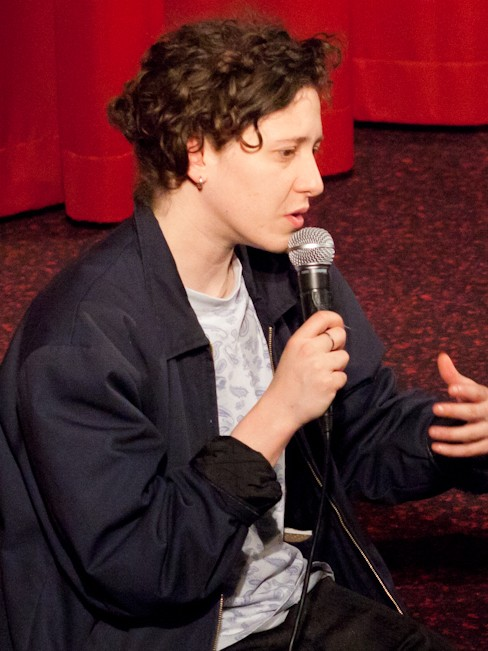
Mica Levi composed the score.

Monos is the fourth film scored by Mica Levi, following Under the Skin, Jackie, and Marjorie Prime. Levi came on board after seeing an unfinished cut. Landes asked Levi for a "monumental, but minimal" score. Levi first made short compositions involving whistles, made by Levi blowing into a glass bottle, timpani, and a synthesizer sound, around which further compositions were built. Different sounds were assigned to represent various characters: a shrill bottle whistle became the "authority whistle", evoking the presence of the Organization; a bird-like whistle represented the bond among the child soldiers; and timpani accompanied with the authority whistle represented "the shadowy force that tries to control the group from a distance". The score is used sparingly throughout the film, taking up only 22 minutes.

== Release ==
In January 2019, Neon acquired the US distribution rights to the film. In March 2019 Participant Media joined as a co-distributor for the US.

== Reception ==
The film holds a 93% approval rating on review aggregator Rotten Tomatoes, based on 149 reviews with an average rating of 8/10. The website's consensus states: "As visually splendid as it is thought-provoking, Monos takes an unsettling look at human nature whose grim sights leave a lingering impact." On Metacritic, the film has a weighted average score of 78 out of 100 based on 27 critics, indicating "generally favorable reviews".

== Accolades ==
Award	Date of ceremony	Category	Recipients	Result	Ref.
Sundance Film Festival	2 February 2019	World Cinema Dramatic Special Jury Award	Monos	Won	
Cartagena Film Festival	11 March 2019	Audience Award	Monos	Won	
Cinélatino Rencontres de Toulouse	30 March 2019	Prix CCAS, Prix Des Électriciens Gaziers	Monos	Won	
Buenos Aires International Festival of Independent Cinema	13 April 2019	Best Original Music	Mica Levi	Won	
Newport Beach Film Festival	8 May 2019	Jury Award – Best Film	Monos	Won	
Newport Beach Film Festival	8 May 2019	Jury Award – Best Actress	Sofía Buenaventura	Won	
Newport Beach Film Festival	8 May 2019	Jury Award – Best Director	Alejandro Landes	Won	
Newport Beach Film Festival	8 May 2019	Jury Award – Best Cinematography	Jasper Wolf	Won	
Montclair Film Festival	12 May 2019	Fiction Feature Prize	Monos	Won	
Transilvania International Film Festival	9 June 2019	Transilvania Trophy	Monos	Won	
Art Film Fest	21 June 2019	Blue Angel – Best Film	Monos	Won	
Odesa International Film Festival	20 July 2019	Best Director	Alejandro Landes	Won	
Santiago International Film Festival	24 August 2019	Best Director	Alejandro Landes	Won	
Viña del Mar International Film Festival	14 September 2019	Gran Paoa Prize - Best International Film	Monos	Won	
Viña del Mar International Film Festival	14 September 2019	Specialized Press Prize	Monos	Won	
Miskolc International Film Festival	20 September 2019	Emeric Pressburger Prize – Best Film	Monos	Won	
Miskolc International Film Festival	20 September 2019	International Confederation of Art Cinemas Jury's Prize	Monos	Won	
San Sebastián International Film Festival	27 September 2019	Sebastiane Award	Monos	Won	
Latino Media Fest	3 October 2019	Best Latin American Film	Monos	Won	
Ourense Film Festival	5 October 2019	Carlos Velo Award – Best Director	Alejandro Landes	Won	
Ourense Film Festival	5 October 2019	Best Performance	Julianne Nicholson	Won	
BFI London Film Festival	12 October 2019	Best Film	Monos	Won	
British Independent Film Awards	1 December 2019	Best International Independent Film	Monos	Nominated	
London Film Critics' Circle Awards	30 January 2020	Foreign Language Film of the Year	Monos	Nominated	
London Film Critics' Circle Awards	30 January 2020	Technical Achievement Award	Jasper Wolf	Nominated	

== See also ==
- List of submissions to the 92nd Academy Awards for Best International Feature Film
- List of Colombian submissions for the Academy Award for Best International Feature Film
