= Paradise Drifters =

2020 Dutch film directed by Mees Peijnenburg

- Directed by: Mees Peijnenburg
- Written by: Mees Peijnenburg
- Produced by: Iris Otten; Sander van Meurs; Pieter Kuijpers
- Starring: Tamar van Waning; Jonas Smulders; Bilal Wahib; Joren Seldeslachts; Camilla Siegertsz; Steef Cuijpers; Micha Hulshof
- Cinematography: Jasper Wolf
- Edited by: Imre Reutelingsperger
- Music by: Juho Nurmela; Ella van der Woude
- Production company: Pupkin Film
- Release dates: January 2020 (IFFR); 3 September 2020 (Netherlands)
- Running time: 85 minutes
- Country: Netherlands
- Language: Dutch

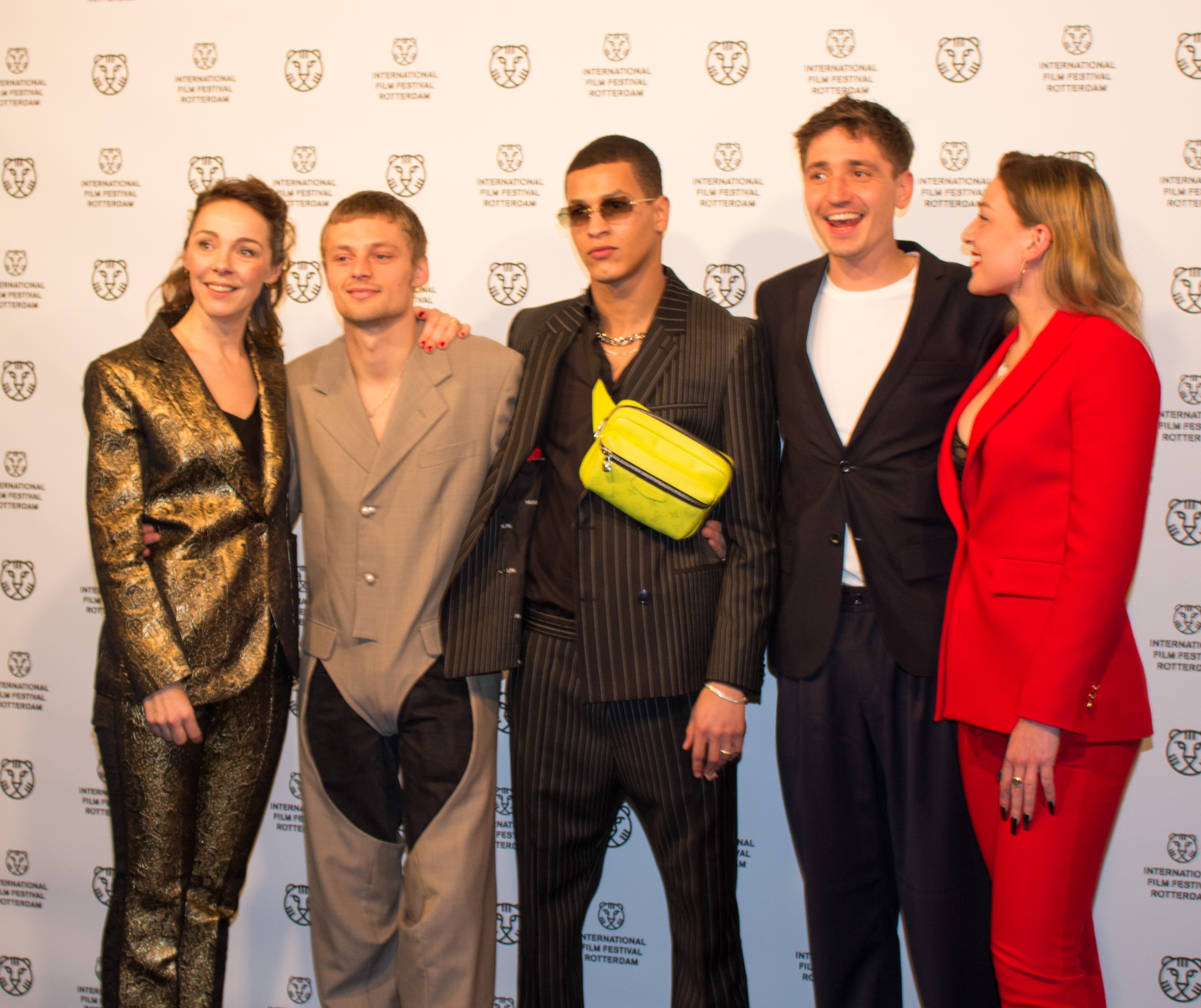
Paradise Drifters cast at premiere

Paradise Drifters is a 2020 Dutch film directed by Mees Peijnenburg. The film premiered at the 2020 International Film Festival Rotterdam.

Bilal Wahib won the Golden Calf for Best Supporting Actor award for his role in the film. Jonas Smulders was also nominated for the Golden Calf for Best Actor award for his role in the film. Jasper Wolf was also nominated for the Golden Calf for Best Camera award.
