= Gijs Blom =

Dutch actor (born 1997)

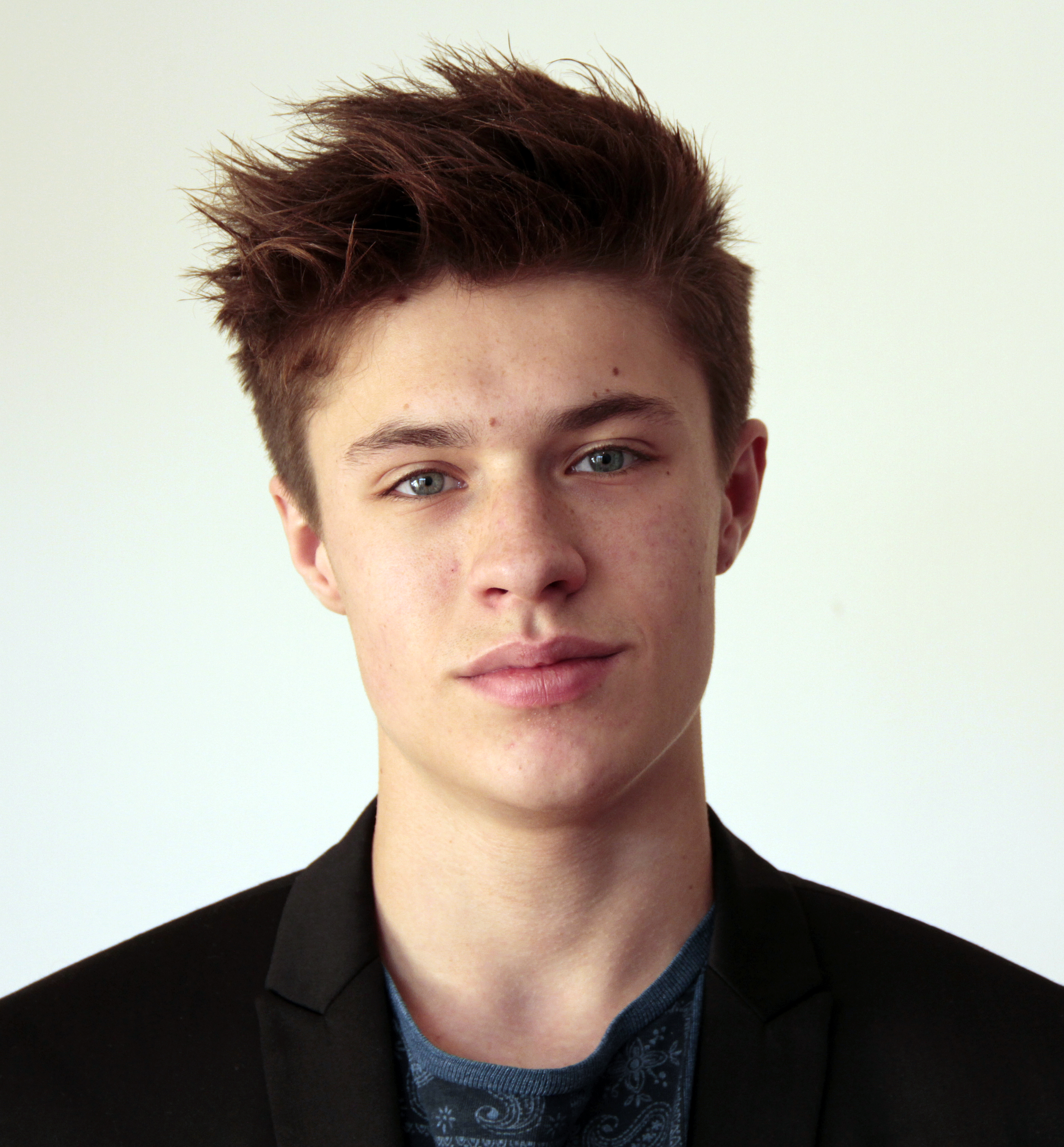
- Blom in 2013
- Born: Gijsbrecht Thijmen Matthias Blom; 2 January 1997 (age 29); Amsterdam, Netherlands
- Occupation: Actor
- Years active: 2007–present

Gijsbrecht Thijmen Matthias "Gijs" Blom (/ˈhaɪs ˈblɒm/ HEYES BLOM; Dutch: [ˈɣɛis ˈblɔm]; born 2 January 1997) is a Dutch actor. He starred in the films Jongens (2014) and The Forgotten Battle (2020). He received a Daytime Emmy nomination for his performance in the Netflix fantasy series The Letter for the King (2020).

== Early life and education ==
Blom is from Amsterdam. He is the son of stage actress Marloes van den Heuvel. He graduated with a degree in theatre from Amsterdam University of the Arts' Academy of Theatre and Dance in 2021.

== Career ==
From 2007 to 2009, Blom starred in the musical Ciske de Rat. In 2011, Blom landed his first feature film role in Maria Peeters' Sonny Boy. He then had small roles in the 2012 television films Urfeld and Eine Frau verschwindet; the latter a German production.

Blom starred as Sieger in the 2014 coming-of-age romance film Jongens, for which he received critical acclaim and a Golden Calf nomination for Best Actor at the Netherlands Film Festival. That same year, he produced and starred as Thijmen in the short film Escapade and appeared in the films Analgesics, Nena, and Pijnstillers.

Blom starred as a disillusioned Axis soldier Marinus van Staveren in the multilingual World War II film The Forgotten Battle alongside Jamie Flatters and Susan Radder. It is the second most expensive Dutch film production of all time and had an international release on Netflix in 2021. He also appeared in the films Dead & Beautiful and The Dutch Boys. Blom has a role in the Globoplay series Fallen.

== Filmography ==
=== Film ===
Year	Title	Role	Notes
2011	Sonny Boy	Wim	
2014	Sickos	Olivier	
2014	Nena	Carlo	
2014	Pijnstillers	Casper	
2014	Escapade	Thiamin	Short film
2017	Monk	Frederik	
2018	Dante vs. Mohammed Ali	Alexander	
2018	The Death & Life of John F. Donovan	Rupert Turner's boyfriend	
2019	Vals	Casper	English title: Vicious
2019	About That Life (Dutch: De Libi)	Daan	
2020	De Slag om de Schelde	Marinus van Staveren	English title: The Forgotten Battle
2021	Dead & Beautiful	Mason	
2021	The Dutch Boys	Alexander	Segment: "Dante vs. Mohammed Ali"
2022	Piece of My Heart	Jan	
2024	Invasion	Jack	

=== Television ===
Year	Title	Role	Notes
2006	Kerst Met Linus	Linus	
2012	Eine Frau verschwindet	Kevin	Television film
2012	Urfield	Tijn	Television film
2014	Jongens	Sieger	Television film
2015	4Jim	Jim	Main role
2016	Moordvrouw	Giel van Rijn	Episode: "Noodlot"
2016	La Famiglia	Angelo Esposito	Main role
2017	Silk Road	Raymond	Television film
2017	De mannentester	Noah Kramer	Main role
2017	Surrogate	Peter Martin	2 episodes
2018	Suspects	Noud Torenaar	2 episodes
2020	The Letter for the King	Prince Viridian	6 episodes
2022–2024	Bestseller Boy	Jurriaan	3 episodes
2024	Fallen	Daniel	8 episodes

== Awards and nominations ==
Year	Award	Category	Work	Result	Ref
2014	Zlín Film Festival	Best Youth Performance	Jongens	Won	
2014	Golden Calf Awards	Best Actor	Jongens	Nominated	
2015	Lucas International Children's Film Festival	Best Newcomer	Pijnstillers	Won	
2017	MIFF Awards	Best Actor	Silk Road	Nominated	
2021	Daytime Emmy Awards	Outstanding Lead Actor in a Daytime Fiction Program	The Letter for the King	Nominated	
