= Atlantic. =

- Film poster
- Directed by: Jan-Willem van Ewijk
- Written by: Bero Beyer; Abdelhadi Samih
- Produced by: Bero Beyer
- Starring: Jan-Willem van Ewijk; Thekla Reuten; Fettah Lamara; Mohamed Majd; Aron Michael Thompson; Boujmaa Guilloul; Hassna Souidi; Steven Novick; Wisal Hatimi; Soufyan Sahli; Mourad Zaoui
- Cinematography: Jasper Wolf
- Music by: Piet Swerts; Mourad Belouadi
- Release date: 7 December 2014 (Morocco)
- Running time: 94 minutes
- Country: Netherlands
- Language: English

Atlantic. is a 2014 Dutch film directed by Jan-Willem van Ewijk.

== Premise ==
A man starts to travel 600 kilometers to Europe on a wind surfboard along the Moroccan Atlantic coast.

== Cast ==
- Jan-Willem van Ewijk
- Thekla Reuten
- Fettah Lamara
- Mohamed Majd
- Aron Michael Thompson
- Boujmaa Guilloul
- Hassna Souidi
- Steven Novick
- Wisal Hatimi
- Soufyan Sahli
- Mourad Zaoui

== Reception ==
The film has been reviewed by Screen Daily and The Hollywood Reporter.
