= Brothers (2017 adventure film) =

2017 film

- Film poster
- Dutch: Broers
- Directed by: Bram Schouw
- Written by: Marcel Roijaards
- Starring: Jonas Smulders; Niels Gomperts
- Distributed by: SFD Film
- Release date: 1 June 2017
- Running time: 105 minutes
- Countries: Netherlands; Belgium; France
- Language: Dutch
- Box office: $76,217

Brothers (Dutch: Broers) is a 2017 Dutch adventure film directed by Bram Schouw. It was shortlisted by the EYE Film Institute Netherlands as one of the eight films to be selected as the potential Dutch submission for the Academy Award for Best Foreign Language Film at the 90th Academy Awards. However, it was not selected, with Layla M. being chosen as the Dutch entry.

== Cast ==
- Jonas Smulders as Lukas
- Niels Gomperts as Alexander
- Christa Theret as Josephine
