= Jonas Smulders =

Dutch film and television actor (born 1994)

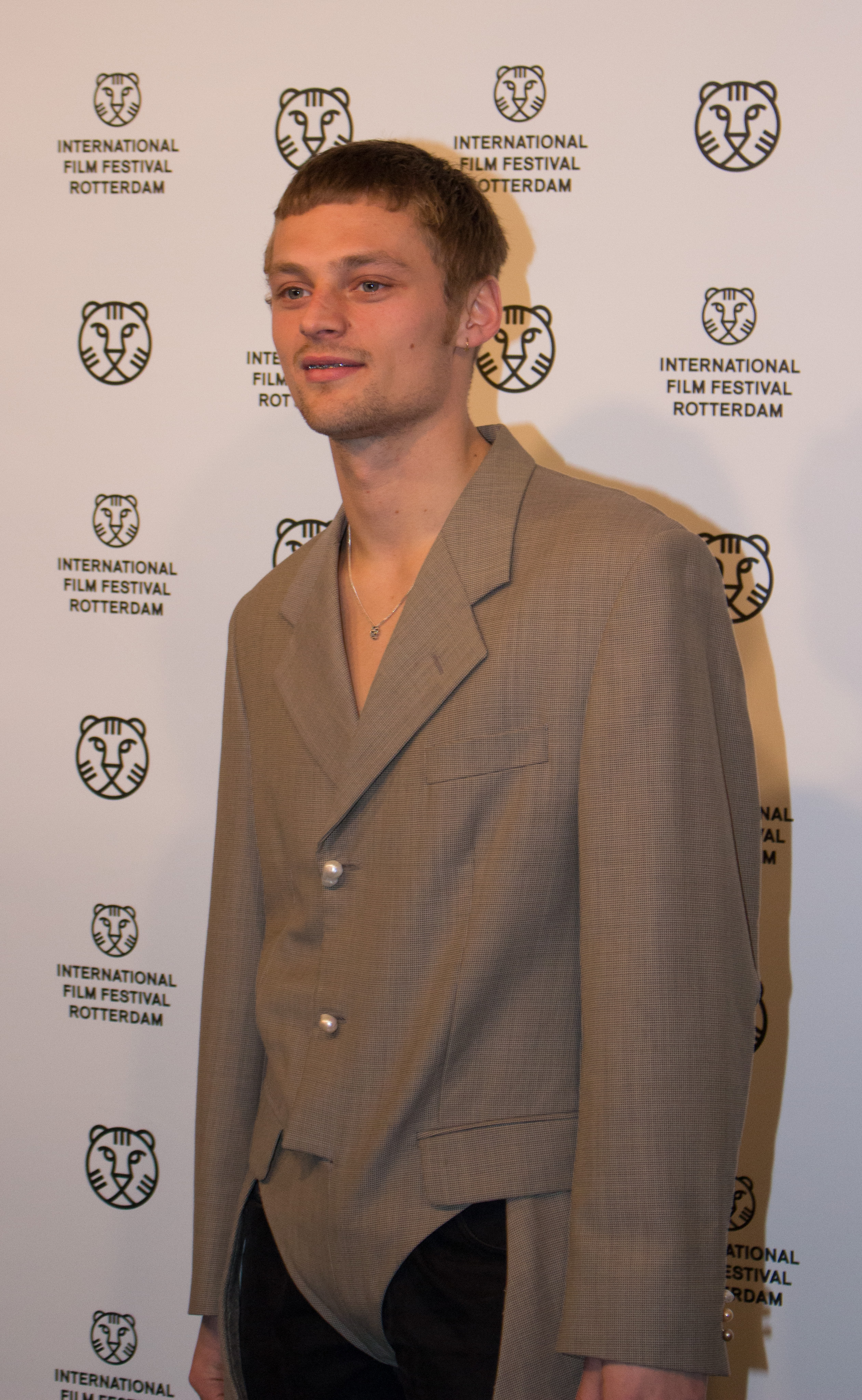
- Smulders at the premiere of Paradise Drifters, IFFR 2020
- Born: Jonas Smulders; January 1, 1994 (age 32); Amsterdam, Netherlands
- Occupation: Actor
- Years active: 2011–present

Jonas Smulders (Dutch: [jˈə͡ʊnəz smˈɛldəz]; born 1994) is a Dutch actor known for his performances in both independent and mainstream Dutch films. Recognized as one of the country's rising stars, he is best known for his leading role in Paradise Drifters (2020) and for winning the Golden Calf Best Actor in a Television Drama in 2015 for One Night Stand.

== Career ==
Smulders made his acting debut at the age of 16. He quickly gained recognition for portraying emotionally complex characters in films that often tackle contemporary social issues.

In 2015, he received national acclaim when he won the Golden Calf for Best Actor in a Television Drama at the Nederlands Film Festival for his role in Geen koningen in ons bloed, part of the acclaimed Dutch anthology series One Night Stand.

In 2018, Smulders was selected as one of the ten "European Shooting Stars" by the European Film Promotion at the Berlin International Film Festival, a prestigious program that highlights promising young actors from across Europe.

== Filmography ==
=== Film ===
- 2026 – Sanctuary
- 2024 – Ferry 2
- 2023 – Luka
- 2021 – Forever Rich
- 2020 – The East
- 2020 – Paradise Drifters
- 2018 – Open Seas
- 2017 – Silk Road
- 2017 – Brothers
- 2016 – Brasserie Valentijn
- 2015 – Een Goed Leven
- 2015 – Ventoux
- 2015 – Geen koningen in ons bloed
- 2014 – Jongens
- 2014 – Ketamine
- 2013 – The Dinner

=== Television ===
- 2022 – Modern Love Amsterdam
- 2020 – Hollands Hoop (Season 3)
- 2019 – De TV Kantine
- 2017 – Hollands Hoop (Season 2)
- 2016 – Zenith
- 2015 – 4JIM
- 2015 – Familie Kruys (Season 2)
- 2015 – A'dam & E.V.A (Season 3)
- 2015 – Noord/Zuid
- 2014 – Familie Kruys (Season 1)
- 2014 – Flikken Maastricht
- 2013 – Penoza (Season 3)
- 2011 – Hoe overleef ik

== Recognition ==
- 2015 – Golden Calf - Best Actor in a Television Drama – Geen koningen in ons bloed
- 2018 – Selected as one of the European Shooting Stars at the Berlinale
