= Clara McGregor =

British actress (born 1996)

- McGregor in 2026
- Born: 4 February 1996 (age 30); England
- Education: New York University
- Occupations: Actress; model
- Years active: 2017–present
- Father: Ewan McGregor
- Relatives: Esther McGregor (sister); Denis Lawson (great-uncle); Mary Elizabeth Winstead (stepmother)

Clara McGregor (born 4 February 1996) is a British actress. She is the eldest child of Scottish actor Ewan McGregor.

== Early life ==
Clara McGregor was born in England to Ewan McGregor and his first wife Eve Mavrakis. The eldest of McGregor's five children, she grew up in London until she was 12. She has three sisters, Esther, Jamyan, and Anouk. Her family moved around the world due to her father's acting career.

McGregor studied photography at the New York University Tisch School of the Arts before changing her major. She graduated in 2017 with a degree in film.

== Career ==
In 2017, McGregor signed with Wilhelmina Models. She has modelled for Playboy, Ferragamo, and Bluebella. She and Dutch actress Vera Bulder launched Deux Dames Entertainment, a production company that develops female-driven stories. In March 2021, it was announced that Deux Dames Entertainment and indie production company Black Magic would be producing a limited series adaptation of Goddess, a novel by Kelly Gardiner about 17th-century opera singer Julie d'Aubigny.

McGregor has made appearances in American Horror Story: NYC and the 2021 film Reefa, and has appeared alongside her father in films such as Christopher Robin, The Birthday Cake and Bleeding Love. In April 2024, it was announced that McGregor would appear in The Philosophy of Dress, a satire film directed by Cyrus Duff. In May 2024, she was cast in the lead role in Noon, a film directed by Xavier Palud. Palud previously directed the horror films Them and The Eye.

== Personal life ==
McGregor lives in Los Angeles with her family. She speaks French. Since 2017, she has been in a relationship with Jimmy Giannopoulos, who directed The Birthday Cake.

In 2019, McGregor revealed that she had been undergoing personal traumas, including addiction and depression. In June 2021, she was treated in an emergency room after being bitten on the face by a dog.

== Filmography ==
Key
†	Denotes productions that have not yet been released

=== Film ===
Year	Title	Role
2018	Christopher Robin	Girl in Aircraft Office
2021	Reefa	Frankie
2021	The Birthday Cake	Diane
2023	Bleeding Love	Daughter
2024	Running on Empty	Brittany
TBA	The Philosophy of Dress †	TBA
TBA	Noon †	Sasha

=== Television ===
Year	Title	Role
2022	American Horror Story: NYC	KK
