= Toon (TV series) =

2016 Dutch-language television series

- Genre: Comedy
- Created by: Dirk van Pelt; Beer ten Kate; Joep Vermolen
- Directed by: Beer ten Kate
- Starring: Loulou Hameleers; Amy van der Weerden; Joep Vermolen
- Country of origin: Netherlands
- Original language: Dutch
- No. of seasons: 2
- No. of episodes: 16

Production
- Running time: 25 minutes
- Production company: NewBeTV

Original release
- Network: KPN; Netflix (worldwide)
- Release: April 22, 2016

Toon is a 2016 Dutch-language comedy television series created by Dirk van Pelt, Beer ten Kate and Joep Vermolen, and starring Loulou Hameleers, Amy van der Weerden and Joep Vermolen. The plot revolves around introvert Toon (Joep Vermolen), a jingle writer who accidentally becomes an internet sensation after performing an impromptu song at a party in his home arranged by his sister and attended by her friends, all strangers to Toon. Joining him in the song is party-goer Nina (Amy van der Weerden). The song, titled "Get Out of My House," goes viral, catapulting Toon into the world of social media fame and show business, which he finds overwhelming and unwanted.

As Toon's fame grows, his sister becomes his manager, pushing him further into the spotlight he desperately wants to escape. The show humorously explores the absurdities of social media culture and the impact of unwanted fame on a private individual. Throughout the series, Toon navigates various awkward and comical situations that arise from his new-found celebrity status.

== Production ==
Toon was produced by KPN, a Dutch telecom company that ventured into creating original content similar to Netflix. The show was initially pitched as a low-budget web series but was eventually developed into a full-fledged TV series due to the unique concept and the chemistry between the creators and cast.

In a podcast interview on "Solopreneur: The One-Person Business Podcast," Joep Vermolen discussed how the show's concept was partly inspired by his own fears of fame and his experiences as a solopreneur. Vermolen emphasized the importance of collaboration and finding the right people to work with, a theme reflected in the creation and success of Toon.

== Cast ==
- Joep Vermolen as Toon
- Loulou Hameleers as Elise
- Amy van der Weerden as Nina
- Robbert Bleij as Robbie
- Arend Brandligt as Dylan
- Marijn Klaver as Ab
- Bart Rijnink as Ricardo
- Hanna van Vliet as Becky

== Release ==
Toon was released on April 22, 2016 on KPN, and was later released worldwide on Netflix.

== Reception ==
Toon received positive reviews for its witty take on social media culture and its relatable portrayal of an introvert thrust into the limelight. The show gained a cult following, and its success led to its acquisition by Netflix, making it accessible to an international audience. The English subtitles, crafted by Rinske Verberg, preserved the humor and nuance of the original Dutch dialogue, further contributing to its global appeal.
