= The Cinder Path =

1978 novel by Catherine Cookson

- First edition cover
- Author: Catherine Cookson
- Publisher: Heinemann
- Publication date: 1973
- Pages: 287

The Cinder Path is a 1978 novel by British author Catherine Cookson. In 1994, it was adapted into a film directed by Simon Langton.

== Plot introduction ==
In the English countryside of the early 20th century, the working-class protagonist must deal with a cruel and tyrannical father and later with a romantic tangle and a problematic marriage. He must keep, as well, a dark secret which must stay hidden at all costs.

Later, he is taken into the British Army fighting on the Western Front of the First World War, where the shadows of his past pursue him and lead to a climax.

== Plot summary ==
Charlie MacFell is the sixteen-year-old son of Edward MacFell, a cruel farm owner who punishes the farm's children and teenagers by beating them on a sharp cinder path, causing their hands and knees to be grazed. Among MacFell's main targets is Ginger Slater, a workhouse boy whom he whips for stealing a book to try and learn to read. Only MacFell's daughter, Betty, appears to like MacFell and she believes she would run the farm better than her brother.

Both MacFell and his neighbour, gentleman farmer Hal Chapman, have plans to marry Charlie to Chapman's elder daughter Victoria in the hope of one day uniting both their farms. MacFell has been bedding big Polly Benton, the wife of a crippled former labourer, as payment for her family keeping their cottage and plans to use her teenage daughter, young Polly, to "experience" Charlie. Although attracted to her, Charlie intends to refuse. Polly's brother Arthur misunderstands, thinking MacFell plans to bed Polly himself, and tries to prevent it by setting up a rope that causes MacFell to fall from his horse, accidentally killing him. Charlie covers the matter up, making it look as though the fall was an accident. He inherits the farm and, in order to prevent his mother evicting the Bentons in revenge for MacFell's infidelity, takes over managing it himself. In the old man's will a third of his money goes to his wife and the rest to Charlie. Betty is distressed to find out she has been left nothing.

Slater, the only other witness to MacFell's death, uses the knowledge to put pressure on Charlie and Arthur and ultimately blackmails Polly into marrying him. When Charlie is nineteen, Victoria's younger sister Nellie gets him drunk at her own birthday party and persuades him to propose to her. They are interrupted by her father and Victoria. Hal is happy to announce the engagement at the party, not caring which daughter Charlie marries, but Charlie quickly backs out of the engagement after sobering up the next morning. He then agrees to marry the more experienced Victoria.

The marriage soon falls apart; Victoria leaves the farm on inheriting a house in Newcastle and takes a lover, spreading stories that Charlie is impotent and their marriage was never consummated, while Nellie inherits a house in Gateshead. With the First World War raging, Charlie tries and fails to convince Victoria to return when his mother is dying. Old Arnold is no longer able to work as well, leaving Betty to handle most things alone. Betty wants to marry her beau Robin Weatherby and bring him to the farm but Charlie considers Weatherby lazy and insists if they are married she will have to leave.

When conscription begins, the now twenty-four-year-old Charlie decides against declaring himself exempt and finds himself at a training camp with Slater as his sergeant, who takes delight in humiliating him in revenge for his father's actions. Back at the farm, now being run with the help of prisoners of war, Charlie agrees that Betty can marry Weatherby and bring him there, but if he returns from the war then they must move out. He also says she has worked hard, so, if that happens, she can have half the profits of the farm. If he dies, she will have all of it as he has written a will that excludes Victoria.

Later, Charlie discovers Victoria's current lover is his company commander Major Smith. He tells Victoria her father is dying and she must go to him. Previously, Victoria has threatened to gain an annulment with her claim of non-consummation. Now Charlie threatens to divorce her. He also visits Nellie to tell her about her father. Charlie sees Polly on a bus and she says Slater treats her and their children well but she fears for Charlie. She warns him not to respond to Slater's provocation. On returning to camp, he is offered a commission, told that it is because they need officers and as a farmer he has given orders to men. He decides to keep quiet about Victoria's affair with Smith for the sake of the promotion.

On learning Nellie has tried to commit suicide because he ignored her, Charlie realises he loves her and makes plans to marry her in time, after first divorcing Victoria. Soon after, he is deployed to France and, at the dock, sees Arthur among the injured, having lost an arm and both legs. During a push into a German trench, Charlie ends up in charge of a small group of men including Slater. When his old enemy taunts him for 'buying' a commission with his wife's whoredom, Charlie shoots him dead in a rage, but since Slater's rifle was moving towards him at the time, it is later ruled self-defence. Slater's family are told he died bravely in battle and Charlie is commended for getting the rest of the men back safely.

Towards the end of the war, Charlie suffers shrapnel injuries and wakes in hospital. A large chunk is lodged close to his heart: If it moves away from it, it can be removed, but it could move into it and kill him. Betty visits and says Wetherby is no longer her beau. She produces a document, which she convinces Charlie to sign, saying his signature is needed for authorisation now he's back in the country. Nellie comes to see him and mentions Victoria is planning to marry Smith. Charlie visits Arthur, who survived his wounds and who reveals he has been told by Polly that the farm has been sold.

Charlie rushes home to find Betty has sold the farm's furniture and livestock and fled with the money, with the paper he signed in hospital giving her authorisation. Nellie promises to sell her house to help rebuild the farm. She and Charlie consummate their relationship in the old hayloft causing the shrapnel to move away from his heart and leaving him hopeful for the future.

== Television adaptation ==
In 1994, the novel was adapted into a three-part mini-series as part of ITV's series of adaptations of Catherine Cookson's novels. The adaptation starred Lloyd Owen as Charlie, Catherine Zeta-Jones as Victoria, Maria Miles as Nellie and Polly Adams as the girls' mother Florence. It was largely faithful to the source material, only removing a few minor characters and situations such as Charlie's encounter with a scrap merchant who gave him a lift, and adding extra scenes between Charlie and Nellie during their relationship (such as a last minute farewell at the train station before he is deployed) and a final confrontation between Charlie and Victoria, who is absent from the last third of the novel.
