= The Cinder Path (film) =

Three part 1994 TV series

- Genre: Drama
- Based on: The Cinder Path by Catherine Cookson
- Written by: Alan Seymour
- Directed by: Simon Langton
- Starring: Lloyd Owen; Catherine Zeta-Jones; Polly Adams; Ralph Ineson; Tom Bell; Maria Miles; Anthony Byrne; Rosalind Ayres; Victoria Scarborough; Lucy Akhurst
- Music by: Barrington Pheloung
- Country of origin: United Kingdom
- Original language: English
- No. of series: 1
- No. of episodes: 3

Production
- Producer: Ray Marshall
- Running time: 150 minutes (three episodes of 50 minutes)
- Production company: Tyne Tees Television

Original release
- Network: ITV
- Release: 17 April – 1 May 1994

The Cinder Path is a three-part 1994 television series, produced by Yorkshire/Tyne Tees, directed by Simon Langton and based on the novel of the same name by Catherine Cookson.

== Plot introduction ==
In the English countryside of the early 20th century, the prosperous, middle class farmer's son Charlie MacFell must deal with a cruel and tyrannical father and later with a romantic tangle and a problematic marriage. He must keep, as well, a dark secret which must stay hidden at all costs.

Later, he is taken into the British Army fighting on the Western Front of the First World War, where the shadows of his past pursue him and lead to a climax.

== Film ==
- Screenplay: Alan Seymour
- Music: Barrington Pheloung
- Executive Producers: Ray Townsend & Keith Richardson
- Producer: Ray Marshall
- Director: Simon Langton

== Cast ==
- Lloyd Owen – as Charlie MacFell
- Catherine Zeta-Jones – as Victoria Chapman
- Polly Adams - as Florence Chapman
- Ralph Ineson - as Arthur Benton
- Tom Bell - as Edward MacFell
- Maria Miles - as Nellie Chapman
- Anthony Byrne - as Ginger Slater
- Osmund Bullock – as Major Smith
- Rosalind Ayres - as Mary MacFell
- Victoria Scarborough - as Betty MacFell
- Lucy Akhurst - as Polly Benton
- Declan Donnelly - as stable boy
