= About That Life (film) =

2019 film

- Film poster
- Dutch: De Libi
- Directed by: Shady El-Hamus
- Written by: Shady El-Hamus; Jeroen Scholten van Aschat
- Starring: Bilal Wahib; Daniel Kolf; Oussama Ahammoud; Vera Bulder
- Cinematography: Stephan Polman
- Edited by: Patrick Schonewille
- Music by: Terence Dunn; Ko Zandvliet
- Distributed by: Gusto Entertainment
- Release date: 13 June 2019
- Running time: 102 minutes
- Country: Netherlands
- Language: Dutch
- Box office: $477,162

About That Life (Dutch: De Libi) is a 2019 Dutch comedy-drama film directed by Shady El-Hamus (in his directorial debut) who co-wrote with Jeroen Scholten van Aschat. In July 2019, it was shortlisted as one of the nine films in contention to be the Dutch entry for the Academy Award for Best International Feature Film at the 92nd Academy Awards, but it was not selected.

== Cast ==
- Bilal Wahib as Bilal
- Daniel Kolf as Gregg
- Oussama Ahammoud as Kev
- Vera Bulder as Liv

== Production ==
In September 2018, it was announced that rapper Hef, Bilal Wahib and Daniel Kolf were added to the cast. Principal photography took place in the summer of 2018.
