= András Szántó =

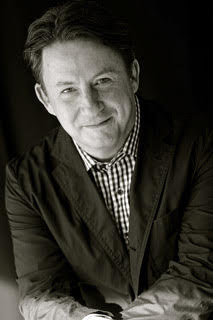
- Born: January 1, 1964 (age 62); Budapest, Hungary
- Education: Corvinus University, Budapest (BA) & Columbia University, New York (Ph.D.)
- Spouse: Alanna Stang
- Website: https://www.andras-szanto.com

András Szántó (born January 1, 1964) advises museums, foundations, educational institutions, and leading brands worldwide on cultural strategy. He has directed the National Arts Journalism Program at Columbia University and has overseen the Global Museum Leaders Colloquium at the Metropolitan Museum of Art.

He published three books recently investigating the outlooks for art institutions: The Future of the Museum: 28 Dialogues (2020); Imagining the Future Museum: 21 Dialogues With Architects (2022); and The Future of the Art World: 38 Dialogues (2025).

== Life and career ==
After a youth spent in Budapest and London, Szántó attended the Budapest University of Economics (now Corvinus University). His bachelor's thesis investigated Stalinist-era persecution in Eastern Europe and was published in 1989.

Szántó moved to New York City to pursue graduate studies in sociology. At the Graduate Center of the City University of New York, he conducted a study on classical pianists. In 1989, he moved to Columbia University, where, as a Lazarsfeld Fellow, he shifted his focus to the institutions of the visual art world. He regularly published journalism and worked as an analyst at the Media Studies Center, a think-tank. His 1996 Ph.D. dissertation, Gallery Transformations in the New York Art World in the 1980's, is a sociological analysis of the institutional dynamics of art.

While at Columbia, Szántó published journalism and worked as an analyst at the Media Studies Center, a think-tank. In 1997–2005, he was deputy director and subsequently director of the National Arts Journalism Program (NAJP), in association with Columbia's schools of Journalism and Arts.

Szántó has lectured on sociology at Columbia and at Barnard College and taught art business and marketing communications at the Sotheby's Institute of Art in New York.

== Culture and strategy ==
Szántó's strategic advisory clients span the art world, from non-profit institutions to commercial brands. His consulting encompasses early-stage visioning and strategic planning, the design and implementation of corporate programming and marketing initiatives, the design of conferences and public forums, and publications and communications linked to them. Planning projects frequently address the needs of organizations operating at the intersection of multiple disciplines and innovative projects promoting new practices and experimentation in the arts.

=== Institutional Strategy ===
Institutional projects include moderating the Global Museum Leaders Colloquium at The Metropolitan Museum of Art; strategic visioning and planning for Geneva's Museum of Art and History; the development of the Art Writing Program for The Andy Warhol Foundation for the Visual Arts; a comprehensive vision and plan for the arts at Michigan State University; and a multi-year stabilization and operating plan for the Brooklyn-based multidisciplinary organization Pioneer Works.

Institutional clients have included The Guggenheim Museum and Foundation, The Dallas Museum of Art, Stanford University, Kunstmuseum Basel, MSU Broad Museum, Asia Society, The Pew Charitable Trusts, Moholy-Nagy University of Art and Design, Budapest Museum of Fine Arts, The National Endowment for the Arts, The Rosenkranz Foundation, The Peabody-Essex Museum, Punto Urban Art Museum, Rockefeller Archive Center, Tel Aviv Museum of Art, and the Vilcek Foundation. Previously, as a senior consultant with AEA Consulting, strategic planning projects included The Public Art Fund, Tribeca Film Institute, MoCAD in Detroit, SculptureCenter, The Meserve Kunhardt Foundation, Roundabout Theater Company, the Knight Foundation, and the Isabella Stewart Gardner Museum. With AEA, Szántó was instrumental to the initial conceptualization and naming of PowerHouse Arts in Brooklyn.

In recent years, Andras Szanto LLC has undertaken strategic planning at a number of leading US art museums and arts organizations, including The Joslyn, in Omaha, SITE Santa Fe, Akron Art Museum, RISD Museum, Providence, MIT Museum, Cambridge, Clyfford Still Museum, Denver. Other recent museum strategy projects have included internal advance planning for the Nelson Atkins Museum in Kansas City and evaluation and planning of collaborative initiatives among Midwest art museums for the Toledo Museum of Art.

In 2021, Szántó, working in collaboration with Hans-Ulrich Obrist, helped conceptualize and launch Unfinished Camp, a global network of art organizations seeking to engage the voices of artists in conversations around ethical technology. The same year, he led a team in the design and launch of the Climate Art Awards, in collaboration with Asia Society, National Gallery of Art, The Philipps Collection, the Hirschhorn Museum and Sculpture Garden, and the Environmental Defense Fund. In 2025, he and his team started advising the REEFLINE, an underwater sculpture park and hybrid reef off the shore of Miami Beach.

In 2022, Szanto helped to conceptualize and launch a new international museum leadership program based at the Fine Arts Museums of San Francisco, the Museums of Tomorrow Roundtable (MTR). The second MTR will convene in May 2025.

In addition to strategic planning and development, Szántó has assisted foundations with research studies and evaluation and policy reports, including The Henry Luce Foundation, The Andrew W. Mellon Foundation, the RAND Corporation, the Open Society Institute, the Aspen Institute, The Wallace Foundation, and The Robert Sterling Clark Foundation.

Projects advancing new institutional practices in the art museum ecosystem include a creative-aging initiative for E.A. Michelson Philanthropy and a financing and public engagement platform utilizing new financial technologies with the Danish Faurschou Foundation. Szántó has also advised individual creators and their studios, including the artist Jeffrey Gibson and the network scientist Albert-László Barabási.

=== Corporate and brand initiatives ===
Szántó has played a lead role in designing and advising on the implementation of landmark corporate art initiatives.

In 2011, Szántó helped relaunch the art program of The Absolut Company, including its Art Bar series (with Nadim Abbas, Los Carpinteros, Mickalene Thomas, Ry Rocklen, Adrian Wong, and others), and served until 2018 as principal advisor to the Absolut Art Bureau. Starting in 2013, Szántó developed an art strategy for Swiss watchmaker Audemars Piguet and since then has served as the company's art liaison and member of its Art Advisory Council, advising on projects at the intersection of art, technology, and science by, among others, Theo Jansen, Cao Fei, Ryoji Ikeda, Lars Jan, Robin Meier, Tomás Saraceno, Jan Winderen, Quayola, and Sun Xun. In 2014, Szántó helped conceive the BMW Art Journey, a joint initiative of BMW and Art Basel, which sends artists on journeys of creative discovery worldwide; he serves as the initiative's strategic advisor and editor of its book series, collaborating closely with the recipients: Astha Butail, Leelee Chan, Jamal Cyrus, Julien Creuzet, Henning Fehr & Philipp Rühr, Zac Landon Pole, Abigail Reyolds, Max Hooper Schneider, and Samson Young. More recently, András Szántó LLC has provided strategic advice to MGM Resorts Arts & Culture in integrating art into hospitality.

Starting in 2012, Szántó led the development of the Davidoff Art Initiative, supporting art and artists of the Caribbean region. He helped establish residency studios at the Altos de Chavon School in the Dominican Republic and partnerships with residency organizations in Asia, Europe, and the Americas. The project relaunched in 2019 as the non-profit Caribbean Art Initiative.

For more than a decade, Szántó has been a retained strategic advisor to Art Basel, the world's leading art fair, advising in particular on new business initiatives, including Art Basel's Crowdfunding collaboration with Kickstarter, which helped raise more than $1 million for arts organizations worldwide, and its Art Basel Cities series, including the conceptualization and development of a multi-year project in Buenos Aires, Argentina.

== Writing, policy, and convening ==
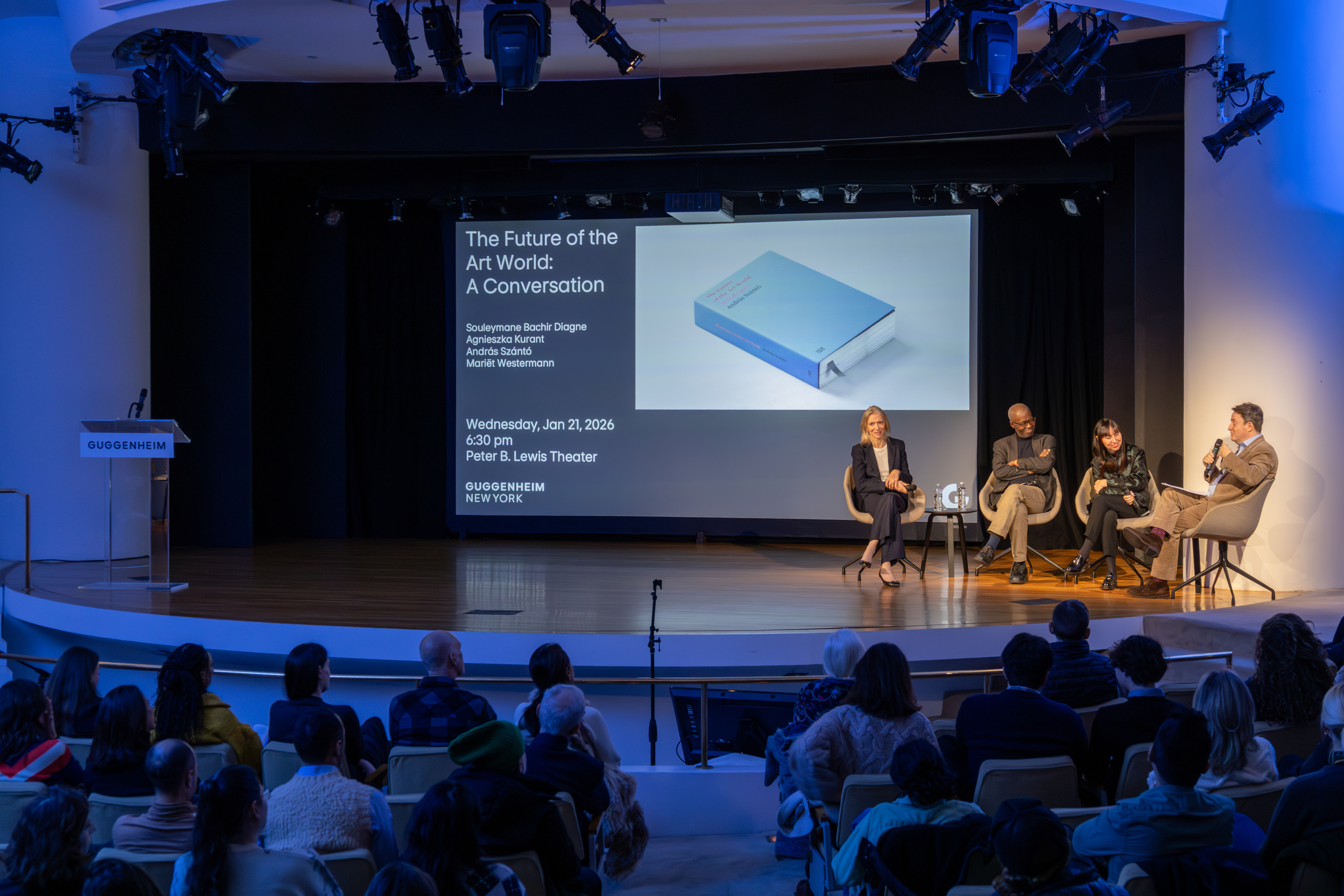
The Future of the Art World: A Conversation, January 21, 2026. Photo: Ed Marshall © Solomon R. Guggenheim Foundation, New York.

Much of Szántó's writing examines arts and cultural institutions, in particular the dynamics of the contemporary art world and art market. His books, The Future of the Museum (2020), and Imagining the Future of the Museum (2023), feature dialogues with art museum directors and architects from around the world, highlighting the evolving functions of museums in a changing society. He is the author, most recently, of The Future of the Art World: 38 Dialogues (2025), which includes conversations with artists, curators, sociologists, philosophers, patrons, policymakers, and leading figures in the art trade assess the changing playing field on which art institutions operate.

Szántó's journalism and commentary have appeared in The New York Times, The Los Angeles Times, The Wall Street Journal, The Boston Globe, Artforum, The American Prospect, I.D., Architecture, Print, Interiors, Men's Vogue, Museum Practice, and other publications. He has been a contributing editor of The Art Newspaper and was a co-founder of ArtworldSalon, an online publication on art institutions and markets. He is the former editor of the journals ARTicles and Reflections. Earlier, Szántó worked extensively as a translator of art history and art criticism.

His research and writings have explored the strategies, missions, and architecture of art museums, the transformative role of technology, and current debates in cultural policy, including financing and philanthropy, and the rhetoric of cultural advocacy. To gain a better understanding of art-brand collaborations, Szántó initiated the Cultural Citizenship report, based on an online survey of experts. He contributed to the 2010 Aspen Institute report, The Artist as Philanthropist: Strengthening the Next Generation of Artist-endowed Foundations and to the influential 2005 RAND Corporation study, A Portrait of the Visual arts: Meeting the Challenges of a New Era.

Szántó has also published widely on politics, history, and public affairs. While in college in Budapest, he researched the then-taboo topic of forced resettlements in Stalinist Hungary, published as a book in 1989. In New York, he served as a correspondent for Magyar Narancs, the first Hungarian alternative weekly. In 2007, he organized a conference on propaganda at the New York Public Library, funded by George Soros, and edited the companion book of essays titled What Orwell Didn't Know: Propaganda and the New Face of American Politics.

Szántó's writing and policy interests frequently extend to the planning and oversight of symposia and professional forums. He has overseen four sessions of the Global Museum Leaders Colloquium at the Metropolitan Museum of Art. Since 2008, he has moderated discussions of global museum leaders at Art Basel in Miami Beach, Basel, and Hong Kong, at the Global Art Forum in Dubai, and many other events. He oversaw the 2012 International Art Industry Forum in Vienna, Austria. In 2019, he spearheaded a novel talks-program format for Art Basel Cities in Buenos Aires, Parallel Rooms. In 2023 he served as Consulting Director of the Museum of Tomorrow Roundtable based at the Fine Art Museum of San Francisco.

A former Senior Advisor to the Hungarian Minister of Culture and Education, Szántó has been active in the field of cultural diplomacy and international cultural engagement. In 2001, he helped establish the Transatlantic Forum for Cultural Research at UNESCO in Paris. In 2003, he co-organized a Columbia University conference, Arts and Minds: Cultural Diplomacy Amid Global Tensions. In 2012, he moderated a Salzburg Seminar, on Public and Private Cultural Exchange-Based Diplomacy: New Models for the 21st Century. He participated in and wrote the summary reports for two sessions of the Asia Society's US-China Museum Directors Forum in Beijing.

== Curatorial projects ==
In addition to contributing to the curatorial development of exhibitions and commissions linked to initiatives he had designed and advised, Szántó has organized two survey exhibitions of art of the Hungarian neo-avantgarde: Hungarian Artists of the Sixties and Seventies, at the Elizabeth Dee Gallery in New York (2017) and Revisiting Hungarian Art of the 1960s and 1970s, in London (2018). He edited and contributed the lead essay to books tied to each exhibition.

== Service & Family ==
Szántó, a Trustee of the Brooklyn Museum since 2025, currently serves as a member of the Board of the Moholy-Nagy Foundation, Thyssen-Bornemisza Art Contemporary (TBA21) and the Dorothea and Leo Rabkin Foundation; as a member of the advisory board of Casa Batlló in Barcelona and Cora, Institute for Cultural Entrepreneurship in Basel; as the Chair of International Advisory Board, László Moholy Nagy University of Art and Design, Budapest; and a trustee of the Museum of Art and Photography (MAP) in Bangalore, India, and chairman of the council of patrons of the Swiss-based Caribbean Art Initiative. He is the former chair of the Visiting Committee of the San Francisco Art Institute and has served on the advisory boards of Apexart, The Alliance for the Arts, the Gordon Parks Foundation, the George H. Heyman Center for Philanthropy at NYU, and the research advisory committee of the CPANDA (Cultural Policy and the Arts National Data Archive) at Princeton University, and currently serves Advisor to the Aspen Institute’s Artist-Endowed Foundations Initiative (AEFI).

He lives in New York City with his wife, Alanna Stang, a magazine editor, author on sustainable architecture, and communications consultant, and their sons, Alexander and Hugo.

== Selected publications ==
- What Orwell Didn't Know. New York: PublicAffairs, 2007.
- A Portrait of the Visual Arts: Meeting the Challenges of a New Era. Arthur Brooks, Kevin McCarthy, Elizabeth Ondaatje, András Szántó, eds. Santa Monica: RAND Research in the Arts, 2005.
- The New Gatekeepers: Emerging Challenges to Freedom of Expression in the Arts, Christopher Hawthorne and András Szántó, eds. New York: National Arts Journalism Project and DAP, 2004.
- Hot and Cool: Some Contrasts between the Visual Art Worlds of New York and Los Angeles in New York & Los Angeles: Politics, Society, and Culture: A Comparative View, David Halle, ed. Chicago and London: University of Chicago Press, 2003.

=== Selected chapters & reports ===
- Toward a Closer Understanding of Our Differences: Summary Report on the Second U.S.-China Museum Leaders Forum. Editor, with Orville Schell and Peggy Loar. Asia Society, New York, New York, 2015.
- What Orwell Didn't Know: Propaganda and the New Face of American Politics. Editor. New York: PublicAffairs, 2007.
- A Portrait of the Visual Arts: Meeting the Challenges of a New Era. With Kevin McCarthy, Elizabeth Ondaatje and Arthur Brooks. RAND Research in the Arts. Santa Monica: 2005.
- The New Gatekeepers: Emerging Challenges to Freedom of Expression in the Arts. Editor, with Christopher Hawthorne. New York: NAJP and D.A.P., 2004.
- "A New Mandate for Philanthropy? U.S. Foundation Support for International Arts Exchanges." Cultural Diplomacy Research Series; Washington D.C.: The Center for Arts and Culture, 2003.
- "Hot and Cool: Some Contrasts between the Visual Art Worlds of New York and Los Angeles." In: New York & Los Angeles: Politics, Society, and Culture: a Comparative View. (David Halle, ed.) Chicago and London: University of Chicago Press, 2003.
- The Visual Art Critic: A Survey of Art Critics at General-Interest News Publications in America. New York, NAJP: Columbia University, 2002.
- "Don’t Shoot the Messenger: Why the Art World and the Press Don’t Get Along." In: Unsettling 'Sensation': Arts-Policy Lessons from the Brooklyn Museum of Art Controversy. Rutgers Press, 2001.
- Kitörö Éberséggel, Az 1951-es Budapesti Kitelepítések Története. With Tibor Desseffwy. Budapest: Háttér, 1989.

=== Selected essays, journalism and commentary ===
- From Bark to Snark: Arts Journalism Seeks Its Way in the Twenty-First Century. Journal of the Clark, Volume 16. December 2015.
- “China’s New Age of Enlightenment.” The Art Newspaper, Apr. 2011
- “Funding: The State of the Art.” The Art Newspaper, June 2010.
- "The Museum Revisited" Artforum, Summer 2010.
- "Will US Museums Succeed in Reinventing Themselves?" The Art Newspaper, Jan. 2010.
- "Actually, It was the Inept Empire." The Los Angeles Times, June 8, 2004
- "In the Art Business, 44210 Points Makes Polke a Top Painter." The New York Times, April 4, 2004
- "The Dutch Give the Arts A Dash of (Cold) Water." The New York Times, March 9, 2003
- “A Business Built on the Hard-to-Sell.” The New York Times, Oct. 6, 2002
- “The Business of Art.” The American Prospect, Feb. 28, 2000.
- “Nostalgia for Socialism.” The Boston Globe, May 29, 1994.
