= Bodies Bodies Bodies =

2022 film by Halina Reijn

- Theatrical release poster
- Directed by: Halina Reijn
- Screenplay by: Sarah DeLappe
- Story by: Kristen Roupenian
- Produced by: David Hinojosa; Ali Herting
- Starring: Amandla Stenberg; Maria Bakalova; Myha'la; Chase Sui Wonders; Rachel Sennott; Lee Pace; Pete Davidson
- Cinematography: Jasper Wolf
- Edited by: Taylor Levy; Julia Bloch
- Music by: Disasterpeace
- Production company: 2AM
- Distributed by: A24 (United States); Stage 6 Films (international; through Sony Pictures Releasing International) (Note: excludes China)
- Release dates: March 14, 2022 (SXSW); August 5, 2022 (United States)
- Running time: 94 minutes
- Country: United States
- Language: English
- Budget: $3 million
- Box office: $14 million

Bodies Bodies Bodies is a 2022 American black comedy horror film directed by Halina Reijn and written by Sarah DeLappe from a story by Kristen Roupenian. It features an ensemble cast which includes Amandla Stenberg, Maria Bakalova, Myha'la, Chase Sui Wonders, Rachel Sennott, Lee Pace, and Pete Davidson as friends at a house party who play a murder in the dark–style game called Bodies Bodies Bodies, which quickly goes wrong.

Bodies Bodies Bodies premiered at South by Southwest on March 14, 2022, and was theatrically released in the United States on August 5, 2022, by A24. The film grossed $14 million at the box office and received generally positive reviews from critics, who praised the humor and the cast's performances.

== Plot ==
Bee, a young working-class woman from Eastern Europe, travels with her wealthy girlfriend Sophie to a "hurricane party" at a mansion owned by the family of Sophie's best friend David. Other guests include David's girlfriend and so-called actress Emma, the podcaster Alice, her much-older new boyfriend Greg, and the enigmatic Jordan. Max, another guest, left after a fight with David the night before Sophie and Bee arrived.

After drug and alcohol fuelled dancing, the group decides to play "Bodies Bodies Bodies," a murder in the dark-style game. David punches Greg during a slapping game and teases him for being the corpse in the murder game, so Greg goes to bed. David also leaves after an argument with Emma. Stormy conditions knock the electricity out and Bee finds David outside with his throat slashed, a blood-stained kukri nearby. Panicked, without cell reception, the group is unable to go for help because Sophie's car battery is found to be dead. The group confronts Greg, suspicious that he has a go bag with a knife and a map. Thinking it part of the game, Greg responds with hostility and Bee fearfully bludgeons him to death with a kettlebell.

Doubting Greg was the killer, Alice theorizes that Max, who had confessed feelings for her, returned to kill David. Sophie, a recovering addict, relapses and argues with Emma, apologizes, and is then kissed by Emma. Alice later finds Emma dead from a head wound and believes the group is being killed one by one. Jordan and Alice discover there is no record of Bee's name among her college's graduates and they throw Bee out into the hurricane.

Bee finds underwear in the backseat of Sophie's car that matches Jordan's bra, spots Jordan holding David's father's gun through a window, and crawls back inside through a pet door. Bee explains to the group she dropped out of college to care for her mother, who has borderline personality disorder. The group argues, Jordan is identified as the "killer" in the Bodies Bodies Bodies game, and she reveals her resentment of Sophie's drug addiction and accuses her of using David to regain access to her trust fund. Sophie denies cheating on Bee with Jordan, explaining she avoids her friends because their behavior challenges her sobriety, and reveals that Jordan only "hate-listens" to Alice's podcast. When Alice throws Jordan's insecurities in her face, Jordan shoots Alice in the leg. During a struggle for the gun Alice is fatally shot in the throat. Sophie and Jordan also grapple and Bee pushes Jordan over the staircase banister. With her dying breath, Jordan tells Bee to check Sophie's text messages and shoots in their direction multiple times. The distrustful Bee hides from Sophie.

The storm has blown over the next morning. Sophie confesses to Bee that she relapsed and saw Emma fall down the stairs to her death. When Bee demands to see her texts at gunpoint, Sophie tosses her phone away and they struggle, inadvertently picking up David's phone which show David accidentally slashed his own throat trying to use the kukri to open a champagne bottle. Bee and Sophie realize the bloodshed was all for nothing as there had been no murder. Max returns to the mansion, and the power returns. When Max asks what happened, Bee only says that she now has service on her phone.

== Cast ==
- Amandla Stenberg as Sophie
- Maria Bakalova as Bee
- Myha'la as Jordan
- Chase Sui Wonders as Emma
- Rachel Sennott as Alice
- Lee Pace as Greg
- Pete Davidson as David
- Conner O'Malley as Max

== Production ==
In March 2018, A24 acquired Bodies, Bodies, Bodies, a spec script written by Kristen Roupenian. In the early drafts of the original script there was a killer included, but Reijn and DeLappe decided to excise the character.

In September 2019, it was announced Chloe Okuno would re-write the script and direct the film. In April 2021, it was reported that Amandla Stenberg and Maria Bakalova were set to star in the film, while Pete Davidson and Myha'la were in talks to join the cast, with Halina Reijn now set to direct. Bakalova said she was scared to be in a horror film, having been frightened watching them, but thought that A24 films were deeper; she said that the film was "more like an R-rated comedy." In May 2021, actors Lee Pace, Rachel Sennott, Chase Sui Wonders, and Conner O'Malley joined the film, with Davidson and Herrold's casting also being confirmed.

Principal photography began in May 2021, with filming taking place at a Georgian stone manor house in Chappaqua, New York.

Ultimately, Roupenian was given a "Story by" credit for her work on the film's screenplay, while The Wolves playwright Sarah DeLappe received sole, final "Screenplay by" credit.

=== Music ===
The film's music score was composed by Disasterpeace in March 2022. Charli XCX performed the song "Hot Girl" for the film, which was released as a single on July 26, 2022. The 9-music scores album was released on August 10, 2022, by A24 Music. Meghan Currier was credited as the music supervisor for the film, which contains 15 credited songs from a wide variety of artists including Shygirl, Kilo Kish, Princess Nokia, Azealia Banks, Slayyyter and Tommy Genesis. The music selection features a heavy prominence of female rappers and singer-songwriters.

== Themes and influences ==
Bodies Bodies Bodies has been described as a "satire on class and privilege, all mediated by new technology, the language of progressive politics and youth culture, and Gen Z identity itself". In a piece for The New York Times, Kalia Richardson writes that the film satirizes Gen-Z's symbiotic relationship with their cellphones and the internet, using dark humor to illustrate what happens when those two things became inaccessible: "when the Wi-Fi goes out, it's like they lose oxygen", remarks director Halina Reijn. Richardson notes that despite "the physical danger each character faces, their virtual realities remain central to the plot", recalling the characters' inability to relate to each other in person without the use of the "trauma-centered" jargon of social media such as "gaslight", "trigger", and "toxic".

Several critics noted the influence of Agatha Christie or specifically her 1939 mystery novel And Then There Were None on the film. In an interview with Vice, director Halina Reijn cited the many films that influenced Bodies Bodies Bodies, such as Heathers (1988), Don's Plum (2001), Who's Afraid of Virginia Woolf? (1966), The Piano Teacher (2001), Cries and Whispers (1972), and the filmography of John Cassavetes. In an interview with Variety, Reijn revealed that the real-life Michael Peterson murder case in The Staircase inspired the scene of Emma's body at the bottom of the stairs.

== Release ==
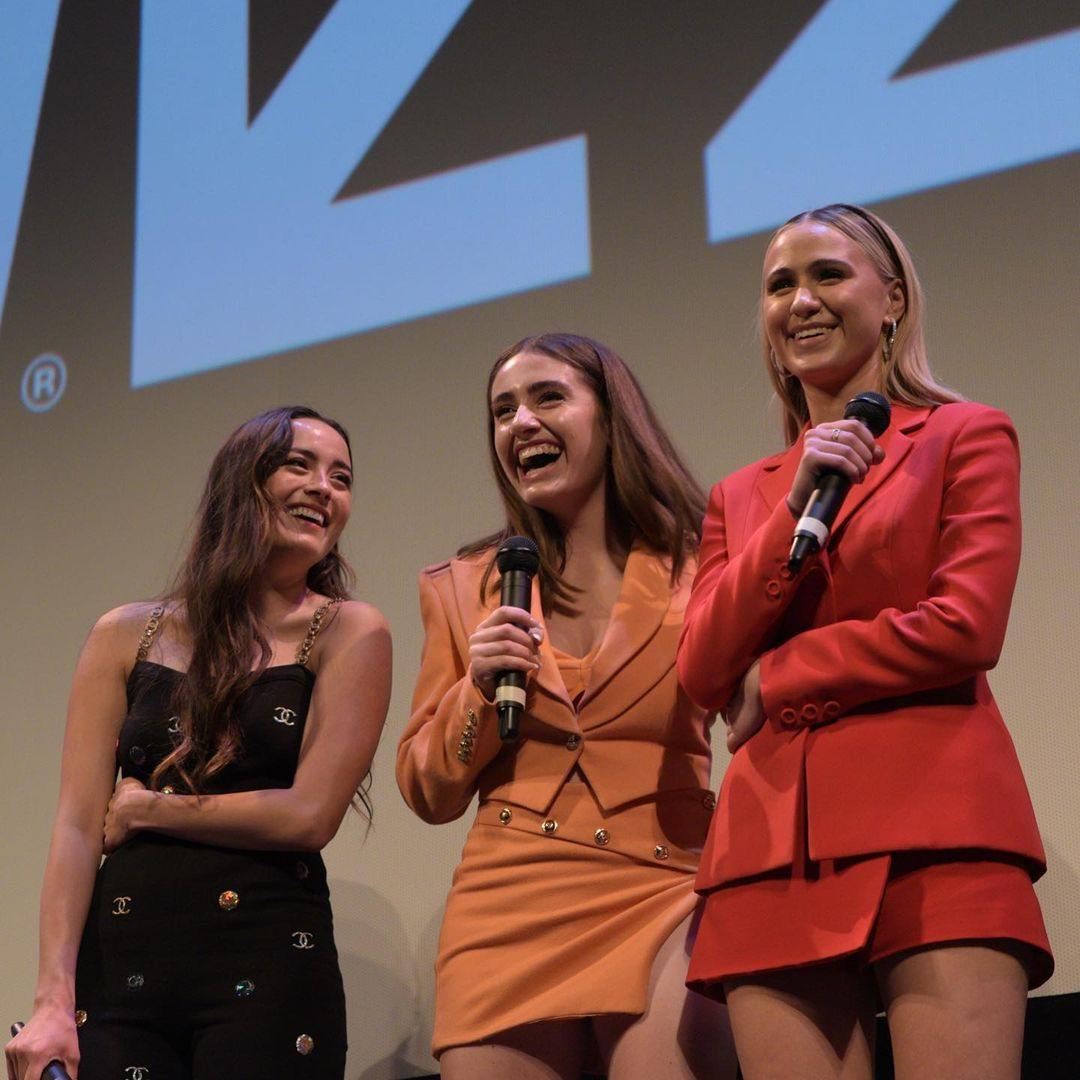
Chase Sui Wonders, Rachel Sennott and Maria Bakalova at SXSW in 2022

Bodies Bodies Bodies premiered at the 2022 South by Southwest Film Festival on March 14. It was theatrically released on August 5, 2022, in select cities, before a nationwide expansion on August 12. In April 2022, Stage 6 Films acquired international distribution rights outside China to the film.

The film was released on VOD on September 27, 2022, followed by release on Blu-ray and DVD on October 18, 2022.

== Reception ==
=== Box office ===
In its opening weekend, Bodies Bodies Bodies made $226,653 from six theaters in Los Angeles and New York City. The $37,775 per-venue average was the second best of 2022 for a limited release, behind Everything Everywhere All at Once ($50,130 in March). The film expanded to 1,283 theaters in its second weekend, and was projected to gross $2–3 million. It made $3.1 million, finishing eighth at the box office. Expanding to 2,541 theaters in its third weekend, the film made $2.6 million, finishing tenth. It made $1.1 million the next weekend, finishing fourteenth.

=== Critical response ===
On the review aggregator website Rotten Tomatoes, 85% of 239 critics' reviews are positive, with an average rating of 7.5/10. The website's consensus reads: "Impeccably cast and smartly written, Bodies Bodies Bodies is an uncommonly well-done whodunnit." Metacritic, which uses a weighted average, assigned the film a score of 69 out of 100, based on 43 critics, indicating "generally favorable" reviews. Audiences polled by PostTrak gave the film an average 3 out of 5 stars, with 63% saying they would definitely recommend it.

Abby Olcese for RogerEbert.com praised the use of music and cinematography to enhance the single-location setting. Bloody Disgusting found the social satire of the movie, and its use of setting to highlight this, to be strong. Lovia Gyarkye for The Hollywood Reporter found the film to be a psychological study of the friendship archetypes and the digital age, while also showing an understanding of the anxieties of twenty-somethings, praising the story. IndieWire's Robert Daniels wrote that Reijn's direction was the strongest part of the film, while also praising the script for its social interrogation. Erin Brady of Little White Lies instead thought that the film fell apart towards the end because it is "a movie that claims to understand how Gen-Z treats societal topics ... [while] portraying some of those topics so stereotypically." However, she said that the film was well paced and it was hard to resist the fun of it. IGN's Rafael Motamayor wrote that "it does falter somewhat when it comes to Gen Z talk ... like someone had a bunch of placeholders they swapped in with whatever term a teenager told them kids use these days," though also felt it was good overall.

Valerie Complex at Deadline Hollywood praised the cast, saying "each actor [has] their own style that brings a varied flavor to the film, which makes the cast ... a joy to watch, even if their characters are insufferable," and Owen Gleiberman for Variety praised the directing for giving the characters and actors room to explore. Complex and Daniels said that the characters as written are weak, but the performances all elevate them. Critics had broadly different views on who the standout performance was delivered by. Brady said this was Myha'la's. Gyarkye wrote that nobody could deny the acting talent, noting Myha'la as well as Stenberg. Daniels highlighted Davidson, while Marya E. Gates of The Playlist commended the ensemble while noting Davidson and Bakalova. Paste's Aurora Amidon felt that the cast were all successful, but that Bakalova's comedic talents were wasted by playing a serious character.

Gleiberman described the film as "And Then There Were None staged by John Cassavetes for the age of Instagram." Gates felt that some scenes ran too long, but said that the film is "destined to [take] its place on the mantle with seminal horror-comedy faves like Jennifer's Body and Scream"; Gyarkye instead said that the film may not appeal to slasher genre fans. Eileen Jones of Jacobin gave a negative review of the film, summarizing: "Like so many horror films attempting to be subversive, Bodies Bodies Bodies tries to satirize the upper class. But all it delivers are tired, lazy tropes about Gen Z."

=== Controversy ===
Bodies Bodies Bodies was the subject of controversy online following a review published in The New York Times by Lena Wilson that criticized the film's sexuality. "Young, hot people get trapped in a remote locale and are picked off one by one. The hotties in question are a group of twenty-somethings embittered by lifelong friendship," Wilson wrote. She continued, "The only thing that really sets Bodies Bodies Bodies apart is its place in the A24 hype machine, where it doubles as a 95-minute advertisement for cleavage and Charli XCX's latest single." Stenberg sent the critic a direct message on Instagram, saying, "Your review was great. Maybe if you had gotten your eyes off my tits you would've watched the movie!" Wilson posted a screenshot of the interaction, featuring her response to Stenberg as well, on her Twitter account. "Do you think she instagram DM'd Alison Willmore, Justin Chang, and Anthony Lane like this or," she wrote in her tweet.

The tweet generated backlash on Twitter against both Stenberg and Wilson. On her TikTok, Wilson, who identifies as a lesbian, further criticized Stenberg's response, accusing her of homophobia. Stenberg said on her own TikTok account that she was only trying to be funny and ask an earnest question in private, which she did not expect to be aired in public. Stenberg also said that Wilson's comment aligned with comments Stenberg had heard about her own body: "It's quite surprising the amount of commentary I receive on my boobs. I wore this tank top in this movie because me and the costume designer felt it fit the character well. I do get tired of people talking about my chest. There seems to be a lot of unwarranted conversation about my chest." Wilson deleted her Twitter and TikTok accounts shortly after her tweet went viral.
