= Mia Barron =

American actress

- Born: Toronto, Canada
- Education: New York University (BFA, MFA)
- Spouse: Lars Jan

Mia Barron is an American actress. She won the Lucille Lortel Award (Best Featured Performance in a play) for her performance in the Lincoln Center production of The Coast Starlight, an Obie award for her performance in Hurricane Diane at New York Theatre Workshop, as well as a second Obie and a Drama Desk Award for her work in the ensemble of the Off Broadway production of The Wolves. She co-created, along with director Lars Jan, a theatrical adaptation of Joan Didion's The White Album, which premiered in New York to sold out houses at BAM's Harvey Theatre as part of the Next Wave Festival. She is known for her extensive New York City theater credits, alongside her television and independent film work, most recently Half Empty Half Full, which received a New York Film Award nomination for Best Ensemble. She is also known as the voice of Molotov and Sally Impossible on the Cartoon Network's long-running comic science-fiction series, The Venture Bros.

== Early life ==
Mia Barron was born in Toronto and raised in Brookline, Massachusetts, the daughter of psychologist James Barron and writer Susan Barron. Her parents divorced and she has two brothers from her father's second marriage. Barron moved to New York to get her BFA at the Tisch School of the Arts and stayed to get her MFA from the graduate acting program at Tisch.

When she first got out of school, Barron worked extensively in regional theatre appearing in multiple shows at The Long Wharf, The Guthrie, The Old Globe, Huntington Theatre, New York Stage and Film, Berkshire Theatre Festival, Williamstown Theatre Festival, Westport Playhouse, Actors Theatre of Louisville's Humana festival, and The Acting Company among others. After she settled in New York, Barron became a mainstay in the off-Broadway scene, often working on the premieres of new plays.

== Career ==
Barron's television credits include a recurring role on Get Shorty (with Chris O'Dowd and Ray Romano), a recurring role on Law & Order True Crime (opposite to Edie Falco) and the recurring role of Katrina Griffin on NCIS.

Barron was in the off-Broadway production of Sarah Delappe's The Wolves, named one of the best productions of the year by The New York Times, and by Forbes magazine as "a milestone for women in entertainment." Barron was in the Broadway production of Tom Stoppard's Tony-winning Coast of Utopia, alongside Billy Crudup and Ethan Hawke. Barron was in the New York premieres of Pulitzer-winning writer Bruce Norris's The Pain and the Itch at Playwrights Horizons, and Domesticated at Lincoln Center Theater, alongside Jeff Goldblum and Laurie Metcalf. She has also been heavily involved with Chekhov Project at Lake Lucille, having appeared as Elena opposite Bill Irwin's Vanya, and Natasha opposite Michael Chernus's Andrey.

Barron moved to Los Angeles, where she has become a regular on television and in the independent film world, as well as continuing her work in the New York theatre world.

== Awards ==
- Lortel Award - Outstanding Featured Performer in a Play (The Coast Starlight)
- Obie Award - Outstanding Performance (Hurricane Diane)
- Obie Award - Outstanding Ensemble (The Wolves)
- Drama Desk Award Outstanding Ensemble (The Wolves)
- Audie Awards Finalist (Female Narration for Crosstalk)
- Best Ensemble Nomination New York Film Awards (Half Empty/Half Full)

== Personal life ==
Barron has one child, Esme, with her partner multi-media artist Lars Jan.

== Credits ==
=== Stage ===
Year	Title	Theater
2002	The World Over	Playwrights Horizons
2003	She Stoops to Comedy	Playwrights Horizons
2005	Big Times	Soho Repertory Theatre
2006	The Pain and the Itch	Playwrights Horizons
2006-2007	The Coast of Utopia	Lincoln Center
2009	What Once We Felt	Lincoln Center
2010	Spirit Control	Manhattan Theatre Club
2011	Knickerbocker	The Public Theater
2013	Domesticated	Lincoln Center
2015	Dying For It	Atlantic Theater Company
2017	The Wolves	Lincoln Center
2019	Hurricane Diane	New York Theatre Workshop
2023	The Coast Starlight	Lincoln Center
2025	Dakar 2000	Manhattan Theatre Club
2025	Eureka Day	Pasadena Playhouse

=== Film and television ===
Year	Title	Role
2004-2015	The Venture Bros.	Molotov Cocktease and Sally Impossible
2008	Righteous Kill	Jill Goldman
2008	27 Dresses	
2010	Grey's Anatomy	Lauren Turner
2013	Elementary	Lara Banin
2014	Amnesiac	Officer Rogers
2014	Blue Bloods	Janet Walters
2015	The Impossibilities	Marlene
2015	I Smile Back	Susan
2016	Modern Family	Vicky
2016	Bones	Gail Bradford
2016	NCIS	Doctor Katrina Griffin
2017	Law & Order True Crime	Marcia
2018	Get Shorty	Emily
