= Kimberly Barzola =

Peruvian-American artist and activist

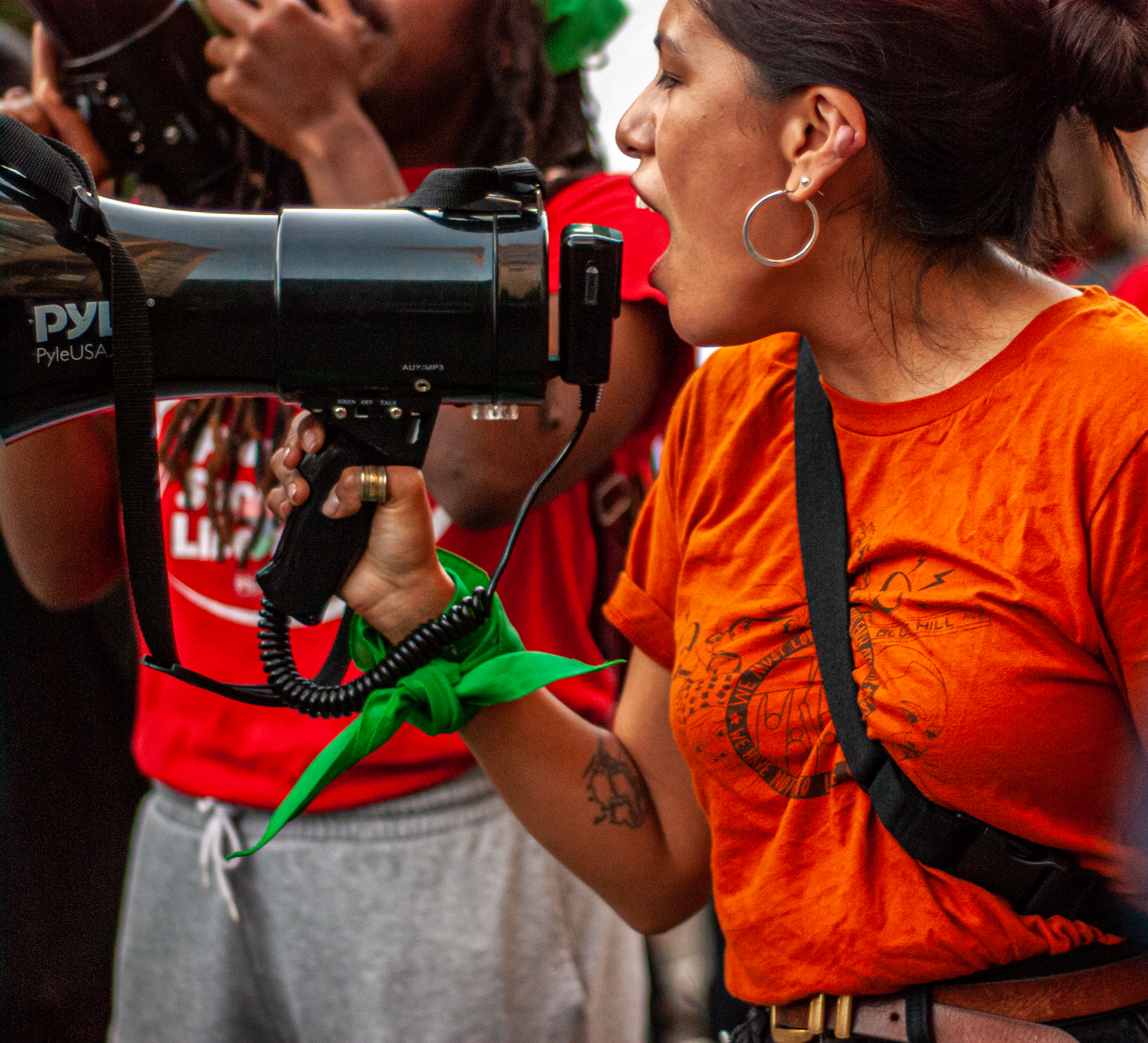
Barzola speaking at a reproductive justice rally in Boston in 2022.

Kimberly Barzola is a socialist artist and multilingual organizer from Salem, Massachusetts.

== Artwork ==
=== Murals ===
In 2019, Barzola painted a mural paying homage to the hard work of Latin American coffee farmers in Chelsea, MA.

She won a grant from the city of Boston to connect residents to nature and build community through a mural-making project in East Boston, as part of the series, Stories From the Garden.

In 2020, Barzola painted a mural at the Punto Urban Art Museum depicting Tupac Katari and Bartolina Sisa, two indigenous revolutionaries who fought for freedom in 18th-century Peru, where Barzola's family is from.

=== Printmaking ===
In 2020, Barzola's piece, Kawsachun Pachamama, was featured in an international Anti-Imperialist Poster Exhibition.

In 2021, Barzola was hired to make art that embodied environmental stewardship and social justice for the Living Landscapes Conference at Boston University.

Her print of Taghreed al-Barawi resisting during protests in Gaza was published in The Palestine Poster Project Archives.

In January 2022, US-based organization The People's Forum published an international collaborative exhibit: Líneas Vitales/Vital Lines, which brought the artwork of Cuban artists and US artists together to protest the United States embargo against Cuba. Barzola's work was featured, incorporating Che Guevara, and drawing inspiration from socialist futures.

Barzola has also collaborated with The People's Forum with art to support Haitian liberation.

In February 2022, Barzola's relief print was published in a Tricontinental interview with Héctor Béjar.

== Organizing ==
=== Anti-fascism and anti-militarism ===
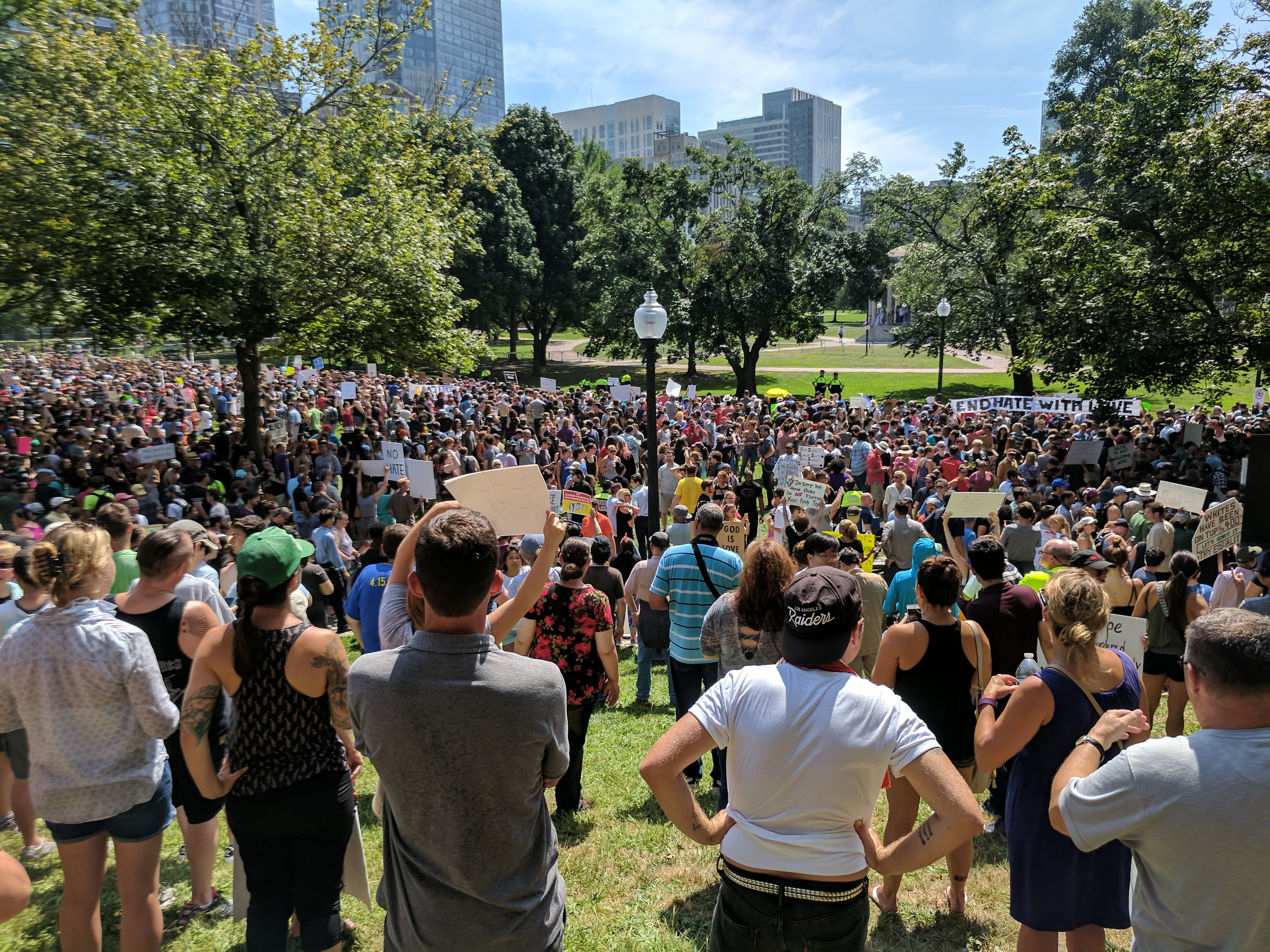
A section of the crowd at the 2017 counter-protest Barzola co-organized in Boston.

On August 19, 2017, approximately 40,000 people gathered in Boston Common to oppose white supremacists and fascists, presenting themselves as the “Boston Free Speech Coalition". Barzola co-organized the counter-rally and spoke to the crowd about the importance of ending US militarism abroad.

A member of A.N.S.W.E.R., Barzola has spoken at many demonstrations in opposition to military intervention. She has protested and photographed the presence of former Secretary of State Henry Kissinger and Jeffrey Epstein at the Massachusetts Institute of Technology, in solidarity with MIT Students Against the War.

=== Immigrant rights ===
Barzola often organizes around policies to support undocumented immigrants.

In November 2017, Barzola, an organizer for the T Riders Union, advocated for maintaining the option of cash payments for low-income and immigrant passengers whose immigration status prevents them from using a bank account or credit card.

She co-organized the Justice4Siham campaign to protest ICE's deportation of a single mother and community organizer, Siham Byah.

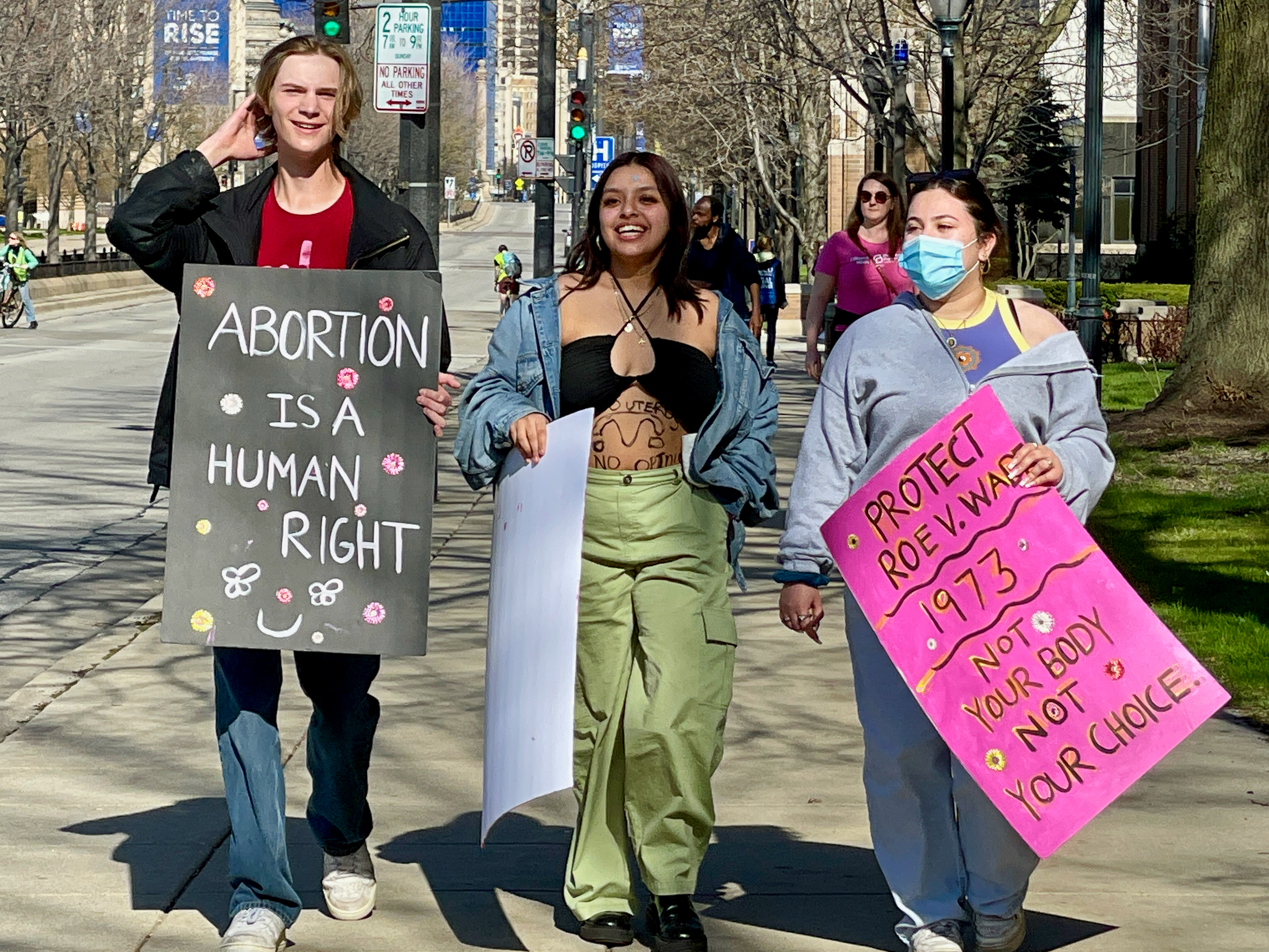
People gather to protest the Supreme Court's 2022 decision to overturn Roe v. Wade.

=== Palestinian freedom ===
In November 2015, Barzola was impeached from Boston University student government, along with colleague Marwa Sayed, due to alleged negligence of their duties. Some students opposed the motion, believing Barzola and Sayed were being punished for their support of and involvement in Students for Justice in Palestine.

=== Reproductive justice ===
In June 2022, following the Supreme Court’s decision to overturn Roe v. Wade, Barzola and fellow organizers with the Boston Liberation Center, led a crowd of thousands of protestors through the streets of Boston to the Massachusetts State House. Speaking to the crowd, Barzola stated, “We are going back to the roots of this movement by coming to the streets because we know that the only way we even got this right to begin with in 1973 was by mass mobilization."

=== Resources for Black and brown people ===
After Barzola's former high school, Nathaniel Bowditch School, was closed due to "underperformance", she wrote a letter criticizing the lack of funding towards the school, which predominately served students classified as "Hispanic".

Barzola fought alongside the I am Harriet Coalition, in an attempt to save the Harriet Tubman house, which was a community center and one of the last remaining representations of the Black community in the South End. The building was later demolished and the land was sold to developers to create luxury condominiums.

== Personal life ==
Barzola was born and raised in the North Shore of Massachusetts. She is of Quechua descent.
