= Adrian Ellis =

Adrian Ellis may refer to:

- Adrian Ellis (consultant) (born 1956), American consultant
- Adrian Ellis (composer), Canadian composer
