= Ran Dian =

Hong Kong-based international contemporary art magazine

- Categories: Art magazine
- Founder: Chris Moore, Daniel Szehin Ho, Rebecca Catching
- Founded: 2012
- First issue: 2010
- Company: China Art Times Limited (Hong Kong)
- Country: Hong Kong
- Language: English, Mandarin
- Website: randian-online.com

Ran Dian is a Hong Kong–based, international contemporary art magazine, published bilingually in English and Mandarin. It aims both to promote independent cultural debate in China and to foster intellectual exchange between China and the rest of the world. It focuses on independent commentary on international art, artists, exhibitions and galleries.

Ran Dian was launched in Shanghai, China in 2010 by Chris Moore, Daniel Szehin Ho and Rebecca Catching. According to Chris Moore, the magazine's international growth was driven by rising interest in East Asia on the part of the Western European art world.

== Editorial staff ==
- Dr Liang Shuhan, Editor-in-Chief
- Daniel Szehin Ho, Editor-at-Large
- Rebecca Catching, Managing Editor
- Thomas Eller, President
- Robin Peckham, Contributing Editor
- David Elliott, Contributing Editor
