= Holoscenes =

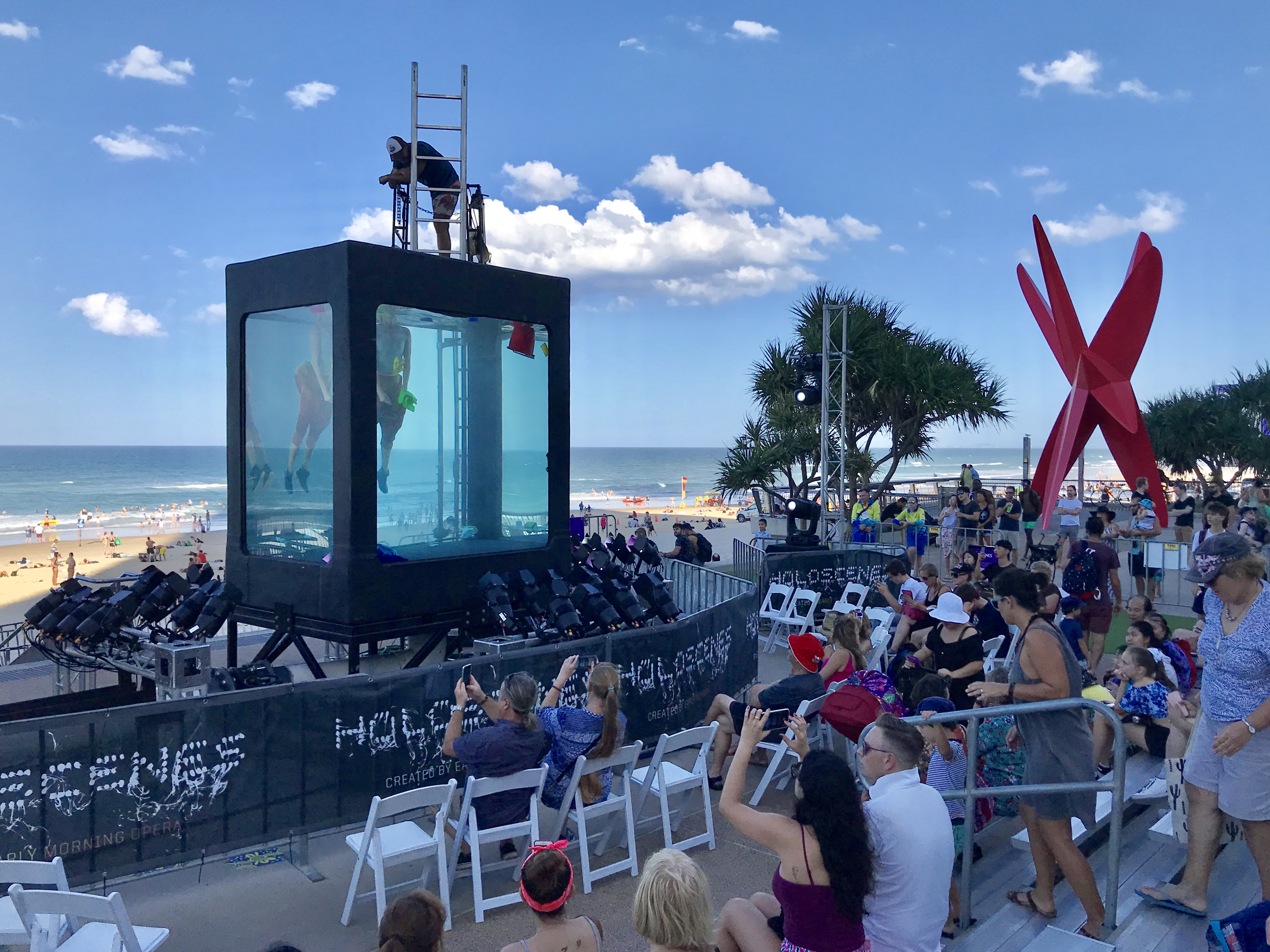
- Holoscenes performs in the Surfers Paradise, Queensland during 2018 Commonwealth Games
- Artist: Lars Jan
- Year: 21st century
- Medium: Installation art
- Subject: Climate change
- Website: http://earlymorningopera.com/wp/projects/holoscenes/

Holoscenes is a multi-format work of installation art by Los Angeles artist Lars Jan.

== Description ==
Holoscenes, features a single totemic, aquarium-like sculpture sited in public space, standing thirteen feet tall and viewable from 360 degrees.

In an allegory of the rising sea levels produced by climate change, the aquarium is animated by a powerful custom hydraulic system that pumps up to 15 tons of water in and out in less than a minute, creating a series of mini-floods to which the performers must adapt. Over the course of several hours, a series of performers play variously the guitar, sell fruit, don an abaya, uncoil a garden hose, and perform other familiar tasks as the water rises and falls around each in turn.

== Exhibitions ==
The piece has been shown/performed during The Commonwealth Games Festival 2018, Australia (2018); Times Square Arts & World Science Festival, New York (2017); Art Abu Dhabi NYU Abu Dhabi, UAE (2016); London's Burning Festival (2016); Art Basel, Miami Beach (2015); at the John and Mable Ringling Museum, Sarasota (2015); Nuit Blanche, Toronto (2014); at the Pasadena Museum of California Art (2015) and at Carrefour international de théâtre (2022).

== See also ==
- List of works of installation art
