= Bandits in Rome =

- French film poster
- Directed by: Alberto De Martino
- Screenplay by: Giacinto Ciaccio; Massimo D'Avack; Carlo Romano; Dino Maiuri; Massimo De Rita; Alberto De Martino; Fabio Carpi; Lianella Carell; Piero Tellini
- Story by: Giacinto Ciaccio; Massimo D'Avack; Carlo Romano
- Produced by: Dino de Laurentiis
- Starring: John Cassavetes; Gabriele Ferzetti; Anita Sanders; Nikos Kourkoulos
- Cinematography: Aldo Tonti
- Edited by: Otello Colangeli
- Music by: Ennio Morricone; Bruno Nicolai
- Production company: Dino de Laurentiis Cinematografica
- Distributed by: Paramount Pictures
- Release date: 20 November 1968 (Italy)
- Running time: 104 minutes
- Country: Italy
- Box office: ₤320.84 million

Bandits in Rome (Italian: Roma come Chicago, lit. 'Rome like Chicago') is a 1968 Italian crime film directed by Alberto De Martino. It stars John Cassavetes.

== Cast ==
- John Cassavetes as Mario Corda
- Gabriele Ferzetti as Commissioner
- Anita Sanders as Lea Corda
- Nikos Kourkoulos as Enrico
- Riccardo Cucciolla as Vice-Commissioner Pascuttini
- Luigi Pistilli as Colangeli
- Osvaldo Ruggieri as Inspector Sernesi
- Guido Lollobrigida as Angelo Scotese
- Piero Morgia as Carlo Taddei
- Marc Fiorini as Luciano Tarquini

== Production ==
Among the films crew is cinematographer Aldo Tonto who had worked with Federico Fellini and Roberto Rossellini. The score was composed by Ennio Morricone and Bruno Nicolai. Morricone and Nicolai's score was re-worked music from the 1968 TV show Musica da sera. Alberto De Martino spoke about working with John Cassavetes, stating that he was "the most difficult actor I have ever worked with. When we first met, his wife Gena Rowlands came too. He introduced me to her as "the most intelligent director in Europe" which she responded with "Give him time!" Both De Martino and Cassavetes argued on the set but according to De Martino, the two ended production on good terms.

Bandits in Rome was shot at De Laurentiis studios and on location in Rome. Director Alberto De Martino discussed the film's location as an "Americanized Rome".

== Release ==
Bandits in Rome was released in Italy on 20 November 1968 where it was distributed by Paramount – De Laurentiis. It grossed a total of 320.84 million lira on its theatrical run in Italy. As of 2013, the film has not been released on home video.

== Reception ==
A review in the Monthly Film Bulletin stated that the film was a "fairly literal imitation of the American location thrillers of the Forties and Fifties made by Hathaway, Siodmak and others, except that it is a little more calculated in its violence."

== See also ==
- John Cassavetes filmography
- List of crime films of the 1960s
- List of Italian films of 1968

== Notes ==
=== References ===
- Curti, Roberto (2013). Italian Crime Filmography, 1968-1980. McFarland. ISBN 978-0786469765.
