= Robin Peckham =

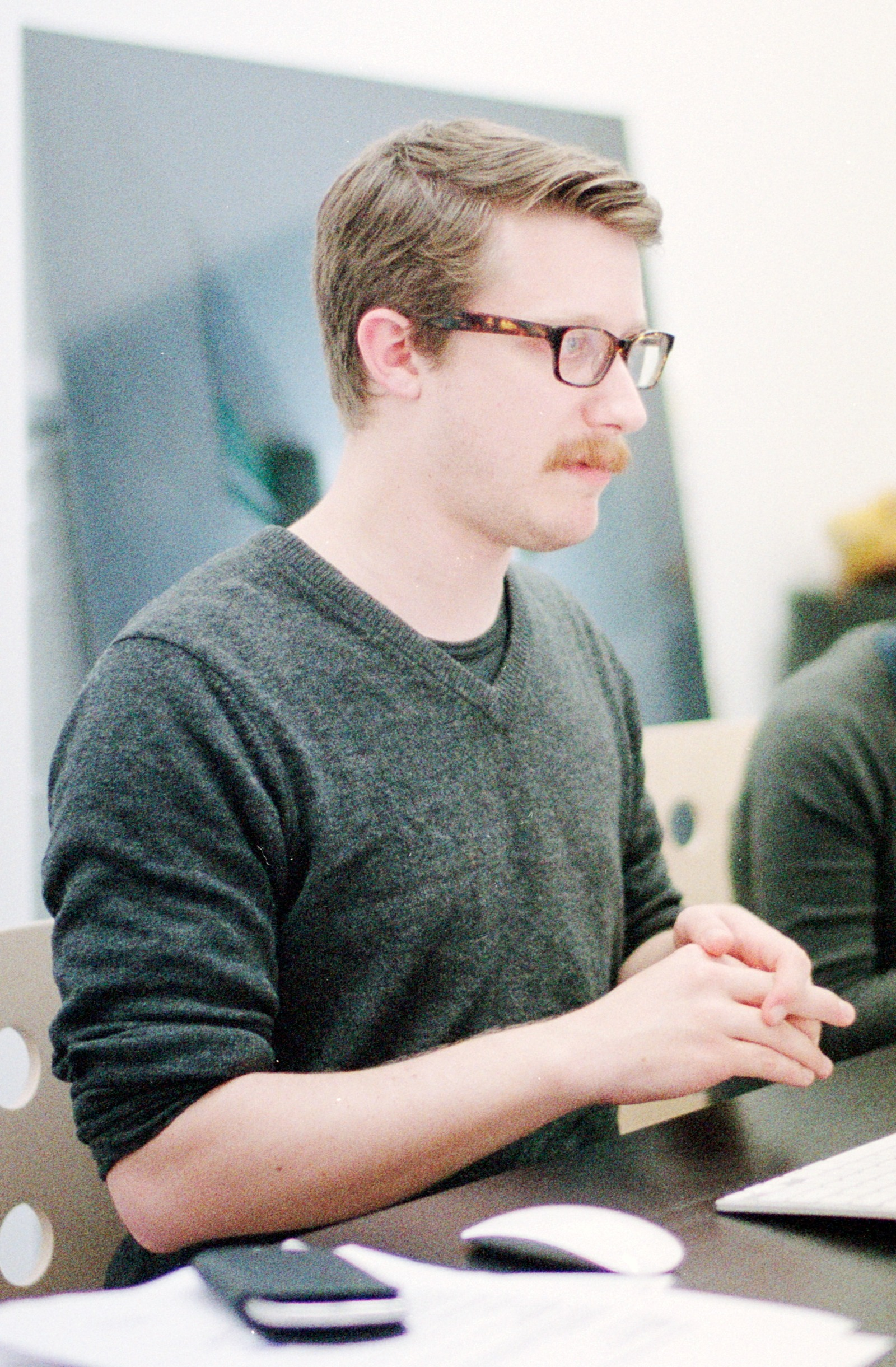
- Occupation(s): arts writer, gallerist and curator

Robin Peckham is an arts writer, gallerist and curator based in Hong Kong. In 2011, Peckham founded the Saamlung Gallery in Hong Kong, which closed two years later. He is the youngest exhibitor to be included in the Art Futures portion of the 2012 Hong Kong International Art Fair and has been featured as one of today's top young Chinese arts professionals.

== Biography ==
He studied Modern Culture and Media at Brown University and Media Art Histories at Danube University Krems. Peckam has worked as director of Boers-Li gallery in Beijing, curator for Hong Kong-based curatorial office Kunsthalle Kowloon, and project associate to the Long March Space, one of Beijing’s first non-profit art platforms. In 2008, he created the Society for Experimental Cultural Production, a curatorial office and editorial team.

== Saamlung ==
Peckham's Saamlung Gallery opened in 2011 and was lauded as one of the best up-and-coming galleries in Hong Kong. The gallery presented work by emerging and historically significant artists from greater China and around the world through solo projects, thematic group exhibitions, publications, and other satellite events. Shows staged included architectural drawings by Charles LaBelle, street calligraphy by the "King of Kowloon" Tsang Tsou Choi, and machinic light sculptures by Matt Hope. Other artists shown included Nadim Abbas, João Vasco Paiva, and Adrian Wong. The gallery closed in January 2013: "the quality of the local audience and collector base for the underexposed artists he championed had “failed to improve” and “even seemed to be weakening”.

== Writing and publications ==
Peckham's writing, translation, and editorial work is published in Artforum, Ran Dian, Pipeline, Yishu, LEAP, and ArtSlant, and recent book-length publications include monographs on Zhang Peili and MAP Office.
