= Adrian Wong (artist) =

- 王浩然
- Born: 1980 (age 45–46); Chicago, Illinois
- Education: Stanford University; Yale School of Art
- Website: www.adrianwong.info

Adrian Wong (born 1980 in Chicago, Illinois) is an artist based in Hong Kong and Los Angeles. Wong is the co-founder and director of the Embassy Projects art studio. Adrian Wong is a tenured Professor of Sculpture at the School of the Art Institute of Chicago (SAIC).

== Biography ==
Wong has a master's degree in research psychology from Stanford University and a master of fine arts from Yale. He teaches sculpture and critical theory at the University of California Los Angeles and Virginia Commonwealth University.

== Work ==
Wong's works consist of installations, videos and sculptures that draw from various subjects such as 1970s television shows and the artist's relationship to his environment, particularly Hong Kong. "The work that I tend to do is not so much abstract representational sculpture. I tend to make things as what they are. My first year in grad school, I spent a lot of time learning how to build boats," said Wong in TimeOut Hong Kong. The art critic Robin Peckham wrote, "The most significant aspect of his growing body of work is its willingness to play fast and loose with the hallowed if commonplace signifiers of culture and identity, loosening the binds between object and narrative, image and context in a way that contributes back to the parent culture even as it presents highly stylized and aestheticized (but never iconic) depictions of these visual styles to an imagined theatrical audience via a vaguely universal and totalizing sensibility." His work has been included at the Hong Kong Sculpture Biennial, Saamlung Gallery in 2012, Internationale Kurzfilmtage Oberhausen, Louis Vuitton Fondation pour la Création, Bangkok Experimental Film Festival, LOOP Media Art Center and Kunsthalle Wien.

In 2013, Absolut Art Bureau selected Wong to create a bar for Art Basel Hong Kong. Wong created "Wun Dun an Art Bar" that "revives, rekindles and re-imagines an older, more romantic Hong Kong of Suzy Wong, opera lounge singers and awkward waiters."

Wong was awarded the Daniel and Mildred Mendelowitz Memorial Fellowship for the Arts in 2003. He received the Videotage FUSE Fellowship in 2006, the AiR Association/Triangle Arts Trust Residency Programme in 2008 and Detour Design Exchange Tokyo in 2010. Wong won the Sovereign Asian Art Prize in 2013.

He teaches at UCLA Arts and Architecture Department.

Wong currently lives and works in Hong Kong.

== Selected exhibitions ==
2003

- Crosstown Traffic, John Slade Ely Center for Contemporary Art, New Haven, Conn., USA
- Teetering, Nathan Cummings Art Center, Stanford, Calif., USA

2004

- Adapt and Overcome!, Holcombe T. Green Gallery, New Haven, Conn., USA

2005

- Community Theater, ArtSpace Annex, New Haven, Conn., USA
- MFA Thesis Exhibition, Holcombe T. Green Gallery, New Haven, Conn., USA
- Monstrously Tranquil, Ingalls and Associates Gallery, Miami, Fla., USA

2006

- Fotanian 4, Wah-Luen Industrial Centre, Fo Tan, Hong Kong
- Sleepover Psychedelia, Kapok, Tin Hau, Hong Kong

2007

- Stable, Para/Site Art Space at Embassy Projects, Fo Tan, Hong Kong
- A Fear Is This: New Work by Adrian Wong, 1A Space, To Kwa Wan, Hong Kong
- Autobibliophiles, Studio Bibliothèque, Fo Tan, Hong Kong
- Moh Goh Yeung, Wan Goh Yeung, Sai Wan Ho Civic Centre, Sai Wan Ho, Hong Kong
- Perpetual Art Machine, Circa Art Fair, San Juan, Puerto Rico
- Dialogue With The Ghosts, Get It Louder, Guangzhou, China
- Ritual For The Ghosts, Para/Site Art Space, Sheung Wan, Hong Kong
- Reversing Horizons, Shanghai Museum of Contemporary Art, Shanghai, China
- Restore, October Contemporary, To Kwa Wan, Hong Kong
- 14QK, Para/site Art Space, Sheung Wan, Hong Kong
- Overseas Exhibition: Video Programme, Kubus, Munich, Germany

2008

- Fotanian 6, Wah-Luen Industrial Centre, Fo Tan, Hong Kong
- Dis Play, Para/Site Art Space, Sheung Wan, Hong Kong
- Anarchitecture Bananas, Artists’ Commune, To Kwa Wan, Hong Kong
- Bangkok Experimental Film Festival, Bangkok, Thailand
- A Tree Without Roots, Olympian City Plaza, Hung Hom, Hong Kong
- 4x4, Kowloon Technical College, Kowloon, Hong Kong
- Where the Lions Are, Sheung Wan Civic Centre, Sheung Wan, Hong Kong
- Hong Kong Sculpture Biennial, Hong Kong, Hong Kong
- Ten Workers, W.L. Projekt, Berlin, Germany
- Super Art Team HK: Hooray, 1A Space, To Kwa Wan, HHong Kong

2009

- A Passion for Creation, Louis Vuitton Fondation pour la Création, Hong Kong Art Museum, HHong Kong
- Video Programme, LOOP Media Center, Seoul, South Korea
- Video Programme, Kunstverein, Hamburg, Germany
- All You Need Is Love, Post Museum, Singapore
- This is Hong Kong, Chalk Horse Gallery, Sydney, Australia
- This is Hong Kong, Casa Asia, Barcelona, Spain
- Abstract Cabinet, East Side Gallery, Birmingham, UK
- Video Programme, IFA Gallery, Berlin, Germany
- Video Programme, MAP Office, Hong Kong, Hong Kong
- Pecha Kucha 8, Ambassadors of Design, Central, Hong Kong

2010

- This Is Hong Kong, Kuandu Museum of Art, Taipei, Taiwan
- A Box in the Theatre of the World, Hong Kong Jockey Club, Central, Hong Kong
- /Umbrellahead, I Will Find You (Theatrical Production), Fmr. Married Police Quarters, Central Hong Kong
- FAX, Drawing Center, New York, N.Y., USA
- Ursual Bickle Archiv Programme, Kunsthalle Vien, Vienna, Austria
- City as Play, Museum of Contemporary Art Tokyo (MOT), Tokyo, Japan
- Back to the Future?, Osage Soho, Central, Hong Kong
- Place, Meinblau e.V., Berlin, Germany
- Life, K11, Tsim Sha Tsui, Hong Kong
- 0 Budget, What If Space, Wan Chai, Hong Kong
- Not Guilty, Hong Kong Design Week, Victoria Prison, Central, Hong Kong
- Against Easy Listening, 1a Space, To Kwa Wan, Hong Kong
- The Butcher's Deluxe, Angela Li Gallery, Soho, Hong Kong
- Homemade from Hong Kong, SESC São Paulo, São Paulo, Brazil

2011

- The Border Show, Society for Experimental Cultural Production, Shenzhen, China
- International Short Film Festival Oberhausen, Oberhausen, Germany
- Double Happiness, Meet Factory, Prague, Czech Republic
- 39 Art Day 9, Asia Art Archive, Sheung Wan, Hong Kong
- Black Margarita (performance), Sotheby's, Hong Kong Convention & Exhibition Centre, Hong Kong
- Troglodyte See the Light (Redux), LTD Los Angeles, Hollywood, CA, USA
- Staged Fictions, Osage Kwun Tong, Kwun Tong, Hong Kong
- Writing Off the Wall, Art HK11, Hong Kong Convention & Exhibition Centre, Hong Kong
- Troglodyte See the Light, Osage Kwun Tong, Kwun Tong, Hong Kong

2016

- Chinese Whispers, Museum of Fine Arts Bern, Bern, Switzerland

== See also ==
- Nadim Abbas
- Robin Peckham
