= Global Cultural Districts Network =

Global Cultural Districts Network (GCDN)
- Founded: 2013
- Founder: Adrian Ellis
- Headquarters: London and New York
- Members: 50+

The Global Cultural Districts Network (GCDN) is a federation of global centers of arts and culture. Its members represent cities, cultural districts, and cultural institutions from around the world, including Australia, the United Kingdom, Canada, the United States, China, and Singapore.^{[14]}

== Convenings ==
GCDN members are invited to regular convenings to share emerging best practices, hear expert panels, and discuss the place of cultural precincts and complexes in urban policy, economic development, and related areas of public policy such as technology, travel and tourism.

Past GCDN meetings include:

- GCDN Annual Convening, Singapore – 2019
- GCDN Annual Convening, Dubai – 2018
- GCDN North American Regional Convening, Providence, Rhode Island – 2017
- GCDN Annual Convening, Barcelona, Spain – 2017
- GCDN Annual Convening, Brooklyn, New York – 2016
- GCDN Annual Convening, London, UK – 2015
- New Cities Summit, Jakarta, Indonesia – 2015.
- GCDN Members Convening, Montreal, Canada – 2015.
- New Cities Summit, Dallas, Texas – 2014.

== Research ==
GCDN regularly commissions and publishes academic research. Some of the network's publications include:

- The Social Impact of Cultural Districts (2019) – A study and report commissioned by the Global Cultural Districts Network (GCDN) and written by Professor Geoffrey Crossick.
- Governance Models of Cultural Districts (2018) – Research co-commissioned with the University of the Arts London and conducted by James Doeser and Anna Marazuela Kim.
- Beyond Concrete Barriers: Innovation in Urban Furniture and Security in Public Space (2018) – Research initiated by the Quartier des Spectacles Partnership and conducted by Jon Coaffee.
- Cultural Infrastructure Index (2016-2019) – Annual survey seeking to measure investment in capital projects in the cultural sector.
- Branding Cultural Districts and Destinations (2017) – Research co-commissioned with Future Places and directed by Juan Carlos Belloso.
