= Thomas Eller =

German visual artist and writer

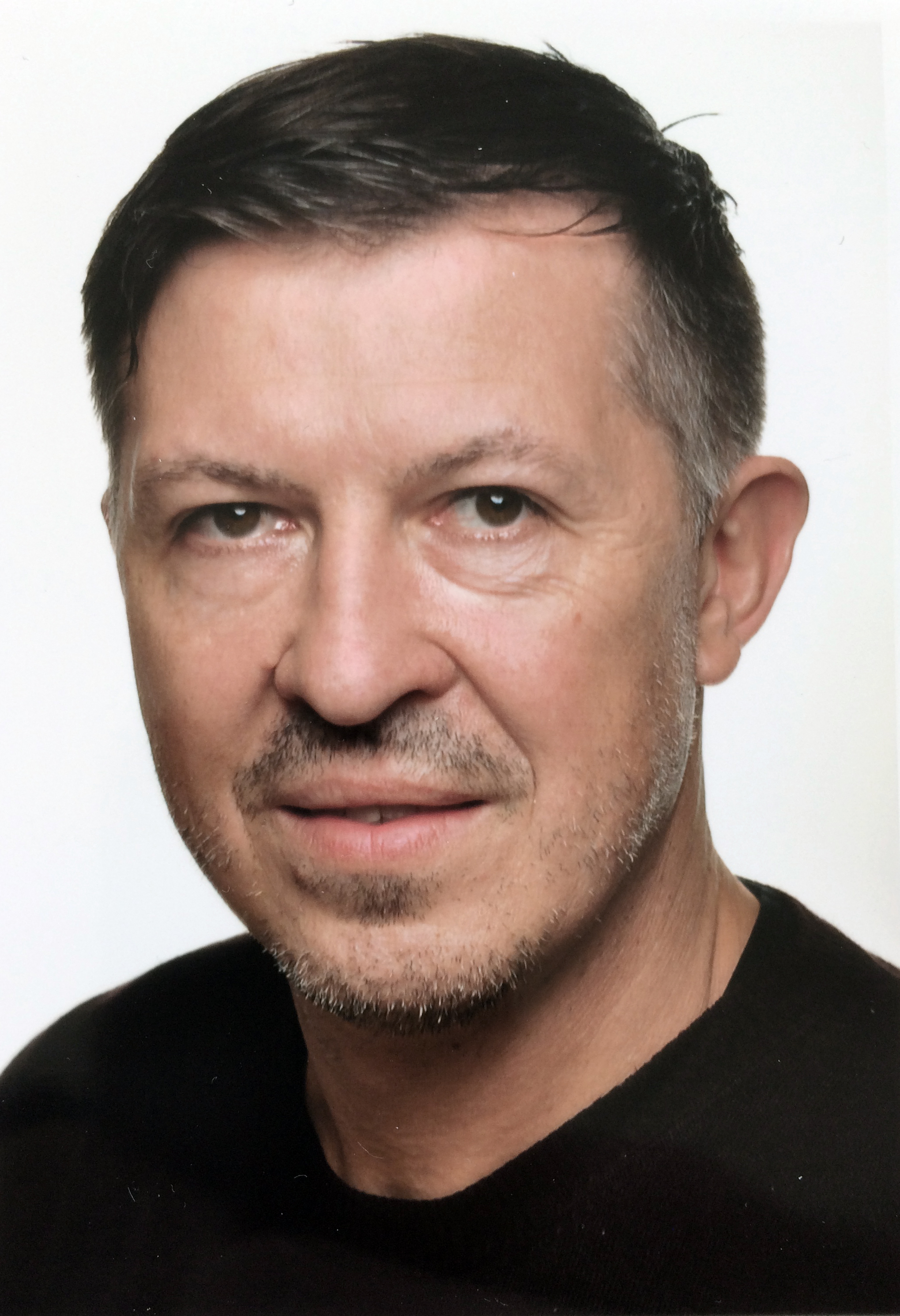
Thomas Eller in 2014

Thomas Eller (born 8 September 1964) is a German visual artist and writer. Born and raised in the German district of Franconia he left Nuremberg in 1985 to study fine art at the Berlin University of the Arts. After his forced dismission he studied sciences of religion, philosophy and art history at Free University of Berlin. During this time he was also working as a scientific assistant at the Science Center Berlin for Social Research (WZB).

From 1990 he exhibited extensively in European museums and galleries. In 1995 he obtained his green card and moved to New York City. Next he participated in exhibitions in museums and galleries in the Americas, Asia and Europe.

In 2004 he moved back to Germany and founded an online arts magazine on the internet platform artnet. As managing director he developed the Chinese business team and was instituting several cooperations e.g. with Art Basel and the Federal German Gallery Association (BVDG). In 2008 he became artistic director of Temporäre Kunsthalle Berlin on Schlossplatz at the heart of Berlin. He is now the President of Ran Dian, a Hong Kong–based, contemporary art magazine with a focus on Asia.

== The art ==
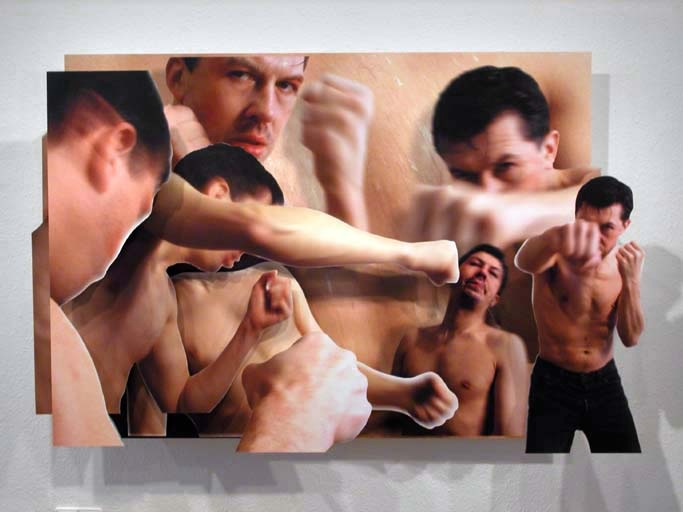
The objectile (sweat)

On a formal level Thomas Eller's art is concerned with the relationship between the second, third and fourth dimensions. His photo-sculptures are made from cut-out photographic prints laminated on aluminum that are hung in front of the wall, placed on the floor, or suspended in space by means of hidden constructions made from aluminum.

By cutting out photographed objects it is not the spatial context that is being removed, but the temporal. The reason being that the viewers perspective on an object is forever determined at the moment of release of the camera's shutter. According to Roland Barthes a photographic image is a window into the past. By cutting out an object, it is the temporal context that is being removed while the object is being placed into the "now" of the viewer's immediate sculptural perception. However, the photographic object manifests a spatial concept alien to the viewer's. For example: taking a photograph of an object form above will always result in an image with that perspective. If one takes this photo-object and places it over the viewer's head one makes the physical experience of looking up. This conflict of looking up and down at the same time can not be resolved, which constitutes the photo-objects as intermediaries between the two and three-dimensional realms. They could be appropriately described as apparitions.

In different work groups like THE bounty, or THE objectile Thomas Eller explores more complex temporal structures. Placing the same objects at different instances in time in juxtaposition but on different spatial levels the viewer is enabled to make an unusual visual experience. By focussing on different levels of the same object one at a time the spatial juxtaposition is being transformed into a temporal sequence, creating the experience of a "sculptural" video. It is only in the viewer's mind that the different spatial planes become sensical.

The artist calls this "Vision Beyond Photography": photography's physical and philosophical concepts are basically 600 years old. The camera essentially is central perspective become machine and therefore a pre-modern imaging medium. In his work the artist breaks with this limitation. Engaging the viewer in the visual constitution of the art works does not only assign a place for photography beyond the euclidean notion of space but, in a precarious switch of perspectives, makes the viewer the essential focus of the image.

== Awards ==
- 2006 Käthe Kollwitz Prize of the Academy of Arts, Berlin
- 2000 Villa Romana prize
- [http://www.studienstiftung.de/karl-schmidt-rottluff.html?user_config%5Bcmd%5D=showDetails&cHash=c34e7853c4447d90bf40a67758119d25 1996 [[Karl Schmidt-Rottluff Stipendium]]]]
