= David Elliott (curator) =

British curator (born 1949)

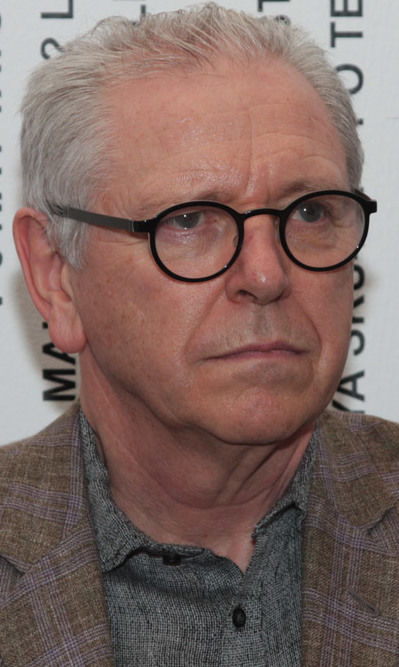
- Elliott in 2014
- Born: David Stuart Elliott; 29 April 1949 (age 77); England
- Education: Loughborough Grammar School; University of Durham; Courtauld Institute of Art
- Occupations: Art gallery and museum curator

David Stuart Elliott (born 29 April 1949) is a British art gallery and museum curator and writer on modern and contemporary art. He is also a Contributing Editor of Ran Dian magazine.

== Early life ==
Elliott was educated at Loughborough Grammar School. While studying Modern History at the University of Durham, he organised Germany in Ferment: Art and Society in Germany 1900–1933 (1970), a group of art, photography and design exhibitions that also included film and performance programmes. After showing in Durham, this travelled to the Mappin Art Gallery, Sheffield, and the Leicester Museum and Art Gallery. He then worked as an Art Assistant at the Leicester Museum and Art Gallery, before studying History of Art at the Courtauld Institute of Art.

== Career ==
Elliott worked as a regional art and exhibitions officer at the Arts Council of Great Britain, from 1973 to 1976 after which he served as director of the Museum of Modern Art, Oxford from 1976 to 1996. Elliott's programme at Oxford included exhibitions of art from Latin America, Asia, Africa, Eastern Europe and the Soviet Union as well as mainstream western art.

In 1995, he co-curated for the Hayward Gallery, London, a large traveling exhibition entitled Art and Power, exploring the relationship of art with the totalitarian regimes in Europe in the first half of the 20th century. His catalogue essays for this were gathered together and republished in History Today.

He was then Director of the Moderna Museet (Museum of Modern Art) in Stockholm from 1996 to 2001. From 1998 to 2004, he was President of CIMAM (The International Committee of ICOM for Museums of Modern and Contemporary Art). Between 2001 and 2006, Elliott was the first director of Tokyo's Mori Art Museum, a large privately endowed museum devoted to contemporary – particularly Asian – art, architecture and design.

During 2007, he was the first Director of Istanbul Modern. In 2008, Elliott was Rudolf Arnheim Guest Professor in the History of Art at the Humboldt University of Berlin, and a visiting professor in Curatorship and Museum Studies at the Chinese University in Hong Kong until 2015.

In 2010, he delivered the Toshiba Lecture Series, Rethinking Art after the Age of "Enlightenment", at the British Museum in London.

From 2008 to 2010, he was Artistic Director for the 17th Biennale of Sydney, THE BEAUTY OF DISTANCE: Songs of Survival in a Precarious Age, which took place 12 May–1 August 2010.

From 2011 to 2012, he was Artistic Director of the 1st Kyiv International Biennial of Contemporary Art entitled The Best of Times, The Worst of Times. Rebirth and Apocalypse in Contemporary Art.

From 2013 to 2014, he was Artistic Director of the IV Moscow Biennale of Young Art A TIME FOR DREAMS. From 2015 to 2016, he was Artistic Director of the 56th October Salon in Belgrade entitled The Pleasure of Love.

His exhibition Bye Bye Kitty!!! Between heaven and hell in contemporary Japanese art, opened at Japan Society, New York in March 2011 and was judged by the American Branch of the International Association of Art Critics [AAICA] as 'the best exhibition in a non-profit or public space in 2011'.

Between Heaven & Earth. Contemporary Art from the Centre of Asia was shown at Calvert 22, London, from September to November 2011.

From 2010 to 2012, Elliott was advising the Hong Kong Jockey Club Charitable Trust on the artistic development and programming of Tai Kwun, the Central Police Station Heritage site in Hong Kong. From 2010 to 2016, he was Chairman of the Board of the Triangle Arts Trust at Gasworks in London. From 2011 to 2017, he was on the jury of Kulturakademie Tarabya in Istanbul a residence scheme for artists of all kinds initiated by the German government to foster German-Turkish cultural exchange. Since 2010, he has been Chair of Judges of the Sovereign Asian Arts Prize in Hong Kong and Chair of the Advisory Board of MOMENTUM, Berlin. From 2015 to 2019, he was senior curator and vice-director to the Redtory Museum of Contemporary Art in Guangzhou.From 2018 to 2021 he was advisor and curator at the Troy House Art Foundation in London. In 2021 his book of collected essays Art & Trousers. Tradition and Modernity in Contemporary Asian Artwas published by Art AsiaPacific and the Singapore UP.

== Exhibitions ==
David Elliott has conceived and curated a large number of exhibitions including:

- Art and Power: Europe under the dictators 1933–1945 (1995);
- Wounds: between democracy and redemption in contemporary art (1998); (with Pier Luigi Tazzi)
- After the Wall: art and culture in post-Communist Europe (1999);
- Organising Freedom: Nordic art in the '90s (2000);
- Tokyo Young Artists' Video Initiative (2001);
- Absences (2002);
- Happiness: a survival guide for art and life (2003);
- Africa Remix: the contemporary art of a continent (2004); (with Simon Njami)
- Ilya and Emilia Kabakov, Where is Our Place? (2004);
- Follow Me! Chinese Art at the Turn of the Millennium and Hiroshi Sugimoto (2005);
- Tokyo Berlin/Berlin Tokyo, Mori Art Museum, Tokyo, and Neue Nationalgalerie, Berlin (2005);
- Hatsu-yume [First Dream]: the video art of Bill Viola (2006);
- From Ottoman Empire to Turkish Republic: modernity at a time of change (2007);
- Time Past, Time Present: 20 years of the Istanbul Biennial (2007);
- The Quick and the Dead: Rites of passage in art, spirit and life (2009);
- Bye Bye Kitty!!! Between Heaven and Hell in Contemporary Japanese Art (2011);
- Between Heaven and Earth: contemporary art from the centre of Asia (2011);
- Art From Elsewhere: International Contemporary Art from UK galleries (2014–16);
- BALAGAN!!! Contemporary Art from the Former Soviet Union and Other Mythical Places (2015);
- Social Fabric: New Work by Mariana Hahn and Kwan Sheung Chi (2016);
- Shen Shaomin: There is No Problem! (2016);
- The Pleasure of Love: Transient emotion in contemporary art (2016);
- Bread & Roses: Four Generations of Kazakh Women artists (2018);
- Connections and Fractures. Works from the RMCA Collection (2019);
- In the Shadows of Paradise; Chinese video art at the turn of the century (2021);
- Landscapes of Futures Past (2025);
- Remembrance; a tribute to the work of Dinh Q. Lê (2026).
