= Hurricane party =

Social event

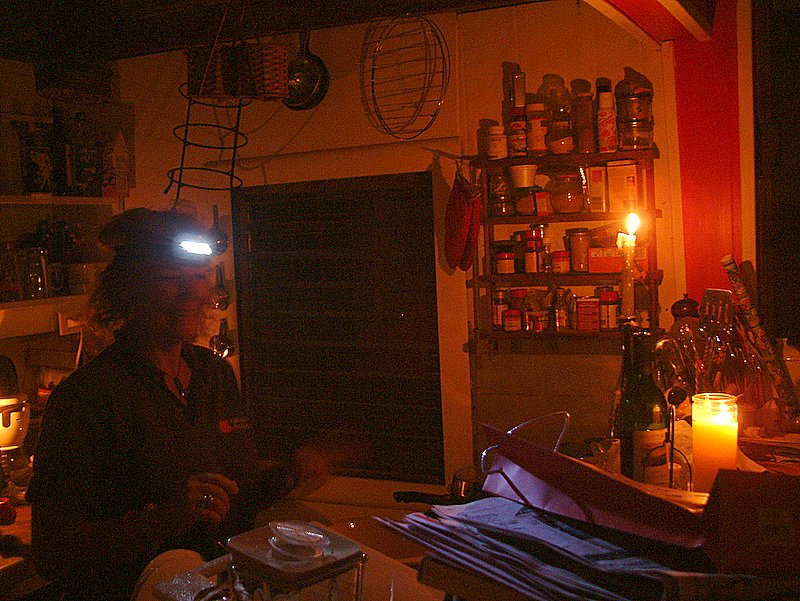
Candles and torches at a hurricane party during Hurricane Wilma, Key West, 2005

A hurricane party is a social event held by people primarily in the Southeastern United States in advance of an approaching Atlantic hurricane. Guests are typically allowed to stay with the host for three to five days (weather permitting) and, in return, bring hurricane supplies such as radios, first aid supplies, food, etc.

== Background ==
Hurricane parties started among people living in the Southern United States, especially in Florida. Events are held by people who cannot or choose not to evacuate during a hurricane warning, or when no evacuation orders are issued. Hosts may also lack hurricane supplies and therefore invite others to stay with them so as to share supplies and company. However, these events are usually more centered on the social aspect of the event.

Another rationale for hosting hurricane parties is the expectation that power service may be lost for days or even weeks. As a result, most perishable items, particularly frozen meats, will surely be wasted after the storm. In order to make good use of these items, grilling is an important aspect of many hurricane parties, as a way of "cleaning out the freezer".

== Party supplies and customs ==
Hurricane parties are designed for many individuals to pool resources with the expectation that there will be no electricity and no open stores or restaurants for several days. Following hurricanes, there is generally a curfew set by local police to reduce looting and crime when resources are already stretched thin. The hurricane party means that people do not have to worry about traveling when roads and transportation will be impassable. The hurricane party frequently aims to go through perishable food, and thus grilling is a common activity since grills can be used regardless of the status of electric utilities.

Alcohol is almost always in good supply at a hurricane party, but guests are advised to pace themselves since these parties are often multi-day events. Officials advise against drinking alcohol because people need to be alert during a disaster. Hurricane parties started with the availability of reliable forecasts and mass communications, which coincided with the repeal of prohibition.

== Cultural influence ==
- Cowboy Mouth recorded the song "Hurricane Party" about the excesses of a particular hurricane party for their 1999 live album All You Need is Live.
- James McMurtry has a song entitled "Hurricane Party", in which he covers events that occur during and after a storm, on his album Just Us Kids.
- The majority of the 2022 film Bodies Bodies Bodies takes place during a hurricane party, with consequences of the storm driving the plotline.
- A 1989 episode of Nova claimed that during Hurricane Camille, a hurricane party was held at Richelieu Manor Apartments in Pass Christian, Mississippi in which 23 of 24 attendants died. No such party occurred, but eight people from the apartments died and the entire building was destroyed.
