= Lars Jan =

American multidisciplinary artist

- Born: 1978 (age 47–48); Cambridge, Massachusetts
- Education: MFA in directing and integrated media from California Institute of the Arts (2008); BA from Swarthmore College (2000)
- Known for: Performance; Photography; Print Media; Sculpture; Single and multi-channel video Installations; Writing
- Notable work: Holoscenes (2014–Present); The White Album (2018–2020); Slow-Moving Luminaries (2017); The Institute of Memory (TIMe) (2015 — 2019)
- Spouse: Mia Barron
- Website: http://earlymorningopera.com/

Lars Jan (born 1978) is a Los Angeles–based director and multidisciplinary artist, whose practice spans performance, photography, print media, sculpture, single and multi-channel video works, installations, and writing. His original works have been presented by The Whitney Museum of American Art, Sundance Film Festival, and theaters and festivals around the world. He is a faculty member at California Institute of the Arts' School of Theater, a TED Senior Fellow, and a New Frontiers Story Lab advisor at the Sundance Institute. Jan is the founder and artistic director of Early Morning Opera, an art lab that creates large-scale works "exploring emerging technologies, live audiences, and unclassifiable experience." As a visual artist, he is represented by Charlie James Gallery in Los Angeles.

== Life and influences ==
Lars Jan was born in Cambridge, Massachusetts to émigré parents: an Afghan mother—Razia Jan—and Polish father. He received a BA from Swarthmore College in 2000, and graduated from CalArts with an MFA in directing and integrated media in 2008. Jan's artistic interest started at age 12, when he began taking infrared black and white photographs. After graduating college, Jan spent a year in Japan studying bunraku puppetry. Jan lived and worked in Philadelphia and New York before moving to California in 2005.

Water and environmental issues are prominent themes in his art practice. Jan is influenced by California Light and Space Movement artists Robert Irwin, James Turrell, and Doug Wheeler. "They're playing with perception and they're interested in the eye as an apparatus that connects to the brain and processes information in a very particular way," Jan notes. "The eye can be manipulated. Reality can be adjusted." He applies the artists' concept of light to his own work, pivoting instead to a focus on water, as seen in Holoscenes and Slow-Moving Luminaries.

Jan creates "genre-bending" work reflecting his "background in progressive activism." "I see potential for the arts acting less as a field unto itself, but more as a circulatory fluid connecting and feeding the progress of all fields," says Jan. Jan has called creative thinking and artistic practice "revolutionary tools, healing tools."

== Work ==
=== Paul Abacus (2011–2014) ===
Paul Abacus was a fictional character dating from 2011 performed by Jan. According to Jan's press release, Paul Abacus "is an invention, a persona created by real-life performance artist Lars Jan and his production company, Early Morning Opera, whose works have been commissioned by the Experimental Media and Performing Arts Center, Symphony Space, REDCAT, and the Whitney Museum of American Art."

In October 2010, ABACUS premiered at the inaugural Filament festival at the Experimental Media and Performing Arts Center (EMPAC) in Troy, New York. In September 2011, it was announced that "Paul" was invited to give his presentation in the "New Frontier" program at the 2012 Sundance Film Festival in Park City, Utah to be followed by a series of lectures at REDCAT in Los Angeles in February 2012. In 2014 the Brooklyn Academy of Music (BAM) invited Abacus to share his presentation for the first time on the East Coast of the United States as part of the fall Next Wave Festival.

The show drew inspiration from the work of polymath R. Buckminster Fuller.

=== Holoscenes (Since 2014) ===
Holoscenes is a performance and installation that takes place in a 12-ton glass aquarium in public space. Holoscenes first premiered in Toronto's Nuit Blanche festival in 2014, and has since been shown around the world including in Miami, Sarasota, London, Abu Dhabi, Australia's Gold Coast, and New York's Times Square.

In this aquarium, performers attempt to carry out daily tasks submitted by people in over 40 countries—including making a bed, reading the newspaper, selling fruit, cleaning windows, and coiling a garden hose—as the tank fills with water in as little as one minute, and drains, multiple times during the performance, simulating a flash flood. Performer Geoff Sobelle told The New York Times, "in all of these situations you feel yourself adapt. There is a sense of surrendering."

According to Jan, the work was inspired by the images of floods around the world, and the idea that the earth is currently entering a new geologic epoch—the Anthropocene—which labels the current period in history as the first time the planet has been shaped by a living species. Conditions that some scientists point out in a defense of usage of the term includes rising CO_{2} levels and seas, and mass extinction. Jan says he wants viewers to "feel climate change in their guts, rather than just understand it." The name of the work refers to the Holocene epoch, which began after the last major ice age, 11,700 years ago, and in which some scientists argue that we are currently still living.

His Holoscenes 3-channel video installation was included in the group exhibition, "'Till Its Gone," at the Istanbul Modern in 2016. The work was also adapted as a spherical film in 2019, which premiered at the University of Colorado's Boulder Planetarium, displaying on six-foot diameter screens as part of a Science On a Sphere installation. The film, entitled Holoscenes/Tiny Boxes, displays 6-minutes of footage based on the original live performances along with scientific facts, charts, and graphs. The work was also shown on screens in the Geneva Conference Center during an event in 2018 organized by the UN Refugee agency and International Council of Voluntary Agencies, involving over 300 government officials from 90 countries.

=== The White Album (2018–2020) ===
Jan adapted Joan Didion's essay, The White Album, into a performance work which was co-commissioned by the Brooklyn Academy of Music (BAM) and Center Theatre Group, as well as the International Festival of Firsts, where it premiered in October 2018. Since then, it has been also been performed at BAM, the Center for the Art of Performance at UCLA, the Wexner Center for the Arts, and The Sydney Festival. Jan received permission from Didion to use her words in his work.

The performance of The White Album largely unfolds within a white sound-proofed room that has one entire wall made of plexiglass panels. Viewers consist of two audience groups: about twenty college-age adults referred to as the "inner audience," and a generally older group of seated audience members, many of whom lived through the protests and political movements of late 1960s America that Didion describes in her essay. The younger audience become both viewers and participants of the events within the cube, as the seated audience watch everything unfold on stage and observe actor Mia Barron perform Didion's essay verbatim—creating what Jan calls "multiple levels of spectator experience." At the conclusion of the performance, audience members of both groups are encouraged to discuss what they saw and what these events held for the future in a Quaker-style open forum. Of the production, Jan said "I want to know what can actually be transferred from the past to the present that can be a tool that we use to interrogate the most vital questions that were raised in 1968 and continue today."

In a review for the Los Angeles Times, theater critic Charles McNulty noted that The White Album had "an air of openness and informality [that] was integral to the production, but sometimes the exploratory vibe came across as tentative and unfinished."

=== Slow-Moving Luminaries (2017) ===
Lars Jan created Slow-Moving Luminaries for Art Basel in Miami Beach in 2017. The project was commissioned by Swiss watchmakers, Audemars Piguet, who called for time-based art that portrayed "tension between tradition and innovation" as well as precision and complexity. Alluding to the hurricanes that frequent the Miami coast and tides affected by celestial movements, as well as Japanese rock gardens and Angkor Wat, the work, Jans says, is both a foreboding commentary about climate change and a space for contemplation. Kathleen Forde, the curator of the Audemars Piguet Art Commission that year, writes that Slow-Moving Luminaries evokes "the passage of time, ephemerality, the blurring between built and wild landscapes, as well as responding to its immediate surroundings while raising universal concerns about our future."

The installation was contained within a two-story pavilion on the beach, against the South Beach skyline. Within the first level, audience members walked through a labyrinth garden, with a path spelling out S-O-S delineated by scrim walls. As visitors move around the space, kinetic sculptures, resembling architecture seen on the skyline, ascend and descend through an opening in the ceiling on a cycle determined by an algorithm. Backlit photographs and video show the same structures becoming engulfed and disappearing into violent waves. Jan says, "I can't help recognizing that some of what we build will be covered by the jungle, and the rest by the sea, that our constructions are only ephemerally ours, and that the agent of ephemerality can be a violent one." A staircase leads to a second level with a reflecting pool, through which the sculptural buildings protrude and recede back towards the ground floor. Two orange flags with the international maritime symbol for "SOS" rise above the pool. Jan considers the audience's participation in viewing and moving through the space as much part of the work as the structure itself, saying "How the viewers gather and focus, the patterns that emerge in terms of the choreography of bodies, and also how voices and spaces are shared—all these factors become another artwork."

=== The Institute of Memory (TIMe) (2015–2019) ===
TIMe is a play written and directed by Jan involving two actors and a transforming light sculpture which premiered in 2015 at REDCAT in Los Angeles. The work was also performed in Portland, New York City, Seattle, Boston, San Francisco, Swarthmore, and Krakow.

While growing up in Massachusetts, Jan had little contact with his father, Henryk Ryniewicz, whom he described as "an enigmatic person and a misanthrope." Ryniewicz died in 2009, with Jan learning about his death years later in 2012. He became the subject matter of Jan's The Institute of Memory (TIMe)—his first autobiographical work, influenced in part by Polish director, Tadeusz Kantor. Living mainly as a hermit on the Harvard University campus, Ryniewicz was mostly a mystery figure in Jan's life, with interactions marked by Ryniewicz's paranoia. A trip to Poland and conversations with the locals there, as well as the discovery of the Institute of National Memory in Poland led Jan to ask questions about his father, his role as a Cold War operative, and his descent into dementia and schizophrenia. To further explore the concept of memory and "what remembering looks like and feels like in the world, in terms of the human body," Jan worked with students in CalArts, conducting exercises using a laser scanning device called a lidar, which creates a 3-dimensional model of a space and the bodies within it. "We created these strange composites which looked like the ash-covered corpses from Mount Vesuvius in Pompeii. Like petrified bodies or ghosts," says Jan. "They also reminded me of the shadows from the Hiroshima bombings—the light impression of a person, casting a shadow on a wall." This technology became an integral component of TIMe. Jan used the lidar to scan places where he spent time with his father, compiling the imagery into a video for the performance alongside CAT scans, MRIs, and x-rays that pieces together a narrative of his father's personality and condition. Upon learning more about his father through the work, Jan comments "For a long time, I thought his absence had left nearly no impression, because he wasn't there. I came to learn that voids in fact leave very large impressions."

=== Other works ===
- Pandæmonium (2017) (in collaboration with Nichole Canuso Dance Company & Geoff Sobelle)
- A Suicide Bombing By Invitation Only (2010)
- Takes (2010) (in collaboration with Nichole Canuso Dance Company)
- Odyssey of the Odyssey (2015) (in collaboration with Roger Guenveur Smith)
- Makandal (2014)
- Blood of the Fang Music Video (2019) (Clipping, Daveed Diggs)
- Psychocosmonautics (2004)
