= Sarah DeLappe =

American playwright

- Occupations: Playwright, screenwriter, writer
- Writing career
- Language: English
- Genres: Theatre, drama

Sarah DeLappe is an American playwright. Her play The Wolves premiered Off-Broadway in 2016 to acclaim. It received the American Playwriting Foundation's Relentless Award in 2015 and was a finalist for the 2017 Pulitzer Prize for Drama. DeLappe wrote the screenplay for the 2022 film Bodies Bodies Bodies.

== Career ==
DeLappe grew up in Reno, Nevada. Her father is the visual artist Joseph DeLappe, and her mother is a photographer and poet Laurie Macfee. She attended Yale College, where her mentors included Paula Vogel. DeLappe's play The Wolves was premiered by The Playwrights Realm in September 2016 Off-Broadway at The Duke at 42nd Street and received acclaim and awards. The play centers on the experiences of high school girls through their weekly Saturday morning pre-game soccer warmups. It received the American Playwriting Foundation's inaugural Relentless Award in 2015, and was a New York Times Critic's Pick. The play won the 2017 Obie Award for Ensemble work.

The Economist reviewer wrote: "She has penned an absorbing portrait of female adolescence in The Wolves". The play was a finalist in 2015–16 for the Susan Smith Blackburn Prize, a runner-up for the Yale Drama Series Prize, and a finalist for the 2017 Pulitzer Prize for Drama. The Pulitzer Prize committee wrote: "For a timely play about a girls’ high school soccer team that illuminates with the unmistakable ping of reality the way young selves are formed when innate character clashes with external challenges."

DeLappe served as a writer-in-residence alongside J.T. Rogers for the 2018 National Playwrights Conference at the Eugene O'Neill Theater Center.

DeLappe wrote the screenplay for the 2022 black comedy slasher film Bodies Bodies Bodies, based on a story and spec script by writer Kristen Roupenian.

In March 2022, it was announced the DeLappe would adapt and executive produce the 1962 novel Cassandra at the Wedding by Dorothy Baker as a film for Neon. DeLappe co-wrote the episode "The Heroes' Banquet" for the 2024 HBO miniseries The Regime.
