= John Cassavetes filmography =

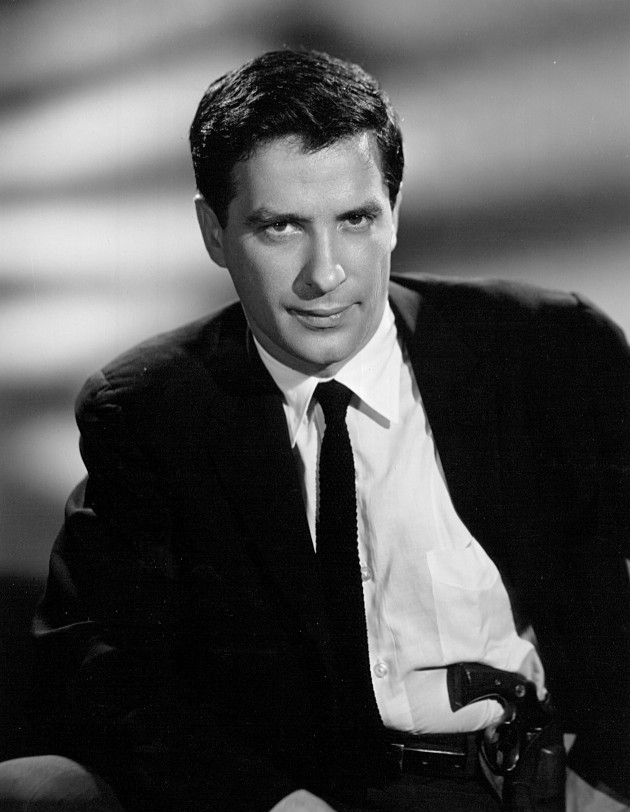
John Cassavetes as Johnny Staccato, 1959

John Cassavetes began his career in film in 1953 and ended it in 1986, between which times he was involved in every aspect of the film, television, and stage arts, including acting, directing, scoring, shooting, editing, producing, and marketing.

Cassavetes became known for directing a string of critically acclaimed independent films including Shadows (1959), Faces (1968), Husbands (1970), Minnie and Moskowitz (1971), A Woman Under the Influence (1974), Opening Night (1977), Gloria (1980), and Love Streams (1984). Cassavetes also had leading roles in both Opening Night and Love Streams opposite his wife Gena Rowlands.

He is also known for acting in films such as Martin Ritt's film noir Edge of the City (1957), and Roman Polanski's horror film Rosemary's Baby (1968), Giuliano Montaldo's Italian crime film Machine Gun McCain (1969), and Elaine May's crime drama Mikey and Nicky (1976). He earned an Academy Award for Best Supporting Actor nomination for his performance in the war film The Dirty Dozen (1967).

== Filmmaker ==
Year	Title	Functioned as				Notes
Year	Title	Director	Writer	Producer	Other	Notes
1959	Shadows	Yes	Yes	No	No	Co-written with Robert Alan Aurthur
1961	Too Late Blues	Yes	Yes	Yes	No	Co-written with Richard Carr
1963	A Child Is Waiting	Yes	No	No	No	
1968	Faces	Yes	Yes	Uncredited	Yes	Also uncredited editor
1970	Husbands	Yes	Yes	Yes	Yes	Also uncredited editor and actor
1971	Minnie and Moskowitz	Yes	Yes	No	Yes	Also uncredited actor
1974	A Woman Under the Influence	Yes	Yes	No	No	
1976	The Killing of a Chinese Bookie	Yes	Yes	No	No	
1977	Opening Night	Yes	Yes	No	Yes	Also actor
1980	Gloria	Yes	Yes	No	No	
1984	Love Streams	Yes	Yes	No	Yes	Co-written with Ted Allan, also actor
1986	Big Trouble	Yes	No	No	No	

== Actor ==
=== Film ===
Year	Title	Role	Notes
1951	Fourteen Hours	Bit Role	Uncredited
1953	Taxi	Bit Role	Uncredited
1955	The Night Holds Terror	Robert Batsford	
1956	Crime in the Streets	Frankie Dane	
1957	Edge of the City	Axel Nordmann	
1957	Affair in Havana	Nick	
1958	Saddle the Wind	Tony Sinclair	
1958	Virgin Island	Evan	
1959	Shadows	Pedestrian	Uncredited
1961	Too Late Blues	Narrator	Uncredited
1962	The Webster Boy	Vance Miller	
1963	A Child Is Waiting	Adult Patient	Uncredited
1964	The Killers	Johnny North	
1967	Devil's Angels	Cody	
1967	The Dirty Dozen	Victor Franko	
1968	Rosemary's Baby	Guy Woodhouse	
1968	Bandits in Rome	Mario Corda	
1969	Machine Gun McCain	Hank McCain	
1969	If It's Tuesday, This Must Be Belgium	Steve	
1970	Husbands	Gus Demetri	
1971	Minnie and Moskowitz	Jim	Uncredited
1975	Capone	Frankie Yale	
1976	Two-Minute Warning	Sgt. Button	
1976	Mikey and Nicky	Nicky Godalin	
1977	Heroes	VA Doctor	Uncredited
1977	Opening Night	Maurice Aarons	
1978	The Fury	Ben Childress	
1978	Brass Target	Maj. Joe De Lucca	
1981	Whose Life Is It Anyway?	Dr. Michael Emerson	
1982	The Incubus	Sam Cordell	
1982	Tempest	Phillip Dimitrius	
1982	The Haircut	Music Industry Executive	Short film
1983	Marvin & Tige	Marvin Stewart	
1984	Love Streams	Robert Harmon	
1984	Fräulein Berlin	Himself	

=== Television ===
Year	Title	Role	Notes
1953	You Are There	Plato	Episode: "The Death of Socrates (399 B.C.)"
1954	Robert Montgomery Presents	Unknown	Episode: "Diary"
1954	NBC Opera Theatre	Jochanaan	Episode: "Salome"
1954–55	Danger	Various	3 episodes
1955	Kraft Television Theatre	Unknown	Episode: "Judge Contain's Hotel"
1955	The Elgin Hour	Private Tommy Fitch / Frankie Dane	2 episodes
1955	Armstrong Circle Theatre	Arthur / Clay Cochran	3 episodes
1955	Pond's Theater	Unknown	Episode: "Coquette"
1955	Goodyear Television Playhouse	Paul Davis	Episode: "The Expendable House"
1956	The United States Steel Hour	Johnny	Episode: "Bring Me a Dream"
1956	Alfred Hitchcock Presents	Sam Cobbett	Season 1 Episode 16: "You Got to Have Luck"
1956	Appointment with Adventure	Unknown	Episode: "All Through the Night"
1956	The 20th Century Fox Hour	Max Markheim	Episode: "The Last Patriarch"
1956	Climax!	Abel Wintery / McCloud	2 episodes
1957	O. Henry Playhouse	Unknown	Episode: "Two Renegades"
1957	Playhouse 90	Dexter Green	Episode: "Winter Dreams"
1958	Westinghouse Studio One	Private Paul Greco	Episode: "Kurishiki Incident"
1958	Alcoa Theatre	Tony Benedetti	Episode: "The First Star"
1958	Pursuit	Sam Caldwell	Episode: "Calculated Risk"
1959	General Electric Theater	Johnny	Episode: "Train for Tecumseh"
1959	Lux Video Theatre	Christo Sierra	Episode: "The Dreamer"
1959	Decoy	Carl Walton	Episode: "Across the World"
1959–60	Johnny Staccato	Johnny Staccato / The Killer	27 episodes
1961	Rawhide	Cal Fletcher	S3:E19, "Incident Near Gloomy River"
1962	The Lloyd Bridges Show	Castigo	Episode: "El Medico"
1962	Dr. Kildare	Makin Saund	Episode: "The Visitors"
1963	Channing	Lloyd Sullivan	Episode: "Message from the Tin Room"
1963	Breaking Point	Evan Price	Episode: "There Are the Hip, and There Are the Square"
1964	The Alfred Hitchcock Hour	Lee Griffin	Season 2 Episode 19: "Murder Case"
1964	The Alfred Hitchcock Hour	Rusty Connors	Season 3 Episode 3: "Water's Edge"
1964–65	Burke's Law	Alfred Algeron / Various	4 episodes
1965	Profiles in Courage	Parsons	Episode: "John Peter Altgeld"
1965	Kraft Suspense Theatre	Peter Chandler	Episode: "Won't It Ever Be Morning?"
1965	Combat!	Kalb	Episode: "S.I.W."
1965	The Legend of Jesse James	Blackie Dolan	Episode: "The Quest"
1965	Voyage to the Bottom of the Sea	Everett Lang	Episode: "The Peacemaker"
1965–67	Bob Hope Presents the Chrysler Theatre	Various	3 episodes
1966	The Virginian	Jonah MacIntosh	Episode: "Long Ride to Wind River"
1966	The Long, Hot Summer	Tim Demming	Episode: "The Intruders"
1968	Off to See the Wizard	General Karonos	Episode: "Alexander the Great"
1972	Columbo	Alex Benedict	Episode: "Étude in Black"
1973	Nightside	Carmine Kelly	Television film
1979	Flesh and Blood	Gus Caputo	Television film
1985	King Kongs Faust	Himself	Television film

== Documentary appearances ==
Year	Title	Notes
1989	I'm Almost Not Crazy: John Cassavetes, the Man and His Work	Filmed in 1984
