= Wink murder =

Children's party game

- Players: 4 or more
- Setup time: less than 5 minutes
- Playing time: Approx. 2–20 mins per round
- Chance: Low
- Skills: Stealth, bluffing, creativity

Wink murder is a party game or parlour game in which a secretly selected player is able to "kill" others by winking at them, while the surviving players try to identify the killer. The game is also variously known as murder wink, killer, murder in the dark, lonely ghost and killer killer. The practical minimum number of players is four, but the spirit of the game is best captured by groups of at least six players or more.

The game may be played with all players seated in a circle, or wandering around many rooms at a social event.

== Gameplay ==
In each round of play, one player is secretly assigned the role of "murderer", and one is assigned detective. The detective is sent to leave, and the murderer is chosen and everyone except the detective knows who the murderer is. The players stand in a circle and the detective is called in. The detective stands in the circle and slowly spins, and if someone dies the detective has to guess the murderer. The detective gets 3 chances, and if the detective guesses wrong, the innocent person dies.

The objective of the murderer is to murder as many people as possible without being caught.

== Detective ==
In one variant of the game, sometimes played by children as a class activity in elementary school, another player, unaware of the murderer's identity, is assigned the role of "detective". All other players sit in a circle around the detective, whose objective is to correctly identify and accuse the murderer, minimizing the number of murder victims. A limit is often imposed upon the number of accusations the detective can make. In this version of the game, players other than the murderer and detective do not know the murderer's identity, and have no role to play in the game other than to die noticeably if winked at.

== Murder ==
Harpo Marx in his book Harpo Speaks described a version of this game at the home of Alexander Woollcott, called "Murder". Lots are drawn to choose a district attorney, then drawn a second time to choose (known only to him- or herself) a murderer. The D.A. leaves the house and the social evening proceeds as normal. As soon as the murderer is alone with someone, he says to that person "You are dead". The victim must immediately feign death until discovered, then the D.A. is summoned and questions the suspects (everyone) as to where they were, what they were doing, and with whom. The D.A. then uses deductive reasoning to solve the case. Marx said he played the murderer once, and wrote the deadly phrase on a piece of toilet paper. His victim, Alice Duer Miller, pulled it down and properly "died" on the toilet, but grade-school dropout Marx was immediately identified when she was found; he had written "You are ded".

== Variations ==
The "Deadly Handshake" variation has players walking around and routinely shaking hands as though greeting one another at a party, and the murderer kills by using a special handshake, such as tickling the victim's palm. It is recommended that victims do not "die" immediately, but take a few steps or shake hands with one or two other people before doing so.

In "Lonely Ghost", a player may challenge the murderer (the "lonely ghost") by approaching them and asking them directly. In another variant of the basic game, a player may simply point to their suspect and call out their accusation. If the accuser is correct, they win the game, otherwise they are eliminated. In some variants, a wrongly accused player is also eliminated.

"Cops and Robbers" is a drinking game variation of wink murder. It uses the ace and king found in a deck of playing cards to identify the "cop" and the "robber." How a cop or a robber relates is not known. The game starts by using the same number of playing cards as players, including one ace and one king. The rest of the cards are usually number cards which represent the number of seconds to drink. Play begins by shuffling the cards and laying them all face down. Each player grabs a card and keeps it to themselves. The player with the ace is the player who winks to one other player. The player who got winked at then says something like "The deal has been made." Usually this player waits a few seconds before making that statement. Once "the deal has been made" the player with the king turns over their card and begins the "interrogation." This player tries to guess who did the winking. As they choose a player, they turn over their card and if they did not have the ace, the other player drinks the number on the card. If they correctly chose the player with the ace, that player must finish their beverage. If the player with the ace winks at the player with the king, an immediate "social" is called and everyone drinks. Because no one knows who will choose the ace or king, all players are involved in either winking or looking for a wink. This can also be played with other drinking games like "drink, drank or drunk" to expedite the festivities.

The "Slit Throat" variation has players walking around in the dark, wandering the halls and rooms of a building. Identities are given out at the beginning with ace of spades as murderer (depending on number of players, there can be multiple murderers), kings are detectives (at least double the number of murderers), all other cards are townspeople (town mob). As people wander around, the murderer kills people in the dark by slitting their throat with a finger (or tapping them on the shoulder) and tells them where to lay down and die, the murderer then walks away from the victim as they proceed to lie down. The murderer may steal the identity card of the victims. All dead people must remain silent and can only answer "Yes" if asked if they are dead. When somebody discovers a dead person they quickly move to turn on the nearest light and yell "Murder in the dark". Then everybody comes to the room for a town meeting, including all people killed that round. A detective may reveal themselves to lead the meeting by showing off their badge (king identity card). During the meeting the townspeople tell the detective what they saw and who they suspect. The detective may then decide to accuse a player of being the murderer or close the meeting and continue the game if they are not ready to do so. If a detective accuses wrongly, they are killed by the town mob and the next round begins. The town mob may also accuse by majority vote, but kill the accused when innocent. After a wrong accusation the game automatically goes on to the next round. The lights are turned off and people resume wandering through the building. During the town meetings the murderer may lie as much as they want to fool the detective and/or the town mob. Only when properly accused the murderer must admit to guilt and the game is over, with the loss of the murderer. If the murderer successfully kills off everybody, they turn on the light and declare themselves the winner, ending the game.

== See also ==
- Murder mystery game
- Mafia (party game)
