= The Wolves (play) =

Play written by Sarah DeLappe

- Original language: English
- Written by: Sarah DeLappe

Premiere
- Date: September 11, 2016
- Place: the Duke on 42nd Street

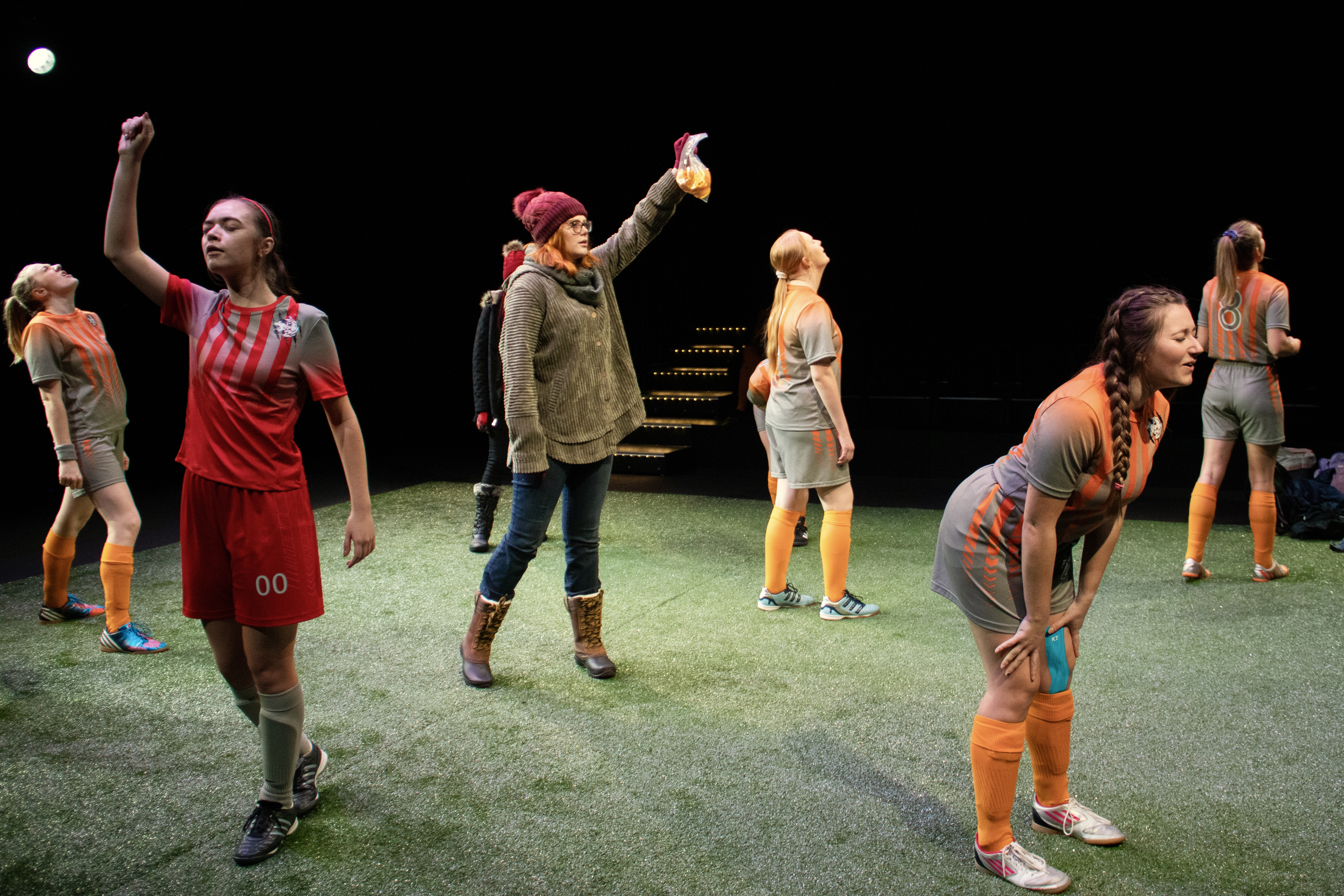
The Wolves performed at UARK Theatre

The Wolves is a one-act play by Sarah DeLappe. It premiered Off-Broadway at the Duke on 42nd Street in September 2016, produced by The Playwrights Realm. It centers on the experiences of high school girls through their weekly Saturday morning pre-game soccer warmups. The play received multiple awards and was a finalist for the 2017 Pulitzer Prize for Drama.

== Synopsis ==
The Wolves is set in an indoor soccer facility. Each scene depicts the nine teenage girls who make up the Wolves, a high school soccer team, conversing while they warm up before their game each week. In most scenes, the team is going through a stretching routine led by #25, the team captain, or doing practice exercises. The girls sometimes continue their gossip from the previous week, bringing up new developments or related topics.

The first scene opens with discussion of the sentencing of an elderly participant of the Cambodian genocide, and conversations stem from there. Overlapping dialogue illustrates an atmosphere where each group of girls have their own, specific conversations while still chiming in on the main topic. These spin-offs include global politics, social gossip about each other and unseen characters, their bodies, their coach's obvious hangovers, their desire to play soccer in college, and speculations about the new girl, #46, who is homeschooled and new to the area. Their conversations are often inappropriate and cause conflict amongst the teammates. #00, the goalie, has social anxiety attacks and runs outside to vomit before each game. #46 slowly begins to fit in and most girls seem to grow more comfortable with each other as the season progresses.

A ski trip taken by #7 and #14 before the second-to-last game leaves the team suffering from injuries and internal drama. #7 suffers a career-ending injury, which forces #46 to step up. She excels, and is even scouted along with two other girls while the rest watch enviously from the sidelines. #14 expresses her anger towards #7 about her neglect during the ski trip and being left with a strange guy (#7's boyfriend's friend). They fight, and end the day on a terrible note.

Tragedy strikes before the final game, which causes #00 to break down in the stadium at night, but also overcome her anxiety. The teammates assume among themselves that the others will ditch the game and they will have to forfeit. However, all of the other girls except #14 come to the stadium one by one, allowing them to play, and they grieve the recent death of #14 in a car accident. As they rally together, Soccer Mom suddenly approaches them, giving them a delirious speech about her late daughter and how the team have banded together in spite of everything, leaving everyone speechless. The team joins in their chant a final time, before Soccer Mom returns with a bag of oranges for them.

== Production history ==
The play had a workshop at Playwrights Horizons Theater School in 2015 in association with Clubbed Thumb, where the play had been developed.

The play was originally produced Off-Broadway at The Duke on 42nd Street by The Playwrights Realm in association with New York Stage & Film and Vassar's Powerhouse Theatre season. The play opened on August 29, 2016, officially on September 11, 2016 and closed on September 29, 2016. The play re-opened at The Duke on November 29, 2016 and closed on December 29, 2016 with additional support from commercial producers Scott Rudin and Eli Bush. It subsequently returned to an Off-Broadway engagement at Lincoln Center Theater’s Mitzi Newhouse Theater on November 1, 2017 and closed on January 7, 2018. The play was directed by Lila Neugebauer.

The play had its European premiere at Theatre Royal Stratford East in October 2018, directed by Ellen McDougall (Artistic Director of Gate Theatre).

== Characters and original cast ==
Role	The Duke on 42nd Street (2016)	The Duke on 42nd Street (2016)	Mitzi Newhouse Theater (2017)
#00	Lizzy Jutila	Lizzy Jutila	Lizzy Jutila
#2	Sarah Mezzanotte	Sarah Mezzanotte	Sarah Mezzanotte
#7	Brenna Coates	Brenna Coates	Brenna Coates
#8	Midori Francis	Midori Francis	Midori Francis
#11	Susannah Perkins	Susannah Perkins	Susannah Perkins
#13	Jenna Dioguardi	Jenna Dioguardi	Jenna Dioguardi
#14	Samia Finnerty	Samia Finnerty	Samia Finnerty
#25	Lauren Patten	Lauren Patten	Paola Sanchez Abreu
#46	Tedra Millan	Tedra Millan	Tedra Millan
Soccer Mom	Mia Barron	Kate Arrington	Mia Barron

== Honors and awards ==
The Wolves received the American Playwriting Foundation's inaugural Relentless Award in 2015, and was a New York Times Critic's Pick. The Economist reviewer wrote: "She has penned an absorbing portrait of female adolescence in The Wolves". The play was a finalist in 2015-16 for the Susan Smith Blackburn Prize. The play won the 2017 Obie Award for Ensemble work. The play was a finalist for the 2017 Pulitzer Prize for Drama. The committee wrote: "For a timely play about a girls’ high school soccer team that illuminates with the unmistakable ping of reality the way young selves are formed when innate character clashes with external challenges."
