= Nadim Abbas =

Hong Kong installation artist (born 1980)

- Born: 1980 (age 45–46); Hong Kong
- Education: Chelsea College of Art & Design (BFA); University of Hong Kong (MPhil)
- Known for: Installation art, sculpture
- Notable work: Cataract (2010), Marine Lover (2011), Apocalypse Postponed (2014)
- Movement: Contemporary art

Nadim Abbas (born 1980 in Hong Kong) is a Hong Kong installation artist.

== Biography ==
Abbas received his BFA from London's Chelsea College of Art & Design and MPhil from the University of Hong Kong Department of Comparative Literature. He teaches at the City University Hong Kong School of Creative Media and the Hong Kong Art School/ RMIT University.

== Work ==
Abbas's practice includes heavily researched installation and sculptural works that play on the psychological patterns of everyday objects and kitsch. His work draws thematic inspiration from literature, science and psychology.

His first solo exhibition was the "Cataract" at Experimenta, on 2010. Other works included are "Marine Lover" at ART HK 11, and a collaboration with Saamlung Gallery on a project for the 2012 Hong Kong International Art Fair.

For Art Basel Hong Kong in 2014, Abbas was invited by Absolut to collaborate on an "art bar", an art installation doubling as a pop up bar during Art Basel fairs around the world. Abbas' concept called "Apocalypse Postponed" drew inspiration from Science Fiction films, 20th century military architecture and defensive plans such as The Atlantic Wall and the Swiss National Redoubt, creating a bunker-like environment, constructed from sand bags, with blacked-out windows within a 7000 square foot space.
