= Punto Urban Art Museum =

Open air museum in Salem, Massachusetts

The Punto Urban Art Museum is an open-air museum located in Salem, Massachusetts in the "El Punto" Neighborhood. It exists over a three block radius and includes the artwork of many world renowned and local artists and over 75 large scale murals. Some of the aims of the museum are to create neighborhood pride, break down socioeconomic barriers between the neighborhood and the rest of Salem, and provide more economic opportunity for local businesses.

== Description ==
In 1978 the non-profit organization, the North Shore Community Development Coalition was founded in The Point, or "El Punto" Neighborhood, in Salem. The neighborhood is a traditionally working class one, and today consists of mostly Latinx and immigrant residents. Many of the historic early 20th century architecture in the neighborhood consists of brick buildings built after the Salem fire of 1914 destroyed much of the property in the area. The Point Neighborhood Historic District was listed on the National Register of Historic Places in 2014. The historic neighborhood is bounded by Peabody St., Congress St., Chase St., and Lafayette St. Today, the coalition owns a quarter of the properties in the neighborhood as affordable housing.

The North Shore Community Development Coalition is the creator of the mission-driven art program that is the museum. In 2013 plans started forming with how to improve the quality of life for those in The Point with the reduction of negative and untrue stigma as a high priority. There was a year-long community planning process that involved the North Shore Community Development Coalition, the City of Salem, the Point Neighborhood Association, and the Metropolitan Area Planning Council.

The museum started in 2017 with 50 murals. The coalition's board of directors includes neighborhood residents and business owners. International artists from South America, the Dominican Republic, Puerto Rico, Spain, Italy, and more were sponsored to create art at the Museum and to mentor local artists as well.

In 2020 there was a call for local artists to create mural submissions based on Nina Simone’s song “I Wish I Knew How It Would Feel to Be Free.”

== Selected artists and works ==
Artist	Title of Work	Location	Dates
Belin	Untitled	64 Harbor Street	2017 September
Bikismo	The Chrome Dog	37 Ward Street	2017 September
Chor Boogie	Love Child	24 Peabody Street	2017 September
Mr. Cenz	The Queen of the Block	113 Lafayette Street	2018 September
Silvia López Chavez	Colorín Colorado	37 Ward Street	2017 September
Paola Delfin	Katherine	6 Ward Street	2018 August
Golden	Our Lady of Guadalupe	104 Lafayette Street	2017 June
Ledania	Totem		2019 July
Antonyo Marest	Villa Alegra	104 Lafayette Street	2018 October
Maria Molteni	Tormenta en la Cancha	15 Ward Street	2018 June
Okuda	Cat Witch	64 Harbor Street	2017 May
Pixel Pancho	Garden Boy	17 Ward St.	2018 September
Don Rimx	Le Quedo Bufeaito	38 Peabody Street	2017 May
Veronica Rivera	Untitled	46 Peabody Street	2018 September
Sipros	Super Dali	6 Peabody Street	2017 June
Spok	Window Phone	96 Lafayette Street	
Ruben Ubiera	Yerbatero	109 Lafayette Street	2016 November - 2019
