= Adrian Ellis (consultant) =

American consultant

Adrian Ellis (born 1956), is the founding director of AEA Consulting (founded 1991) and co-founder/director of the Global Cultural Districts Network (founded 2013), a collaborative network for people and organizations responsible for planning, leading and operating cultural districts around the world.

== Career ==
Ellis founded AEA Consulting in 1991, a cultural strategy consulting firm that works with leading cultural organizations and their stakeholders internationally. AEA has offices in London and New York. Ellis left AEA for five years (2007-2012) to join Jazz at Lincoln Center as executive director, returning to AEA in 2012. He co-founded the Global Cultural Districts Network in 2013.

Ellis 's tenure at Jazz at Lincoln Center was a period of stability – notwithstanding the 2008 financial crisis – and of a number of programmatic initiatives, including Jazz at Lincoln Center's visit to Cuba, JALC's long term residency at the Barbican Arts Center, the move of the NEA's annual Jazz Masters awards ceremony to JALC, and the forging on an agreement with St Regis hotels to open jazz clubs, the first of which opened in Doha in 2012. Ellis was voted a Jazz Hero by the Jazz Journalists Association in 2012 for his work at JALC.

Prior to 1990, Ellis served as Executive Director of The Conran Foundation in London (1986-1990), where he planned and managed the creation of the Design Museum. He began his career as a civil servant in the UK Treasury and the Cabinet Office, where he worked on service-wide efficiency reviews and privatization, and ran the office of the Economic Secretary to the Treasury. Ellis received his B.A. (first class) and M.A. degrees at University College, Oxford, where he served as a College Lecturer in Politics; and completed additional graduate work at London School of Economics.

== Influence ==
Ellis writes and lectures extensively on management and planning issues in the cultural sector. He has published, lectured, and organized conferences for numerous distinguished forums including The International New York Times Art for Tomorrow Conference, The Independent, The New Statesman, Apollo Magazine, London Essays, Fortune, The Salzburg Seminar, Blouin Creative Leadership Summit, Demos, the Lord Mayor of Sydney's Annual Design Excellence Forum, the J. Paul Getty Trust, The Clark Art Seminar, the Canadian Arts Summit, New Cities Summit, REMIX Summit, and annual conferences of the American Institute of Architects, International Society for the Performing Arts, and many others. He is also a regular contributor to The Art Newspaper. Ellis was nominated for the list of the 2012 Fifty Most Powerful and Influential People in the Nonprofit Arts, an annual posting on Barry's Blog, a service of the Western States Arts Federation (WESTAF).

Ellis currently serves on the board of Poets House in New York and is a past board member of the Getty Leadership Institute, the Association of Performing Arts Presenters, The Kaufman Center and Pathé Pictures. He currently serves on the International Advisory Committee of the master's program in International Arts Management, a joint program of Southern Methodist University, HEC Montreal, and Bocconi University. Ellis is a past member of the Governing Council of the National Museums and Galleries of Wales, and the Royal Institute of British Architects' Architecture Centre Committee. He has been a Scholar in Residence at Columbia University and has taught arts administration for Boston University, New York University, National Arts Strategies, and the Clore Fellows Programme.
