= Christine D'Souza Gelb =

American film executive (born 1984)

- Born: August 6, 1984 (age 42)
- Occupation: Film executive
- Organization: 2AM
- Spouse: David Gelb (m. 2016)
- Parent(s): Terence D'Souza; Bernadette Gomes

Christine Esmeralda D'Souza Gelb (born August 6, 1984) is an American film executive who co-founded the studio 2AM with David Hinojosa and Kevin Rowe.

== Early life and education ==
D'Souza was born on August 6, 1984, to Terence D'Souza, a neurologist originally from Mumbai, India, and Bernadette Gomes, a New Orleans civil district court judge born in Goa, India. She is of Konkani descent.

She attended Isidore Newman School in New Orleans, graduating in the class of 2002.

== Career ==
D'Souza Gelb joined the film production and distribution company Endeavor Content in 2012 as an agent in the company's finance and packaging department. At Endeavor, she sold the distribution rights for several films, including Under the Skin (2013), The Witch (2015), Manchester by the Sea (2016), The Farewell (2019), and Midsommar (2019). She left the company in 2020.

In February 2021, D'Souza Gelb launched the film studio 2AM alongside David Hinojosa and Kevin Rowe as founding partners.

== Filmography ==
Year	Title	Credit
2022	Resurrection	Executive producer
2022	Bodies Bodies Bodies	Executive producer
2023	Earth Mama	Executive producer
2023	Past Lives	Executive producer
2024	Love Me	Executive producer
2024	Little Death	Executive producer
2024	Omni Loop	Executive producer
2024	Babygirl	Executive producer
2025	Serious People	Executive producer
TBA	Bushido	Producer
TBA	Untitled Arkasha Stevenson film	Producer

== Personal life ==
D'Souza Gelb met her husband, American film director David Gelb, at her office in Los Angeles while they discussed the release of his documentary. They married on October 1, 2016, in New Orleans.
