= Materialists (film) =

2025 film by Celine Song

- Theatrical release poster
- Directed by: Celine Song
- Written by: Celine Song
- Produced by: David Hinojosa; Christine Vachon; Pamela Koffler; Celine Song
- Starring: Dakota Johnson; Chris Evans; Pedro Pascal
- Cinematography: Shabier Kirchner
- Edited by: Keith Fraase
- Music by: Daniel Pemberton
- Production companies: 2AM; Killer Films
- Distributed by: A24 (United States); Sony Pictures Releasing International; Stage 6 Films (International) (Note: excludes Canada (VVS Films), China, Japan (Happinet Phantom Studios), and Russia (Volga))
- Release date: June 13, 2025
- Running time: 117 minutes
- Country: United States
- Language: English
- Budget: $20 million
- Box office: $108 million

Materialists is a 2025 American romantic comedy-drama film written and directed by Celine Song and starring Dakota Johnson, Chris Evans, and Pedro Pascal. The film follows a matchmaker, her ex-boyfriend, and a wealthy financier amid New York City's competitive dating scene. It is Song's second feature film, following Past Lives (2023), and was produced by Killer Films and 2AM. Materialists was released in the United States on June 13, 2025, by A24. The film received generally positive reviews and grossed $108 million on a $20 million budget.

== Plot ==
Lucy Mason, a former actress, works as a successful matchmaker at Adore in New York City. She expresses cynicism about her own romantic prospects while growing frustrated with her clients' unrealistic standards. Her long-term client Sophie is struggling to lower her standards and settle while Lucy consoles her over her recent rejection.

Lucy attends a former client's wedding, the ninth she has been responsible for. The bride is crying, feeling she is marrying for shallow reasons and out of obligation, but Lucy ultimately persuades her to proceed with the ceremony. At the wedding reception, Lucy is approached by financier Harry Castillo, the groom's brother, who overhears Lucy's business pitch to other singles at the party. He shows interest in her, but she rebuffs him, suggesting instead that he become an Adore client. Also at the wedding is Lucy's ex-boyfriend John Pitts, who is working as a cater-waiter and continues to pursue acting. They reminisce about their past relationship, which ended due to differing financial aspirations.

Harry persists in courting Lucy, taking her to upscale restaurants. She initially questions his interest, believing he could find a better partner, but he reassures her that his interest is genuine. Their relationship becomes official, and Lucy's renewed optimism translates to her work life; Sophie's latest match Mark tells Lucy that he enjoyed the date with Sophie and wants to see her again.

Lucy's confidence is shaken when her boss, Violet, informs her that Sophie is suing Adore because Mark assaulted her after the date. Violet tells Lucy that the situation was out of her hands, orders her to take four weeks off to clear her mind and instructs her not to contact Sophie due to the lawsuit. Despite Violet's warning, Lucy tracks Sophie down and personally apologizes. Sophie angrily rejects the apology, calling her a "pimp" who was looking to pawn off a problem client on any man she could, regardless of the consequences. She storms off, adding to Lucy's guilt.

Preparing to travel to Iceland with Harry, Lucy finds an engagement ring in his luggage. Later that night, she discovers he had undergone a $200,000 tibial lengthening surgery to increase his height. He defends the decision, asking her if it changes her feelings for him. While it does not, Lucy realizes they are both pursuing the relationship simply because they "check the boxes" of what each is seeking in a partner, but are not actually in love. They amicably break up.

As Lucy had sublet her apartment because of the trip, she visits John, who suggests they travel upstate with money he earned from his play. At a wedding they gatecrash together, she kisses him. When John asks if they are getting back together, Lucy expresses uncertainty, citing her conflicted values. John confesses he has always loved her and envisions a future together despite his insecurity for not being able to provide the relationship she wanted, while Lucy admits that her dissatisfaction with John's financial situation overshadowed their love when they were together and assumes that John hates her, which he denies.

Lucy receives a panicked call from Sophie; Mark is outside her apartment and the police are refusing to intervene since he has not broken in. Lucy and John rush back to the city, finding that Mark has already left. Lucy helps Sophie file a restraining order and they reconcile. Before parting, John appeals to Lucy to rekindle their relationship, promising to remind himself every day that he loves her and work harder to support their relationship. Later, it is revealed through a phone call from Violet that Sophie begins dating a new match from Adore; Harry has also become a client. Violet, who is needed to handle another branch in London, offers Lucy a promotion to lead the New York office. Lucy reveals that she intended to resign but agrees to consider the offer.

In Central Park, John proposes with a flower ring, and Lucy accepts. The credits depict various couples, including Lucy and John, receiving marriage licenses at the city clerk's office.

== Cast ==
- Dakota Johnson as Lucy Mason, an actress turned matchmaker at Adore
- Chris Evans as John Pitts, Lucy's ex, who is a theatre actor and a catering waiter
- Pedro Pascal as Harry Castillo, a wealthy man who takes an interest in Lucy
- Zoë Winters as Sophie, Lucy's client
- Marin Ireland as Violet, Lucy's superior at Adore
- Louisa Jacobson as Charlotte, one of Lucy's clients

Dasha Nekrasova appears as Daisy, one of Lucy's co-workers, while Eddie Cahill, Sawyer Spielberg and Joseph Lee portray Lucy's clients Robert, Mason and Trevor, respectively. Past Lives star John Magaro voices Mark P., Sophie's date whom Lucy matched through Adore, and Baby Rose cameos as a wedding singer.

== Production ==
Materialists was written and directed by Celine Song, marking her second feature following Past Lives (2023). The project was announced in February 2024, with Christine Vachon and Pamela Koffler of Killer Films, and David Hinojosa of 2AM, serving as producers. At the time of the announcement, Dakota Johnson, Chris Evans and Pedro Pascal were confirmed to star. A24 was attached as the film's domestic distributor and international sales agent, bringing the project to the European Film Market to secure financing. The film was co-financed by IPR.VC. Later that month, Sony Pictures acquired international distribution rights (excluding Russia, China, and Japan) in an eight-figure deal. In May 2024, Zoë Winters, Dasha Nekrasova, Louisa Jacobson, and Marin Ireland were announced as additional cast members.

=== Costume design ===
Katina Danabassis was the costumer designer for Materialists, previously working with Song on Past Lives. Costumes in Materialists were designed to reflect the roles of economic class and social status in the New York City dating scene. In formulating initial costume ideas for Pedro Pascal's Harry, Danabassis included 1990s paparazzi images of John F. Kennedy Jr. and Carolyn Bessette Kennedy as part of her pitch deck. Harry, a wealthy financial investor, wears luxury brands like Ralph Lauren Purple Label, Hermès and Zegna. For Danabassis, Harry's clothing reflects his "concern with perception" and that "dressing well is a protective measure". Harry wears luxury Jaeger-LeCoultre Reverso Tribute Chronograph and Master Control Chronograph watches in rose gold with black dials. John's clothing was informed by his economic precarity as he "doesn't have the budget or the interest to be updating his wardrobe". Danabassis chose affordable and accessible sources for John's clothing. John wears a t-shirt with the logo of Foxy Vegetables, an East Coast produce brand, which was Danabassis' own t-shirt that she gave to the production. John's suiting was provided by Brooks Brothers.

Costume design for Lucy was informed by her role as a matchmaker and how personal style affects her ability to attract matches for her clients. It emphasizes minimalism with a mix of mid-range designers with Danabassis saying she "might splurge on a Proenza [Schouler] dress". During early planning between Danabassis and Song, they decided that Lucy needed an iconic visually striking dress, settling on a blue dress from Proenza Schouler which is featured on the film's poster. She wears a strong-shouldered pinstripe Aritzia blazer, wide striped Versace mini skirt and Banana Republic blouse with knee-high Paris Texas boots. Danabassis wanted to put Lucy in a "power suit" that "felt very New York". Lucy's skirt suit references Working Girl (1988), starring Johnson's mother Melanie Griffith. For her jewellry, Danabassis says that "Lucy is a silver girl" which is in contrast to Harry exclusively wearing yellow gold. The clash between Lucy and Harry's jewellry signals that they are not a romantic match. Danabassis made a distinction in Lucy's outfits when dating Harry or John. With Harry, she appeals to his sensibilities with clothing that is "classic, chic, upscale, and a little bit minimal" according to Danabassis. In contrast, Lucy wears more natural, floral pieces with John.

=== Filming ===
Principal photography for Materialists began on April 29, 2024, in New York City and ended on June 6, 2024. Filming primarily took place in the boroughs of Manhattan and Brooklyn. The neighborhoods include Sunset Park, Brooklyn Heights, and the West Village. The scene depicting the cavemen getting engaged in the first marriage was shot in Durango, Mexico. Shabier Kirchner served as cinematographer for Materialists, marking his second collaboration with Song following Past Lives. Kirchner shot Materialists on 35mm film using the Kodak Vision3 200T 5213 and Vision3 500T 5219 film stocks. It was captured using the Panavision Millennium XL2 camera fitted with Panavision Primo anamorphic lenses.

== Music ==
In March 2025, it was announced that Daniel Pemberton would compose the musical score for Materialists. Japanese Breakfast wrote the song "My Baby (Got Nothing At All)" for the film, which was released as a single on June 9. Baby Rose also worked on two songs: "I'll Be Your Mirror" and "That's All", which were also released as singles on June 13. The soundtrack was released through A24 Music on June 13, the same day as the film. The original score was composed by Daniel Pemberton and released through Milan Records on June 13, 2025.

== Release ==
Materialists was released theatrically in the United States by A24 on June 13, 2025. Sony Pictures Releasing International distributed the film internationally on August 16, 2025.

== Reception ==
=== Box office ===
Materialists has grossed $37 million in the United States and Canada, and $71 million in other territories, for a worldwide total of $108 million. In the United States and Canada, the film was released alongside How to Train Your Dragon and was projected to gross $7–9 million from 2,844 theaters in its opening weekend. The film made $5 million on its first day, including $1.5 million from Thursday night previews. It went on to slightly overperform, debuting to $12 million and finishing in third behind How to Train Your Dragon and holdover Lilo & Stitch.

=== Critical reception ===
On the review aggregator website Rotten Tomatoes, 77% of 302 critics' reviews are positive, with an average rating of 7.2/10. The website's consensus reads: "A mature deconstruction of the conventional rom-com, Materialists provides its trio of swoon-worthy stars some of their meatiest material yet while reaffirming Celine Song as a modern master of relationship dramas." Metacritic, which uses a weighted average, assigned the film a score of 70 out of 100, based on 50 critics, indicating "generally favorable" reviews.

Audiences polled by CinemaScore gave the film an average grade of "B–" on an A+ to F scale, while those surveyed by PostTrak gave it a 50% overall positive score. Christy Lemire of RogerEbert.com praised the film's character depth and clear-eyed approach to romance, while Owen Gleiberman of Variety commended its social observations. Manohla Dargis of The New York Times called the film "formally inventive" and "thoroughly adult", and Entertainment Weekly compared Song's cultural wit to that of Jane Austen.

Several critics offered more measured assessments. Justin Chang of The New Yorker appreciated the dialogue but found the second half lost momentum, while NPR's Aisha Harris noted the film was occasionally undermined by its ambitions and criticized its handling of a sexual assault subplot. Natalia Keogan of The A.V. Club felt the film lacked the character depth of Song's earlier work. British reviews were notably negative. The Times called the film "the biggest disappointment of the decade", criticizing its casting and dialogue-heavy approach, while The Independent cited tonal inconsistency and a lack of chemistry between Johnson and Evans. Writing for Jacobin, Kristen Ghodsee interpreted the film as a critique of courtship under capitalism, arguing it depicts how economic pressures shape romantic choices.

=== Accolades ===
Accolades received by Materialists
Award	Date of ceremony	Category	Recipient(s)	Result	Ref.
Artios Awards	February 26, 2026	Feature: Big Budget: Comedy	Douglas Aibel; Associate Casting Director: Matthew Glasner	Nominated	
Astra Midseason Movie Awards	July 3, 2025	Best Picture	Materialists	Nominated	
Astra Midseason Movie Awards	July 3, 2025	Best Director	Celine Song	Nominated	
Astra Midseason Movie Awards	July 3, 2025	Best Actor	Chris Evans	Nominated	
Astra Midseason Movie Awards	July 3, 2025	Best Actress	Dakota Johnson	Nominated	
Astra Midseason Movie Awards	July 3, 2025	Best Supporting Actor	Pedro Pascal	Nominated	
Astra Midseason Movie Awards	July 3, 2025	Best Screenplay	Celine Song	Nominated	
Guild of Music Supervisors Awards	February 28, 2026	Best Song Written and/or Recorded for a Film	"My Baby (Got Nothing At All)" – Songwriter: Michelle Chongmi Zauner; Performer: Japanese Breakfast; Music Supervisor: Meghan Currier	Nominated	
NAACP Image Awards	February 28, 2026	Outstanding Cinematography in a Motion Picture	Shabier Kirchner	Nominated	

== See also ==
- List of films set in New York City
