= Love Is Not the Answer =

American film

- Directed by: Michael Cera
- Screenplay by: Michael Cera
- Produced by: David Hinojosa; Julia Oh; Christine D'Souza Gelb; Michael Cera; Nick Gordon; Carter Stanton; Peter Niehoff; Jomon Thomas; Shane Boucher
- Starring: Pamela Anderson; Steve Coogan; Jamie Dornan; Lucas Hedges; Julia Best Warner; Shirley Henderson
- Production companies: 2AM; Brookstreet Pictures; Mirador Pictures; Evania; IPR.VC; TPC
- Country: United States
- Language: English

Love Is Not the Answer is an upcoming American absurdist comedy film written and directed by Michael Cera in his feature directorial debut. It has an ensemble cast including Pamela Anderson, Steve Coogan, Jamie Dornan, Lucas Hedges, Julia Best Warner, and Shirley Henderson.

== Cast ==
- Pamela Anderson
- Steve Coogan
- Jamie Dornan
- Lucas Hedges
- Julia Best Warner
- Shirley Henderson
- Miles Cameron
- Joseph Longo
- Hannah Heller
- Alyssa Bresnahan
- Maryann Urbano

== Production ==
The film is written and directed by Michael Cera in his directorial debut and is produced by 2AM.

In May 2025, an ensemble cast was reported, including Pamela Anderson, Steve Coogan, Fred Hechinger and Jamie Dornan. In December 2025, Lucas Hedges, Julia Best Warner, Shirley Henderson, Miles Cameron, Joseph Longo, Hannah Heller, Alyssa Bresnahan and Maryann Urbano joined the cast of the film, with Hechinger departing due to a scheduling conflict.

Filming commenced in November 2025. Some of the filming took place in downtown Carleton Place, ON as well as in and around the famous cafe in Arnprior, ON called Ottawa Valley Coffee.
