= Peaked =

Upcoming comedy film by Molly Gordon

- Directed by: Molly Gordon
- Written by: Molly Gordon; Allie Levitan
- Produced by: Molly Gordon; David Hinojosa; Zach Nutman
- Starring: Molly Gordon; Emma Mackey; Simone Ashley; Connor Storrie; Owen Thiele; Dua Lipa; Laura Dern; Amy Sedaris
- Production companies: A24; 2AM; Topic Studios
- Distributed by: A24
- Country: United States
- Language: English

Peaked is an upcoming American comedy film directed by Molly Gordon, who co-wrote the screenplay with Allie Levitan. It stars Gordon, Emma Mackey, Simone Ashley, Connor Storrie, Owen Thiele, Dua Lipa, Laura Dern, and Amy Sedaris.

== Synopsis ==
Two friends attempt to re-live their popularity in high school at a ten-year class reunion.

== Cast ==
- Molly Gordon
- Emma Mackey
- Connor Storrie
- Simone Ashley
- Dua Lipa
- Laura Dern
- Amy Sedaris
- Owen Thiele
- Levon Hawke
- Mitra Jouhari
- Gabby Windey
- Jaya Harper
- Emil Wakim
- Alex Consani
- Jeremy Allen White

== Production ==
Molly Gordon and Allie Levitan co-wrote the script for Peaked. In February 2025, American studio A24 signed on to finance and produce the film. Gordon would produce the film alongside David Hinojosa and Zach Nutman of 2AM. Topic Studios provided additional funding. In January 2026, it was announced that Emma Mackey was in talks to star. In February, Laura Dern, Simone Ashley, Levon Hawke, Mitra Jouhari, and Gabby Windey joined the cast, with Connor Storrie in talks to join. On March 2, 2026, filming took place at the Woodbridge Center Mall in Woodbridge Township, New Jersey. Later that month, Amy Sedaris, Owen Thiele, Jaya Harper, Emil Wakim, Alex Consani, and Dua Lipa joined the cast, with Mackey and Storrie's casting being confirmed. In June 2026, Jeremy Allen White revealed he had shot a small cameo for the film.
