= 2AM (company) =

American film production and management company

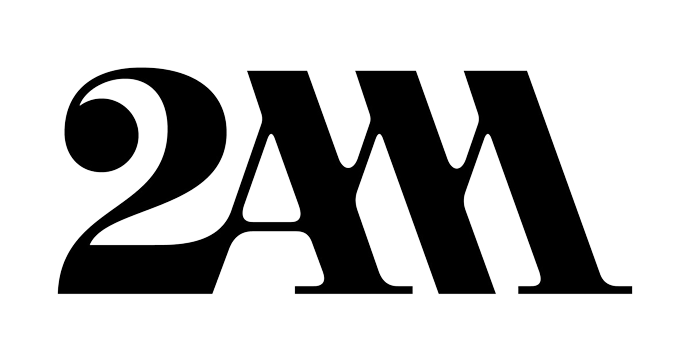
- Industry: Film industry
- Founded: February 23, 2021; 5 years ago
- Founder: Christine D'Souza Gelb; David Hinojosa; Kevin Rowe
- Defunct: November 12, 2025; 11 months ago
- Fate: Closed
- Headquarters: Los Angeles, California, U.S.
- Area served: United States
- Parent: A24 (backing)
- Website: 2am.com

2AM was an American independent film production and management company founded in 2021 by Christine D'Souza Gelb, David Hinojosa, and Kevin Rowe. The company is best known for producing films such as Bodies Bodies Bodies (2022), The Starling Girl (2023), and Past Lives (2023).

== History ==
In February 2021, Christine D'Souza Gelb, David Hinojosa, and Kevin Rowe launched 2AM a production and management company with financial backing from A24. The company's first film Bodies Bodies Bodies directed by Halina Reijn was released in August 2022.

On the management side, the company represents Reijn, A.V. Rockwell, Janicza Bravo, Jeremy O. Harris, Sonoya Mizuno, Elegance Bratton, Laurel Parmet, Matt Spicer, and Adam Bessa among others.

On November 12, 2025, D'Souza Gelb announced that 2AM was ending and the trio were parting ways.

== Filmography ==
Release Date	Title	Notes	Ref
August 5, 2022	Bodies Bodies Bodies	distributed by A24	
May 12, 2023	The Starling Girl	co-production with Pinky Promise; distributed by Bleecker Street	
June 2, 2023	Past Lives	co-production with Killer Films and CJ ENM; distributed by A24	
September 6, 2024	The Front Room	co-production with Two & Two Pictures; distributed by A24	
September 20, 2024	Omni Loop	co-production with Lou Filmproduction; distributed by Magnolia Pictures	
December 25, 2024	Babygirl	co-production with Man Up Films; distributed by A24	
January 31, 2025	Love Me	co-production with ShivHans Pictures and AgX; distributed by Bleecker Street and ShivHans Pictures	
June 13, 2025	Materialists	co-production with Killer Films; distributed by A24 in the United States and Sony Pictures in select international territories	
January 30, 2026	The Moment	co-production with Studio365, Good World, and Atlantic Records; distributed by A24	

=== Upcoming ===
Release Date	Title	Notes	Ref
November 20, 2026	After This Death	co-production with Kindred Spirit; distributed by Sundance Now	
TBA	Straight Circle	co-production with Such Content, Magna Studios, BBC Film, Helekan Pictures, and Prospect Avenue; distributed by Joint Venture	
TBA	Love Is Not the Answer	co-production with Brookstreet Pictures, Mirador Pictures, Evania, IPR.VC and TPC	
TBA	My Darling California	co-production with Anton	
