= Shabier Kirchner =

Antiguan cinematographer and director

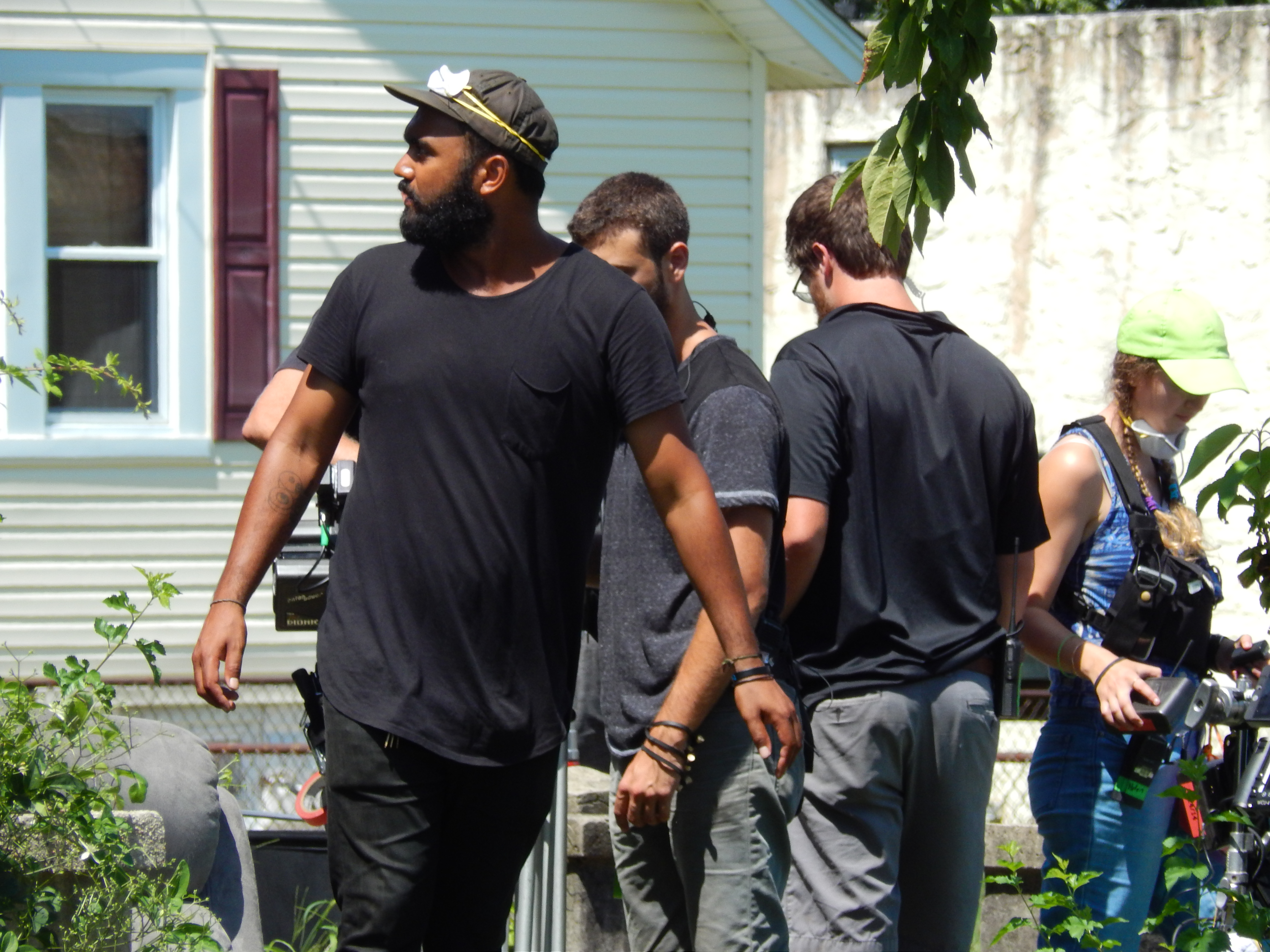
- Kirchner on the set of Sollers Point
- Born: 1987/1988
- Years active: 2010–present

Shabier Kirchner (born 1987/1988) is an Antiguan cinematographer and director based between London, New York, and the Caribbean. He won a BAFTA for his work on Steve McQueen's five-part anthology series Small Axe (2020).

== Early life ==
Kirchner grew up in the Falmouth Harbour area of Antigua island. He also spent some of his childhood in Germany, the home country of his father Bert, who owns the Papa Zouk Rum Shop in St. John's. Kirchner had undiagnosed dyslexia and ADHD growing up. Struggling academically, he was introduced to camera work through his father, an underwater photographer and producer, as well as through a school workshop with a Dutch filmmaker. At 18, Kirchner enrolled in an introductory program at a film school in Vancouver before opting to learn through practical experience instead, dropping out with four of his classmates, with whom he made the short film Memoirs of the Blue.

== Filmography ==
=== Short film ===
Year	Title	Director	Notes
2010	Memoirs of the Blue	Luke Hansen-MacDonald	Also writer and producer
2011	Ugly	Diego Siragna	Also producer
2014	Wanderer	Diego Siragna	Also producer
2015	I Am Selma	Yossera Bouchtia	
2015	Coke White, Starlight	Tristan Patterson	
2016	That One Day	Crystal Moselle	
2018	Dadli	Himself	Also producer
2018	Leaving Hope	Caspar Newbolt	
2021	Lizard	Akinola Davies	

=== Feature film ===
Year	Title	Director
2015	Throuple	Phillips Payson
2016	We've Forgotten More Than We Ever Knew	Thomas Woodrow
2017	Sollers Point	Matthew Porterfield
2018	Skate Kitchen	Crystal Moselle
2018	Only You	Harry Wootliff
2019	Bull	Annie Silverstein
2023	Past Lives	Celine Song
2025	Materialists	Celine Song
TBA	Carnation	Amiel Courtin-Wilson
TBA	Augustown	Himself
TBA	Enemies	Henry Dunham

=== Television ===
Year	Title	Director	Notes
2020	Small Axe	Steve McQueen	Miniseries
2024	Get Millie Black	Tanya Hamilton	Miniseries

== Awards and nominations ==
Year	Award	Category	Work	Result	Ref
2020	Independent Spirit Awards	Best Cinematography	Bull	Nominated	
2020	Boston Society of Film Critics Awards	Best Cinematography	Small Axe: "Lovers Rock"	Runner-up	
2020	New York Film Critics Circle Awards	Best Cinematography	Small Axe	Won	
2020	Chicago Film Critics Association Awards	Best Cinematography	Small Axe: "Lovers Rock"	Nominated	
2020	Florida Film Critics Circle Awards	Best Cinematography	Small Axe: "Lovers Rock"	Runner-up	
2020	Seattle Film Critics Society	Best Cinematography	Small Axe: "Lovers Rock"	Nominated	
2020	Los Angeles Film Critics Association Awards	Best Cinematography	Small Axe	Won	
2021	National Society of Film Critics Awards	Best Cinematography	Small Axe: "Lovers Rock"	Runner-up	
2021	British Academy Television Craft Awards	Best Photography & Lighting: Fiction	Small Axe	Won	
2021	Primetime Creative Arts Emmy Awards	Outstanding Cinematography for a Limited or Anthology Series or Movie	Small Axe: "Mangrove"	Nominated	
