= David Hinojosa =

American film producer

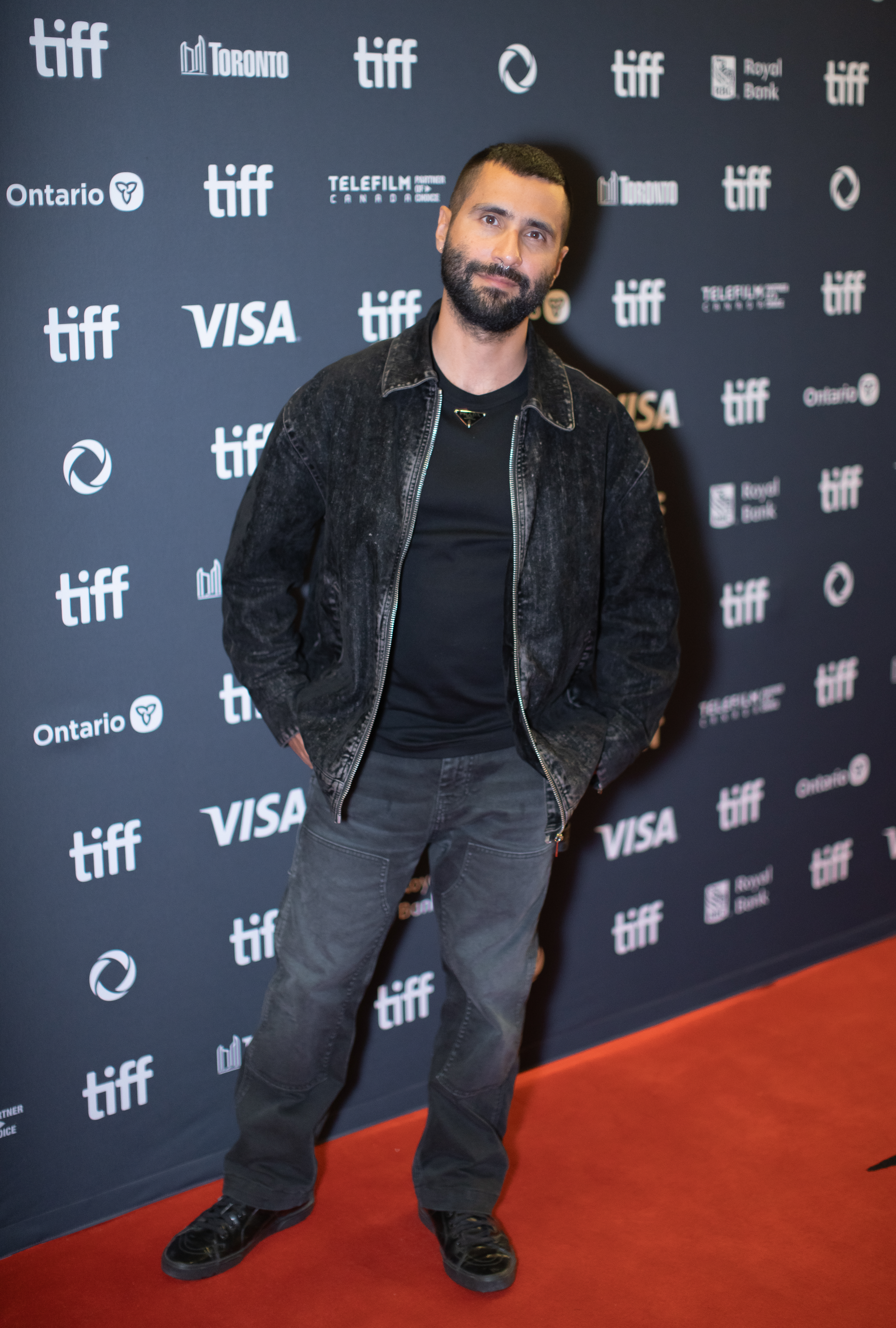
- Hinojosa in 2024
- Occupation: Film producer
- Years active: 2013–present

David Hinojosa is an American film producer who co-founded the studio 2AM with Christine D'Souza Gelb and Kevin Rowe. Hinojosa has produced Nasty Baby (2015), Beatriz at Dinner (2017), First Reformed (2017), Vox Lux (2018), Zola (2020), The World to Come (2020), Bodies Bodies Bodies (2022), Past Lives (2023), and Omni Loop (2024).

== Early life ==
Hinojosa was born and raised in Portage, Indiana. He is of Puerto Rican and Mexican descent.

== Career ==
Hinojosa previously worked at The Weinstein Company, focusing primarily on marketing campaigns for films such as Blue Valentine and The King's Speech. Hinojosa then worked at Killer Films, as head of development, and as an executive in charge of production on films including Carol directed by Todd Haynes. While at Killer, Hinojosa produced First Reformed directed by Paul Schrader, Zola directed by Janicza Bravo, both of which he was nominated for an Independent Spirit Award for Best Film.

In 2021, Hinojosa joined 2AM as a founding partner and head of production. In 2022 and 2024, Hinojosa produced Bodies Bodies Bodies and Babygirl both directed by Halina Reijn.

In 2023, Hinojosa produced Past Lives directed by Celine Song, for which he won an Gotham Independent Film Award for Best Feature, and received nominations for an Independent Spirit Award for Best Film, BAFTA Award for Best Film Not in the English Language, and Academy Award for Best Picture.

== Filmography ==
=== Film ===
Year	Film	Credit
2013	Kill Your Darlings	Associate producer
2013	Bluebird	Associate producer
2014	Mala Mala	Co-producer
2015	Nasty Baby	
2016	Wiener-Dog	Executive producer
2016	Goat	
2016	White Girl	Executive producer
2016	Frank & Lola	Executive producer
2016	Woman in Deep	Executive producer
2016	A Kind of Murder	Executive producer
2017	Dina	Co-producer
2017	Lemon	Executive producer
2017	Where Is Kyra?	
2017	Beatriz at Dinner	
2017	First Reformed	
2017	My Days of Mercy	
2018	Vox Lux	
2019	American Woman	Executive producer
2020	Zola	
2020	Shirley	
2020	The World to Come	
2020	Brothers by Blood	
2022	Bodies Bodies Bodies	
2022	Anything's Possible	
2023	Past Lives	
2023	The Starling Girl	Executive producer
2024	Omni Loop	
2024	The Front Room	
2024	Babygirl	
2024	The Brutalist	Executive producer
2025	After This Death	
2025	Materialists	
2026	The Moment	
TBA	Love Is Not the Answer	
TBA	Peaked	
TBA	My Darling California	
