= Untitled Arkasha Stevenson film =

- Directed by: Arkasha Stevenson
- Written by: Arkasha Stevenson; Tim Smith
- Produced by: Lars Knudsen; Emily Hildner; Tim Smith; Harrison Huffman; Christine D'Souza
- Starring: Josh Hutcherson; Caleb Landry Jones; Whitmer Thomas; Emma Corrin; Havana Rose Liu; Hunter Schafer; Sophie Wilde
- Cinematography: Alexander Dynan
- Production company: Square Peg
- Distributed by: A24
- Country: United States
- Language: English

Arkasha Stevenson is directing an upcoming American horror film from a screenplay she co-wrote with Tim Smith. It stars Josh Hutcherson, Caleb Landry Jones, Whitmer Thomas, Emma Corrin, Havana Rose Liu, Hunter Schafer, and Sophie Wilde. It is set to be released by A24.

== Cast ==
- Josh Hutcherson
- Caleb Landry Jones
- Whitmer Thomas
- Emma Corrin
- Havana Rose Liu
- Hunter Schafer
- Sophie Wilde
- Katelyn Rose Downey
- Fabien Frankel
- Suzanna Son
- Emory Cohen
- Wayne Brett

== Production ==
The film was announced on November 18, 2025, with Arkasha Stevenson set to direct from a screenplay she wrote with Tim Smith and Josh Hutcherson, Frank Dillane, Caleb Landry Jones, and Whitmer Thomas having entered negotiations to star. Two days later, Emma Corrin, Havana Rose Liu, Hunter Schafer, and Sophie Wilde joined the cast. By March 2026, Hutcherson, Jones, Thomas, Katelyn Rose Downey, Fabien Frankel, Suzanna Son, and Emory Cohen were all cast, while Dillane had dropped out. According to Deadline's Rosy Cordero, the film is set during "a bachelor party that spirals into terror".

Filming took place in Budapest, with filming in that country wrapping on April 14, 2026. At the Academy Museum of Motion Pictures' gala in October 2026, Schafer described the film as a "vampire movie" before acknowledging the project's secrecy.

== Release ==
The film is set to be released by A24.
