= Bernadette D'Souza =

Indian-American judge (born 1954)

- Born: 1954 (age 71–72); Goa, Portuguese India
- Citizenship: Portuguese (until 1961); Indian (formerly); American
- Education: University of Mumbai (BA) Psychology, 1976; Tulane University School of Law (JD), 1992
- Occupation: Judge on the civil district court in orleans parish
- Years active: 2012–present
- Predecessor: Judge Herbert Cade
- Political party: Democratic
- Website: orleanscivildistrictcourt.org/judge-dsouza

Bernadette D'Souza (born 1954; née Gomes) was elected to be the first Family Court judge on the Civil District Court in Orleans Parish. She is also the first female Indian-American judge in the state of Louisiana. D'Souza was born in Portuguese Goa, and received a degree in Psychology from the University of Bombay. She married Terrance D'Souza in 1978 and immigrated to the United States where they started their family. In 1989, D'Souza went back to school where entering Tulane University School of Law.

After law school, she worked for the New Orleans Legal Assistance Corporation in the domestic violence unit and then became the managing attorney at Southeast Louisiana Legal Services. After 18 years of working in public interest law, D'Souza was elected to the inaugural family court judgeship in the Civil District Court for the Parish of New Orleans as a part of a special election. She was re-elected for this seat in both 2014 and 2020. In 2021, Bernadette was elected the Chief Judge of Orleans Parish Civil District Court. She continues to be an active member of her community, advocating for victims of domestic violence.

== Early life and education ==
D’Souza was born in 1954 in Goa, India to Tony Gomes and Esmeralda Gomes. She was the eldest of eight. Her father was an accomplished musician in Bollywood which gave him the ability to put D’Souza into a convent boarding school. D’Souza went to college at the University of Mumbai where she met her future spouse, Terrence D'Souza. She was awarded with a honors degree in psychology and took a job in Tehran, Iran to support her family. In 1978 Terrence flew from the United States, where he was doing a residency at Tulane University Medical School, to Tehran and married Bernadette. Bernadette received a spousal visa three months later and joined him in New Orleans.

Together they had three children whom Bernadette stayed home and took care of. Within this period she became a US citizen in 1988. Once all of Bernadette's children were in school, Bernadette considered getting her doctorate in Clinical psychology but instead pursued her lifelong dream of becoming a lawyer. She was inspired by Indira Gandhi who was the first female prime minister of India. Bernadette joined Tulane University Law School in 1989 while continuing to support her family. During the summers D’Souza was a law school intern, which is where she gained a passion for domestic issues and helping those less fortunate. She graduated for Tulane University Law School in 1992.

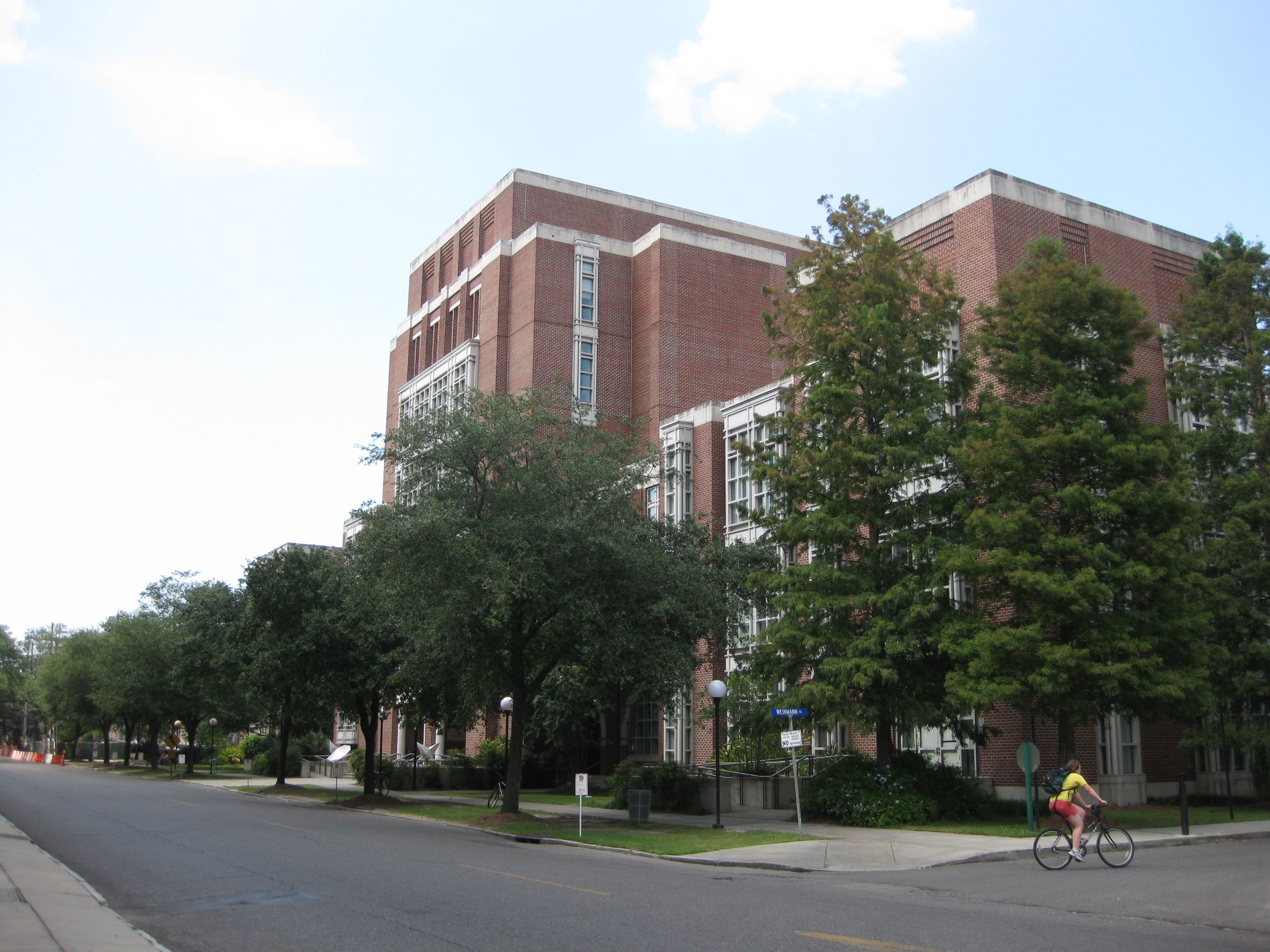
John Giffen Weinmann Hall, the Tulane University Law School building

== Early legal career ==
D’Souza's first job out of law school was as a staff attorney at the New Orleans Legal Assistance Corporation in the domestic violence unit. She then became the managing attorney at Southeast Louisiana Legal Services in 2005, which provides representation for indigent clients. There, she worked and managed cases in family law and domestic violence. She established a new unit dedicated to domestic violence. She also was for a time an adjunct professor at Tulane University Law School where she taught about domestic violence in the school's Domestic Violence Clinic.

In 2000 D'Souza was held at gunpoint outside the Gretna Courthouse with one of her clients by their abuser. This was after Bernadette had gotten a permanent injunction against him for her client. The man jumped out of a car and began shooting; D'Souza ran for help and turned to find a gun pointed at her. The man then turned the gun towards himself ending his life. This experience inspired Bernadette to take a larger role in becoming an advocate against domestic violence, leading her to pursue the bench. She served in public interest law for 18 years before successfully being elected to the bench, after having run unsuccessfully in 2004.

== Civil district court elections ==
=== 2004 ===
In 2004, Bernadette D'Souza ran for a judgeship on the Civil District Court of Orleans Parish, Division M. She ran against two other democratic candidates, Paulette Irons and Marie Williams. Paulette Irons had served on the Louisiana State Senate since 1994 up until her run for this election. D'Souza ran on a platform of creating specific sections of the Civil District Court dedicated to domestic issues, making sure they were taken as seriously as other matters. D'Souza lost this election to Irons, who has served on the court since her election in 2004. D'Souza received about 22% of the vote with Irons and Willams receiving about 65% and 13% respectively.

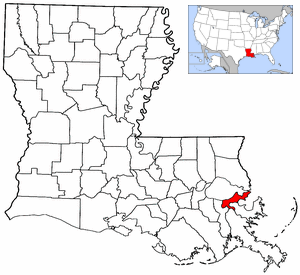
Orleans Parish Map

Nonpartisan primary for Orleans Parish Civil District Court, Division M Election, 18 September 2004
Party	Candidate	Vote %	Votes
Democratic	Bernadette D'Souza	21.79%	18,611
Democratic	Paulette Irons	64.80%	55,364
Democratic	Marie Williams	13.41%	11,456

=== 2012 ===
In 2012 Bernadette D'Souza ran for the position of the first Family court Judge in the Civil District Court for the Parish of New Orleans in a special election during March 2012. This position was one of two new specialty seats created by state law from the next two civil district court seat vacancies. These seats were meant to focus on domestic issues like paternity, divorce, custody, visitation and spousal support. The first seat was created by the election of Judge Herbert Cade to Traffic court. The special election was a partisan run by simple majority rule, in the state of Louisiana if a candidate does not receive a simple majority of all candidates on the ballot in the primary the top two candidates are then voted upon in a new general election. D'Souza ran against two other opponents, Janet Ahern and Kris Kiefer, for the seat. She had the support of Civil District Court clerk Dale Atkins, State Sen. Julie Quinn, State Rep. Austin Badon and put out a list of 400 plus endorsements of her campaign. Both opponents withdrew before the election, assuring her victory for the seat.

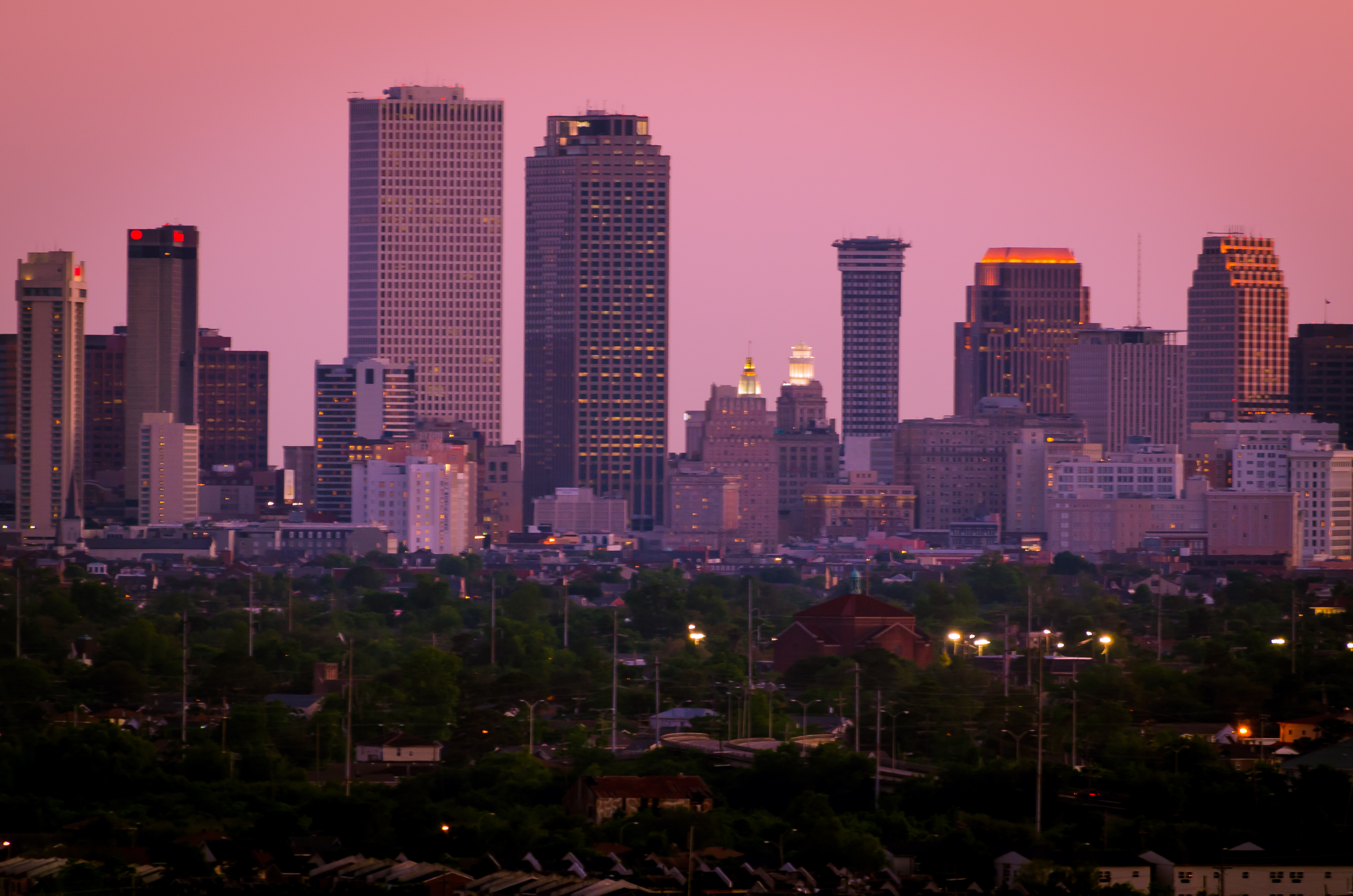
New Orleans Skyline

=== 2014 ===
D'Souza was re-elected in 2014 in a primary against Taetrece Harrison with 78% of the vote.

Nonpartisan primary for Orleans Parish Civil District Court, Division K, Domestic Section 1 Election, 4 November 2014
Party	Candidate	Vote %	Votes
Democratic	Bernadette D'Souza	77.98%	74,619
Democratic	Taetrece Harrison	22.02%	21,072

During this election she pledged to improve the office's community outreach, services for the underprivileged, and made pro se cases, those where clients defend themselves, an issue. Harrison's platform was on her more varied life and professional experience which made her better at judging cases that handle personal injury and bankruptcy claims and able to relate to family court clients as she was once surviving on child support. She also criticized D’Souza for using the mediation program too much and bringing up cost as a concern for struggling families.

=== 2020 ===
In 2020 D’Souza was re-elected again in a nonpartisan election against LaKeshia Jefferson with 52.8 percent of the vote.

Nonpartisan primary for Orleans Parish Civil District Court, Division K, Domestic Section 1 Election, 3 November 2020
Party	Candidate	Vote %	Votes
Democratic	Bernadette D'Souza	52.8%	79,769
Democratic	LaKeisha Jefferson	47.2%	71,221

D’Souza's platform was based on her own efforts in lobbying for specialized family courts and programs she had implemented to create the court she envisioned. Jefferson's platform was that there were too many delays in the court and that it could be far more efficient.

== Civil district court service ==
=== First term ===
In her first term D’Souza created a mediation program in cases that dealt with custody, clearing more off the courts docket while more civilly solving the issues outside of the courtroom. This program was based on what the families could afford with their income.

=== Chief justice ===
Judge D'Souza was elected to be the Chief justice of the Civil District Court for a two-year term by a vote of her peers on the court. Within this position she was tasked with supervising the administrative functions of the court.

=== Issues on the bench ===
==== Pro se litigation ====
D'Souza is concerned with the fact that a majority of litigants in domestic courts are pro se, this means that they are representing themselves in the court. These people are often without the resources to handle their cases and need the assistance of an already stressed legal services system. She believes this is a major issue because individuals who do not have the resources to acquire legal representation do not have equal access to justice. To combat this issue, Judge D'Souza created a self-help desk in her court and connects individuals with lawyers doing pro bono work to help them fill out paperwork and petitions.

==== Weapons on violent offenders ====
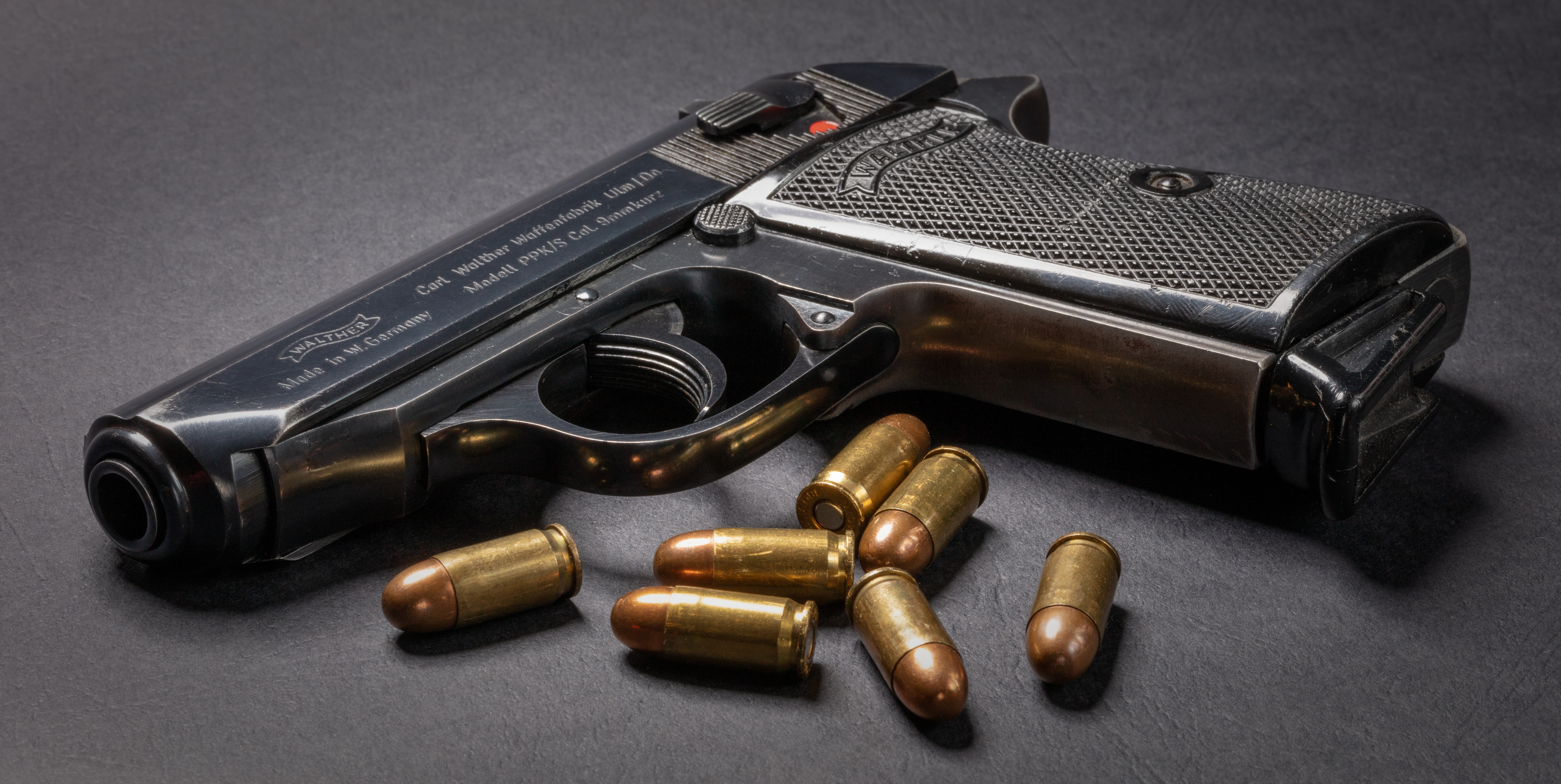
Firearm

D'Souza is also concerned with taking away weapons from domestic violence offenders. She has her deputy confiscate weapons from households when it is proved that domestic violence is occurring. She was a supporter of a set of laws passed in 2018, one of which restricted the ability of people with convictions of misdemeanor domestic abuse to have firearms for 10 years. This also applied to individuals with protective orders against them. D'Souza has been enforcing these laws in her court and is part of the effort to normalize the enforcement within the Parrish.

=== Key cases ===
==== Jammall Breaux v. Devin Tipton (2018) ====
In March 2018, D'Souza granted a protective order against the defendant Devin Tipton filed by Jammall Breaux for the protection of minor child J.B. Mr. Tipton was J.B.'s stepfather and the protective order was granted due to reported domestic violence against J.B. and his mother Mrs. Tipton. This case began with Mr. Breaux petitioning for a temporary restraining order which was granted. This restraining order was taken to trial court to decide whether the restraining order would be made into a protective order. Testimony showed that J.B. had reported to both his father and teachers domestic violence in the home against him and his mother. Incidents of J.B. being whipped and witnessing his stepfather threaten to kill his mother were cited. Additionally concerns about stability particularly in schooling and excessive absences were noted. Judge D'Souza granted the protective order to protect the safety of the child, ending the abuse the child witnessed and was subjected to.

==== Vijayendra Jaligam v. Radhika Pochampally (2016) ====
In 2016 D'Souza awarded temporary sole custody to Dr. Jaligam and suspend Dr. Pochampally's communication with her children until she received therapy and was given authority by the court. Dr. Jaligam and Pochampally were divorced in 2008 and came to an agreement on custody which Pochampally was found in contempt of multiple times, barring Dr. Jaligam's visitation of their children. In 2015 it was ruled that due to Dr. Pochampally's willful disregard of the court's rulings, Dr. Jaligam was made the domiciliary parent and then eventually was awarded sole custody in connection with an issue that occurred during a Christmas visit the children had with their father.

== Professional associations ==
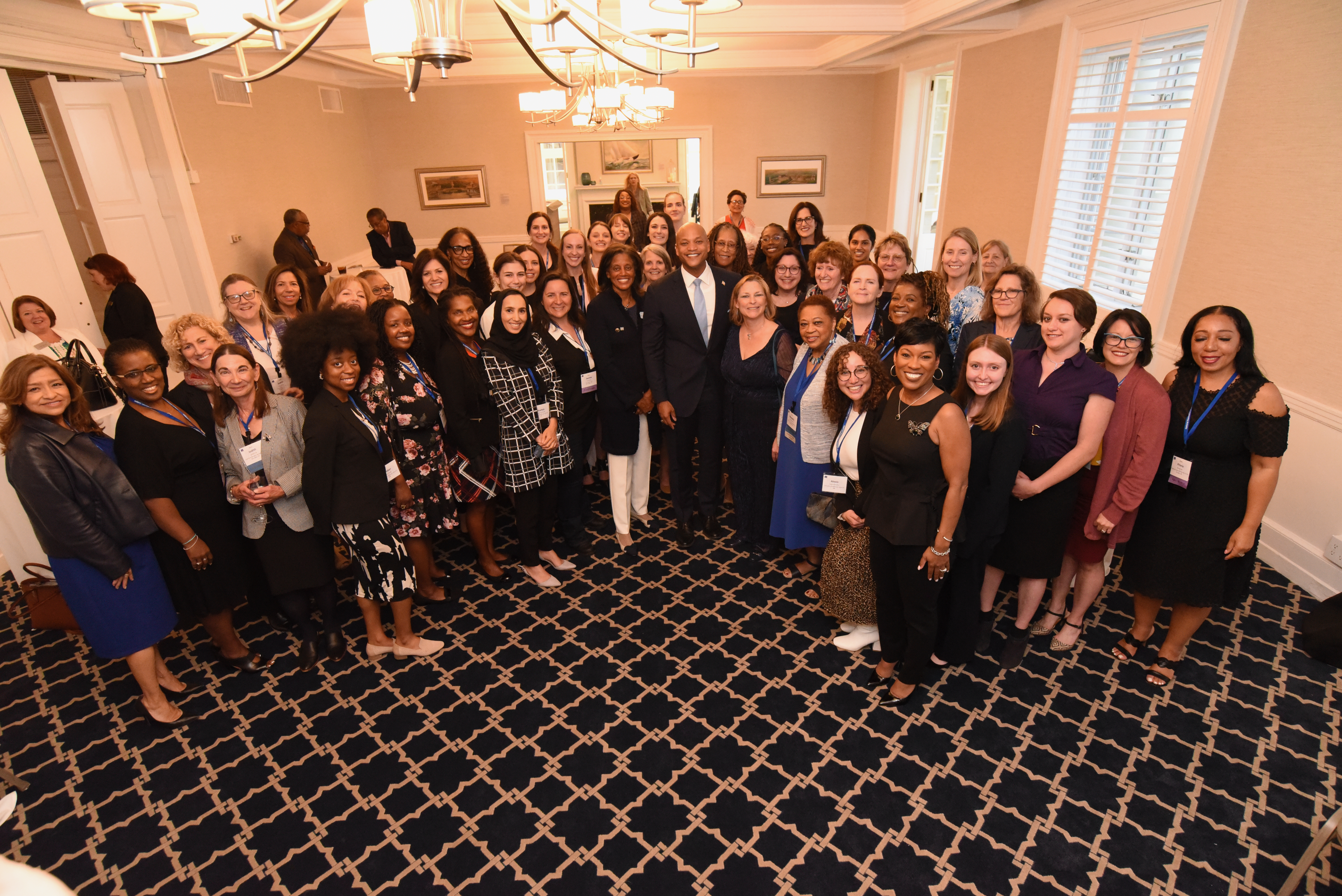
National Association of Women Judges Event

=== Past memberships ===
- President of the Tulane University Women's Association
- President of Greater New Orleans YMCA,
- board member of the Institute for Mental Hygiene
- chairman of the board of the WRBH
- Auxiliary of the American Academy of Neurology
- District Director, Co-chair of the Domestic Violence Committee, Executive Director Search Committee, Secretary in 2017, President in 2019 of the National Association of Women Judges

American Bar Association, Defending Liberty Pursuing Justice

=== Current memberships ===
- New Orleans Bar Association
- Louisiana State Bar Association
- American Bar Association
- A.P Tureaud Inn of Court
- Martinet Legal Society
- Association for Women Attorneys
- Committee on Bar Admissions
- Self Represented Litigants Task Force
- National Association of Women Judges
- Fellow of the American Bar Foundation
- Louisiana Bar Foundation
- Mayoral Appointee on the Board of Total Community Action
- President of the St. Thomas More Catholic Lawyers Association.

== Awards ==
2023 AJA Annual Conference Louisiana Honorees

- Career Public Interest Award from the Louisiana State Bar Association, 2008
- Woman of the Year award by New Orleans CityBusiness, 2011
- City Business Icon Award in honor of New Orleans’ 300th anniversary, 2018
- Judge Libby Hines Domestic Violence Award, 2023
- St. Mark Missionary Baptist Church's Humanitarian Award
- YMCA Role Model Award
- Citizen Hero Award from Victims
- Citizens Against Crime Award
- Louisiana Coalition Against Domestic Violence into Action Award
- Association for Women Attorneys’ Professionalism Award
- New Orleans Pro Bono Project's Distinguished Jurist Award
- National Association of Women Judges Justice Vaino Spencer Leadership Award.

== Personal life ==
In 2019, after 41 years of marriage, D'Souza's husband Dr. Terence D'Souza, a neurologist at the Ochsner Clinic, died of a heart attack leaving behind their three children and three grandsons.

== See also ==
- Women in the United States judiciary
- Louisiana district courts
