= Babygirl =

2024 film by Halina Reijn

- Theatrical release poster
- Directed by: Halina Reijn
- Written by: Halina Reijn
- Produced by: David Hinojosa; Halina Reijn; Julia Oh
- Starring: Nicole Kidman; Harris Dickinson; Sophie Wilde; Antonio Banderas
- Cinematography: Jasper Wolf
- Edited by: Matthew Hannam
- Music by: Cristobal Tapia de Veer
- Production companies: A24; 2AM; Man Up Films
- Distributed by: A24
- Release dates: August 30, 2024 (Venice); December 25, 2024 (United States)
- Running time: 115 minutes
- Country: United States
- Language: English
- Budget: $20 million
- Box office: $64.7 million

Babygirl is a 2024 American erotic thriller film written, directed, and produced by Halina Reijn. The film stars Nicole Kidman as a high-powered CEO who puts her career and family on the line when she begins an affair with a much younger intern (Harris Dickinson). Sophie Wilde and Antonio Banderas also star.

Babygirl premiered at the 81st Venice International Film Festival on August 30, 2024, where Kidman won the Volpi Cup for Best Actress, followed by a premiere at the 2024 Toronto International Film Festival on September 10, 2024, with a wide theatrical release by A24 on December 25, 2024. It received positive reviews and became a box office success, grossing $64.7 million on a $20 million budget. It was named one of the top ten films of 2024 by the National Board of Review, where Kidman was also awarded the Best Actress prize.

== Plot ==
Romy Mathis, the CEO of a robotic process automation company in New York City, is dissatisfied with her sex life with her husband, theater director Jacob. She is almost attacked by a loose dog on the way to work but a young man named Samuel intervenes. He turns out to be an intern at Romy's company, who picks her as his mentor through the company's mentorship program. When Samuel propositions Romy during a private meeting, she hesitantly gives in and kisses him. Conflicted about the incident, the two later meet at a hotel. Romy expresses concern she may be taking advantage of Samuel due to their power imbalance, but Samuel retorts that he has the power to get her fired "with just one phone call". During the ensuing sexual encounter Samuel plays the role of a dominant partner. Romy is deeply conflicted about her enjoyment of the experience, but their sexual affair becomes prolonged and intense.

Samuel continues to push boundaries. He appears at Romy and Jacob's country home, ingratiating himself with the entire family under the pretense of returning a laptop Romy left at the office. Feeling disrespected, Romy orders Samuel to never show up at her home again. When Samuel threatens to request a transfer to a different department, Romy realizes it could lead to uncomfortable questions about their relationship. Romy's stress continues to build, and she admits to Jacob she has never experienced an orgasm with him. She convinces Samuel to continue their affair by promising submission. Samuel appears at her house uninvited during her daughter Nora's birthday party, accompanied by Esmée, Romy's executive assistant, whom he is dating.

Esmée, aware of Romy's affair with Samuel, implores her to end it, since there are few high-ranking women in the company and Romy should be a respectable role model. Romy confesses her infidelity to Jacob, but describes it as a one-night stand with a stranger. Attempts to express her sexual needs are overshadowed by her confession and he doesn't hear her. Romy retreats to their country house. Jacob arrives later, finds her talking with Samuel, and they fight. Jacob likens female masochism to neurosis or male construct, Samuel calls that a dated idea, and Jacob has a panic attack. Samuel calms Jacob down with an embrace then leaves. Encouraged by her teenage daughter Isabel, Romy decides to reconcile with Jacob. Romy learns Samuel has taken a new job in Japan. A board member implies he knows about the affair and invites Romy to his own house. Romy refuses. Romy and Jacob, with rekindled romance, reenact the type of rough sex that Samuel introduced Romy to. She climaxes while fantasizing about Samuel.

== Cast ==
- Nicole Kidman as Romy Mathis, a CEO, Jacob's wife, Isabel and Nora's mother, and Samuel's employer and lover
- Harris Dickinson as Samuel, Romy's intern and lover
- Antonio Banderas as Jacob Mathis, a theatre director, Romy's husband, and Isabel and Nora's father
- Sophie Wilde as Esmée Smith, Romy's assistant
- Esther McGregor as Isabel Mathis, Romy and Jacob's daughter, and Nora's older sister
- Vaughan Reilly as Nora Mathis, Romy and Jacob's daughter, and Isabel's younger sister
- Victor Slezak as Sebastian Missel, a board member
- Leslie Silva as Hazel, an executive
- Gaite Jansen as Hedda/Scarlett
- Robert Farrior as Brack/Stephen
- Bartley Booz as Tom
- Anoop Desai as Robert
- Dolly Wells as a therapist
- Maxwell Whittington-Cooper as Josh

== Production ==
=== Development ===
It was announced in November 2023 that David Hinojosa of 2AM was going to produce the project alongside Halina Reijn of Man Up Films, with A24 financing the project. Julia Oh, Zach Nutman, and Christine D'Souza Gelb of 2AM served as executive producers. It was later revealed that Julia Oh would take on the producer role, contrary to earlier reports that she would serve as an executive producer. In addition to her role as producer, Halina Reijn directed the film from a screenplay she wrote. The project marked Reijn's second English-language feature film, both produced by A24.

The original plan was to make a summer movie; however, it was changed to Christmas due to the impact of the 2023 WGA strike and 2023 SAG-AFTRA strike on the film's schedule. The film's workplace dynamics were influenced by cinematic elements from Indecent Proposal and Basic Instinct. The affair in the film was set in an American workplace because the stricter hierarchy and rules in the U.S. compared to Europe was felt by the filmmaker to make such a relationship feel even more forbidden and taboo.

Reijn was inspired to write the script after hearing about a woman who had never experienced an orgasm throughout her 25-year marriage. She added that her interest in exploring women's relationships with their bodies was a key motivator for making this movie. She also credited her passion for the erotic thrillers of the 1980s and 1990s, particularly those by directors Paul Verhoeven and Adrian Lyne, as the inspirational driving force behind her decision to make this film. Lizzy Talbot was hired as the intimacy coordinator.

The film features a significant 24-year age gap between its lead characters, with Romy written as 49 and Samuel as 25. However, the real-life age difference between Nicole Kidman (56 during filming) and Harris Dickinson (27) was even greater. Reijn emphasized the importance of normalizing age gaps in relationships, particularly when women are the older partners, stating, "It should completely be normalized that the age gaps switch and that women have different relationships. We're not trapped in a box anymore." Dickinson noted that the limited pre-filming interaction between him and Kidman ultimately benefited the project, as it allowed them to build trust and work together with kindness, enhancing the authenticity of their on-screen dynamic.

Kidman and Reijn built a strong bond while preparing for the film in New York, fostering trust and openness. They worked closely, revising scenes and sharing personal stories, creating a collaborative, intimate environment. Kidman credits Reijn's supportive approach for helping her embrace the emotional and physical vulnerability required for the role.

=== Casting ===
In November 2023, Kidman, Dickinson, Antonio Banderas, Sophie Wilde, and Jean Reno were announced as part of the cast. Other cast members included John Cenatiempo, Vaughan Reilly, Victor Slezak, Anoop Desai, and Maxwell Whittington-Cooper. Esther McGregor was reported to star.

=== Filming ===
Principal photography began in December 2023 in New York City, and wrapped in February 2024.

=== Music ===
On December 2, 2024, Sky Ferreira announced the release of "Leash", a song written and co-produced by her for the soundtrack of the film. The film score was composed by Cristobal Tapia de Veer and was released digitally on December 25, 2024, through A24 Music.

The film features INXS's 1988 single "Never Tear Us Apart". A24 struggled to secure the rights to the track, which Reijn complained about to Kidman, who personally secured the rights within "a couple of days".

George Michael's 1987 song "Father Figure" recharted on the UK Singles Downloads Chart (No. 71) and UK singles chart (No. 73) after being prominently featured in the film.

== Release ==
=== Theatrical ===
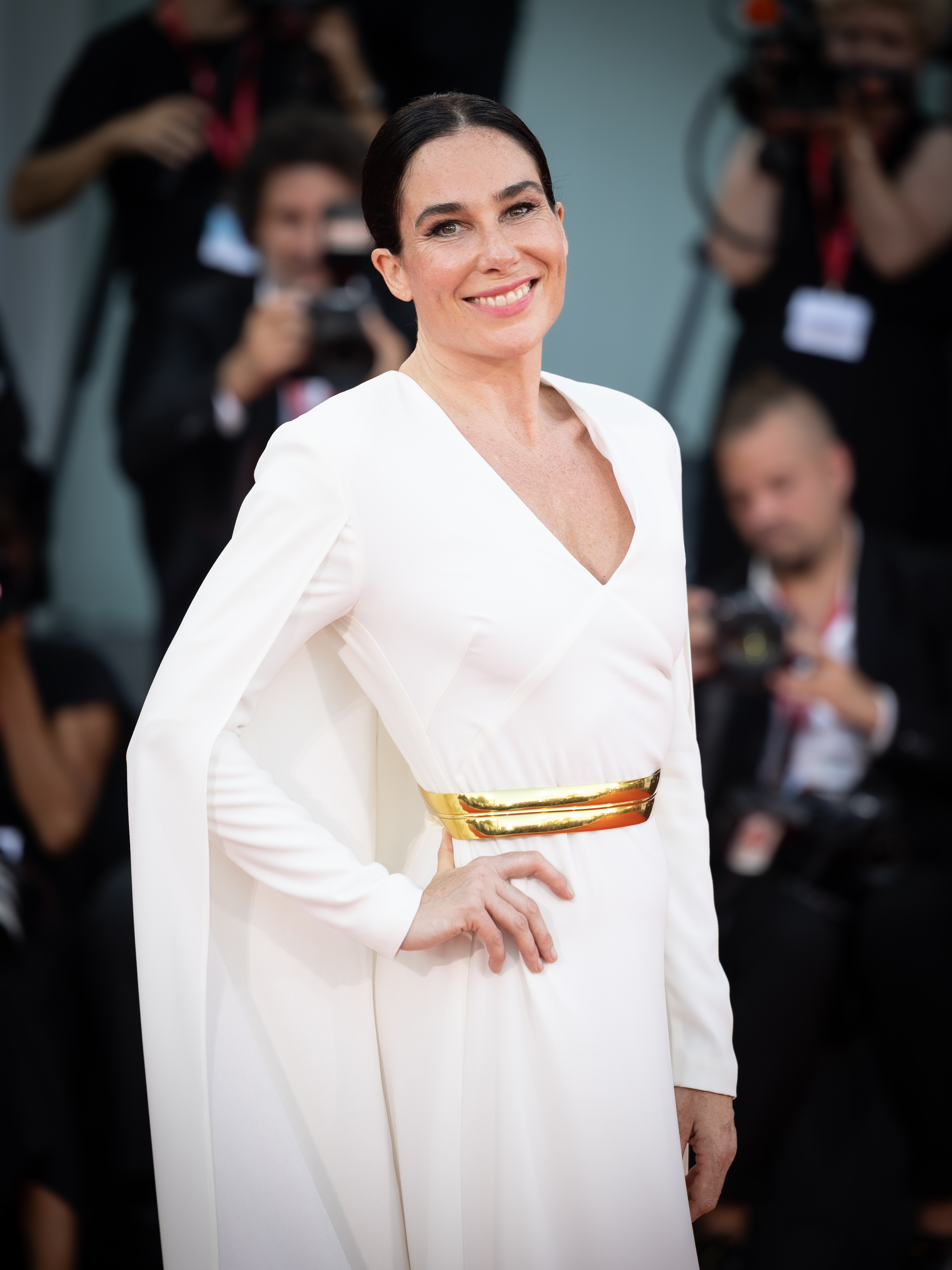
Writer and director Halina Reijn during the presentation of the film at the Venice International Film Festival

Babygirl premiered at the 81st Venice International Film Festival on August 30, 2024. Following this, it was also premiered at the 49th Toronto International Film Festival on September 10, 2024. The film was initially set for a release in the United States and Canada on December 20, 2024, but the date was later shifted to December 25, 2024, for its theatrical debut.

=== Home media ===
Babygirl was released in the United States on VOD on January 28, 2025. The film was released on Max on April 25, 2025. The movie was released on Blu-ray and 4K from A24 on March 18, 2025.

== Reception ==
=== Box office ===
Babygirl has grossed $28.1 million in the United States and Canada, and $36.5 million in other territories, for a total of $64.7 million worldwide. The film's break-even point was reported around $50 million.

In the United States and Canada, Babygirl was released alongside Nosferatu, A Complete Unknown, and The Fire Inside, and was projected to gross around $7 million from 2,115 theaters in its five-day opening weekend. The film made $1.5 million on its first day and then $1.3 million on its second. It went on to debut to $4.4 million in its opening weekend (and a total of $7.3 million over the five days), finishing in seventh place. It then made $1.4 million on the first day of 2025, for a total of $10.5 million over its first eight days of release. The film enjoyed a stronghold in its second weekend, dropping just 0.5% to $4.5 million. It fell by 31% and earned $3.1 million, finishing eighth in its third weekend with a reduction in theaters. The film dropped only 36% and earned a solid $1.9 million, finishing eleventh in the fourth weekend despite losing 427 theaters and playing across just 1,460 theaters.

In the U.K. and Ireland, where the film was released on January 10, 2025, it made $5.1 million from January 3–February 6, 2025, and placed eighth. The film achieved strong performance in international markets, with notable success in countries such as Ukraine, the Netherlands, Denmark, Poland, Romania, France, Spain, Belgium, and Luxembourg.

=== Home media performance ===
In its debut week on PVOD in the U.S., the film was the top-rented title, placing third on iTunes and sixth on Fandango. It placed eighth on iTunes for the second week.

=== Critical response ===
On the review aggregator website Rotten Tomatoes, 76% of 257 critics' reviews are positive, with an average rating of 6.9/10. The website's consensus reads: "Nicole Kidman and Harris Dickinson memorably smolder together in Babygirl, with writer-director Halina Reijn's clinical gaze keeping this sexually frank thriller more provocative than prurient." Metacritic, which uses a weighted average, assigned the film a score of 79 out of 100, based on 55 critics, indicating "generally favorable" reviews. Audiences polled by CinemaScore gave the film an average grade of "B–" on an A+ to F scale, while those surveyed by PostTrak gave it a 67% overall positive score, with 38% saying they would "definitely recommend" it.

Michelle Goldberg of The New York Times observed that "On the cusp of our terrible new era, it felt, for all its darkness and perversity, like an artifact of a more optimistic moment, when equality seemed close enough at hand that the orgasm gap between men and women – something the movie's director, Halina Reijn, often talks about in interviews – could be a subject of serious concern." Damon Wise of Deadline Hollywood praised the performance of Kidman as "[she] really goes the distance, imbuing Romy with a psychological vulnerability that is missing from the film it most obviously sounds like (Fifty Shades of Grey) and presenting a unique reversal of the film it most obviously looks like (Secretary)." He also mentioned Dickinson's performance as "an inspired piece of casting, manifesting like a monster from the id with his dorky, knife-and-fork haircut and clothes that he appears to have put on with a shovel." Nicholas Barber of the BBC lauded Reijn's gritty, indie-style direction in Babygirl, highlighting how she avoids the usual Hollywood neo-noir gloss, choosing instead to expose the raw, unpolished truth behind moments like the intern's arrival at the family's retreat or the co-worker's discovery of the affair. Barber also praised Kidman for delivering a bold and captivating performance, describing it as one of her most daring and impactful in years.

David Rooney of The Hollywood Reporter called out the film as "sexy, dark and unpredictable" and praised the cast's performance. He mentioned Dickinson was "a magnetic screen presence", Kidman was "in spectacular form, swinging from outrage to fear to ravenously lustful consent", Wilde brought "sly notes of humor". Richard Lawson of Vanity Fair praised the overall film as "Reijn creates the sense that we are watching test subjects through a two-way mirror. This doesn't necessarily make the proceedings any less interesting. But one does maybe crave a bit more heat from a movie that is so willing to tackle intimate matters."

In a more critical review, Xan Brooks of The Guardian stated, "for all its excited carnality and seesawing power struggles, the film's thrills feel machine-tooled and vacuum-packed. Babygirl rolls off the track looking almost as neat and anonymous as a box from Tensile's [the fictional tech company] upstate delivery warehouse." However, he commended Kidman's "bright, bold performance" as it "carries a top-note of distress, as though she is not entirely convinced by everything she's signed up for." In contrast, Owen Gleiberman of Variety praised the overall film as "a shrewdly honest and entertaining movie about a flagrantly 'wrong' sadomasochistic affair" and he termed Kidman's performance "fearless". He later concluded that Kidman had given the best performance by a female actor in 2024.

Robbie Collin of The Telegraph praised the film, noting that it "is sharp enough – and hot enough." He highlighted Nicole Kidman's performance as "ferociously good, convincing utterly as this formerly level-headed careerist whose deeply buried, long-denied appetites are simultaneously proving her making and downfall." Alison Willmore of Vulture described the film as "a self-love story," emphasizing that part of its message is about the importance of allowing oneself to be vulnerable and to "let yourself be small for a while." Glenn Kenny of RogerEbert.com praised Kidman's performance but the film itself did not convince him: "Kidman has garnered kudos for an uninhibited and daring performance, but when has she ever shied away from uninhibited and daring performances? I love to see them always, but I love to see them even more in good movies." Kevin Maher of The Times mentioned that "The ending, like the best BDSM experiences (they say), is slightly contrived but very satisfying."

Radhika Seth of Vogue acknowledged that the film is not for everyone, dividing critics and even premiere attendees. However, she praised Antonio Banderas, Nicole Kidman, Halina Reijn, and Cristobal Tapia de Veer for their standout contributions to the film. Ben Croll of TheWrap said that despite hints at deeper themes and narratives, the film stands out for its surprising absence of cynicism. Martin Tsai of Collider noted that while the film does elicit some laughs, whether intentional or not, it ultimately feels more demeaning for Nicole Kidman than Dogville. He pointed out that Catherine Breillat had already addressed similar themes more skillfully in Last Summer, and criticized Reijn for lacking the nuance needed to elevate the film into something more meaningful.

Stephanie Zacharek of Time called out that this was one of Kidman's finest performances in a long career of more than 40 years, while Carla Meyer of Los Angeles Times considered Kidman's performance Oscar worthy. Concurred with that, Peter Travers of ABC News mentioned that "Kidman's daring is now the stuff of legend". Nick Schager of The Daily Beast mentioned that the film featured a standout performance from Kidman as a woman on a daring quest for self-discovery and fulfillment, and delivered a bold and entertaining cinematic jolt. Richard Roeper of Chicago Sun-Times praised Banderas's performance as he served as a steady presence, with a standout moment later in the story showcasing his formidable acting prowess.

Filmmaker John Waters named it as one of his favorite films of 2024, giving particular praise to Kidman's performance.

=== Accolades ===
The film appeared on multiple filmmakers, critics and editors' lists of the best films of 2024, including:

- 1st - Time
- 3rd - Vincent Perella of IndieWire
- 4th - Tim Dams of Screen Daily
- 4th - Ben Dalton of Screen Daily
- 7th - Jon Frosch of The Hollywood Reporter
- 8th - Owen Gleiberman of Variety
- 8th - Marshall Shaffer of Slant Magazine
- 8th - Harper's Bazaar
- 9th - John Waters
- 9th - Nicholas Barber and Caryn James of BBC
- 10th - Dazed
- Top 10 film (listed alphabetically) - David Ehrlich of IndieWire
- Top 10 film (listed alphabetically) - Veronica Flores of IndieWire
- Top 10 film - National Post
- 20th - Screen Rant
- 22nd - Glamour
- 29th - IndieWire
- One of the best movies of 2024 - Vogue
- One of the best movies of 2024 - Elle
- One of the best movies of 2024 - The Economist

The film score was also on the shortlist for 2024 Academy Award for Best Original Score. Nicole Kidman and Harris Dickinson were recognized in the 2024 BAFTA Longlists for Best Actress in a Leading Role and Best Actor in a Supporting Role, respectively. Kidman and Dickinson were also named one of the best performances in film in 2024 by Rolling Stone and IndieWire, respectively.

=== Awards and nominations ===
Award	Date of ceremony	Category	Recipient(s)	Result	Ref.
Venice International Film Festival	September 7, 2024	Golden Lion	Halina Reijn	Nominated	
Venice International Film Festival	September 7, 2024	Volpi Cup for Best Actress	Nicole Kidman	Won	
Gotham Awards	December 2, 2024	Best Feature	Halina Reijn, David Hinojosa, and Julia Oh	Nominated	
Gotham Awards	December 2, 2024	Outstanding Lead Performance	Nicole Kidman	Nominated	
National Board of Review Awards	December 4, 2024	Best Actress	Nicole Kidman	Won	
National Board of Review Awards	December 4, 2024	Top Ten Films	Babygirl	Won	
Michigan Movie Critics Guild	December 9, 2024	Best Actress	Nicole Kidman	Nominated	
Phoenix Critics Circle	December 12, 2024	Best Actress	Nicole Kidman	Nominated	
New York Film Critics Online	December 16, 2024	Best Actress	Nicole Kidman	Nominated	
IndieWire Critics Poll	December 16, 2024	Best Performance	Nicole Kidman	6th place	
Dallas–Fort Worth Film Critics Association	December 18, 2024	Best Actress	Nicole Kidman	5th place	
Florida Film Critics Circle	December 20, 2024	Best Actress	Nicole Kidman	Nominated	
Palm Springs International Film Festival	January 3, 2025	International Star Award	Nicole Kidman	Won	
Palm Springs International Film Festival	January 3, 2025	Directors to Watch	Halina Reijn	Won	
Golden Globe Awards	January 5, 2025	Best Actress in a Motion Picture – Drama	Nicole Kidman	Nominated	
Austin Film Critics Association	January 6, 2025	Best Actress	Nicole Kidman	Nominated	
Music City Film Critics Association	January 10, 2025	Best Actress	Nicole Kidman	Nominated	
AARP Movies for Grownups Awards	January 11, 2025	Best Actress	Nicole Kidman	Nominated	
North Dakota Film Society	January 13, 2025	Best Actress	Nicole Kidman	Nominated	
Portland Critics Association	January 14, 2025	Best Actress	Nicole Kidman	Nominated	
Pittsburgh Film Critics Association	January 15, 2025	Best Score	Cristobal Tapia de Veer	Runner-up	
Women Film Critics Circle	January 15, 2025	Best Actress	Nicole Kidman	Nominated	
Satellite Awards	January 26, 2025	Best Actress – Motion Picture Drama	Nicole Kidman	Nominated	
Annual Girls On Film Awards	January 26, 2025	Female Orgasm on Screen Sponsored by Intimacy on Set	Nicole Kidman	Won	
London Film Critics' Circle	February 2, 2025	Actress of the Year	Nicole Kidman	Nominated	
AACTA International Awards	February 7, 2025	Best Actress	Nicole Kidman	Won	
International Cinephile Society	February 9, 2025	Best Actress	Nicole Kidman	Nominated	
Santa Barbara International Film Festival	February 9, 2025	Virtuoso Award	Harris Dickinson	Won	
Dorian Awards	February 13, 2025	Film Performance of the Year	Nicole Kidman	Nominated	

== Cultural impact ==
The film helped revive the popularity of George Michael's "Father Figure". Kidman humorously recreated the milk scene during her acceptance speech for Best Actress at the National Board of Review Awards. At the 2025 Critics Choice Awards, Chelsea Handler and Ralph Fiennes brought a touch of dairy and homage to the ceremony by also recreating the milk-scene moment. Many fans of the film recreated moments on social media such as Dickinson dancing to George Michael's "Father Figure", or Kidman being commanded to stand in the corner before lying on the floor.

Initially popular with older women, its audience has expanded to nearly equal gender representation. In Spain, it has sparked discussions on mature female representation, while in Ukraine and Denmark, mental health professionals use it to explore female sexuality and aging. The film offered a fresh perspective, standing out amidst the wave of #MeToo-themed content that has dominated recent years. The film added to the evolving portrayal of older women in cinema, challenging the stereotypical "bitter older woman" trope. This shift aligned with a broader trend in recent films that focus on characters over 40, offering more nuanced and diverse representations.

The cover of Sabrina Carpenter's 2025 album Man's Best Friend shows the singer on her knees, acting like a dog: this controversial picture has been associated to the scene where Kidman is on all fours in Babygirl.
