= Omni Loop =

2024 film by Bernardo Britto

- Theatrical release poster
- Directed by: Bernardo Britto
- Screenplay by: Bernardo Britto
- Produced by: Benjamin Cohen; Patrick Donovan; David Hinojosa
- Starring: Mary-Louise Parker; Ayo Edebiri; Carlos Jacott; Chris Witaske; Hannah Pearl Utt; Harris Yulin
- Cinematography: Ava Benjamin Shorr
- Edited by: Bernardo Britto; Martin Anderson
- Music by: Kaitlyn Aurelia Smith
- Production companies: Lou Filmproduction; 2AM
- Distributed by: Magnolia Pictures
- Release dates: March 13, 2024 (SXSW); September 20, 2024 (United States)
- Running time: 107 minutes
- Country: United States
- Language: English
- Box office: $40,269

Omni Loop is a 2024 American science fiction drama film written, directed, and edited by Bernardo Britto. It stars Mary-Louise Parker, Ayo Edebiri, Carlos Jacott, Harris Yulin (in his final film appearance before his death in June 2025), Hannah Pearl Utt, Chris Witaske, and Steven Maier.

Omni Loop had its world premiere at South by Southwest on March 13, 2024. It was released in theaters by Magnolia Pictures on September 20, 2024.

== Plot ==
Zoya Lowe is a quantum physics textbook author with only one week left to live. She is diagnosed with a black hole growing in her chest. To avoid her death, Zoya enters a time loop. She takes a time travel pill that allows her to travel back in time 5 days. She found these mysterious pills when she was 12 years old and had used them to improve her life, but stopped for many years before her diagnosis.

Frustrated with repeating the same sad loop with her husband, adult daughter and son-in-law, she decides to take action and resume her past research on the pills. She meets Paula, a research assistant studying time at a local community college, and enlists her help. Zoya hopes to find a way to travel back to gain years and potentially alter her past.

Once Zoya begins working with Paula, she spends every cycle sneaking out of the hospital and hiding from her worried family. As the research continues unsuccessfully, Zoya is upset, but refuses to reach out to past colleague and ex Mark Harrison. When Zoya, in a last ditch effort, tracks him down, she finds that he died four months before. His son, now living in his dad's house, invites her in and says he wishes that his dad hadn't spent his last days working.

After this, Zoya listens to the voicemails her family have been leaving every cycle and breaks down in tears, resetting her week one final time. This time she is happy to be in the loop repeating things she's done with her family while still creating new memories. She also stops by Paula's to give her a copy of all the research they had done together and the time travel pills. Zoya says that maybe Paula is the one to figure it all out.

As the loop is coming to a close, Zoya's family bring her out a birthday cake, but unlike any loops in the past Zoya opens her gift. She is shocked to find a photo of her daughter's sonogram. Zoya is going to be a grandmother. She smiles and tells her family how much she loves them before the black hole consumes her.

== Themes ==
The film explores Zoya’s reflection on her life, the missed opportunities, her family, her career, and what matters most. The time travel is a vehicle to consider alternative lives and the grief of knowing one’s end is near.

== Cast ==
- Mary-Louise Parker as Zoya Lowe
- Ayo Edebiri as Paula Campos
- Carlos Jacott as Donald Lowe
- Harris Yulin as Professor Dulseberg
- Eddie Cahill as Mark Harrison
- Hannah Pearl Utt as Jayne Lowe
- Chris Witaske as Morris
- Steven Maier as Chris

== Production ==
The screenplay was selected for the 2017 Sundance Institute Screenwriting Lab. In June 2023, the film received finishing funds for post-production from Amazon Studios (now Amazon MGM Studios) and Los Angeles Latino International Film Festival.

Principal photography took place in Miami in September 2022.

== Release ==
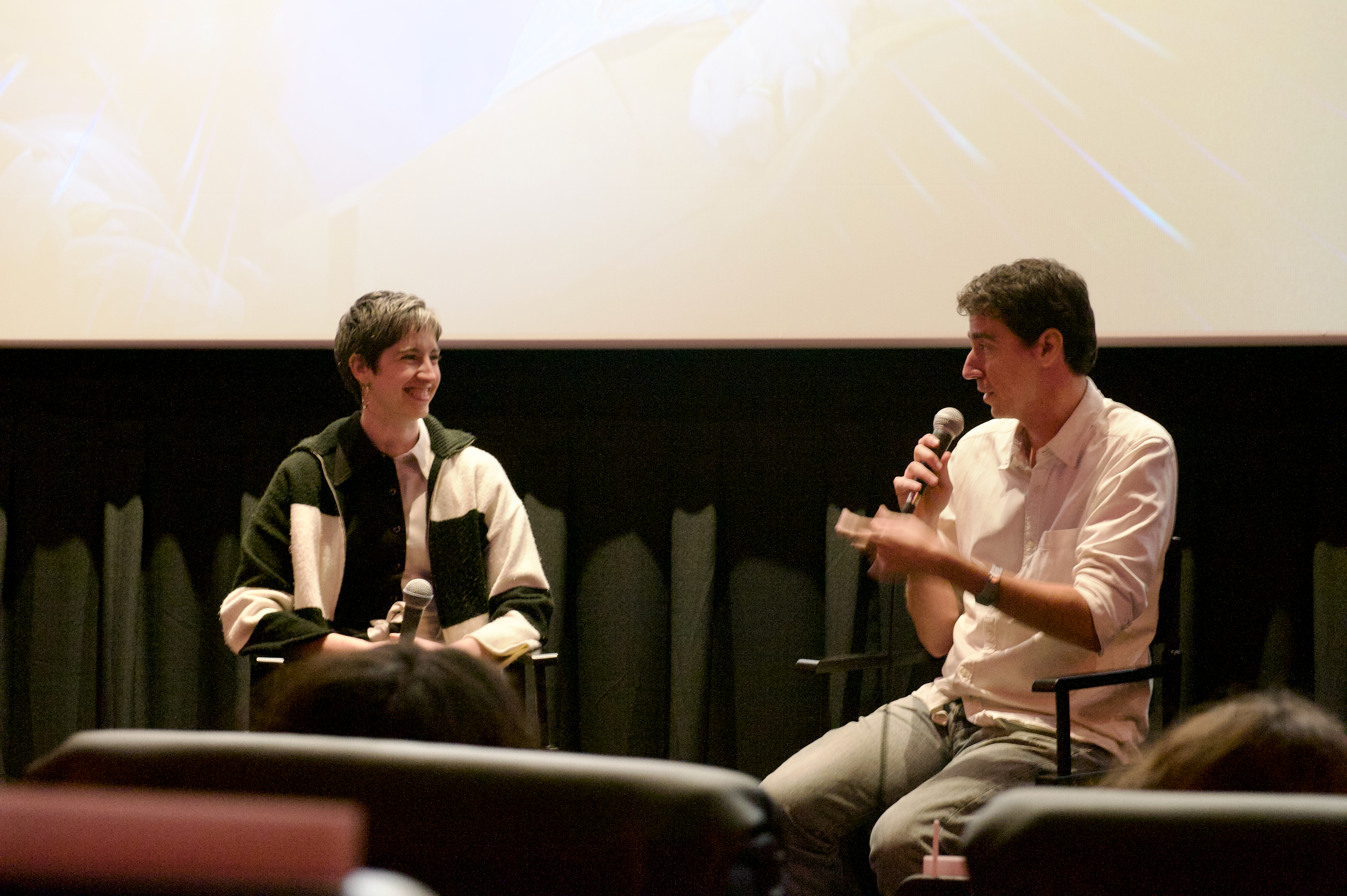
Britto (right) speaking with Emily Ann Hoffman (left) at a screening of the film

The film had its world premiere at South by Southwest on March 13, 2024. In July 2024, Magnolia Pictures acquired distribution rights to the film, setting it for a September 20, 2024, theatrical release.

== Reception ==
On the review aggregator website Rotten Tomatoes, 83% of 35 critics' reviews are positive, with an average rating of 6.7/10. The website's consensus reads: "A metaphysical headtrip grounded by Mary-Louise Parker and Ayo Adebiri's terrific chemistry, Omni Loop may not solve the meaning of life but it does deliver a brainy good time." Metacritic, which uses a weighted average, assigned the film a score of 68 out of 100, based on ten critics, indicating "generally favorable" reviews.

In a review on RogerEbert.com, Matt Zoller Seitz gave the movie three out of four stars, saying, "it’s a seductive and thought provoking ride with sensitive and surprising performances."

== See also ==
- List of films featuring time loops
