= Past Lives (film) =

2023 film by Celine Song

- Theatrical release poster
- Directed by: Celine Song
- Written by: Celine Song
- Produced by: David Hinojosa; Christine Vachon; Pamela Koffler
- Starring: Greta Lee; Teo Yoo; John Magaro
- Cinematography: Shabier Kirchner
- Edited by: Keith Fraase
- Music by: Christopher Bear; Daniel Rossen
- Production companies: CJ ENM; Killer Films; 2AM
- Distributed by: A24 (United States); CJ ENM (South Korea)
- Release dates: January 21, 2023 (Sundance); June 2, 2023 (United States); February 26, 2024 (South Korea)
- Running time: 106 minutes
- Countries: South Korea; United States
- Languages: English; Korean
- Budget: $12 million
- Box office: $42.7 million

Past Lives is a 2023 romantic drama film written and directed by Celine Song in her feature directorial debut. Starring Greta Lee, Teo Yoo, and John Magaro, it follows two childhood friends over the course of 24 years while they contemplate the nature of their relationship as they grow apart, living different lives. The plot is semi-autobiographical and inspired by real events from Song's life.

Past Lives premiered at the Sundance Film Festival on January 21, 2023, and was released by A24 in the United States on June 2 and by CJ ENM in South Korea on a limited release on February 26, 2024, and a wide release on March 6. The film received critical acclaim and grossed $42.7 million worldwide.

It was named one of the top ten films of 2023 by the National Board of Review and the American Film Institute, receiving multiple accolades, with five nominations at the 81st Golden Globe Awards including for Best Motion Picture - Drama and nominations at the 96th Academy Awards for Best Picture and Best Original Screenplay. Since its release, it has been included in lists of the best films of the 2020s and the 21st century.

== Plot ==
In Seoul, South Korea, in 1999, Na Young and Hae Sung are 12-year-old classmates who develop feelings for each other and go on a playdate set up by their parents. Shortly thereafter, Na Young's family immigrates to Canada and the two lose contact. Na Young changes her name to Nora.

In 2011, Hae Sung has finished his military service and Nora has moved to New York City. While calling her mother, Nora discovers on Facebook that Hae Sung had posted that he was looking for Na Young, unaware of her name change. They reconnect through video calls but are unable to visit each other, as Nora is about to attend a writer's retreat in Montauk and Hae Sung is moving to China for a Mandarin language exchange. Eventually, Nora tells Hae Sung they should stop talking for a while, as she wants to focus on her writing and life in New York.

At her retreat, Nora meets Arthur Zaturansky and they fall in love, at one point discussing the Buddhist-derived concept of inyeon (인연, dependent origination), how a relationship between two souls in the present life is influenced by interactions in thousands of past lives. Hae Sung also meets a woman, whom he begins to date.

In 2023, Arthur and Nora are married and living in New York. Hae Sung, no longer with his girlfriend, travels to visit Nora. Arthur wonders if he is a roadblock in their love story, suggesting to Nora that, if another man with similar appeal had met her at the same time, Nora would have married him to secure a green card for U.S. residency. He also expresses anxiety about cultural barriers in their relationship, highlighting Nora's habit of sleep-talking in Korean: "you dream in a language that I can't understand." Nora reassures Arthur that she loves him.

The next night, the three go out to a speakeasy. Initially, Nora translates between the two men, but eventually speaks with Hae Sung exclusively in Korean. He wonders what they were to each other in their past lives, and what would have happened if she had never left Korea and they had continued their relationship. When Nora goes to the bathroom, Hae Sung apologizes to Arthur for speaking alone with Nora, but Arthur says he is glad to have met him.

They return to Arthur and Nora's apartment. Hae Sung invites them to visit him in Korea and calls an Uber. Nora waits with him, and the two exchange long looks at each other until the car arrives. Hae Sung says that perhaps they are, at that moment, experiencing a past life, and asks Nora what their relationship will be in their next life. She says she does not know. Hae Sung says, "I'll see you then." He leaves in the car and she walks back to her apartment, crying into Arthur's arms.

== Cast ==
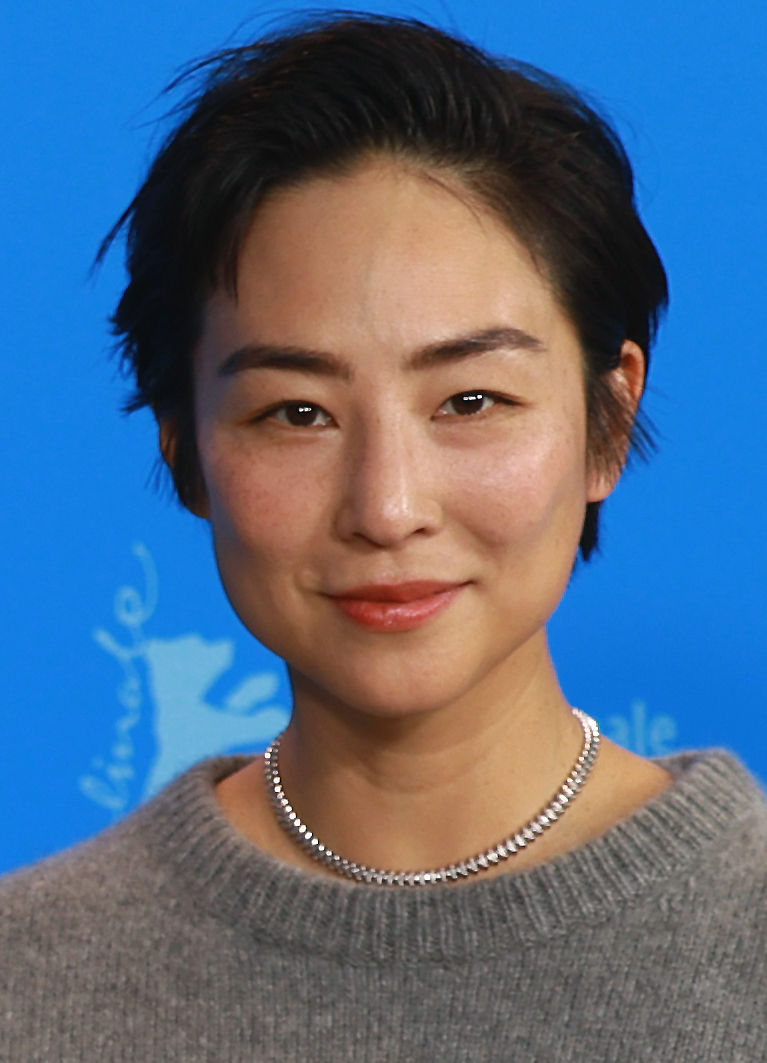
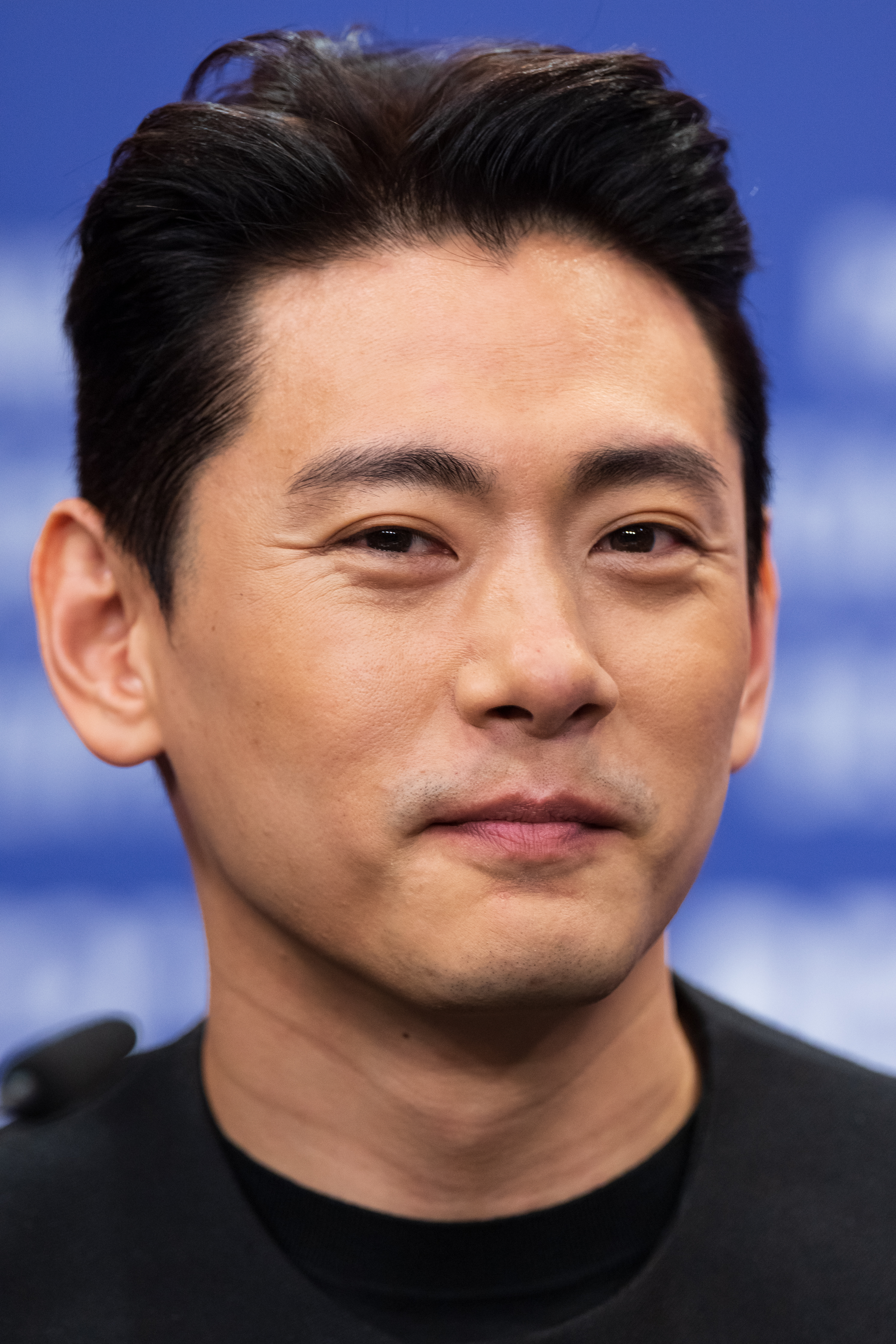
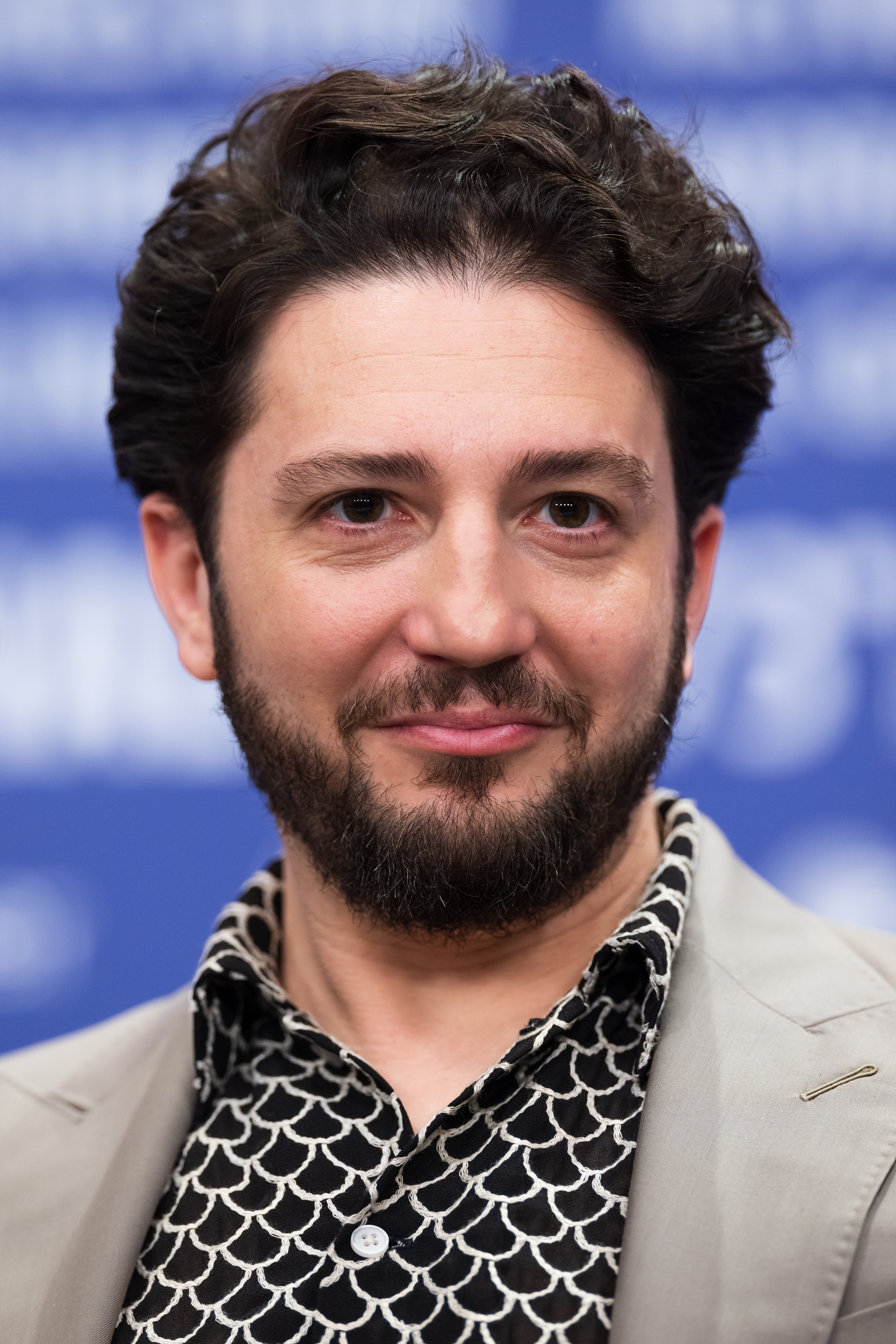
The film stars Greta Lee, Teo Yoo and John Magaro.
- Greta Lee as Nora Moon/Moon Na Young
  - Seung Ah Moon as young Nora
- Teo Yoo as Jung Hae Sung
  - Seung Min Yim as young Jung Hae Sung
- John Magaro as Arthur Zaturansky
- Ji-Hye Yoon as Nora's mother
- Choi Won-young as Nora's father
- Min Young Ahn as Hae Sung's mother
- Jojo T. Gibbs as Janice
- Emily Cass McDonnell as Rachel
- Federico Rodriguez as Robert
- Conrad Schott as Peter
- Kristen Sieh as Heather

== Production ==
In January 2020, it was announced Choi Woo-shik would star in the film, with Celine Song set to direct from a screenplay she wrote, and A24 set to produce and distribute alongside Killer Films and CJ ENM.

=== Casting ===
Greta Lee auditioned for the role of Nora Moon after receiving an email with the subject line "Korean: Do you speak it?" but she was rejected originally for being too old. Lee described not getting the role as like a "bad breakup". Song was "stuck on thinking" that Nora "had to be someone in their late 20s". Around a year later, Song contacted Lee after the casting department changed direction and began looking for an older actor for the role, something that opened Song's options for casting the lead. She sent her an email asking "Are you free right now?" with a Zoom link. Without time to prepare, Lee took the meeting with Song where she read scenes and was offered the role the same day. Lee was announced as part of the cast in August 2021 alongside Teo Yoo and John Magaro who joined the cast of the film, with Yoo replacing Choi.

=== Filming ===
Song expressed her desire to cinematographer Shabier Kirchner to shoot Past Lives on 35 mm film in order to create a film about the passage of time that felt timeless. Producers were initially hesitant for Song as a first-time filmmaker to shoot on film. Due to shooting on film, Song emphasized to actors what she wanted with rehearsals in order to shoot in as few takes as possible. Kirchner shot Past Lives on 3-perf 35 mm film, opting for Kodak Vision3 500T 5219 film stock due to its versatility across lighting conditions in both interior and exterior scenes. He used the Panavision Millennium XL2 camera paired with Panavision PVintage and Ultra Speed anamorphic lenses. Kirchner cited the films Like Father, Like Son (2013) and Yi Yi (2000) as inspirational references for the cinematography style of Past Lives due to how they treated love and the economy respectively. Principal photography took place during July and August 2021 at locations around New York, including the city's ferries, and under and along the Manhattan Bridge. The opening scene was shot at the Holiday Cocktail Lounge at 75 Saint Mark's Place in the East Village. The bookstore scene where Nora meets her husband Arthur at a book signing was filmed at McNally Jackson Books in Williamsburg, Brooklyn. Nora and Hae Sung's reunion was filmed in Madison Square Park in front of the Statue of David Farragut. The apartment sets for Hae Sung's and Nora's Skype conversations were built next to each other at Greenpoint Studios in Brooklyn where they filmed simultaneously. The carousel scene was filmed at Jane's Carousel in Brooklyn Bridge Park, Brooklyn. The production then moved to Seoul and filmed from late October to early November.

=== Post-production ===
The 35 mm film negatives were developed and processed at the Kodak Film Lab New York with 4K digital scans done by Technicolor Postworks. Past Lives was edited by Keith Fraase who joined the production in late 2021. Fraase initially worked from his home in Westchester editing dailies with Song joining each session. Post-production moved to Company 3 in New York once shooting had wrapped.

== Release and reception ==
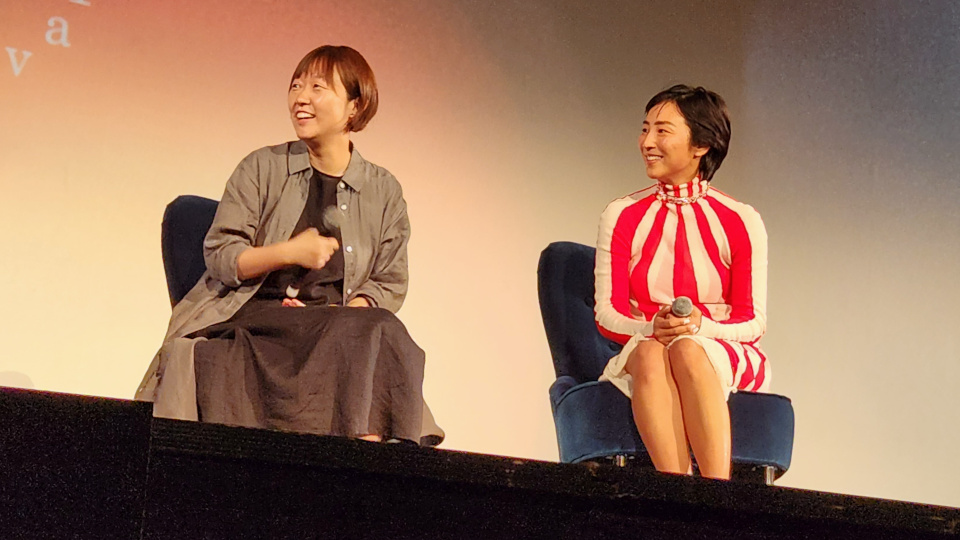
Director Celine Song with lead actress Greta Lee at a screening of the film

The film had its world premiere at the Sundance Film Festival on January 21, 2023. It also screened at the 73rd Berlin International Film Festival on February 19, 2023. Later that month, StudioCanal and CJ ENM were among the distributors acquiring the international distribution rights. It was the opening film for the 2023 Seattle International Film Festival. Past Lives had a limited theatrical release in the United States on June 2, 2023, before expanding to more theaters on June 9; it was released nationwide on June 23.

It was screened at the 28th Busan International Film Festival as part of "Korean American Special Exhibition: Korean Diaspora" on 5 October 2023.

=== Box office ===
Past Lives grossed $11.3 million in the United States and Canada, and $31.4 million in other territories, for a worldwide total of $42.7 million.

The film grossed $232,266 from four theaters in its opening weekend, an average of $55,066 per venue. By its sixth weekend, the film had a running total of $8.4 million.

=== Critical response ===
On the review aggregator website Rotten Tomatoes, 95% of 319 critics' reviews are positive. The website's consensus reads: "A remarkable debut for writer-director Celine Song, Past Lives uses the bonds between its sensitively sketched central characters to support trenchant observations on the human condition." Metacritic, which uses a weighted average, assigned the film a score of 94 out of 100, based on 52 critics, indicating "universal acclaim".

Manola Darghis, in The New York Times, compared the film to French romantic cinema, complimenting its restraint in the presentation of its main themes, and writing: "The movie's modesty—its intimacy, human scale, humble locations and lack of visual oomph—is one of its strengths. The characters live in homes that are pleasant yet ordinary, the kind that you can imagine hanging out in, the kind you want to hang out in. There are few big, look-at-me details, though you might notice a poster for Jacques Rivette’s 1974 classic Céline and Julie Go Boating in Nora’s father’s home office in Seoul." In The Guardian, Peter Bradshaw praised the film highly, referencing existing comparisons to the works of Richard Linklater, Noah Baumbach, and Greta Gerwig, and himself likening the film to Wong Kar-wai's "In the Mood for Love". He wrote: "Past Lives is a glorious date movie, and a movie for every occasion, too. As ever with films like this, there is an auxiliary pleasure in wondering how much of her own past life Song has used. It's a must-see."

Filmmaker Daniel Scheinert, who co-directed A24's Everything Everywhere All at Once with Daniel Kwan, praised the film, saying: "It's remarkable, the way [Celine Song] pushed past the story of 'picking mister right' and the story of 'fighting to win the girl' and somehow brought her audience to this painfully relatable heartbreak on the other side of those stories. I'm inspired by it. And mystified by how the filmmaking team did it. But when I was lucky enough to see a Q&A and have some brunch with Celine, I saw how curious and thoughtful and passionate and charmingly bossy she was, and I was instantly convinced that this movie was no accident. It's a smart, confident, unique poem because Celine is a smart, confident, unique poet." Filmmaker Christopher Nolan also praised the film and named it one of his favorites, calling it "subtle in a beautiful sort of way". Other filmmakers, such as Allison Anders, Reinaldo Marcus Green, Andrew Haigh, Rich Peppiatt, and Zoe Lister-Jones cited it as among their favorite films of 2023.

==== Retrospective lists ====
Collider ranked it 7th on its list of the "20 Best Drama Movies of the 2020s So Far", calling it "a story that could only exist because of modern circumstances, but feels timeless in its approach. How does someone choose between two lovers, one that represents the most fruitful days of her youth, and the other someone she has grown to love as part of her reality? Celine Song examines these critical conversations through the perspective of an immigrant story." In 2024, IndieWire included it on its list of the "Best American Independent Movies of the 21st Century" and in 2025 ranked it 40th on its list of "The 100 Best Movies of the 2020s (So Far)." Looper also named it the "Best PG-13 Movie of All Time," calling it "a master class in the art of subtlety while evoking complex human emotions. The minimalist love story is like no other in how it expertly captures the slow-burn nature of fate. It's a bittersweet experience that'll leave you aching for all of life's 'what-ifs.'" In May 2025, ScreenCrush ranked the film 10th on its list of "The 20 Best Movies of the Last 20 Years", with Matt Singer writing, "The resolution of this low-key love triangle is absolutely devastating, and will have you reflecting on the moments and choices that shaped your own life, even if their importance only became clear in hindsight." In June 2025, The New York Times ranked the film 86th on its list of "The 100 Best Movies of the 21st Century", writing that the film "is filled with exquisite reflections on time, love, fate and reinvention." It also ranked number 47 on the "Readers' Choice" edition of the list. In July 2025, it ranked number 55 on Rolling Stone's list of "The 100 Best Movies of the 21st Century."

=== Accolades ===
Award	Date of ceremony	Category	Nominee(s)	Result	Ref.
Academy Awards	March 10, 2024	Best Picture	David Hinojosa, Christine Vachon and Pamela Koffler	Nominated	
Academy Awards	March 10, 2024	Best Original Screenplay	Celine Song	Nominated	
African-American Film Critics Association	January 15, 2024	Top 10 Films of the Year	Past Lives	5th Place	
Alliance of Women Film Journalists	January 3, 2024	Best Film	Past Lives	Nominated	
Alliance of Women Film Journalists	January 3, 2024	Best Non-English-Language Film	Past Lives	Nominated	
Alliance of Women Film Journalists	January 3, 2024	Best Director	Celine Song	Nominated	
Alliance of Women Film Journalists	January 3, 2024	Best Actress	Greta Lee	Nominated	
Alliance of Women Film Journalists	January 3, 2024	Best Woman's Breakthrough Performance	Greta Lee	Nominated	
Alliance of Women Film Journalists	January 3, 2024	Best Screenplay, Original	Celine Song	Nominated	
Alliance of Women Film Journalists	January 3, 2024	Best Woman Director	Celine Song	Nominated	
Alliance of Women Film Journalists	January 3, 2024	Best Woman Screenwriter	Celine Song	Won	
American Cinema Editors	March 3, 2024	Best Edited Feature Film (Drama, Theatrical)	Keith Fraase	Nominated	
American Film Institute Awards	December 7, 2023	Top 10 Films of the Year	Past Lives	Won (Note: This award does not have a single winner, but recognizes multiple films.)	
Asia Pacific Screen Awards	November 3, 2023	Best Director	Celine Song	Won	
Artios Awards	March 7, 2024	Outstanding Achievement in Casting – Feature Studio or Independent (Drama)	Ellen Chenoweth, Susanne Scheel	Won	
Astra Film and Creative Arts Awards	January 6, 2024	Best Picture	Past Lives	Nominated	
Astra Film and Creative Arts Awards	January 6, 2024	Best Director	Celine Song	Nominated	
Astra Film and Creative Arts Awards	January 6, 2024	Best Actress	Greta Lee	Nominated	
Astra Film and Creative Arts Awards	January 6, 2024	Best Original Screenplay	Celine Song	Nominated	
Astra Film and Creative Arts Awards	January 6, 2024	Best First Feature	Celine Song	Won	
Austin Film Critics Association Awards	January 10, 2024	Best Film	Past Lives	Nominated	
Austin Film Critics Association Awards	January 10, 2024	Best Director	Celine Song	Nominated	
Austin Film Critics Association Awards	January 10, 2024	Best Actress	Greta Lee	Nominated	
Austin Film Critics Association Awards	January 10, 2024	Best Original Screenplay	Celine Song	Won	
Austin Film Critics Association Awards	January 10, 2024	Best First Film	Celine Song	Won	
Austin Film Critics Association Awards	January 10, 2024	The Robert R. "Bobby" McCurdy Memorial Breakthrough Artist Award	Celine Song	Nominated	
Berlin International Film Festival	February 25, 2023	Golden Bear	Celine Song	Nominated	
Black Film Critics Circle	December 20, 2023	Top Ten Films	Past Lives	6th Place	
Black Film Critics Circle	December 20, 2023	Best Original Screenplay	Celine Song	Won	
Boston Society of Film Critics Awards	December 10, 2023	Best New Filmmaker	Celine Song	Won	
British Academy Film Awards	February 18, 2024	Best Actor	Teo Yoo	Nominated	
British Academy Film Awards	February 18, 2024	Best Original Screenplay	Celine Song	Nominated	
British Academy Film Awards	February 18, 2024	Best Film Not in the English Language	Celine Song, David Hinojosa, Pamela Koffler and Christine Vachon	Nominated	
British Independent Film Awards	December 3, 2023	Best International Independent Film	Celine Song, David Hinojosa, Christine Vachon, and Pamela Koffler	Nominated	
Celebration of Cinema & Television	December 4, 2023	Actress Award (Film)	Greta Lee	Won	
Chicago Film Critics Association Awards	December 12, 2023	Best Actor	Teo Yoo	Nominated	
Chicago Film Critics Association Awards	December 12, 2023	Most Promising Performer	Teo Yoo	Nominated	
Chicago Film Critics Association Awards	December 12, 2023	Best Original Screenplay	Celine Song	Nominated	
Chicago Film Critics Association Awards	December 12, 2023	Milos Stehlik Award for Breakthrough Filmmaker	Celine Song	Won	
Cinema Eye Honors	January 12, 2024	Heterodox Award	Past Lives	Nominated	
Cinema for Peace Awards	February 18–19, 2024	Cinema for Peace Dove for The Most Valuable Film of the Year 2024	Past Lives	Nominated	
Critics' Choice Movie Awards	January 14, 2024	Best Picture	Past Lives	Nominated	
Critics' Choice Movie Awards	January 14, 2024	Best Actress	Greta Lee	Nominated	
Critics' Choice Movie Awards	January 14, 2024	Best Original Screenplay	Celine Song	Nominated	
Dallas–Fort Worth Film Critics Association	December 18, 2023	Top 10 Films of the Year	Past Lives	6th Place	
Dallas–Fort Worth Film Critics Association	December 18, 2023	Best Director	Celine Song	5th Place	
Dallas–Fort Worth Film Critics Association	December 18, 2023	Best Actress	Greta Lee	4th Place	
Deauville American Film Festival	September 9, 2023	Grand Special Prize	Past Lives	Nominated	
Denver Film Critics Society	January 12, 2024	Best Film	Past Lives	Nominated	
Denver Film Critics Society	January 12, 2024	Best Lead Performance by an Actor, Female	Greta Lee	Nominated	
Denver Film Critics Society	January 12, 2024	Best Original Screenplay	Celine Song	Nominated	
Denver Film Critics Society	January 12, 2024	Best Non-English Language Feature	Past Lives	Nominated	
Directors Guild of America Awards	February 10, 2024	Outstanding Directing – First-Time Feature Film	Celine Song	Won	
Dublin Film Critics Circle Awards	December 19, 2023	Best Film	Past Lives	Won	
Dublin Film Critics Circle Awards	December 19, 2023	Best Director	Celine Song	Won	
Film Fest Ghent	October 21, 2023	Best Film	Past Lives	Nominated	
Film Fest Ghent	October 21, 2023	Special Mention	Greta Lee, Yoo Teo and John Magaro	Won	
Florida Film Critics Circle Awards	December 21, 2023	Best Picture	Past Lives	Nominated	
Florida Film Critics Circle Awards	December 21, 2023	Best Director	Celine Song	Nominated	
Florida Film Critics Circle Awards	December 21, 2023	Best Original Screenplay	Celine Song	Won	
Florida Film Critics Circle Awards	December 21, 2023	Best First Film	Celine Song	Won	
Florida Film Critics Circle Awards	December 21, 2023	Breakout Award	Celine Song	Runner-up	
Georgia Film Critics Association Awards	January 5, 2024	Best Picture	Past Lives	Runner-up	
Georgia Film Critics Association Awards	January 5, 2024	Best Director	Celine Song	Nominated	
Georgia Film Critics Association Awards	January 5, 2024	Best Actress	Greta Lee	Nominated	
Georgia Film Critics Association Awards	January 5, 2024	Best Original Screenplay	Celine Song	Runner-up	
Georgia Film Critics Association Awards	January 5, 2024	Best Original Song	Sharon Van Etten and Zach Dawes ("Quiet Eyes")	Nominated	
Golden Globe Awards	January 7, 2024	Best Motion Picture – Drama	Past Lives	Nominated	
Golden Globe Awards	January 7, 2024	Best Picture – Non-English Language	Past Lives	Nominated	
Golden Globe Awards	January 7, 2024	Best Director	Celine Song	Nominated	
Golden Globe Awards	January 7, 2024	Best Screenplay	Celine Song	Nominated	
Golden Globe Awards	January 7, 2024	Best Actress in a Motion Picture – Drama	Greta Lee	Nominated	
Golden Trailer Awards	June 29, 2023	Best Romance	"Fate" (Mark Wollen & Associates)	Won	
Gotham Independent Film Awards	November 27, 2023	Best Feature	Past Lives	Won	
Gotham Independent Film Awards	November 27, 2023	Breakthrough Director	Celine Song	Nominated	
Gotham Independent Film Awards	November 27, 2023	Outstanding Lead Performance	Greta Lee	Nominated	
Hollywood Critics Association Midseason Film Awards	June 30, 2023	Best Picture	Past Lives	Runner-up	
Hollywood Critics Association Midseason Film Awards	June 30, 2023	Best Indie	Past Lives	Won	
Hollywood Critics Association Midseason Film Awards	June 30, 2023	Best Director	Celine Song	Runner-up	
Hollywood Critics Association Midseason Film Awards	June 30, 2023	Best Actor	Teo Yoo	Runner-up	
Hollywood Critics Association Midseason Film Awards	June 30, 2023	Best Actress	Greta Lee	Won	
Hollywood Critics Association Midseason Film Awards	June 30, 2023	Best Supporting Actor	John Magaro	Nominated	
Hollywood Critics Association Midseason Film Awards	June 30, 2023	Best Screenplay	Celine Song	Won	
Hollywood Music in Media Awards	November 15, 2023	Best Original Song — Independent Film	Sharon Van Etten and Zach Dawes ("Quiet Eyes")	Nominated	
Houston Film Critics Society	January 22, 2024	Best Picture	Past Lives	Nominated	
Houston Film Critics Society	January 22, 2024	Best Actress	Greta Lee	Nominated	
Houston Film Critics Society	January 22, 2024	Best Screenplay	Celine Song	Nominated	
Independent Spirit Awards	February 25, 2024	Best Film	David Hinojosa, Pamela Koffler, Christine Vachon	Won	
Independent Spirit Awards	February 25, 2024	Best Director	Celine Song	Won	
Independent Spirit Awards	February 25, 2024	Best Lead Performance	Greta Lee	Nominated	
Independent Spirit Awards	February 25, 2024	Best Lead Performance	Teo Yoo	Nominated	
Independent Spirit Awards	February 25, 2024	Best Screenplay	Celine Song	Nominated	
Indiana Film Journalists Association	December 17, 2023	Best Film	Past Lives	Nominated	
Indiana Film Journalists Association	December 17, 2023	Best Director	Celine Song	Nominated	
Indiana Film Journalists Association	December 17, 2023	Best Lead Performance	Greta Lee	Nominated	
Indiana Film Journalists Association	December 17, 2023	Best Original Screenplay	Celine Song	Nominated	
Indiana Film Journalists Association	December 17, 2023	Breakout of the Year	Celine Song	Won	
Indiana Film Journalists Association	December 17, 2023	Best Foreign Language Film	Past Lives	Nominated	
IndieWire Critics Poll	December 11, 2023	Best Film	Past Lives	4th Place	
IndieWire Critics Poll	December 11, 2023	Best Director	Celine Song	7th Place	
IndieWire Critics Poll	December 11, 2023	Best Performance	Greta Lee	9th Place (Note: Tied with Jeffrey Wright for American Fiction.)	
IndieWire Critics Poll	December 11, 2023	Best Screenplay	Celine Song	2nd Place	
IndieWire Critics Poll	December 11, 2023	Best First Feature	Past Lives	Won	
Jerusalem Film Festival	July 23, 2023	Best International Debut	Past Lives	Nominated	
Las Vegas Film Critics Society	December 13, 2023	Best Director	Celine Song	Nominated	
Las Vegas Film Critics Society	December 13, 2023	Best Actress	Greta Lee	Nominated	
Las Vegas Film Critics Society	December 13, 2023	Best Original Screenplay	Celine Song	Nominated	
Las Vegas Film Critics Society	December 13, 2023	Breakout Filmmaker	Celine Song	Won	
Los Angeles Film Critics Association	December 10, 2023	New Generation Award	Celine Song	Won	
Manaki Brothers Film Festival	September 29, 2023	Golden Camera 300	Shabier Kirchner	Nominated	
Middleburg Film Festival	October 22, 2023	MFF Breakthrough Filmmaker Award	Celine Song	Won	
Minnesota Film Critics Alliance	February 4, 2024	Best Picture	Past Lives	Nominated	
Minnesota Film Critics Alliance	February 4, 2024	Best Director	Celine Song	Nominated	
Minnesota Film Critics Alliance	February 4, 2024	Best Screenplay	Celine Song	Won	
Minnesota Film Critics Alliance	February 4, 2024	Best Actress	Greta Lee	Runner-up (Note: Shared with Emma Stone for Poor Things.)	
Miskolc International Film Festival	September 9, 2023	Emeric Pressburger Prize for Best Feature Film	Past Lives	Nominated	
National Board of Review	December 6, 2023	Top Ten Films	Past Lives	Won	
National Board of Review	December 6, 2023	Best Directorial Debut	Celine Song	Won	
National Society of Film Critics Awards	January 6, 2024	Best Film	Past Lives	Won	
National Society of Film Critics Awards	January 6, 2024	Best Screenplay	Celine Song	Runner-up (Note: Tied with David Hemingson for The Holdovers.)	
New York Film Critics Online Awards	December 15, 2023	Top 10 Films	Past Lives	Won	
New York Film Critics Online Awards	December 15, 2023	Best Debut Director	Celine Song	Won	
New York Film Critics Circle Awards	November 30, 2023	Best First Film	Past Lives	Won	
North Texas Film Critics Association	December 18, 2023	Best Actress	Greta Lee	Nominated	
North Texas Film Critics Association	December 18, 2023	Best Screenplay	Celine Song	Nominated	
Phoenix Film Critics Society	December 18, 2023	Top Ten Films of 2023	Past Lives	Won	
Oklahoma Film Critics Circle	January 3, 2024	Top 10 Films	Past Lives	5th Place	
Oklahoma Film Critics Circle	January 3, 2024	Best First Feature	Celine Song	Won	
Producers Guild of America Awards	February 25, 2024	Darryl F. Zanuck Award for Outstanding Producer of Theatrical Motion Pictures	Past Lives	Nominated	
San Diego Film Critics Society	December 19, 2023	Best Original Screenplay	Celine Song	Nominated	
San Diego Film Critics Society	December 19, 2023	Best First Feature	Celine Song	Runner-up	
San Francisco Bay Area Film Critics Circle Awards	January 9, 2024	Best Film	Past Lives	Nominated	
San Francisco Bay Area Film Critics Circle Awards	January 9, 2024	Best Director	Celine Song	Nominated	
San Francisco Bay Area Film Critics Circle Awards	January 9, 2024	Best Actress	Greta Lee	Nominated	
San Francisco Bay Area Film Critics Circle Awards	January 9, 2024	Best Original Screenplay	Celine Song	Won	
Satellite Awards	February 18, 2024	Best Motion Picture, Drama	Past Lives	Nominated	
Satellite Awards	February 18, 2024	Best Actress in a Motion Picture, Drama	Greta Lee	Nominated	
Satellite Awards	February 18, 2024	Best Screenplay, Original	Celine Song	Nominated	
Santa Barbara International Film Festival	February 10, 2024	Virtuoso Award	Greta Lee	Won	
Seattle Film Critics Society Awards	January 8, 2024	Best Picture of the Year	Past Lives	Won	
Seattle Film Critics Society Awards	January 8, 2024	Best Director	Celine Song	Nominated	
Seattle Film Critics Society Awards	January 8, 2024	Best Actress in a Leading Role	Greta Lee	Nominated	
Seattle Film Critics Society Awards	January 8, 2024	Best Screenplay	Celine Song	Nominated	
Seattle Film Critics Society Awards	January 8, 2024	Best Film Editing	Keith Frasse	Nominated	
Southeastern Film Critics Association	December 18, 2023	Top 10 Films	Past Lives	6th Place	
St. Louis Film Critics Association	December 17, 2023	Best Film	Past Lives	Nominated	
St. Louis Film Critics Association	December 17, 2023	Best Director	Celine Song	Nominated	
St. Louis Film Critics Association	December 17, 2023	Best Actress	Greta Lee	Nominated	
St. Louis Film Critics Association	December 17, 2023	Best Original Screenplay	Celine Song	Nominated	
Sydney Film Festival	June 18, 2023	Best Film	Past Lives	Nominated	
Toronto Film Critics Association	December 17, 2023	Best Original Screenplay	Celine Song	Runner-up (Note: Shared with Justine Triet and Arthur Harari for Anatomy of a Fall.)	
Toronto Film Critics Association	December 17, 2023	Best First Feature	Past Lives	Runner-up (Note: Shared with American Fiction.)	
Washington D.C. Area Film Critics Association Awards	December 10, 2023	Best Film	Past Lives	Nominated	
Washington D.C. Area Film Critics Association Awards	December 10, 2023	Best Director	Celine Song	Nominated	
Washington D.C. Area Film Critics Association Awards	December 10, 2023	Best Actress	Greta Lee	Nominated	
Washington D.C. Area Film Critics Association Awards	December 10, 2023	Best Original Screenplay	Celine Song	Won	
Women Film Critics Circle Awards	December 18, 2023	Best Movie by a Woman	Past Lives	Won	
Women Film Critics Circle Awards	December 18, 2023	Best Woman Storyteller	Celine Song	Won	
Women Film Critics Circle Awards	December 18, 2023	Best Screen Couple	Greta Lee and John Magaro	Runner-up	
Writers Guild of America Awards	April 14, 2024	Best Original Screenplay	Celine Song	Nominated	
