= IPR.VC =

Media and entertainment fund management company

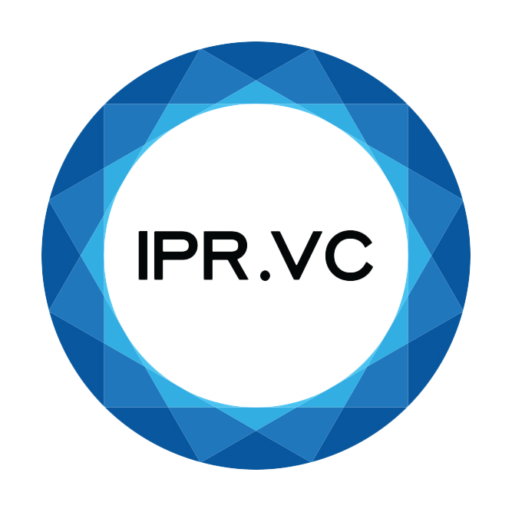
IPR.VC logo

IPR.VC is an investment funds management company specializing in content production in media and entertainment. The parent company IPR.VC Management Oy was founded in 2014 and the first fund was launched in 2015. Currently IPR.VC manages three funds, the most recent having commenced in 2023. The invested assets under management amount currently to EUR 189 million, with capital from pension funds, family offices and non-profit sector investors. IPR.VC is currently one of Europe’s largest content-focused private investment funds.

In 2025 The European Investment Fund (EIF), part of the European Investment Bank (EIB) Group, invested EUR 25 million to IPR.VC Fund III which currently exceeds EUR 100 million for the production of film and TV.

IPR.VC has partnered with international production, sales and distribution companies, such as A24 and XYZ Films. Among productions they have financed are Bordertown (2016-2020), Causeway (2022), Run Rabbit Run (2023), Beau Is Afraid (2023), BlackBerry (2023), Civil War (2024), Materialists (2025), Eddington (2025), Mile End Kicks (2025), Marty Supreme (2025), Mother Mary (2026) and Gentle Monster (2026).

IPR.VC is established in Finland and is regulated along EU investment management legislation by the Finnish Financial Supervisory Authority. It has offices in Helsinki and London.
