= Jack Woodbridge =

American pianist, singer and composer

- Born: 1956; Scranton, Pennsylvania, USA
- Died: 2023 (aged 66–67)
- Education: Penn State University
- Website: www.jackwoodbridge.com

Jack Woodbridge (1956 - 2023) was an American-born pianist, singer and composer from Scranton, Pennsylvania. Woodbridge was known for his collaborations with independent film director Flavio Alves and award-winning guitarist/producer Dean Bailin as well as for his theatrical scores and two albums, Picture This and Jack of Hearts.

== Early life ==
Woodbridge was born and raised in the West Side neighborhood of Scranton, Pennsylvania. He was the son of John and Joan Kenney Woodbridge and was a 1974 graduate of West Scranton High School. He discovered his love for music at an early age and began playing the piano at age eight. He wrote his first song, "Debbie Dear," at age 12 and began singing professionally following his graduation from high school.

Woodbridge graduated with a B.A. in advertising from Pennsylvania State University in 1978. He self-designed his curriculum to include an emphasis on Music, Graphic Arts, Film and Photography. He had been a member of ASCAP (American Society of Composers, Authors and Publishers) since 1996.

== Career ==
Woodbridge worked for many years as a keyboardist and vocalist for several bands in Northeastern Pennsylvania; including OFAY (1974), The Stones Show and W.A.M.M. As a solo pianist, he focused on the Great American Songbook, contemporary standards and his own original compositions.

He performed at various clubs, restaurants and private events throughout the world. As the event pianist for Merrill Lynch, he performed at the Plaza, Waldorf and Ritz hotels in New York City. He continued to perform live throughout Manhattan and Northeast Pennsylvania until his death.

=== Composer ===
With the encouragement and support of Tony Martell of CBS Records, he began to compose as a freelance writer for the label's publishing division, CBSongs. As a composer, Woodbridge scored the music to several films; including Even in My Dreams, The Secret Friend and Tom in America, all directed by Flavio Alves. He also scored the off-Broadway show The Tale of Tyler T and a musical revue concept called Vampire Blues, as well as a rock opera, The Great Northeast, that was recorded and aired on public radio in 1991. The Great Northeast was recorded and produced by George Graham. Woodbridge worked on a soundtrack to a theatrical production based on the life of Vincent van Gogh that was scheduled for a production in early 2014. Woodbridge's original music has been featured on the CNN television network, where he wrote the main themes for various productions, including Showbiz Today. His music has also been featured as a part of the New York City Marathon and the New York Dance Alliance. His music was recorded by Babs Winn and the Kicking Boogie Band, Sharon McNight and Laurie Naughton and he has co-written with two-time Academy Award-winning composer Al Kasha and award-winning lyricist Valerie Ciptak. Woodbridge also composed jingles and other promotional music for the Maloney and Fox Agency in New York City; including for General Motors and Microsoft.

=== Albums and live performances ===
Having always loved live performance, Woodbridge returned to the stage in the early 2000s and his shows began to quickly sell out, most notably at Sam's Cabaret in New York City. This led to his first album, Picture This (2006), a collection of jazz, pop and blues produced and arranged by Dean Bailin.

Woodbridge's second album, Jack of Hearts (2010), was considered his most personal work. The music included on the album was inspired from his diagnosis and subsequent recovery from a rare spinal tumor that could have left him paralyzed. Once again produced by Bailin, Jack of Hearts led to a sold-out show in Scranton, Pennsylvania, as well as a sold-out encore. The single, "Broken," received much critical acclaim and was turned into a major music video for Joe Van Wie Productions. Completely recovered from his illness, Woodbridge returned to live performing, following a two-year hiatus, in the spring of 2013. His third album, once again produced by Bailin, featuring acclaimed saxophonist "Blue" Lou Marini, was slated for release in 2014.

== Discography ==
=== Albums ===
- Picture This (2006)
- Jack of Hearts (2010)

=== Film Scores ===
- Even in my Dreams (2008)
- The Secret Friend (2010)
- Tom in America (2013)

=== Theater ===
- The Tale of Tyler T (1987)
- Vampire Blues (1991)
- Yellow Heat (1992)
- The Rooms (2013)

=== Other ===
- The Great Northeast (1980)
- CNN Television Network (1990–1995)
- Lincoln Center (A Midsummer Night's Swing, with Babs Winn, 2005)
- Merkin Hall (2006)
- New York Dance Alliance (1994)
- New York City Marathon (annually since 1993)
