= Bernadette Quigley =

American actress

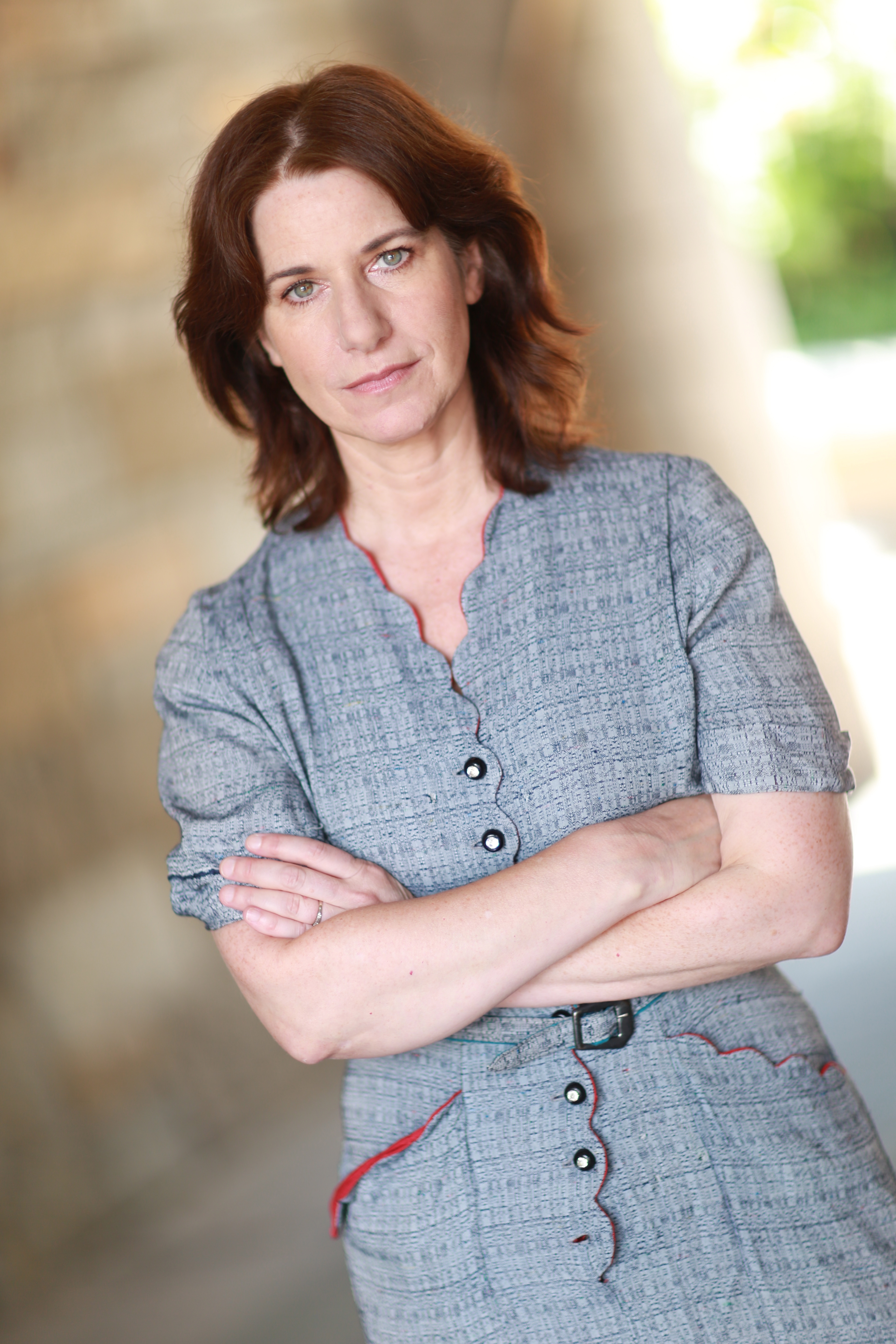
- Quigley in April 2017
- Born: Coldspring, New York, US
- Occupation: Actress
- Spouse: Don Rosler (m. 1991)

Bernadette Quigley is an American television, film, stage and voice-over actress. She is known for her recurring role of the Chaplain in Mr. Robot (Season 2) and numerous guest-star appearances on shows such as The Blacklist, Law & Order, and Chicago Justice.

== Early life ==
Quigley was born in Coldspring, New York and was raised in Peekskill, New York. She is one of eight children. Her mother, Simonne Quigley (née Lanowitz) emigrated to America from France after World War II and her dad, Robert Quigley was Irish-American from the Bronx. Both her parents were strong civil rights activists. After her mother's death at 99 years of age, in an article for Boston.com, Bernadette "recalled being struck by her parents’ convictions and the lessons they taught their children — to stand up against “racism and hypocrisy.”".

== Career ==
In 1996 Quigley made her major motion picture debut opposite Meryl Streep in a small role in Before and After, directed by Barbet Schroeder. Prior to and after 1996, Quigley played many leading roles in the theatre in New York City and throughout the United States, including a national tour in 1992 of Brian Friel’s Dancing at Lughnasa, after understudying the Tony Award-winning play on Broadway. Alvin Klein/New York Times wrote "the individual performances are strikingly good, with Ms. Quigley evincing an uncontainable rapture." Off-Broadway she originated the roles of Jane in Linda Faigao-Hall's Dying in Boulder at La Mama and Aviva in Staci Swedeen's The Goldman Project (Abingdon Theatre). John Simon/New York Magazine singled out her performance in Kenneth Branagh’s Public Enemy at the Irish Arts Center as "outstanding."

Quigley’s range of roles in regional theaters include Lady Bird Johnson in Robert Schenkkan’s All the Way, Agnes in Tracy Letts’ Bug (Repertory Theatre of St. Louis), the title role in Martin McDonagh's The Beauty Queen of Leenane (opposite Eileen Brennan at Virginia Stage), and Elizabeth Proctor in Arthur Miller's The Crucible (Repertory Theatre of St. Louis and Cincinnati Playhouse).

Quigley has also played supporting characters in feature films such as The Garden Left Behind directed by Flavio Alves, Olivia Peace's Tahara, Heidi Philipsen & Jon Russell Cring's Darcy, Stuart Connelly's The Suspect, and Jim Sheridan's Oscar-nominated In America.

Bernadette has recorded a number of audiobooks, including Helen Fielding's Cause Celeb. Publishers Weekly wrote: "Quigley scrupulously brings Fielding's vapid, iconic characters to life with her uncanny ability to switch between accents and mood at the drop of a hat, achieving a subtler style of comedy than listeners may expect."

== Personal life ==
Quigley has been married to songwriter Don Rosler since 1991.

== Filmography ==
=== Film ===
Year	Title	Role	Notes
1996	Before and After	T.J.'s Mom	
1997	Paranoia	Saleswoman	
1998	O.K. Garage	Hotel Desk Clerk	
2000	CryBaby Lane	Mrs. Hunt	TV movie
2001	Lonesome	Eva	
2002	In America	Hospital Administrator	
2006	The House Is Burning	Mrs. Garson	
2006	Spectropia	Ball Guest	
2009	A Dog Year	Busybody Woman	uncredited
2011	Dream House	Heather Keeler	
2012	Surviving Family	Sister Mary Alice	
2013	The Suspect	Meredith	
2017	Can Hitler Happen Here?	Patricia	
2019	The Garden Left Behind	Dr. Brown	
2020	Tahara	Moreh Klein	
2020	Darcy	Frann	

=== Television ===
Year	Title	Role	Notes
1995	New York News	Hysterical Mom	Episode: "Good-Bye Gator"
1994	Law & Order	Young Woman	Episode: "Breeder"
2001	Law & Order: Special Victims Unit	Jean Weston	Episode: "Scourge"
2003	Law & Order	Mrs. Padgett	Episode: "Compassion"
2005	Third Watch	Lottie Pearson	Episode: "Kingpin Rising"
2009	Kings	Jane Llewellyn	Episode: "Judgment Day"
2009	Law & Order: Special Victims Unit	Betty Jean	Episode: "Solitary"
2014	Unforgettable	Sandra Branigan	Episode: "East of Islip"
2016	The Blacklist	William's Wife	Episode: "The Vehm (No. 132)"
2016	Mr. Robot	Chaplain	4 episodes
2017	Chicago Justice	Camille Osborn	Episode: "Double Helix"
2018	Bull	Juror #40	Episode: "Keep Your Friends Close"
2019	High Maintenance	Rita	Episode: "M.A.S.H."
2019	Pose	Catholic Woman	Episode: "Acting Up"
2021	Law & Order: Special Victims Unit	Joyce West	Episode: "The Five Hundredth Episode"
2022	Blue Bloods	Judge Cameron Miller	Episode: "On the Arm"
2022	The First Lady	Esther Lape	4 episodes
