= List of Native American superheroes =

This is the list of Native American superheroes, both as a superhero identity, and as fictional indigenous people of the Americas who are superheroes, from works of fiction (comic books, films, television shows, video games, etc.).

== Arcana Studios ==
- Matthew Carver (Kagagi: The Raven) Anishinabe "Kagagi"

== Azteca Productions ==
- Plainsman (Daniel Brightfeather, part Cherokee, part Navajo, Team Tejas)

== Blue Corn Comics ==
- Rain Falling (Hopi / Pueblo, Peace Party)
- Snake Standing (Hopi / Pueblo, Peace Party)

== Champion Comics ==
- Johnny Fox (Seminole tribe of Florida)

== Dark Horse Comics ==
- Naayééʼneizghání (Navajo, vampire slayer, Tales of the Slayers / Buffyverse)

== DC Comics ==
- Apache Chief (member of Super Friends)
- Arak (Quontauka Native)
- Aztek (Aztecs)
- Black Condor (Navajo)
- Butcher (Lakota)
- Captain Fear (Carib)
- Captain Thunder (Mohegan)
- Catalina Flores (Undisclosed Native Tribe in Mexico)
- Chief Crazy Horse (Renegades)
- Chindi
- Chronos (Aztecs)
- Corona (Inuk, Aquaman's first love and mother of Koryak)
- Dawnstar (Puebloan, member of Legion of Super-Heroes)
- Eagle Free (Prez)
- Equinox (Canadian Cree, member of Justice League United)
- Flying Fox (Quontauka Indian, member of Young All-Stars)
- Green Arrow of Earth-D (Justice Alliance of America)
- Hawk (half-Apache, son of Tomahawk)
- Koryak (half-Inuk, Aquaman's son)
- Man-of-Bats (Sioux, member of Batmen of All Nations)
- Manitou Dawn (pre-Apache, member of JLA)
- Manitou Raven (pre-Apache, member of JLA)
- Mirage (Indigenous, member of Team Titans)
- Night Eagle (ally of Superman)
- Owlwoman (Kiowa, member of Global Guardians)
- Pow Wow Smith (Sioux)
- Rain in the Face (Renegades)
- Raven (Navajo, Teen Titans: Earth One)
- Raven Red (Sioux, son and former sidekick of Man-of-Bats, member of Batmen of All Nations)
- Redbird (Batman sidekick, version of Robin in The Blue, The Grey, and The Bat)
- Russ Tenclouds (Metropolis S.C.U.)
- Seneca (Iroquois member of Cadre of the Immortal)
- Sky Alchesay (member of Aquaman's team The Others)
- Strong Bow (western hero of the 1800s)
- Super-Chief (Iroquois, Wolf Clan)
- Tall Tree (Renegades)
- Thomas Kalmaku (Inuk)
- Timber (half-Menominee, member of The Immortal Men)
- Wildstar (Puebloan, Dawnstar's ancestor, member of R.E.B.E.L.S.)
- Wise Owl (Shaman killed by Johnny Thunder in All-Star Western)
- Willpower (half-Apache, member of Primal Force)
- Wyynde
- Ya'Wara (Tapirapé, member of Aquaman's team The Others)

Vertigo

- Ghost Dancer (The Sandman)
- White Buffalo Woman (The Sandman)

Wildstorm

- Blackbird (Wetworks)
- Comanche (formerly of Stormwatch)
- Crossbones (Apache, Wetworks)
- Joe the Indian (half-Mexican, half-Navajo, Crimson)
- Pilgrim (Wetworks)
- Rainmaker (half-Apache, Gen^{13})
- Red Bird (Sioux, Black Ops)

== Goldtooth Productions ==
- Dallas Goldtooth (The Most Interesting Man on The Rez)
- Whitney Rencountre II (The Most Interesting Man on The Rez: Rapid City Protectors)
- Reggie 'Rocket' Taken Alive (The Most Interesting Man on The Rez: Spaulding Punks)
- Cyril 'Chuckie' Archambault (The Most Interesting Man on The Rez: Northern Tribezmen)

== Hexagon Comics ==
- Darkwing (Lakota)
- Ozark (Lakota)
- Plume Rouge
- Rakar (Lakota)

== Image Comics ==
- Barbaric (Special Operations Taskforce, former member of Freak Force; wife is Ricochet)
- Broadarrow
- Ian Nottingham (a.k.a. Excalibur of Witchblade, of British and Native American descent)
- Kodiak (New Men)
- Nighteagle (Master Magus of the Age)
- Ripclaw (Apache, member of Cyberforce)
- Stalking Wolf (a.k.a. Shaman's Tears)

== Marvel Comics ==
- American Avenger (Pacqui)
- American Eagle (Navajo)
- Black Crow (Navajo)
- Centurious of the Firm (Amerind)
- Cusick (Tuscarora), Timespirits (Epic)
- Crusader-X, the Earth-2122 version of Captain Britain is a Native American of unspecified origin
- Danielle Moonstar (Cheyenne, member of New Mutants, X-Force)
- Doot (Wawenoc), Timespirits (Epic)
- Echo (a.k.a. Crazy Horse, Ronin) (half Cheyenne, half Latina, member of New Avengers)
- Elisa Maza, police detective from the Gargoyles comic series, (half Hopi, half African American)
- Fire Eyes (Amerind, ally of Daimon Hellstrom)
- Forge (Cheyenne, member of X-Men & X-Factor)
- HighNote of the Young Gods (Part Colombian, part Native)
- Moonstalker (Inuk, member of Young Gods)
- Naze (Cheyenne, Forge's shaman teacher)
- Portal (member of same tribe as Puma)
- Pvt Jay Littlebear (of the Leatherneck Raiders)
- Puma (former enemy turned ally of Spider-Man, from an unnamed Arizona tribe)
- Red Warrior (Comanche)
- Red Wolf / Wildrun (Cheyenne, member of the Anachronauts)
- Red Wolf / Johnny Wakely (Cheyenne)
- Red Wolf / Thomas Thunderhead (Cheyenne)
- Red Wolf / William Talltrees (Cheyenne, member of the Rangers)
- Red Zeppelin (Unlimited Class Wrestling Federation)
- Redstone (Apache, member of Squadron Supreme, Earth S)
- Ringo Kid (half)
- Risque (Cuban Seminole, member of X-Corporation)
- Running Fish (half Apache, half Cibecue, Sunset Riders)
- Scalphunter, John Greycrow (Apache), mercenary, member of The Marauders and Krakoa's Hellions.
- Shaman (Sarcee, member of Alpha Flight))
- Silver Fox (Native Canadian, ally of Wolverine)
- Sitting Bullseye (Band of the Bland)
- Snowbird (half Inuk god, member of Alpha Flight)
- Spirit / Iron-Knife, Charlie (of G.I. Joe)
- Talisman (Sarcee, member of Alpha Flight)
- Talon (Derek Maza) leader of the Mutates from the Gargoyles comic series (half Hopi, half African American).
- Thunderbird (Apache, member of X-Men)
- T-bird, alternate universe version of Thunderbird, (Apache, Exiles member)
- Tomorrow Hawk (a.k.a. Ceyote. of New Breed and Eternals)
- Venus (cloned from the DNA of Goliath and Elisa Maza, Gargoyles comic series)
- Warpath (Apache, member of New Mutants, X-Force, X-Corporation, & X-Men)
- Werehawk (Futurians)
- Witch Woman (former enemy turned ally of Ghost Rider)
- Wyatt Wingfoot (Keewazi, associate of Fantastic Four)
- Zachery Moonhunter (of the Avengers)

== War Drums Studios / Mystic Comics ==
- Earth (Navajo, Tribal Force)
- Gan (Apache, Tribal Force)
- Little Big Horn (Sioux, Tribal Force)
- Thunder Eagle (Lakota, Tribal Force)

== Red Cloud Comics ==
- Jake Red Cloud, Quechua (Red Cloud Comics)

== Super Indian Comics ==
- Super Indian (Once a Rez Boy, Now a Super Hero) Comic book and radio series

== Independents ==
- Alma Grande, el Yaqui Justiciero (Mexican Yaqui, Publicaciones Herrerías, July 1961)
- Anarteq (Inuk) (Dozerfleet Productions)
- Anthar (Gold Key Comics & Valiant Comics)
- Broadarrow (Valiant Comics)
- Centaur (1/8 Cherokee, F.R.E.E.Lancers)
- Cloud-Splitter (PS 238).
- Jerônimo (from Jerônimo, o Herói do Sertão, RGE, 1957)
- Johnny Cougar (Seminole) (Tiger Fleetway, May 6, 1967)
- John Redfeather (from Spirit of the Wolf) (Wild Wolf Studio)
- Haokah the Thunder Being (Spirit of the Wolf) (Wild Wolf Studio)
- Coyote the Trickster (Spirit of the Wolf) (Wild Wolf Studio)
- Koda the Warrior (Lakota)
- Longhunter (Valiant Comics)
- Nighthawk (Navajo, F.R.E.E.Lancers)
- Scout (Apache, Eclipse Comics)
- Scratchbuilt (Half Miskito, Half Central American, F.R.E.E.Lancers)
- Stallion Canuck (Native Canadian, Created by Lou Douzepis, King Led Comics)
- Supermaya (Mayan, Mexican comic)
- Tall Tree (Freedom Fighters, Valiant Comics)
- White Buffalo Warriors (Valiant Comics)
- Wilde Knight
- Charles Smith (Red Dead Redemption)
- Jenny Everywhere (Jenny Everywhere)

== Newspapers ==
- Captain Chinook (from a Canadian newspaper, created by Jean Claude St. Aubin)
- MuttonMan, a comic in the Navajo Times, created by Navajo comedian Vincent Craig
- Patoruzú (Tehuelche, Argentine comic character created in 1928 by Dante Quinterno)

== Radio ==
- Straight Arrow (1948-1950, NABISCO promotional character)
- Super Shamou (Inuk, Inuit Broadcasting Corporation, 1980s)
- Tonto (a.k.a. Toro, Adventures of the Lone Ranger)

== Television ==
- Apache Chief (Apache, Super Friends)
- BraveStarr (BraveStarr Cartoon Series)
- Catwoman played by Eartha Kitt in the 1966 Batman TV series
- Delilah from the Gargoyles animated series (cloned from Elisa Maza and Demona's DNA, of multiractial heritage)
- Elisa Maza police detective from the Gargoyles TV series, (half Hopi, half African American)
- Geronimo of Kinnikuman series voiced by Kaneto Shiozawa (in Kinnikuman) and Eric Stuart (In Ultimate Muscle).
- Jade (Guatemala Clan, Gargoyles TV series)
- Kagagi: The Raven (Anishinabe)
- Long Shadow of Justice League Unlimited, voiced by Gregg Rainwater
- Nightwolf of Mortal Kombat: Defenders of the Realm voiced by Tod Thawley
- Obsidiana (Guatemala Clan, Gargoyles TV series)
- Super Shamou (Inuk, Inuit Broadcasting Corporation, 1980s)
- Talon (Derek Maza) leader of the Mutates from the Gargoyles animated series (half Hopi, half African American)
- Turquesa (Guatemala Clan, Gargoyles TV series)
- Tye Longshadow (Apache) of Young Justice, voiced by Gregg Rainwater
- Zafiro (Guatemala Clan, Gargoyles TV series)
- Tommy Oliver of the Power Rangers series
- Jessica Keynes (Oglala Lakota, Miraculous: Tales of Ladybug & Cat Noir)

== Video games ==
- Chief Thunder of Killer Instinct
- Michelle Chang of Tekken (half Native American, half Chinese)
- Julia Chang of Tekken (half Native American, half Chinese)
- Nightwolf of Mortal Kombat
- [TIW] Madrey of Planetside 2
- Domasi "Thommy" Tawodi of Prey (Cherokee)
- Tal' Set of Turok (series)
- Red Harlow of Red Dead Revolver (half Native American)
- Ratonhnhaké:ton, aka Connor of Assassin's Creed III (half Mohawk, half British)
- Delsin Rowe of Infamous: Second Son
- T. Hawk (fictional character in the Street Fighter series)

== Film ==
- Jake Red Cloud of Red Cloud: Deliverance (played by Alex Kruz)
- Gail of Old Town in the Sin City movie, portrayed by Rosario Dawson
- Nightwolf of Mortal Kombat Annihilation (played by Litefoot)
- Vadinho (Aztec, mentor of Pumaman, L' Uomo puma / Pumaman, ADR Films 1980)
- Tonto of The Lone Ranger (played by Johnny Depp)

== See also ==
- List of fictional Native Americans
