= Cast lists for Love, Loss, and What I Wore =

Love, Loss, and What I Wore is a play written by Nora and Delia Ephron based on the 1995 book of the same name by Ilene Beckerman. It is organized as a series of monologues and uses a rotating cast of five principal women. The play was originally produced as a part of the 2008 summer series at Guild Hall in East Hampton, New York and then as a benefit series at the Off-Off-Broadway DR2 Theatre in New York in early 2009. It was then produced as an ongoing commercial theatrical production at the Westside Theatre in New York. The original commercial production opened in 2009 Off-Broadway. The show has been performed on five continents and more than eight countries. It continues to play Off-Broadway and continues its United States national tour that began in the fall of 2011 in Chicago.

== Initial casts ==
The August 2008 production starred Linda Lavin, Karyn Quackenbush, Leslie Kritzer, Kathy Najimy and Sara Chase. Monday night readings were held from February 2 – March 9, 2009 at the Off-off-Broadway DR2 Theatre. The first cast there was Marian Seldes, Joy Behar, Katie Finneran, Heather Burns and Lucy DeVito Other participants in the original readings included Tyne Daly (who created the narrator character, Gingy, for the New York Production), Rosie O'Donnell, Samantha Bee, Rondi Reed, America Ferrera, Debi Mazar, Marlo Thomas, Blythe Danner, Christine Lahti, Parker Posey, Julie White, Kelly Bishop, Sarah Jones, Veanne Cox and Kristen Wiig.

February 2, 2009: Marian Seldes, Joy Behar, Katie Finneran, Heather Burns and Lucy DeVito
February 9, 2009: Debi Mazar, Rosie O'Donnell, Casey Wilson, et al
February 16, 2009: America Ferrera, Heather Burns, Joyce Van Patten, Kathy Najimy and Kristen Schaal
February 23, 2009: Tyne Daly, Rondi Reed, Rita Wilson, Samantha Bee, Becki Newton
March 2, 2009: Blythe Danner, Christine Baranski, Julie White, Parker Posey and Alia Shawkat
March 9, 2009: Kelly Bishop, Susie Essman, Kristen Wiig, Sarah Jones and June Diane Raphael

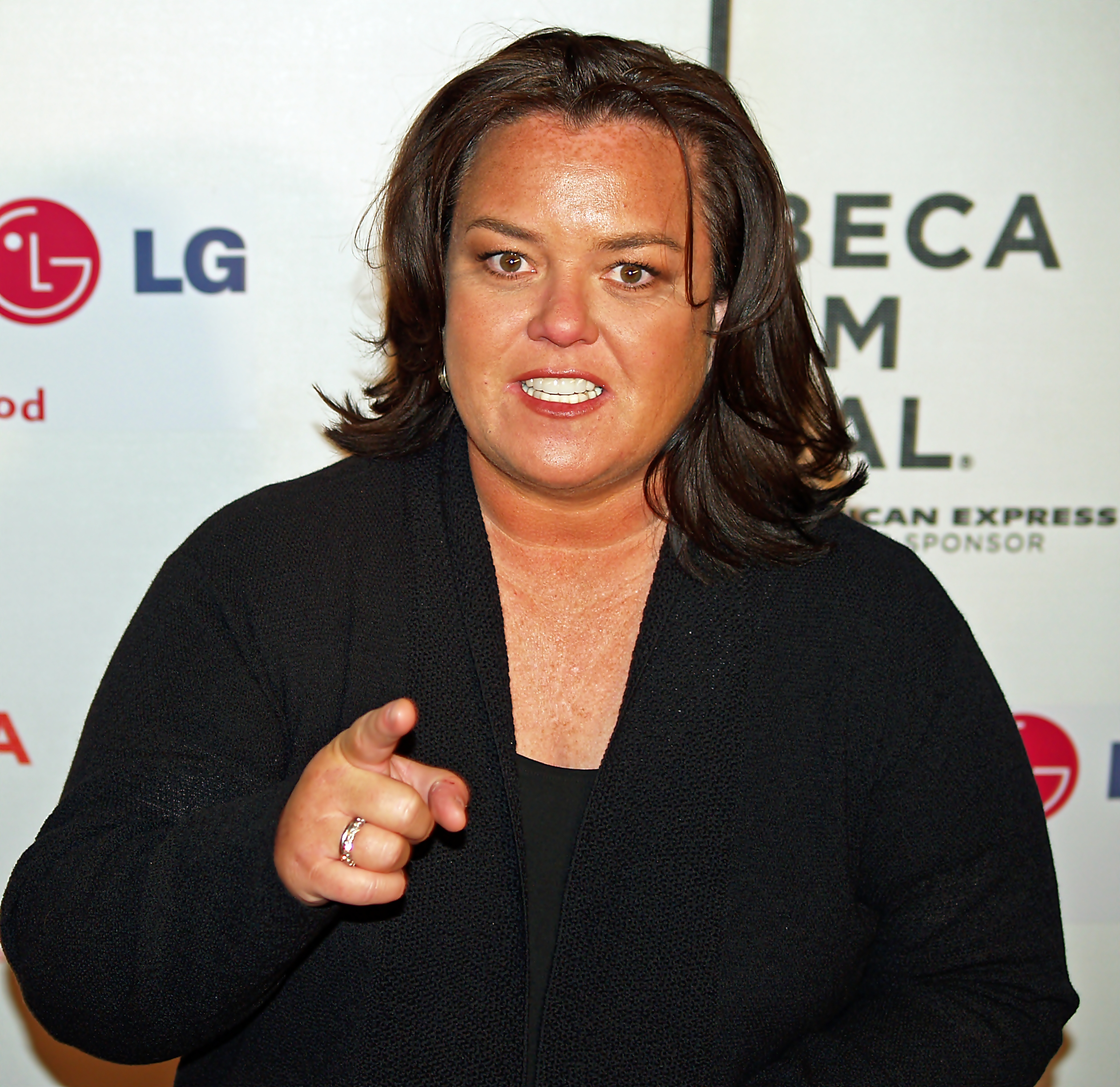
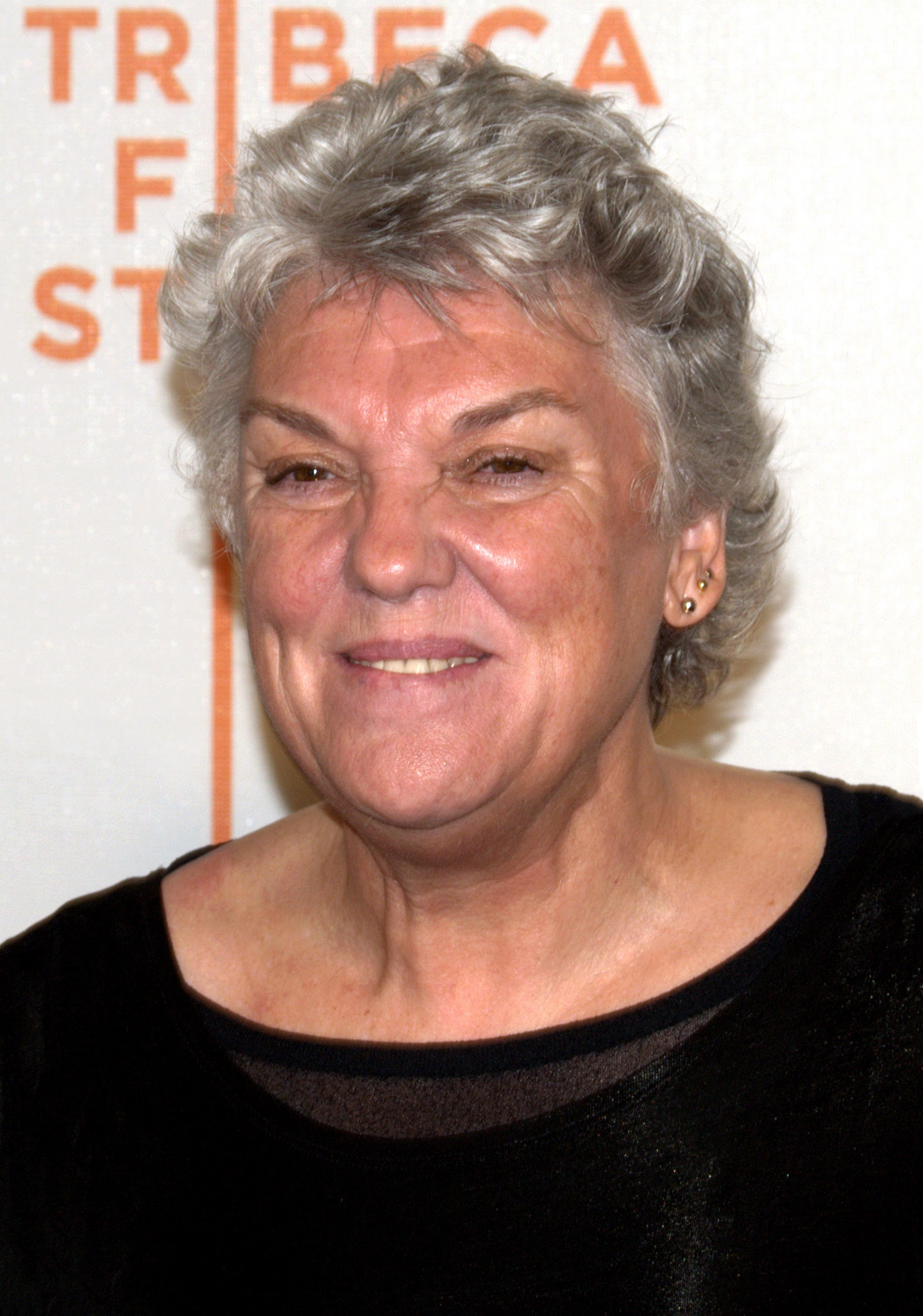
O'Donnell (left) and Daly (right) were nominated for 2010 Drama League Awards for their performances.

== Off-Broadway ==
The play was then performed for 3 consecutive runs beginning September 21, 2009 with each lasting 4 weeks and having an entirely new 5-person cast. The cast originally included Daly, O'Donnell, Bee, Katie Finneran and Natasha Lyonne. The rotating cast also included Mary Birdsong, Kristin Chenoweth, Lucy DeVito, Jane Lynch, Rhea Perlman, Mary Louise Wilson and Rita Wilson. Chenoweth was replaced in the last of the initial three 4-week runs by Finneran.

The first seven performances had seven different casts. The show has continued to use the casting strategy of rotating 4-week casts because it enables the production to persuade higher caliber actors to participate. This strategy was acknowledged by the industry when Tara Rubin, Merri Sugarman, Eric Woodall, and Lauran Schtuzel were nominated for the 2010 Casting Society of America Artios Awards for NY Off-Broadway Comedy/Musical Excellence in Casting. Off-Broadway casting has been announced through December 11, 2011. The ongoing Off-Broadway production continues to sponsor Dress for Success.

The following actresses have performed in the Off-Broadway production:

September 21 – October 18, 2009: Samantha Bee, Tyne Daly, Katie Finneran, Natasha Lyonne, Rosie O'Donnell
October 21 – November 15, 2009: Mary Birdsong, Tyne Daly, Lisa Joyce, Jane Lynch, Mary Louise Wilson
November 17 – December 13, 2009: Kristin Chenoweth, Lucy DeVito, Capathia Jenkins, Rhea Perlman, Rita Wilson
December 14, 2009 – January 4, 2010: Lucy DeVito, Katie Finneran, Capathia Jenkins, Carol Kane, Natasha Lyonne
January 6 – January 31, 2010: Katie Finneran, Michelle Lee, Debra Monk, Tracee Ellis Ross, Casey Wilson
February 3 – February 28, 2010: Janeane Garofalo, Joanna Gleason, Carol Kane, June Diane Raphael, Caroline Rhea
March 3 – March 28, 2010: Didi Conn, Fran Drescher, Jayne Houdyshell, Carol Kane, Natasha Lyonne
March 31 – April 25, 2010: Lucy DeVito, Judy Gold, Melissa Joan Hart, Jayne Houdyshell, Shirley Knight
April 28 – May 23, 2010: Anna Chlumsky, Julie Halston, LaTanya Richardson Jackson, Doris Roberts, Brooke Shields
May 26 – June 27, 2010: Penny Fuller, Rachael Harris, Diane Neal, Sherri Shepherd, Cobie Smulders
June 30 – July 25, 2010: Haylie Duff, Penny Fuller, Sharon Lawrence, Ashley Austin Morris, Myra Lucretia Taylor
July 28 – August 29, 2010: Jayne Houdyshell, Adriane Lenox, Allison Mack, Kate Mulgrew, Kristine Nielsen
September 1 – October 3, 2010: Helen Carey, Victoria Clark, Nancy Giles, Stacy London, Jamie-Lynn Sigler (replaced on September 21 by Ashley Austin Morris)
October 6 – October 31, 2010: Aisha de Haas, Erin Dilly, Barbara Feldon, Tovah Feldshuh, Ashley Austin Morris
November 2 – December 5, 2010: Tichina Arnold, Margaret Colin, Alicia Goranson, Ann Harada, Maria Tucci
December 8, 2010 – January 9, 2011: Brenda Braxton, Didi Conn, Kate Flannery, Loretta Swit, Mary Testa
January 12 – February 13, 2011: Alexis Bledel, Nikki Blonsky, Anita Gillette, Judy Gold, Pauletta Washington
February 16 – March 20, 2011: Katrina Bowden, Sabrina Le Beauf, Orfeh, Barbara Rhoades, Kim Zimmer
March 23 – April 24, 2011: Sonia Manzano, Donna McKechnie, Annie Starke, Fredi Walker-Browne, Rumer Willis
April 27 – May 29, 2011: Conchata Ferrell, Minka Kelly, AnnaLynne McCord, Anne Meara, B. Smith
June 1 – July 3, 2011: Emily Bergl, Emme, Julie Halston, Ashley Austin Morris, Susan Sullivan
July 6 – August 7, 2011: Aisha de Haas, Alison Fraser, Anita Gillette, Marla Maples, Zuzanna Szadkowski
August 10 – September 4, 2011: Marylouise Burke, Emmanuelle Chriqui, Ann Harada, Rosyln Ruff, Yeardley Smith
September 7 – October 2, 2011: Adriane Lenox, Janel Moloney, Ashley Austin Morris, Zuzanna Szadkowski, Joyce Van Patten
October 5 – October 30, 2011: La La Anthony, Dee Hoty, Samantha Mathis, Zuzanna Szadkowski, Concetta Tomei
November 2 – December 4, 2011: Jenny Allen, Maddie Corman, Eve Plumb, Amanda Setton, Zuzanna Szadkowski
December 7 – December 30, 2011: Emily Dorsch, Daisy Eagan, Sonia Manzano, Loretta Swit, Myra Lucretia Taylor
January 4, – January 29, 2012: Veanne Cox, Nancy Dussault, Katie Lee, Fern Mallis (through January 12), Eve Plumb (starting January 13), Lillias White
February 1, – February 26, 2012: Quincy Tyler Bernstine, Alexandra Silber, Robin Strasser, Zuzanna Szadkowski, Dawn Wells
February 29, – March 25, 2012: Sierra Boggess, Karyn Quackenbush, Joyce Van Patten, Ally Walker, Erica Watson, et al.

== Other casts ==
The play was next produced at the Geffen Playhouse in Los Angeles in 2010. Of the initial Geffen cast, all but Aaron had performed in the Off-Broadway run.

May 11 – June 6, 2010: Caroline Aaron, Carol Kane, Natasha Lyonne, Tracee Ellis Ross, and Rita Wilson
June 8 – July 3, 2010: Lucy DeVito, Conchata Ferrell, Justina Machado, Rhea Perlman, and Nancy Travis
July 7 – August 1, 2010: Tyne Daly, Kathryne Dora Brown, Bonnie Franklin, Glenne Headly, and Amy Pietz
August 4 – 29, 2010: Meredith Baxter, Paula Christensen, Florence Henderson, Gina Torres, and Marissa Jaret Winokur
September 1 – 26, 2010: María Conchita Alonso, Jami Gertz, Harriet Harris, Christine Lahti, and Jenny O'Hara
September 30 – October 24, 2010: Erica Ash, Winslow Corbett, Glenne Headly, Lauren Hutton, and Edie McClurg
October 27 – November 19, 2010: Teri Garr, Sandra Tsing Loh, Marianna Palka, Mimi Rogers, and Sally Struthers

The play has been staged in New York, Los Angeles, Toronto and Buenos Aires. The following were the Toronto casts:

July 16 – August 7, 2010: Paula Brancati, Andrea Martin, Sharron Matthews, Louise Pitre, and Mary Walsh
August 10 – September 4, 2010: Lauren Collins, Wendy Crewson, Cynthia Dale, Linda Kash, and Margot Kidder
September 10 – October 2, 2010: Jeanne Beker, Barbara Budd, and Sheila McCarthy, et al.

The US national tour began in Chicago in September 2011. The Chicago casts include the following:

September 14 – October 23, 2011:Nora Dunn, Felicia Fields, Roni Geva, Katie O'Brien and Barbara Robertson
October 25 – ?: Roni Geva, Cindy Gold, Taylor Miller, Loretta Swit (November 8), Whitney White
December 6, 2011 – January 1, 2012: Roni Geva, Katie O'Brien, Michelle Shupe, Erica Watson and Dawn Wells

It played in Sydney from January 3 – 30, 2011 with an opening cast of Natalie Bassingthwaighte, Judi Farr, Amanda Muggleton, Magda Szubanski and Mirrah Foulkes under the direction of Wayne Harrison with some minor modifications to localize some of the Americanisms.

It made its Asian Premier in Manila from July 14 – 17, 2011 at RCBC Plaza with a cast of Bituin Escalante, Cathy Azanza-Dy, Jay Valencia Glorioso, Menchu Lauchengco-Yulo, and Teresa Herrera and was directed by Michael Williams and Azanza-Dy.

In South Africa, the show was performed by a cast of Anne Power, Rika Sennett, Louise Saint-Claire, Sharon Spiegel-Wagner and Christel Mutambo from April 8 – June 12, 2011 at Studio Theatre, Montecasino near Johannesburg and a cast of Kate Normington, Sennett, Power, Mutombo and Spiegel Wagner at the Theatre on the Bay in Cape Town from June 15 to July 2 under the direction of Moira Blumenthal.

Love, Loss and What I Wore was directed by Joseph Fowler and presented in Dubai at The Madinat Theatre 16th - 18th October 2014 starring Christine Kempel, Hayle Doyle, Sara Farah and Sherita Harkness.

Love, Loss and What I Wore was the inaugural production of The Women's Company of Regina and was presented in Regina, Saskatchewan as part of the Regina International Fringe Theatre Festival (July 2-8, 2017). The production starred Abbey Thiessen, Jane Neumier, Angeline Stankewich, Robyn Sanderson, Gabrielle Dufresne, and Erin Johansen. The production was designed by Carson Walliser, produced by Landon Walliser, and directed by the company. This production differed from most by embracing a rich rainbow coloured design and featuring six actresses. In 2018, the production toured to several Fringe festivals across Canada including the Regina International Fringe Theatre Festival (July 11-15, 2018), the Hamilton Fringe Festival (July 19-29th, 2018), and the Edmonton International Fringe™ Theatre Festival (August 16-26, 2018). This production went on to be nominated for eight BroadwayWorld Regional Awards for the run at the Edmonton Fringe™ Festival, these included Best Actress in a Musical or Play (Non-Professional) nominations for Dufresne, Johansen, Neumier, Sanderson, and Stankewich. It went on to win three awards including Best Play (Non-Professional), Best Touring Show, and Best Costume Design (Professional) for Carson Walliser.
