= Roy Gokay Wol =

- רוי גוקי וול
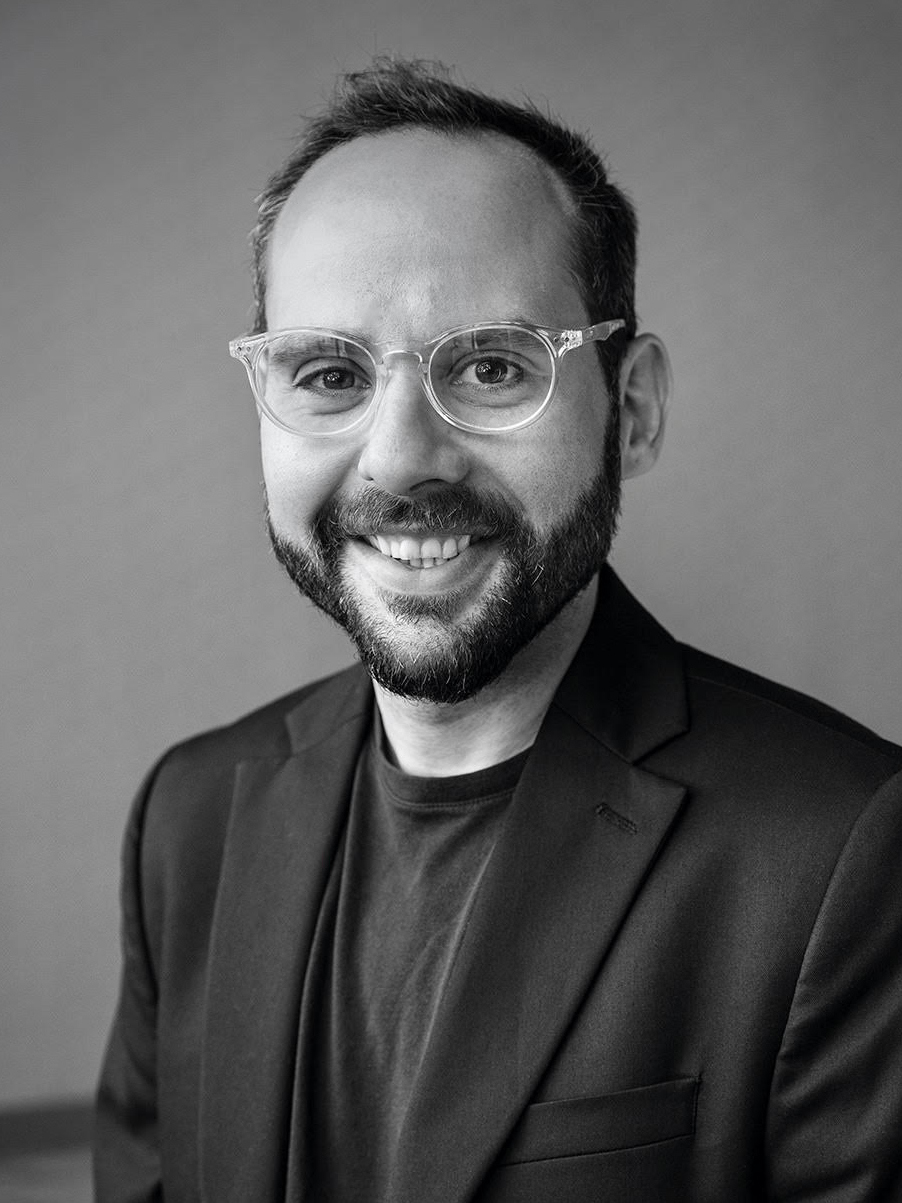
- Roy Wol, in Orléans, France at the 2021 EAVE Producers Workshop
- Born: Roi Itzik Yohay; February 13, 1984 (age 42); Tel Aviv, Israel
- Occupations: Film Producer, Director
- Years active: 2006-present
- Notable work: The Garden Left Behind

Roy Gokay Wol (Hebrew: רוי גוקי וול; born February 13, 1984) is a Turkish-Israeli award-winning film producer and director living in the United States. He is known for the film The Garden Left Behind starring Michael Madsen and Ed Asner; and directed the music video Try A Little Tenderness, starring Alice Tan Ridley.

== Life and career ==
Roy Wol was born in Israel. Raised in Turkey and Canada, Wol was born as the son of an Argentine mother and a Turkish father. He moved to the US in 2009 and has been working on film since then. Roy is the founder of Studio Autonomous, and has produced several films including Art Machine, Tom in America and, Bikini Moon directed by Academy Award nominee Milcho Manchevski.

Most recently, he produced the 2019 SXSW winning feature film, The Garden Left Behind, directed by Flavio Alves. The Garden Left Behind was selected to the 2017 IFP Lab, and stars Ed Asner and Michael Madsen. Roy has frequently collaborated with fellow producer and director Flavio Alves. In 2016 Wol and Alves pioneered the use of eBay as a crowdfunding platform. Their campaign raised over $100,000 through their website eBayMyFilm, and The Garden Left Behind became the first independent film to be funded substantially through donations and sales via eBay.

== Personal life ==
Roy Wol lives in Brooklyn, New York, and is currently writing a book about independent film producing.

== Filmography ==
=== Producer ===
- 2019: The Garden Left Behind
- 2018: Bikini Moon
- 2014: Tom in America
- 2012: A Wife Alone
- 2011: Art Machine
- 2011: Arkadya
- 2010: 57 Ways
- 2008: Kill Your Television
