= João Silvério Trevisan =

Brazilian author, screenwriter and film director

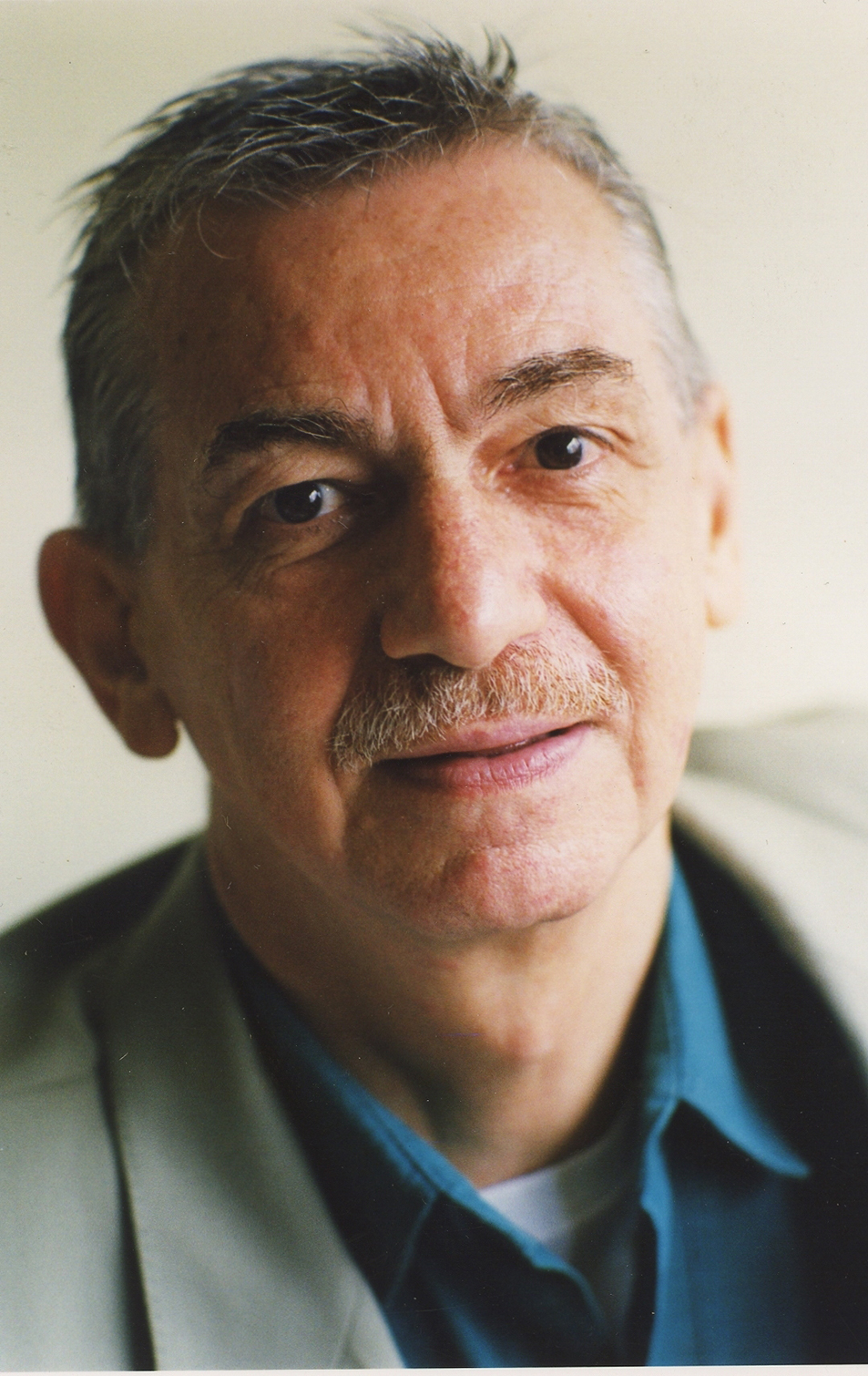
João Silvério Trevisan

João Silvério Trevisan (born June 23, 1944, in Ribeirão Bonito, São Paulo) is a Brazilian author, playwright, journalist, screenwriter and film director. He has published eleven books, including novels, essays, short stories, and journalism, and has also written plays and screenplays. Trevisan has been influential as a literary and cultural critic, particularly on gay and lesbian issues, and his works have been translated into English, Spanish, and German.

== Career ==
Early in his career in 1970, Trevisan wrote and directed a feature film, Orgia ou o Homem que Deu Cria, which was censored by the Brazilian military regime for almost ten years.

In 1976, Trevisan published his first collection of short stories, Testamento de Jônatas Deixado a Davi. This was followed by a book for children, As Incríveis Aventuras de El Cóndor, in 1980 and a novel, Em Nome do Desejo, in 1983.

He became known as one of Brazil's more important literary figures, noted especially for the quantity and diversity of his work.

In 2010, one of his short stories, The Secret Friend, was adapted as a short film directed by Flavio Alves. The film was shot in Brooklyn. It entered more than 80 film festivals and won 21 awards, including Best of the Fest at Palm Springs International Film Festival, the Storyteller Award at Savannah Film Festival, and the Van Gogh Award at the Amsterdam Film Festival.

== Literary prizes ==
Trevisan's best-known short story, Two Bodies in Vertigo, is included in the anthology The 100 Best Brazilian Story Tales of the Twentieth Century. He has won the Prémio Jabuti three times and the São Paulo Art Critics Association (APCA) Award three times, as well as several other honors. Despite his awards and distinctions, his work has been ignored by the Brazilian mainstream media.

== Gay activism ==
Between 1973 and 1976, Trevisan lived in Mexico and in the United States, where he had direct contact with the gay rights movement. In 1978, he founded SOMOS, the first gay rights organization in Brazil and, in the same year, the first gay news publication, O Lampião da Esquina. In 1982, he started research for his book, Devassos no Paraiso (Perverts in Paradise). This was published in 1986, and was at the time the most comprehensive study of the history of homosexuality in Brazil.

== Personal life ==
He currently resides in São Paulo, Brazil.

== Body of work ==
Film, as screenplay writer

- Contestação (short film, 1969)
- Orgia ou o homem que deu cria (feature length, 1971)
- Amigo Secreto (The Secret Friend, 2010)

Journalism

- O Lampião da Esquina

Literature

- Testamento de Jônatas Deixado a David (1976)
- As Incríveis Aventuras de El Cóndor (1980)
- Em Nome do Desejo (1983)
- Vagas Notícias de Melinha Marchiotti (1984)
- Devassos no Paraíso; also in English: Perverts in Paradise (1986)
- O Livro do Avesso (1992)
- Ana em Veneza; also Ana in Venice (1994)
- Troços & Destroços (1997)
- Seis Balas num Buraco Só: A Crise do Masculino (1998)
- Pedaço de Mim (2002)
- O Rei do Cheiro (2010)

Screenplay (adaptations)

- Doramundo by Geraldo Ferraz, directed by João Batista de Andrade (first treatment, 1977) - best film, scenography and director, Festival de Gramado, 1978
- A mulher que inventou o amor by Jean Garrett, (1981)

Theater

- Heliogábalo & Eu
- Em Nome do Desejo
- Troços & Destroços

== See also ==
- Literature of Brazil
- The Secret Friend official web site
