= The Garden Left Behind =

2019 film directed by Flavio Alves

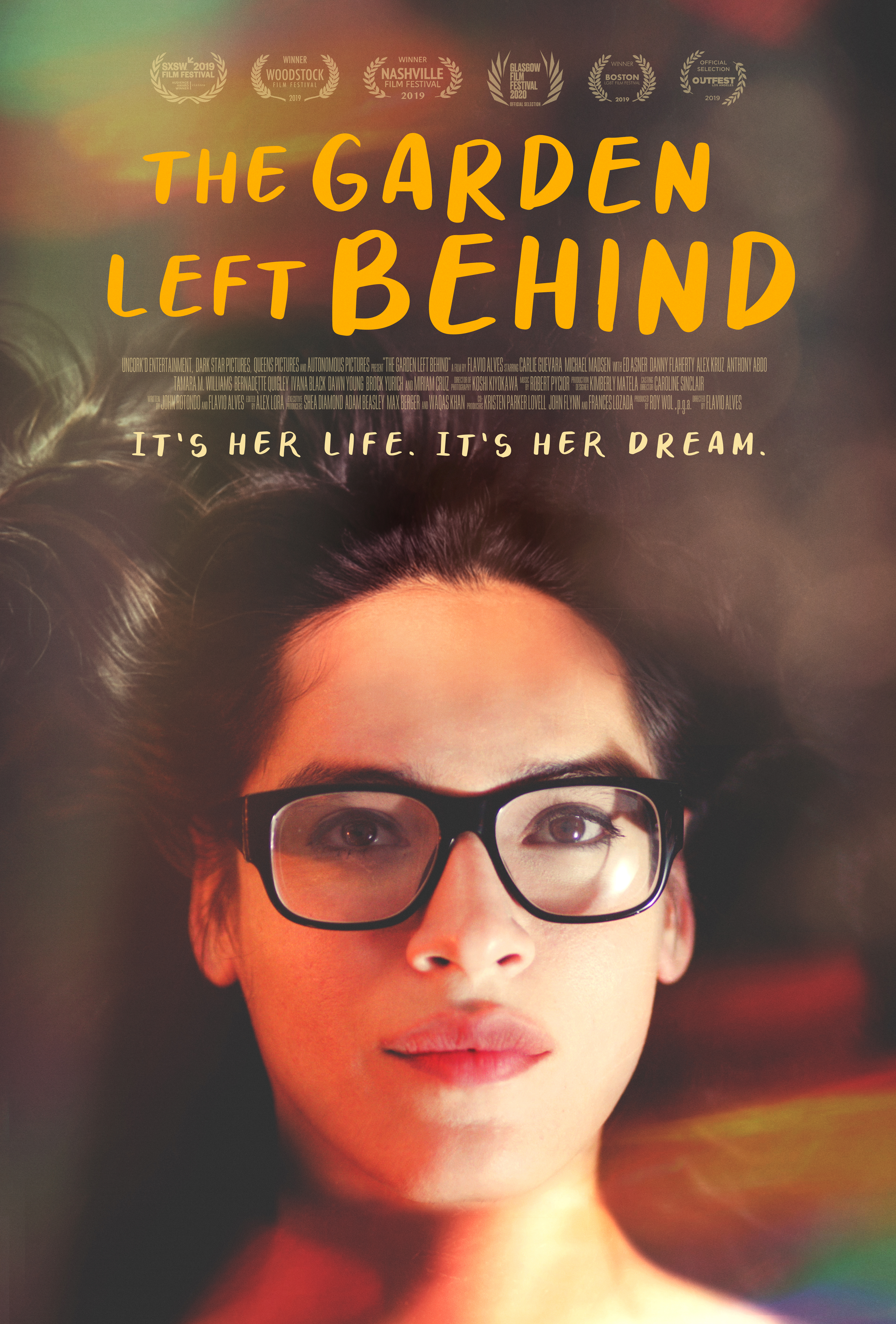
- Theatrical Poster
- Directed by: Flavio Alves
- Written by: John Rotondo; Flavio Alves
- Produced by: Roy Gokay Wol
- Starring: Carlie Guevara; Michael Madsen; Ed Asner; Daniel Flaherty; Alex Kruz; Anthony Abdo; Tamara M. Williams; Bernadette Quigley; Ivana Black; Dawn Young; Brock Yurich; Miriam Cruz
- Cinematography: Koshi Kiyokawa
- Edited by: Alex Lora Cercos
- Music by: Robert Pycior
- Production companies: Autonomous Pictures; Queens Pictures
- Distributed by: Uncork'd Entertainment
- Release dates: March 9, 2019 (SXSW); August 28, 2020 (United States)
- Running time: 88 minutes
- Country: United States
- Languages: English; Spanish

The Garden Left Behind is a 2019 drama film directed by Flavio Alves, and starring Michael Madsen, Ed Asner and Carlie Guevara. The story centers around the life of Tina Carrera, a Mexican trans woman, struggling to make a life for herself as an undocumented immigrant in New York City. The film premiered at SXSW in 2019, where it won the Audience Award. The Garden Left Behind became the first independent film to be funded substantially through donations and sales via eBay.

== Plot ==
Tina (Carlie Guevara), a 30-year-old transgender woman and her grandmother, Eliana (Miriam Cruz), have been struggling to make a life for themselves in New York since emigrating from Mexico when Tina was only five years old. Left alone to raise her grandchild, Eliana yearns to return to Mexico, while Tina struggles for acceptance as a transgender woman in America. Driving for an illegal taxi operation to save money for her transition, Tina battles the constant anxiety of being undocumented. Despite her trepidation, she meets with Dr. Cleary (Ed Asner), a psychologist, whose attempts to guide her though the process dredge up Tina's resistance and fear. After yet another brutal beating in the transgender community, she emerges as an outspoken advocate, a role that changes everything. When she joins a trans advocacy group, Tina gains courage and dignity, along with a secret admirer, Chris (Anthony Abdo), who works in the neighborhood bodega and longs for a different life as much as Tina does. Underlying this universal story of family, friends and community, is the theme of transphobia and the very real threat of violence toward women like Tina, especially trans woman of color.

== Cast ==
- Michael Madsen as Kevin
- Ed Asner as Dr. Cleary
- Carlie Guevara as Tina
- Daniel Flaherty as Oscar
- Alex Kruz as Jason
- Anthony Abdo as Chris
- Miriam Cruz as Eliana
- Tamara M. Williams as Carol
- Bernadette Quigley as Dr. Brown
- Frances Lozada as Officer Gottilla
- Ivana Black as Amanda
- Lea Nayeli as Brianna
- Brock Yurich as Chester
- Kristen Parker Lovell as Regina
- Dawn Young as Miriam
- Devin Michael Lowe as Shannon

== Production ==
=== Development ===
Script development began in January 2014 when director Flavio Alves and co-writer John Rotondo delved into the subject of transgender immigrants in New York City, conducting research and interviews while working closely with the local trans community. In addition, Alves and Rotondo worked closely with advocates and health care professionals in order to authentically portray the steps involved in the transition process for transgender individuals.

The Garden Left Behind was selected as one of ten films by IFP to be developed in their 2017 Narrative Lab project. In addition, the film has received support from organizations such as GLAAD, PFLAG, NALIP, New York Foundation for the Arts, New York Council for the Arts, Film Society of Lincoln Center, Trans Filmmakers Project, and Jerome Foundation.

While in pre-production, Alves and his team raised more than $100,000 through a crowdfunding campaign via eBay. The film became the first independent film to be funded substantially through donations and sales via eBay.

=== Casting ===
In the spring of 2016, newcomer Carlie Guevara was cast in the lead role of Tina. Guevara decided to audition after reading the script and feeling a close connection to the character. She recalls that the script's "powerful, intense and necessary" ending propelled her to audition for her first acting role.

The Garden Left Behind cast transgender actors in all transgender roles as well as Latinx performers in all Latinx roles, and bilingual performers/native Spanish language-speakers in Spanish-speaking roles.

=== Filming ===
Principal photography began in New York City in September 2016.

The production introduced more than 50 new transgender filmmakers to the industry, with representation behind and in front of the camera.

== Release ==
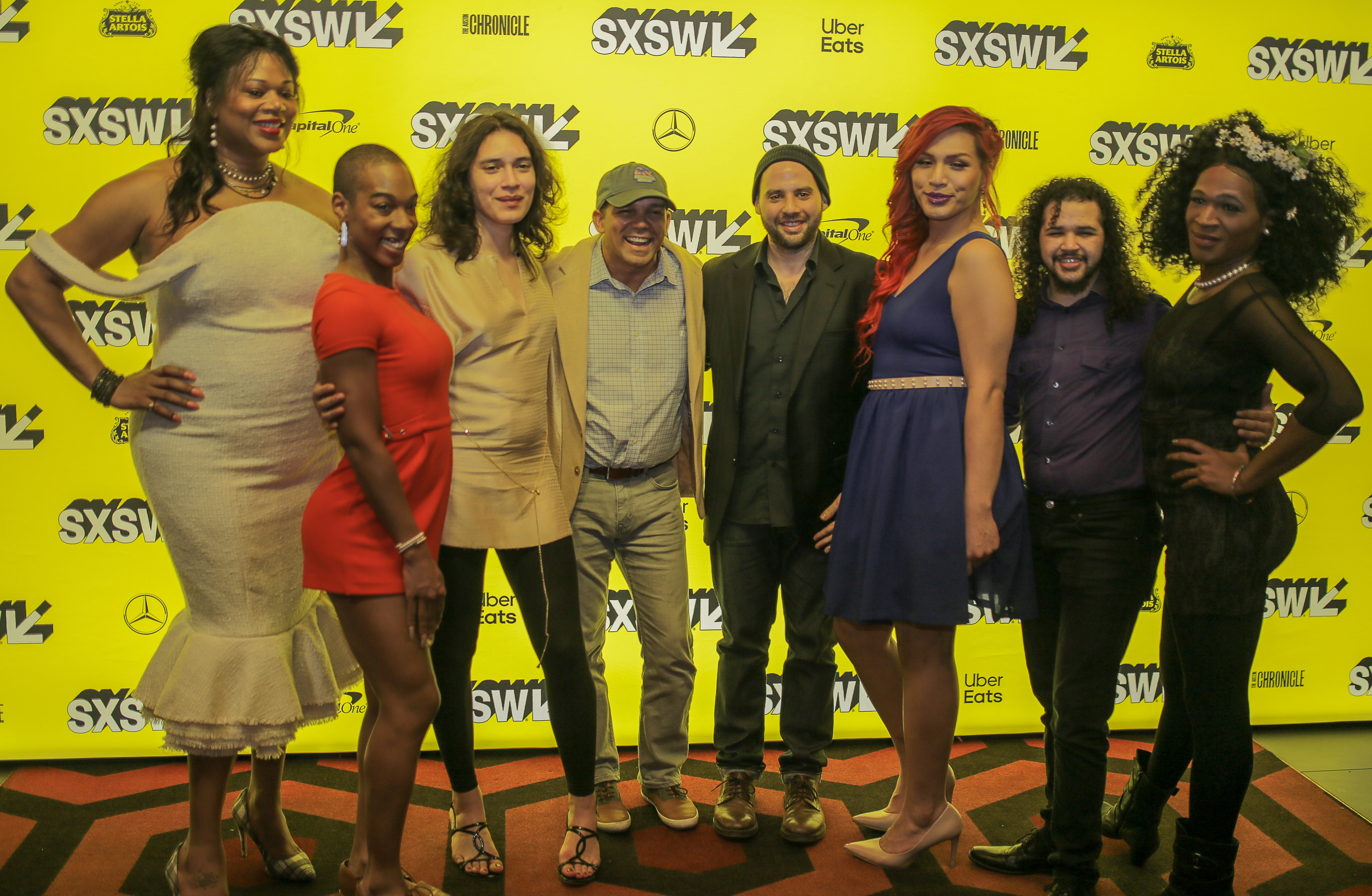
Black, Williams, Guevara, Alves, Wol, Nayeli, Lowe, and Lovell at the 2019 SXSW Film Festival

The Garden Left Behind premiered at SXSW on March 9, 2019, where it won the Audience Award.

As a film in the Visions category, director Flavio Alves and team were selected for being "audacious, risk-taking artists in the new cinema landscape who demonstrate raw innovation and creativity."

Uncork'd Entertainment and Dark Star Pictures released the film in virtual theaters in North America on August 28, 2020, due to the COVID-19 pandemic. The film was released on VOD on September 8, 2020.

Following the North American release, the film will be released internationally by Hewes Pictures.

== Reception ==
=== Critical response ===
The Garden Left Behind opened to positive reviews from critics. On review aggregator Rotten Tomatoes, the film has a 91% approval rating, based on 67 reviews with an average rating of 7.2/10. The site's critics consensus states, "The Garden Left Behind draws on one immigrant's journey to offer graceful, thought-provoking commentary on timely sociopolitical themes." It appeared on the website's List of 200 Best LGBTQ Films of All-Time, ranking #39.

Caryn James of The Hollywood Reporter said "It's one thing to decide to make a movie about the struggles of the transgender community and violent attacks on it. But it's far harder to turn that message into a film as natural and graceful as The Garden Left Behind."

Randy Myers of The Mercury News said "The Garden Left Behind will break your heart; a film of utter grace, poignancy and deep understanding."

Nathaniel Rogers of The Film Experience said that the film is "a must-see festival hit", noting that "[Alves] risks alienating audiences... but he does so to stay true to the overall vision and aims of the movie."

Asher Luberto of The Playlist said the film is "genuinely moving…with a big message."

Allan Hunter of Screen Daily called the film "an assure, poignant first feature… admirably unsentimental, sympathetically observed and warmly played."

Kristy Puchko of RogerEbert.com said that the film's finale is "haunting as it is humane, and makes for a film that's raw, challenging, and unforgettable."

=== Controversy ===
The film, according to producers and director Flavio Alves, was initially met with resistance and rejected by some major LGBTQ film festivals, including Frameline in San Francisco and Inside Out in Toronto. In response, trans activists spoke out by writing emails and making calls, urging festival organizers to show the film, despite some concerns with the film's bold and occasionally jarring content. Many members of the community have continued to defend the film and its willingness to speak out about the issues of violence against the Trans community and specifically women of color, with violent assaults and murder on the rise in the current climate. The festivals that initially rejected the film reversed their decisions after hearing from the activists and the film was well received at their screenings.

=== Accolades ===
After winning the Audience Award at SXSW, The Garden Left Behind has received over 20 awards at festivals around the US and the world, including Jury Awards at the Nashville Film Festival, Woodstock Film Festival, and Heartland Film Festival.

The QueerScope Film Festivals in Germany selected The Garden Left Behind as the recipient of the QueerScope Award for Best International Debut Feature Film at the 2019 Hamburg International Queer Film Festival.

The film was invited to participate in the Film Independent Film Forum as a Case Study Video Keynote to discuss the unique fundraising and press campaigns that propelled the project to success.

Award	Year	Category	Recipient(s)	Result	Ref.
SXSW Film Festival	2019	Audience Award	Flavio Alves, Roy Gokay Wol	Won	
SXSW Film Festival	2019	Adam Yauch Hörnblowér Award	Flavio Alves	Nominated	
Bentonville Film Festival	2019	Best of the Fest Award	Flavio Alves, Roy Gokay Wol	Won	
Bentonville Film Festival	2019	Best Competition Narrative	Flavio Alves, Roy Gokay Wol	Nominated	
Cleveland International Film Festival	2019	American Independents Competition Award	The Garden Left Behind	Nominated	
Nashville Film Festival	2019	Grand Jury Prize for New Director's Feature	Flavio Alves	Won	
Woodstock Film Festival	2019	Honorable Mentions for Best Editing	Alex Lora Cercos, Frank Dale Arroyo	Won	
Woodstock Film Festival	2019	Maverick Award for Best Film	Flavio Alves, Roy Gokay Wol	Nominated	
Heartland Film Festival	2019	Social Impact Award	Flavio Alves, Roy Gokay Wol	Won	
Heartland Film Festival	2019	Grand Prize for Best Narrative Feature	The Garden Left Behind	Nominated	
Florida Film Festival	2019	Best Narrative Feature	The Garden Left Behind	Nominated	
Hamburg LGBT Film Festival	2019	QueerScope Debut Film Award	Flavio Alves, Roy Gokay Wol	Won	
Glasgow Film Festival	2020	Audience Award	The Garden Left Behind	Nominated	
Fargo Film Festival	2020	Ruth Landfield Award	Flavio Alves, Roy Gokay Wol	Won	
Fargo Film Festival	2020	Best Narrative Feature	The Garden Left Behind	Nominated	
National Association of Latino Independent Producers	2020	Best Latinx Director	Flavio Alves	Won	
National Association of Latino Independent Producers	2020	Best Latinx Film	The Garden Left Behind	Nominated	
Cinema Tropical	2020	Best U.S. Latinx Film	The Garden Left Behind	Nominated	
