= Art Machine =

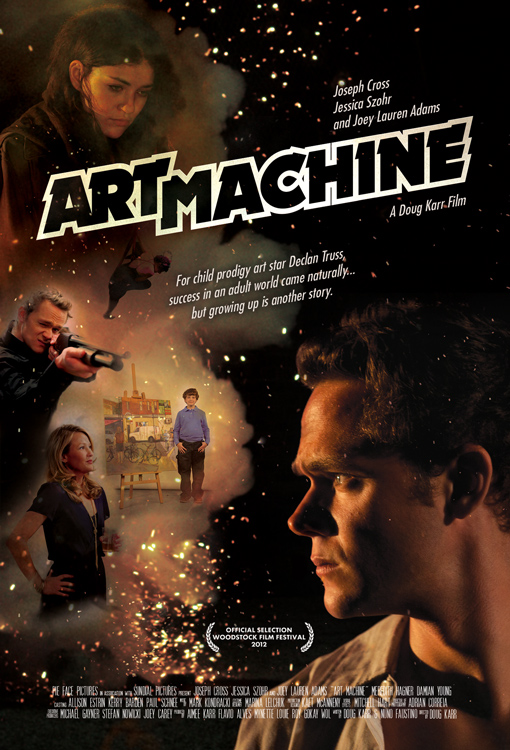
- Directed by: Doug Karr
- Written by: Doug Karr; Nuno Vieira Faustino
- Produced by: Aimee McCabe; Flavio Alves; Mynette Louie; Roy Gokay Wol
- Starring: Joseph Cross; Jessica Szohr; Joey Lauren Adams
- Cinematography: Adrian Correia
- Release dates: October 12, 2012 (Woodstock Film Festival); February 6, 2014 (United States)
- Country: United States
- Language: English

Art Machine is a 2012 comedy film written and directed by Doug Karr and starring Joseph Cross, Jessica Szohr, and Joey Lauren Adams.

== Cast ==
- Joseph Cross – Declan
- Jessica Szohr – Cassandra
- Joey Lauren Adams – Prudence
- Damian Young – Serge
- Meredith Hagner – Alexia
- Lynn Cohen – Roberta
- Robert Beitzel – Flash
- Lucas Papaelias – Agit
- Christopher Abbott – Cap’n Tar
- Stephanie Ellis – Ingrid
- Nicki Miller – Raquel
- Ashley Austin Morris - Brunette
