= O Lampião da Esquina =

- April 1978 cover
- Launched: April 1978
- Ceased publication: June 1981
- Language: Portuguese
- City: Rio de Janeiro, São Paulo
- Country: Brazil

O Lampião da Esquina was one of the first publications specifically reaching out to a homosexual readership in Brazil. O Lampião da Esquina ran from April 1978 until June 1981. The newspaper consisted of 37 issues between its beginning and end. The publication of the newspaper was based out of Rio de Janeiro and São Paulo, however the paper circulated throughout all of Brazil.

After the passing of the Institutional Act #5 during the Brazilian Military dictatorship, the press experienced harsh censorship endangering any journal or magazine that spoke ill of the dictatorship within Brazil. During the abertura and slow return to democracy begun by President Ernesto Geisel, the press and activist groups were able to speak more freely than in the earlier years of the dictatorship. O Lampião da Esquina arose as an alternative newspaper to the mainstream press outlets at the time. The newspaper was founded following the example of Winston Leyland’s Gay Sunshine Journal, a gay newspaper founded by Leyland out of the San Francisco Bay Area. The title of the newspaper was a play on the Brazilian folk hero “Lampião” or Virgulino Ferreira da Silva, a famous bandit leader in the Brazilian Northeast in the 1920s and 1930s.

The editorial staff consisted of eleven editors. Adão Costa was a journalist and painter. Aguinaldo Silva was a journalist with former collaborations with other alternative presses such as Opinião and Movimento, in addition to a writer, and he focused on political issues in the paper. Antônio Chrysóstomo was a journalist specializing in popular music. Clóvis Marques was a journalist, film critic, and translator. Darcy Penteado was a visual artist and writer whose book “A Meta” published in 1977 was hugely important in the fight against LGBT discrimination in Brazil. Francisco Bittencourt was a poet, art critic, and journalist. Gasparino Damata was a journalist and writer who had edited an anthology in the past dealing with histories of homosexuality. Jean-Claude Bernadet was a film critic and was one of the theorists of the Cinema Novo movement. João Antônio Mascarenhas was a lawyer, journalist, and translator. João Silvério Trevisan was a filmmaker and writer who would go on to write one of the most important books on LGBT issues in Brazil, Perverts in Paradise. Peter Fry, a British immigrant to Brazil and Cambridge University trained anthropologist on Afro-Brazilian religions and sexuality.

The newspaper fashioned itself as a newspaper, with a clearly leftist slant, which would give voices to all movements of the time, including LGBT movements, feminist movements, Black, and Indigenous movements. Although the newspaper featured many articles and features on many different movements, the newspaper remained mainly geared towards a gay male audience.

Near the end of the magazine's run, a split began among the editors. Factions of the editors wanted to push the magazine in a more political direction, clearly taking leftist stances on important issues of the time, while others wanted to keep a neutral stance to the magazine and make it a place for all ideologies. This caused a rift amongst the editing team. In addition, Antônio Chrysóstomo, after informally adopting a young homeless girl, was arrested and accused of pedophilia. Many believe the accusation was because he was an openly gay man, and used the adoption as an excuse to accuse him of something. Due to his connection to O Lampião da Esquina, the staff feared persecution from the military police, and decided to shut the paper down.

== See also ==
- João Silvério Trevisan
- Aguinaldo Silva
- Luiz Mott
- Winston Leyland
- LGBT History in Brazil
