= Don Rosler =

American songwriter

Don Rosler is an American lyricist, songwriter and record producer.

Rosler collaborated in writing some tracks with ten-time Grammy Award winner Bobby McFerrin and award-winning co-producers Linda Goldstein and Roger Treece on VOCAbuLarieS, which garnered three 2010 Grammy nominations. McFerrin's experimentation for new and innovative voice improvisations led his composer and producer to Rosler, who translated McFerrin's wordless vocal articulations into rhythmic lyrics using a collage of languages, including McFerrin's own invented one. Rosler was the recipient of a SESAC 2010 Jazz Award in recognition of his outstanding contribution; the most compelling masterpiece, as Jazz Times notes, is "Messages," "a cornucopia of languages constructed by lyricist Don Rosler that rises like a melodious Tower of Babel, exalting the incomparable beauty of universal harmony."

Of the many compositions Rosler lyrically wrote for VOCAbuLarieS, "Brief Eternity" and "Messages" were originally commissioned by Grant Gershon, artistic director of the Los Angeles Master Chorale. These compositions had their world premiere at the Walt Disney Concert Hall in 2003. Rosler and Treece also teamed up to write a vocal rendition of Pat Metheny/Lyle May's "September 15th" for the Swimming to London album by The King's Singers and a composition called "When Love Wins the Day" for the Chicago Children's Choir.

Rosler is also the co-writer and co-producer of John Margolis' debut album John Margolis: Christine's Refrigerator, the first of many creative collaborations between these two artists. The title track was awarded Song of the Year by Just Plain Folks Music Organization and was featured on the Kitchen Sisters' "Kitchen Stories" report (NPR's "Morning Edition") and on their audio-book, "Hidden Kitchens." In 2013 Pulitzer Prize winning journalist, Jim Dwyer wrote about "Christine's Refrigerator" in The New York Times for his "About New York" column after singer-songwriter Christine Lavin created a video for the song with the help of fans and enthusiasts of the song. Another track from the John Margolis: Christine's Refrigerator record "Tanta Belleza (So Much Beauty)" was prominently featured in the HBO/Cinemax film The Kidnapping of Ingrid Betancourt.

Most recently, Don Rosler is the writer and producer of the acclaimed concept album Rosler's Recording Booth (original songs inspired by Wilcox-Gay Recordio and Voice-o-Graph booth records), featuring Spottiswoode, Tam Lin, Terry Radigan, Jeremy Sisto, John Margolis, Jon Albrink, Isabel Keating, Tamara Hey, Kathena Bryant (from The Hippy Nuts) and Rosler. Rosler's Recording Booth was nominated by the Independent Music Awards for "Best Concept Album" in 2011 and one of the songs "Doris From Rego Park" was featured in The New York Times . Many other tunes from this record received considerable airplay across the U.S.
