= Viola Harris =

American actress (1920-2017)

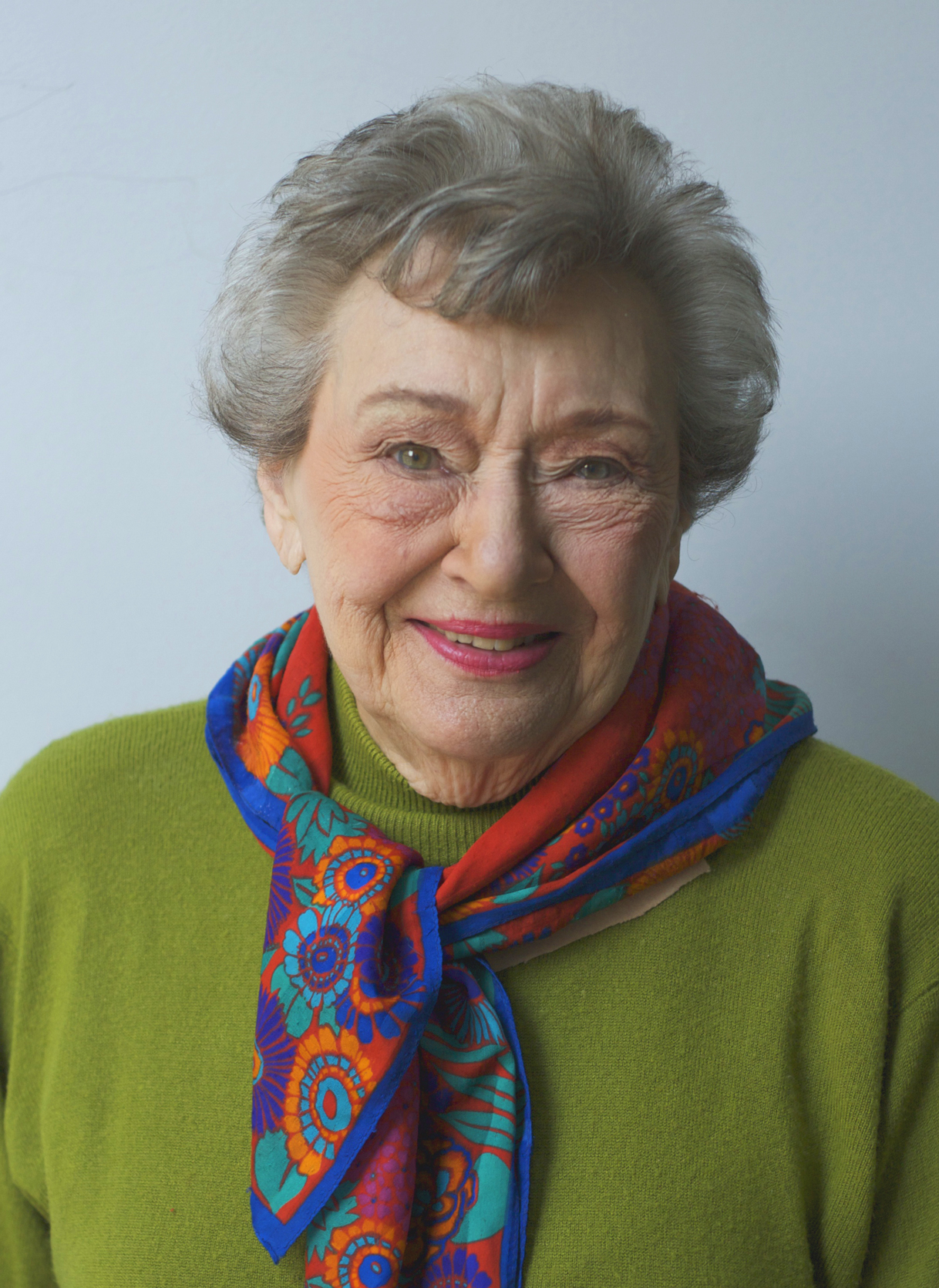
- Viola Harris during filming of The Secret Friend
- Born: July 5, 1920; Baltimore, Maryland, U.S.
- Died: August 23, 2017 (aged 97); New York City, U.S.
- Occupation: Actress
- Years active: 1953–2017
- Spouse: Robert H. Harris (19??-1981; his death)
- Children: 1

Viola Harris (née Sainer; July 5, 1920 – August 23, 2017) was an American actress known for roles in television, theater, and film from the 1950s to the 2010s.

== Early years ==
Harris's father, A. L. Sainer, was an attorney in New York who also operated the Deertrees Theatre in Harrison, Maine.

== Career ==
Harris appeared in a number of films including Woody Allen's Deconstructing Harry in 1997, Choke in 2008, The Other Guys in 2010, and Sex and the City 2 in 2010.

In 2010, she starred in the short film, The Secret Friend, directed by Flavio Alves. Harris received positive reviews for her role in the film. Phil Hall of Film Threat, who gave the film a positive score for example, argued that Harris "truly deserves to be in the center of the spotlight."

On stage, Harris worked in summer stock theatre for a number of years. She also was a standby for the Broadway production of Zelda (1969).

== Family ==
She was married to actor Robert H. Harris until his death in 1981 at 70. They had one son, Steven Lee Harris, who passed away in 2021, and a daughter, Sunny Dee.

== Death ==
Harris died August 23, 2017, in New York City at age 97. She was interred at Cedar Park Cemetery in Paramus, New Jersey. Her funeral was held at the Plaza Jewish Community Chapel in New York, New York, where she was a member.

== Filmography ==
Year	Title	Role	Notes
1958	High School Hellcats	Linda Martin	
1958	The Lost Missile		
1962	Don't Knock the Twist	Helen - the Fashion Editor	Uncredited
1965	The Slender Thread	Telephone Supervisor	
1968	Funny Girl	First Nighter	Uncredited
1975	Whiffs	Miss Zonen	
1977	Fire Sale	Helen	
1978	Good Guys Wear Black	Airline Ticket Agent	
1989	That's Adequate	Carlotta Duprez	
1997	Deconstructing Harry	Elsie	
1998	Sour Grapes	Selma Maxwell	
2002	Crooks	Mrs. Tobleroni	
2004	The Amazing Floydini	Ida	
2007	Noise	Elderly Woman	
2008	Choke	Eva Muller	
2010	Sex and the City 2	Gloria Blatch	
2010	The Other Guys	Mama Ramos	
2016	My Dead Boyfriend	Ms. Schulz	

== Television ==
Year	Title	Role	Notes
1961	Rawhide	Mrs. Besson	S3:E21, "Incident of His Brother's Keeper"
