= Odysseus' Gambit =

Odysseus’ Gambit
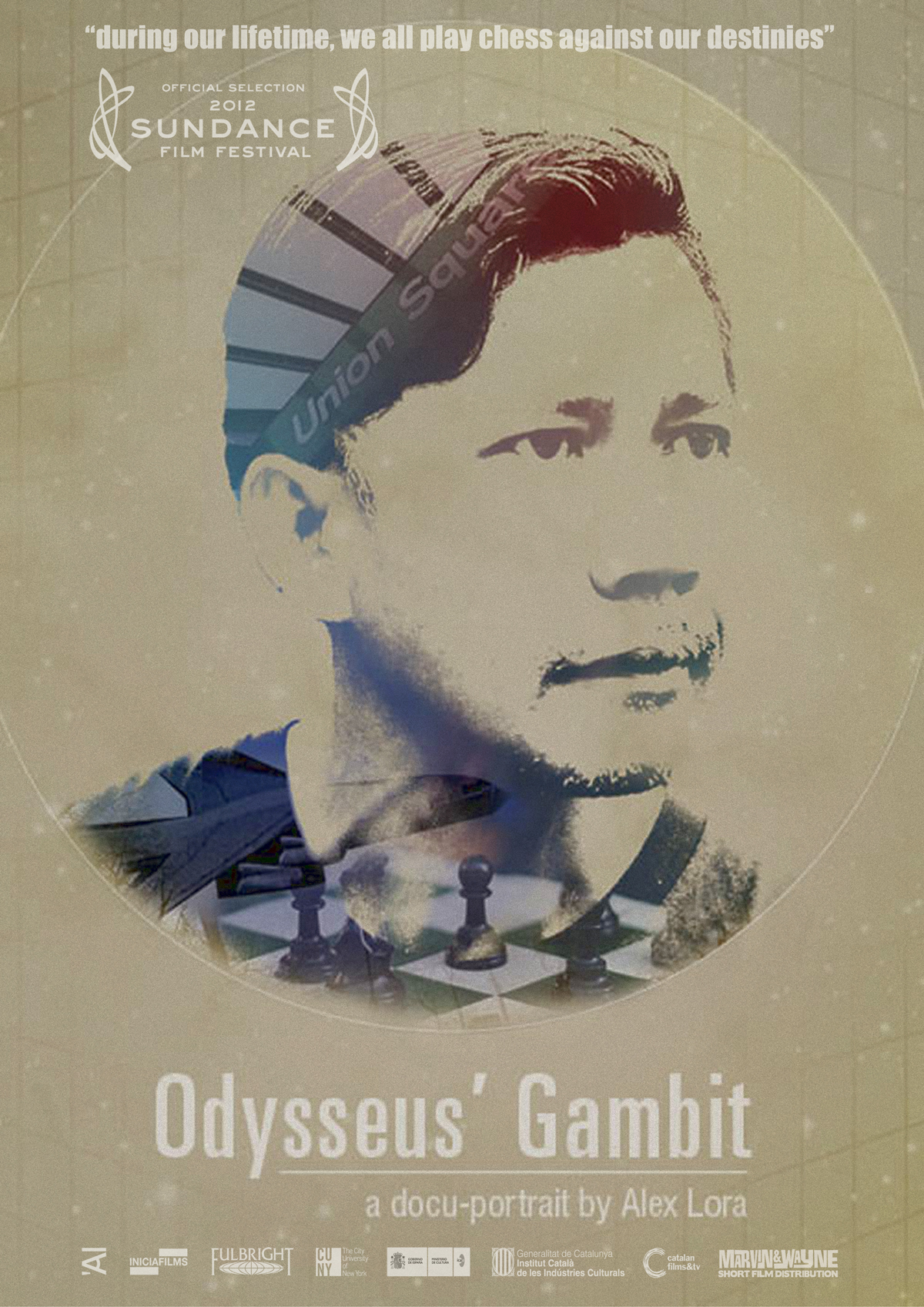
- Theatrical Poster
- Directed by: Alex Lora Cercos
- Written by: Alex Lora Cercos
- Produced by: Flavio Alves; Valérie Delpierre
- Cinematography: Alex Lora Cercos; Milan Maric
- Edited by: Alex Lora Cercos
- Release date: 2011
- Country: United States
- Language: English

Odysseus' Gambit is a 2011 documentary film, directed by Alex Lora Cercos, about a homeless Cambodian immigrant who maintains his livelihood and sanity by playing chess in the heart of Manhattan. The film was nominated for the Best Short Filmmaking Award at the 2012 Sundance Film Festival.

== Plot ==
Saravuth Inn was one of the most interesting human beings you could find in New York's Union Square. There, he used to play chess with people, getting five dollars for each game that would allow him to make it in the city one more day. Through the rules of chess and his conversations with other players and walkers, we got to know the story of this American of Cambodian origin who was airlifted after the Vietnam War to find a better life. But unfortunately, those good intentions got trapped in a glitch of the capitalist system.

== Reception ==
Odysseus' Gambit entered more than 70 film festivals and received multiple awards, including the Golden Dragon for Best Short at 52nd Krakow Film Festival and Best Documentary award at the 29th Tehran International Short Film Festival.
