= Red Cloud: Deliverance =

- Written by: Alex Kruz
- Starring: Alex Kruz
- Production company: Wolf Circle Productions
- Release date: 2013
- Country: United States
- Language: English
- Budget: $13,000

Red Cloud: Deliverance is a 2013 film, about a Native American gun for hire, Jake Red Cloud, played by Alex Kruz, who is befriended by a young emotionally damaged girl Ann (Breanna Lakatos). The film champions the importance of children and their emotional life which the main character uses Native American spirituality to heal. Based on the comic book character Jake Red Cloud, Quechua from Red Cloud Comics in 2014, Red Cloud: Deliverance was awarded the Spirit of Comic Con by Wizard Entertainment to show at Comic Con Conventions during 2014 to 2015. The film and Alex Kruz won several notable awards at Mexico International Film Festival, Action On Film International Film Festival, Accolade Competition, Bare Bones International Film Festival, DC Independent Film Festival, Amiens International Film Festival, and nominated for best performance by the Maverick Movie Awards.

The film was named "One of the Top 10 Comic Book Movies of All Time" by Cinema Crazed.

== Plot ==
Jake Red Cloud, a Native American gun for hire with a mysterious past, needs a place to lie low. With a flashy bankroll, he persuades attractive Jeanine Parker to rent him a room. Jake quickly learns that Parker is nothing but a chain smoking, promiscuous drunk that neglects and ignores her daughter Ann. Desperate for attention, Ann befriends Red Cloud and soon the two develop a spiritual bond of friendship, which leads Jake to the revelation that something in his life is missing. Before he can act his past threatens to extinguish his life and the lives of those around him.
