= The Secret Friend =

2010 film directed by Flavio Alves

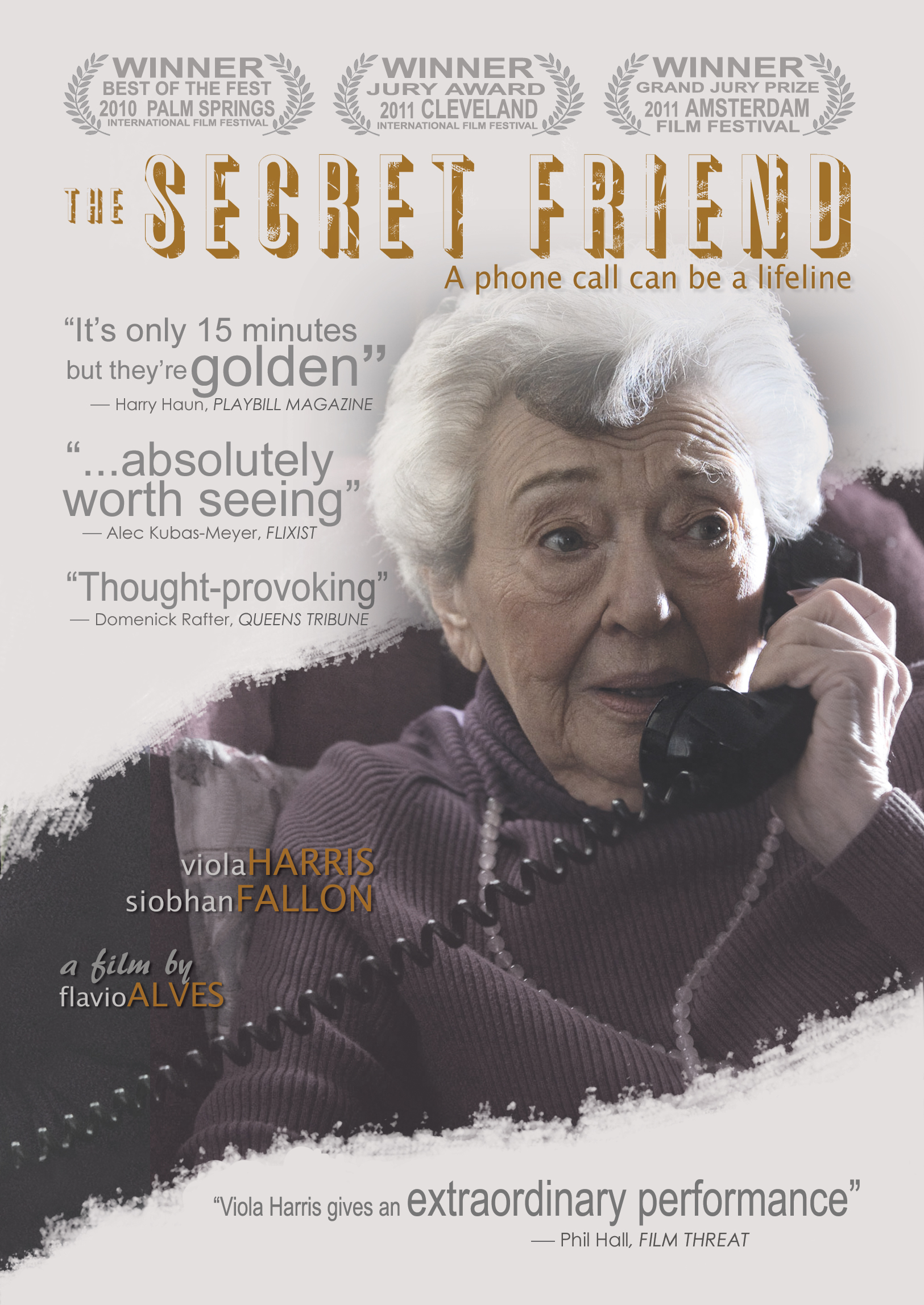
- Directed by: Flavio Alves
- Screenplay by: Flavio Alves
- Story by: João Silvério Trevisan (short story)
- Produced by: Nicholas Eisenberg; Raina Oberlin; Fernando Pinheiro
- Starring: Viola Harris; Siobhan Fallon; Richard Scott; Beau Hauser
- Cinematography: Adam McDaid
- Edited by: Matt Maltese; Chris Houghton
- Music by: Jack Woodbridge
- Release date: June 27, 2010 (Palm Springs)
- Running time: 15 minutes
- Countries: Brazil; United States
- Languages: English; Portuguese

The Secret Friend is a 2010 comedy-drama film based on the 1997 short story of the same name by Brazilian writer João Silvério Trevisan. The film, directed by Flavio Alves, features Viola Harris and Siobhan Fallon in the major roles. The film differs substantially from the original short story, which initially created some tension between the writer and the director. Filming took place in early 2009, mainly in Brooklyn, New York, and debuted at the 2010 Palm Springs International Film Festival, where it was chosen as Best of the Fest. The film centers around the character and life of Anna Marshall, a lonely, elderly widow living in a suburb of New York City, who develops a mysterious friendship with a silent caller. Although a screenplay for a feature version of the short film was written, as of 2011, it has not been officially greenlit.

== Plot ==
An elderly widow, Anna Marshall (Harris), lives in isolation following the death of her beloved husband. With no friends and an estranged son, Anna is a senior citizen alone in the world—obsolete and discarded. The only visitor since her husband's funeral is her sympathetic neighbor, Julia (Fallon). But with seemingly little in common, their polite tea break ends far too quickly, leaving Anna unable to ask for the companionship she desperately longs for as her nervous neighbor quickly leaves to attend to her children.

Anna's empty days are filled with restless routines and ticking clocks until a silent stranger calls. With this, Anna's phone rings every day promptly at 3:30pm. At first, Anna finds the calls intrusive and tells the stranger the calls are invading her privacy, but as the calls continue, Anna finds herself waiting for her phone to ring. When the stranger calls 15 minutes late one afternoon, Anna realizes just how dependent she has become on the calls and does something that completely surprises herself. She talks to the stranger: “Who are you? Are you a man or a woman? Are you married?”

In desperation, Anna begins to befriend her prankster. An odd and mysterious friendship evolves as Anna recounts the events of her days and her life experiences with startling honesty. The daily phone calls grow in duration—lasting hours with Anna feeling newly inspired and connected if only by a silent phone call.

Happy weeks and months pass until New Year's Eve arrives. Dressed to the nines, Anna pops a cork and toasts her silent friend. At the stroke of midnight, the silence is broken at last when the stranger speaks. Anna is startled—overjoyed and incredulous. But Anna's phone never rings again. Devastated, she turns to the phone company frantic to find the name and number of her caller. The manager tells Anna that the number is private and that by law he is unable to reveal the caller's name or number. Inconsolable, he encourages Anna to get a private number and assures her that if she does, she'll never be ‘bothered’ again. Anna's return to her bleak life of isolation. With no one to talk to and with no other recourse, Anna is compelled to action that surprises none as much as herself.

== Cast ==
- Viola Harris as Anna Marshall
- Siobhan Fallon as Julie
- Richard Scott as Telephone Company Manager
- Beau Hauser as Street Reporter
- Melvin Shrebnick as Older Man

== Reception ==
The Secret Friend garnered multiple awards and nominations. Since its premiere at Palm Springs International Film Festival in 2010, the film entered more than 80 film festivals and won 21 awards all over the world, including Best of the Fest at Palm Springs International Film Festival, the Storyteller Award at Savannah Film Festival, the Van Gogh Award at the Amsterdam Film Festival, and Jury Prize for Best Women's Short Film at Cleveland International Film Festival, among others. It has also received an overall positive reception from critics, with most reviews singling out Viola Harris's performance. Phil Hall of Film Threat, who gave the film a positive score for example, argued that Viola Harris "truly deserves to be in the center of the spotlight." Harry Haun of Playbill called the film a "Golden" and Felix Vasquez Jr. of Cinema Crazed called it "a slice of life" and gave the film three and a half stars out of four."

== Awards ==
- 2011 Jury Prize for Best Drama Short - Costa Rica International Film Festival
- 2011 Jury Award for Best Short Film - Valley Film Festival
- 2011 Special Jury Award for Best Short Film - Downbeach Film Festival
- 2011 Jury Award for Best Short Film - Atlanta Underground Film Festival
- 2011 Jury Award for Best Short Film - Jornada Internacional de Cinema da Bahial
- 2011 Audience Award for Best Trailer - World Music and Independent Film Festival
- 2011 Audience Award for Best Short Film - Hyart Film Festival
- 2011 Jury Award for Best Short Film - Hardacre Film Festival
- 2011 Jury Award for Best Actress (Viola Harris) - CineFiesta
- 2011 Audience Award for Best Short Film - Indianapolis International Film Festival
- 2011 Jury Award for Best Short Film - Las Vegas International Film Festival
- 2011 Van Gogh Award for Best Short Film - Amsterdam Film Festival
- 2011 Special Jury Award for Best Short Film - Canada International Film Festival
- 2011 Jury Prize for Best Women's Short Film - Cleveland International Film Festival
- 2011 Jury Award for Best Drama - Griffon International Film Festival
- 2010 Cine Golden Eagle Award for Best Short Film - CINE
- 2010 Jury Award for Best Fiction Short - Rockport Film Festival
- 2010 Special Jury Award - Savannah Film Festival
- 2010 Best of the Fest - Palm Springs International Film Festival
