= Tom in America =

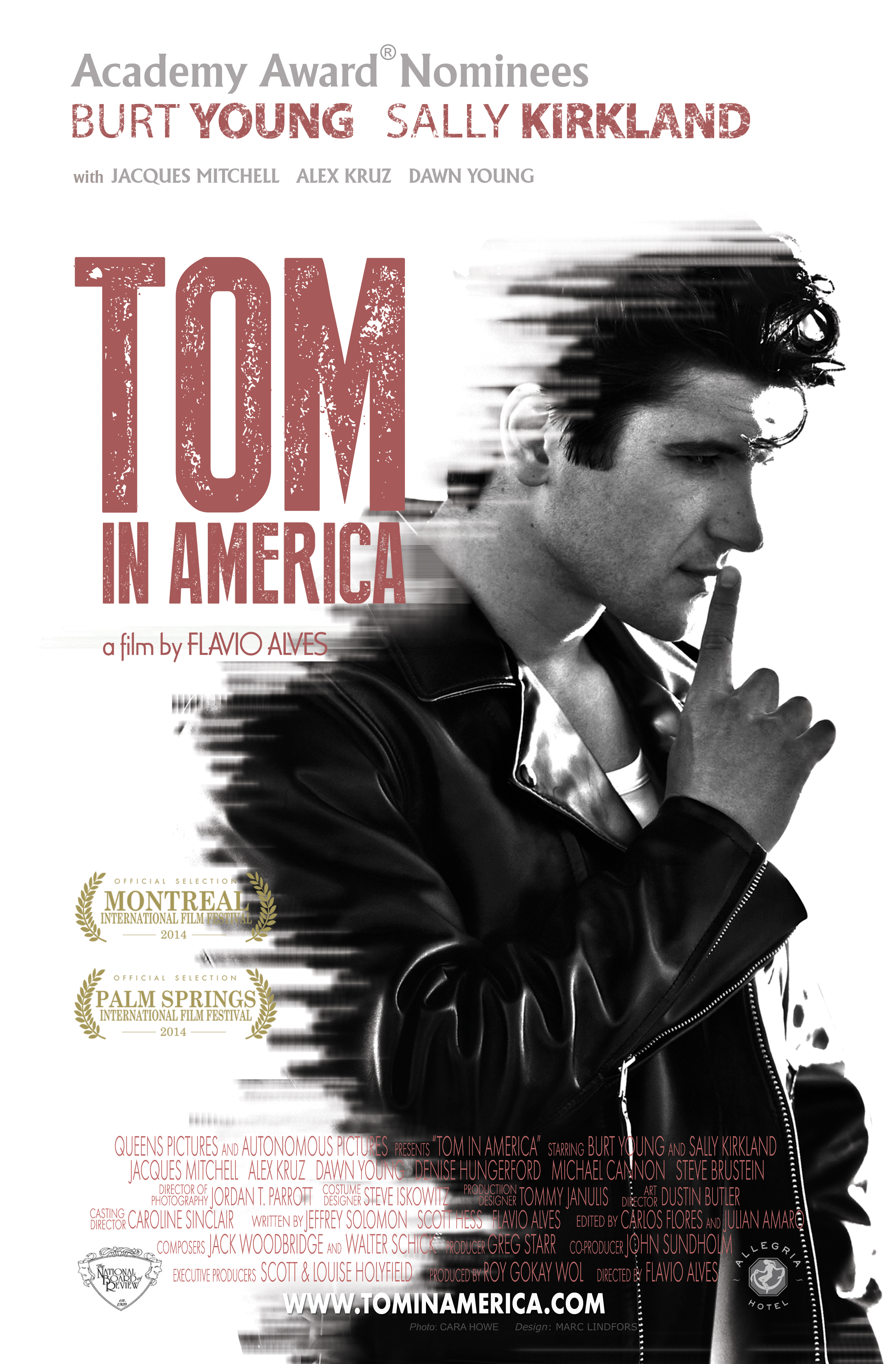
- Theatrical Poster
- Directed by: Flavio Alves
- Written by: Jeffrey Solomon; Scott Alexander Hess; Flavio Alves
- Produced by: Roy Gokay Wol; Greg Starr
- Starring: Burt Young; Sally Kirkland; Jacques Mitchell; Alex Kruz; Dawn Young; Denise Hungerford
- Cinematography: Jordan T. Parrott
- Edited by: Julian Amaro; Carlos Flores
- Music by: Jack Woodbridge; Walter Schick
- Release date: June 17, 2014
- Country: United States
- Language: English

Tom in America is a short film directed by Flavio Alves and starring Academy Award nominees Burt Young and Sally Kirkland. The story centers around the life of a married elderly man living in a Long Island suburb of New York City who, while rummaging through trash in search of things to sell at the local flea market, finds a Tom of Finland doll that triggers a long-ignored impulse.

== Cast ==
- Burt Young as Michael
- Sally Kirkland as Betty
- Jacques Mitchell as Tom
- Alex Kruz as Gus
- Dawn Young as Michele
- Denise Hungerford as Suzanne
- Michael J. Cannon as Chuck
- Steve Brustien as Doctor Hesse
- Erika Woods as Weather Woman
- Scott Schafer as Small Man
- Mitch Giannunzio as Big Man
- Eddie Sass III as Young Michael
- Wendy Callard-Booz as Old Woman

== Release ==
Tom in America had its world premiere at the 20th Palm Springs International Film Festival in June 2014.
