= The Hippy Nuts =

American rock band

- Origin: New York, New York
- Genres: Rock, Rock and Roll, Rhythm and Blues, Country, Roots Rock
- Years active: 1993-Present
- Members: Kathena Bryant; Tim Champion
- Past members: Shannon Ford (drums); T.Bag Jade (bass); Alice Ripley (vocals); Paul Ossola (bass); Tom Curiano (drums, BG vocals); Roger Greenawalt (ukulele); Joe Izzo (drums); Dave Eggar (cello, piano); Joe Mowatt (percussion); Mark Epstein (bass and Rhodes); Mark Doroba (guitar); Larry Heinemann (bass); John Andrews (guitar); Basil Rodericks (vocals); Dave Varrialle (drums); Carl Stickler (vocals); Mark Richard Ahlman (vocals); Joseph A. Bellantuono (bass); Chuck Henderson (bass); Susan Gates (keyboard); Bill Ryland (drums)
- Website: Official Site

The Hippy Nuts are an American rock band in New York City, New York.

Singer Kathena Bryant (from Greenville, Texas) and guitarist/producer Tim Champion (from Seattle, Washington) began collaborating in 1993. By 1995, they were performing as a duo in downtown Manhattan venues like the Cottonwood Cafe, Cowgirl Hall of Fame, and The Bottom Line. They added a full band and adopted the name The Hippy Nuts in 1996. Champion produced Bryant's solo album, Highway, in 1998, followed by The Hippy Nuts albums Hardcore Mellowdriven (2004) and Before the Fall of Onions or Tales... (2007). The latter received positive reviews, including a nod from the Village Voice Pazz & Jop Awards in 2008. The Hippy Nuts perform regularly around Manhattan, often at Banjo Jim's on the Lower East Side.

The Hippy Nuts have worked with a number of notable artists. Tony Award winner Alice Ripley has contributed background vocals on several Hippy Nuts tracks, including "I Feel Lucky Tonight". Noted photographer Ben Glass directed the Nuts' music video for "Sometimes a Feeling", and independent filmmaker Frank Keraudren directed "Working for Love" and "Beulah Land".

In January 2012, The Hippy Nuts commenced their Southern Immersion Tour in support of their third studio album, I Feel Lucky Tonight (2012); the tour included dates in Memphis, Dallas-Ft. Worth, and Jonesboro, Arkansas, and ended in New York, New York. On July 28, 2012, they played the Rock Out for Radical Radio show hosted by WFTE 105.7 FM in Scranton, Pennsylvania. "I Feel Lucky Tonight" earned positive reviews from The Daily News (PA) WeHeartMusic.com, which described the record as having "a lot of soul" and praised guitarist Champion's sound as "jazz and soul distortion" that has been "perfected".

== Discography ==
- Highway (1998)
- Hardcore Mellowdriven (2004)
- Before the Fall of Onions or Tales... (2007)
- I Feel Lucky Tonight (2012)
