= Erica Watson =

American actress and writer (1973–2021)

- Born: Erica Faye Watson; February 26, 1973; Chicago, Illinois, U.S.
- Died: February 27, 2021 (aged 48); Montego Bay, Jamaica
- Education: Columbia College Chicago (BA, MA)

Erica Faye Watson (February 26, 1973 – February 27, 2021) was an American actress, comedian and writer. She is best known for her roles in Precious and Chi-Raq.

== Early life and education ==
Watson was born on February 26, 1973, and grew up in Chicago. She attended St. Thomas the Apostle Elementary School and Kenwood Academy High School. She graduated from Columbia College Chicago in 1998 with a degree in film directing and a masters in Master of Arts in entertainment and media management in 2005.

== Career ==
Following graduation, Watson moved to New York City where she performed comedy and a one-woman show in 2010 which examined her identity a plus-size Black woman. She returned to Chicago after the show's tour where she took on roles in Precious, Chi-Raq, Empire, and The Chi.

== Personal life ==
She died of complications from COVID-19 in Montego Bay, where she had been living until her death, one day after her 48th birthday during the COVID-19 pandemic in Jamaica. She was 48 years old.

== Filmography ==
=== Film ===
Year	Title	Role	Notes
2006	Dirty Laundry	Clarine	
2009	Precious	Sheila	
2013	Side Effects	Processing Nurse	Uncredited
2014	Top Five	Woman on the Street #1	
2015	Chi-Raq	Sugar Pie	

=== Television ===
Year	Title	Role	Notes
2014	Love That Girl!	Shop Lady	Episode: "Gullible Is as Gullible Does"
2015	Chicago Fire	Waitress	Episode: "Forgiving, Relentless, Unconditional"
2015, 2018	Empire	Ruth / Danielle	2 episodes
2018	The Chi	Miss Tiny	2 episodes
