= Ashley Austin Morris =

American actress

- Born: Ashley Sue Morris; San Antonio, Texas
- Occupations: Comedian, playwright, actress
- Years active: 2004–present
- Known for: Francine Carruthers on The Electric Company

Ashley Austin Morris (born Ashley Sue Morris) is an American comedian, playwright, and stage, television, and film actress. She is best known for her role as Francine Carruthers in the revival of the PBS Kids children's series The Electric Company, which ran from 2009 to 2011.

== Career ==
Morris was born in San Antonio, Texas. After finishing high school, she joined a comedy troupe called "Viva La Vulva!" and contributed to the group's writing and sketch comedy. The following year, she enrolled at the University of North Carolina School of the Arts and co-starred in a production called Be Good, Daniel, a short comedy romance. She also wrote Libido Limbo, a play about Lady M, Nora, Blanche, and Medea being trapped in purgatory and being saved by Hillary Clinton, which was a finalist at Atlanta's Young Playwrights Festival.

Morris moved to New York City after graduating from the University of North Carolina School of the Arts, and landed roles in off-Broadway productions, first as Edith in Die, Mommie, Die! and then in Paper Dolls. She also performed stand-up comedy and starred for three seasons as Francine Carruthers, the leader of the Pranksters and a character with a very high opinion of herself and the power to generate violet word balls, in the 2009-2011 revival of The Electric Company, an educational children's program that employed sketch comedy and other entertaining devices to help elementary school children develop their grammar and reading skills and shown on the Public Broadcasting Service .

While performing on The Electric Company, Morris continued to also act on stage, including in the New York City off-Broadway productions Isabel and Bees, Love, Loss, and What I Wore, and In the Daylight, and appeared in episodes of the television shows Ugly Betty, The Good Wife, and Gravity.

After The Electric Company stopped making new episodes, she joined the rotating cast of Reading Under the Influence, and appeared in episodes of The Big Bang Theory and Desperate Housewives.

She was also in the video for "K.I.A. (Killed in Action)" from the album Shaka Rock by Jet, and had roles in the movies Premium Rush, Art Machine, Generation Um..., Putzel, Joke Writer, and Sully. She has also continued to perform stand-up comedy routines, mainly in New York City.

== Selected appearances ==
=== Film ===
Date of U.S. Release	Name	Role	Notes
May 28, 2004	Be Good, Daniel (short)	Maggie	North Carolina School of the Arts
August 24, 2012	Premium Rush	receptionist	Columbia Pictures
October 12, 2012	Art Machine	brunette	Pie Face Pictures
May 13, 2013	Generation Um...	girl date	independent
April 8, 2014	Putzel	Naomi	Stouthearted Films
October 18, 2014	Joke Writer	Jess	independent
September 9, 2016	Sully	Emily	Warner Brothers
July 13, 2018	Dead Sound	Alexa	Adler Films

=== Stage ===
Date	Name	Role	Production Company/Notes
October 10, 2007 (previews); October 21, 2007 (official) – January 2008	Die, Mommie, Die!	Edith Arden	
August 13, 2008 – August 23, 2008	Paper Dolls		Lively Productions and Métropole Ink New York International Fringe Festival; Fringe Award for Outstanding Ensemble
September 8, 2009 (preview); September 20, 2009 (official) – October 11, 2009	In the Daylight	Charlotte Fontaine	
June 30, 2010 – July 25, 2010	Love, Loss, and What I Wore		also performed in San Jose, Cal. during 2013
April 6, 2011 (previews); April 16, 2011 (official) – May 29, 2011	Reading Under the Influence	Kerry	

=== Television ===
Date First Aired	Name	Episode	Role	Network or Production Company
October 23, 2008	Ugly Betty	"Granny Pants" (season 3, episode 5)	Harmony	ABC
January 19, 2009	Electric Company	3 seasons, 52 episodes	Francine Carruthers	Children's Television Workshop (PBS)
May 7, 2010	Gravity	One Cold Swim Away (season 1, episode 3)	Naomi	Starz
November 16, 2010	The Good Wife	Bad Girls (season 2, episode 7)	Corey Lutz	CBS
August 28, 2011	I Just Want My Pants Back	pilot	Jocoby	MTV
November 10, 2011	The Big Bang Theory	The Ornithophobia Diffusion (season 5, episode 9)	Laura	CBS
March 25, 2012	Desperate Housewives	Any Moment (season 8, episode 18)	Mary Beth	ABC
February 15, 2013	It Could Be Worse	What's Your Secret? (season 1, episode 3)	Lisa	Four A.M. Productions
March 4, 2013	Gracious Café	Detox (season 1, episode 3)	Ansley	
November 10, 2013	Think Tank	Job Creation (episode 1); Panda Copulation (episode 3); Prostitution (episode 4)	Hannah	A&E (web site)
March 5, 2017	Time After Time	pilot		ABC
January 26, 2018	High Maintenance	Fagan (season 2, episode 2)	Carrie	HBO
January 28, 2018	Divorce	Worth It (season 2, episode 3)		HBO
April 10, 2018	The Last O.G.	Bobo Beans (season 1, episode 2)	Maggie	TBS
October 4, 2018	Murphy Brown	I (Don't) Heart Huckabee (season 11, episode 2)	Addie Abrams	CBS
October 14, 2019	The Deuce	This Trust Thing (season 3, episode 6)	Cheryl	HBO
