= Even in My Dreams =

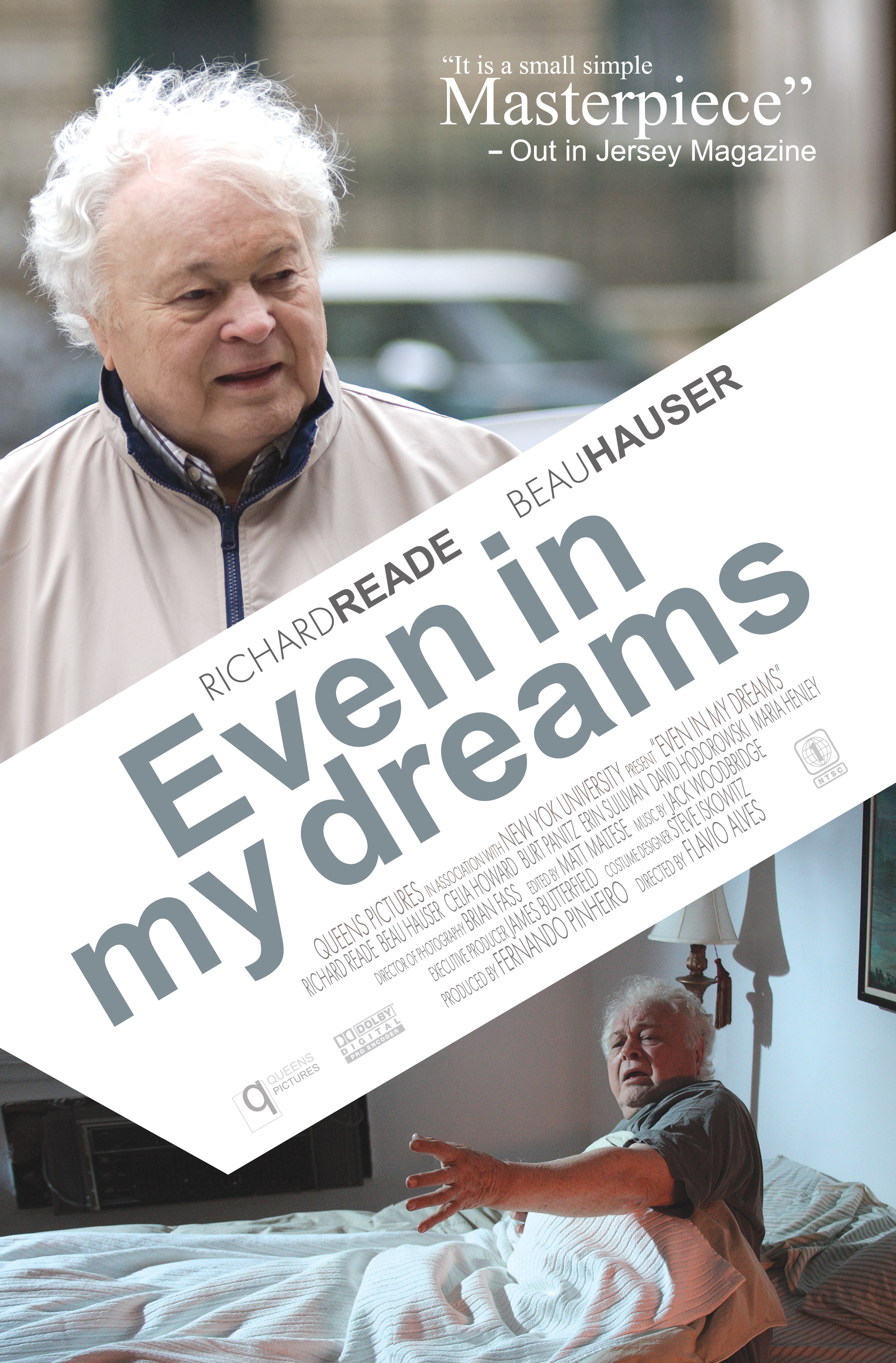
- theatrical poster
- Directed by: Flavio Alves
- Produced by: Fernando Pinheiro
- Starring: Richard Reade; Beau Hauser
- Cinematography: Brian Fass
- Edited by: Matt Maltese
- Music by: Jack Woodbridge
- Release date: 2008
- Running time: 8 minutes
- Countries: United States; Brazil
- Languages: English; Portuguese

Even in My Dreams is a 2008 short film written and directed by Flavio Alves, starring Richard Reade as the main character, Michael. Considering its shoestring budget, Even in My Dreams was a huge success, getting screened at a variety of film festivals all over the world.

Even My Dreams was filmed in New York City, in the spring of 2008. It debuted at the Vermont International Film Festival and received from NYU the Technisphere Award for best student film. Even in My Dreams was also the winner of the Golden Palm Award at the 2009 Mexico International Film Festival, and the Golden Ace Award at the 2009 Las Vegas Film Festival. In June 2010, Even in My Dreams was acquired for worldwide distribution by Indie Media Entertainment.
