= Alex Lora Cercos =

Spanish film director

Alex Lora
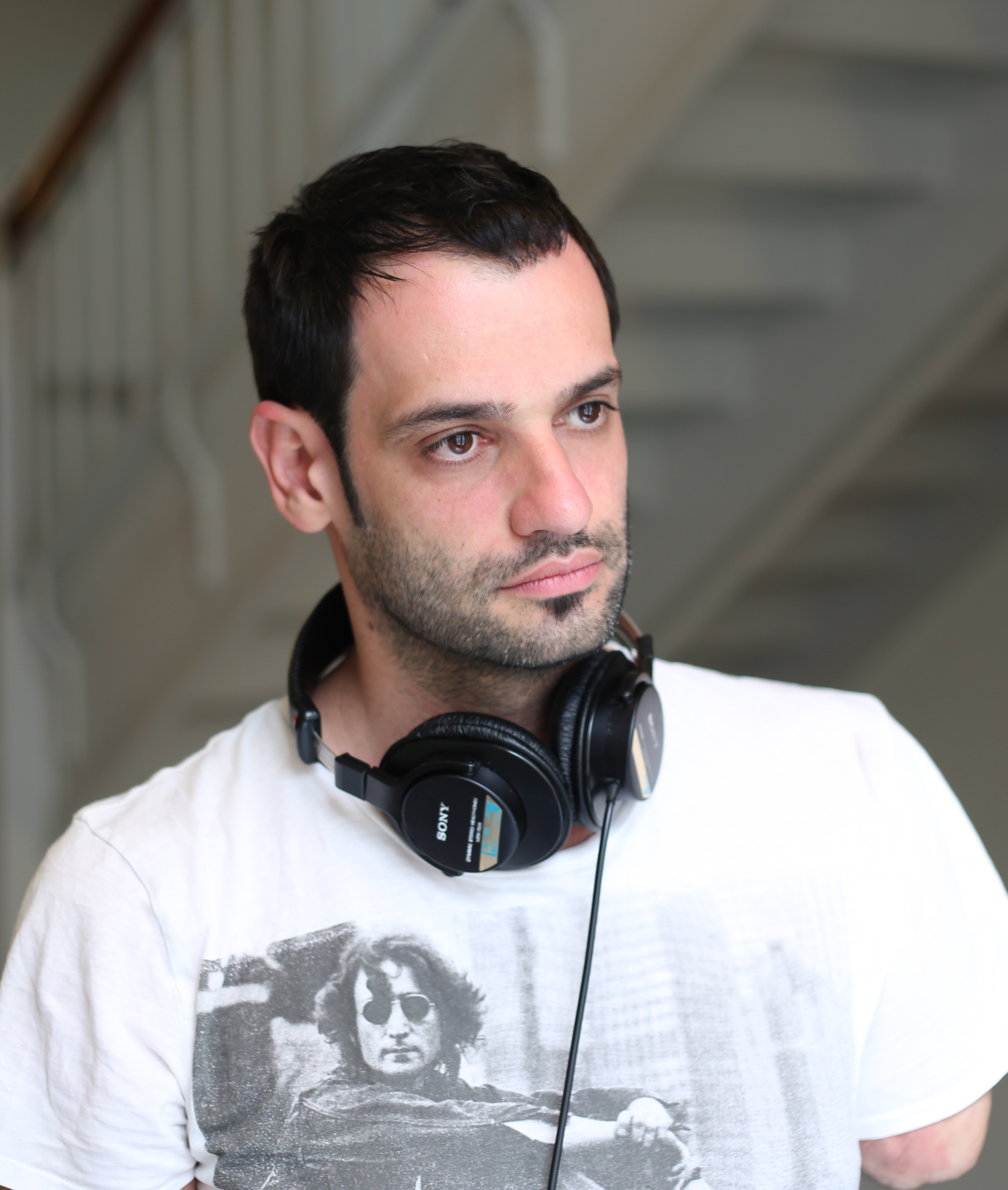
- Alex Lora at the New York Emmy Awards, New York, 2022
- Born: Àlex Lora Cercós; September 19, 1979 (age 47); Barcelona, Spain
- Occupation: Film director
- Years active: 2004-present
- Website: alexlora.com

Àlex Lora Cercós (born September 19, 1979), better known as Alex Lora, is a Spanish film director. His films, marked by complex narratives, tackle social issues and have entered hundreds of film festivals and received multiple awards and nominations around the world, most notably the three official selections at Sundance, the nomination to the Student Academy Awards, his presence at the Berlinale Talent Campus, the 2 awards of the Gaudí Catalan Academy Awards after 4 other nominations, a nomination for the Goya Academy Awards, and the nomination and the prize at the New York Emmy Awards.

== Early years ==
Alex Lora was born in Barcelona, Spain and started making film in very young age after his parents bought a video8 handycam. Mr. Lora is a graduate of Barcelona's Ramon Llull University, where he earned BA and MA degrees in filmmaking and writing and directing for fiction.

During this period, he collaborated with Xavi Satorra on two documentaries: “Seria Buenos Aires” exploring the effects of the 2001 crisis in Argentina, and “Peace Camp”, for the Catalan TV, about a group of kids from Israel, Palestine, Iran and Spain, meeting up at the Forum 2004.

In 2007, he takes part of the Berlinale Talent Campus, and directs several short films. One of them, “(En)terrados”, received a nomination at the Gaudi Awards (Spain) in 2010.

== Career ==
In 2011, as a Fulbright Scholar, he completed his two-year MFA in Media Arts Production program at City College of New York, mentored by Chantal Akerman, where he was a final nominee for the Student Academy Award. Since his graduation, he has worked internationally as script analyst, editor, cinematographer, writer and director. His short film, Odysseus' Gambit, about Saravuth Inn, screened at the Sundance Film Festival in 2012, was nominated to the prestigious Gaudi Awards (Spain) in 2012.

His short film "Only Solomon Lee" (2013), was selected in the prestigious Sitges Film Festival.

In 2014, Alex co-directs the short film “Godka Cirka", a hole in the sky, about the female genital mutilation in Somalia, produced by Alex Kruz premiering at Sundance. After a long festival run, it wins the Gaudí Awards.

His next short film “Parivara”, co-directed with Alex Kruz premiered at Cambridge Film Festival in 2016 and wins best documentary in several countries including the International Film Festival of New York

Alex's feature documentary debut “Thy Father’s Chair” premiered at IDFA, followed by international Film Festival run. It opened theatrically in the US in 2017 and was recognized by The New York Times as a Critics' pick of the month.

His second feature documentary was "The Fourth Kingdom" (2018), received support from the International Documentary Association (IDA) and the Sundance Documentary Fund. It narrates the story of immigrants and underdogs in “Sure We Can '' a recycle center in New York. It screened at various film festivals such as DOC NYC, Shanghai International Film Festival, Festival de Málaga and Documenta Madrid or PNR. The documentary won several awards, including the 2020 Gaudí for Best Documentary.

In 2020, Alex co-wrote, edited, and co-produced the documentary "Savage Land", which was distributed by PBS in the United States.

“We Are Living Things” directed by Antonio Tibaldi, was the first narrative feature film written by Alex Lora, based on his short film “Only Solomon Lee” and “The Fourth Kingdom”. The film, starred by Jorge Antonio Guerrero and Xingchen Lyu, tells the story of two illegal aliens in New York who find each other. It premiered at Slamdance Film Festival in the US and in the Deauville Film Festival in Europe. And opened theatrically in the US in August 2022. The New York Times notes in its review that “writer Alex Lora does much with little”.

"Unicorns" was Alex's narrative feature debut as director. It premiered at the Malaga Film Festival and opened theatrically in Spain in July 2023. The film received 16 Berlanga Awards. According to a Variety review, the film highlights Alex's talents in addressing societal angst through themes of sex, drugs, and instagram post. Cinemania describes "Unicorns" as an interesting, skillful, and insightful exploration of contemporary challenges.

Àlex Lora-Cercós is a recipient of 7 Emmy for his work as a director, producer and editor during the last 10 years at the CUNY TV Show "Nueva York” at the New York Emmy Awards.

Alex's latest short film, "The Masterpiece", won the short-film jury award at the 2025 Sundance Film Festival. "The Masterpiece" also won best short film at the 2025 Goya Awards.
