= Alex Kruz =

American public figure

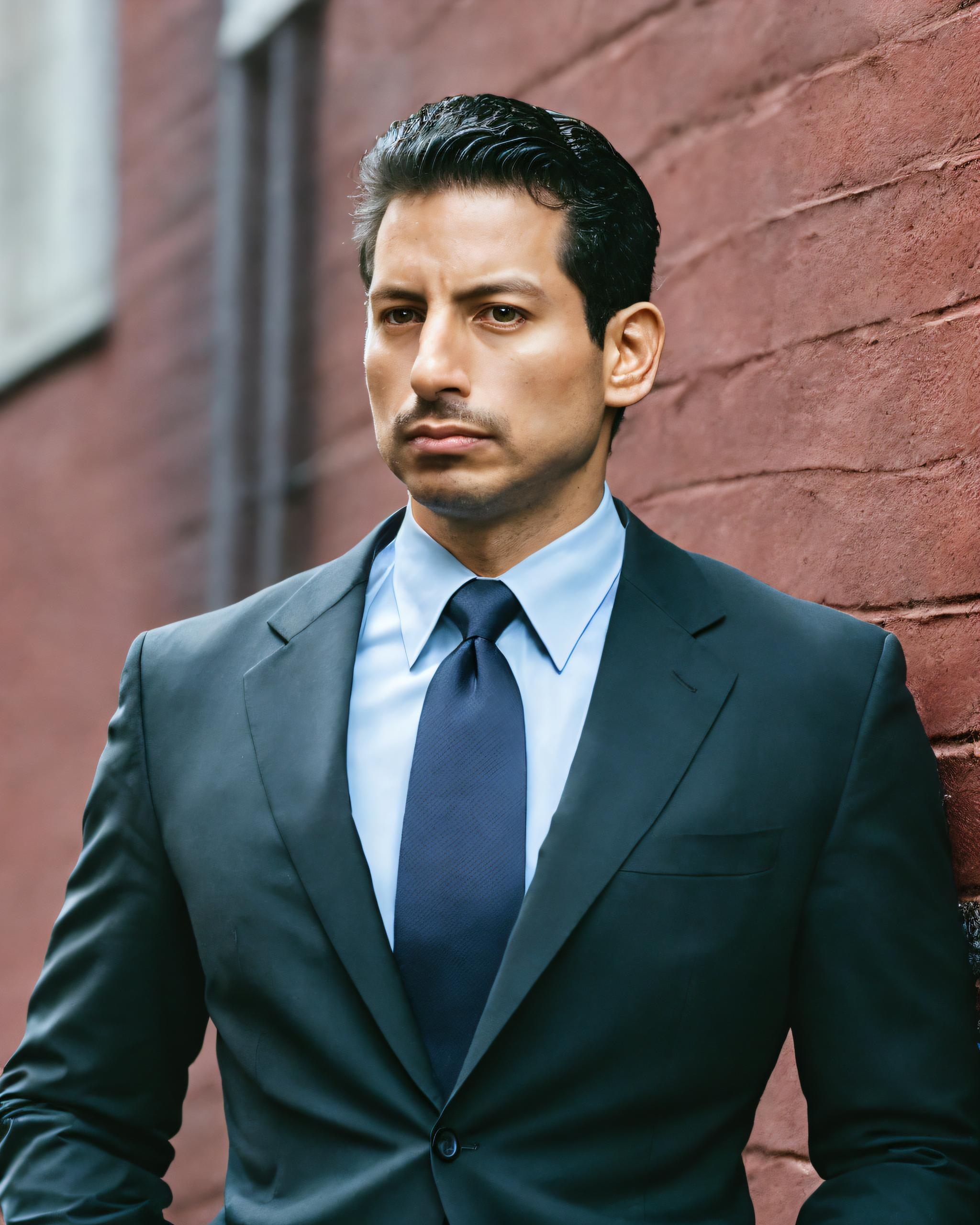
- Alex K. Rojas / Alex Kruz - London, UK 2023
- Born: Alex K. Rojas; November 30, 1975 (age 50); Jersey City, New Jersey
- Education: Rutgers University
- Occupations: Scientist, film director, producer, screenwriter, actor
- Years active: 2011–present
- Notable work: The Garden Left Behind, "Parivara", "Fallen: The Search of a Broken Angel', Tom in America

Alex Kruz, aka Alex K. Rojas (born November 30, 1975) is an American public figure, director, producer, scientist, television, theater and film actor.

== Early life ==
Alex Kruz was born in New Jersey. He is of Ecuadorian descent. He claims a Ph.D. in Quantum engineering and received letters of appreciation from the White House and President Joe Biden. He has been inducted into the Marquis Who's Who registry for the year 2023.

== Career ==
As an actor, Kruz played the role of a bad boyfriend in various TV shows and films. He worked opposite Bruce Willis in theatrical production at the Creative Artist Agency before retirement. He played the Zorro character for Zorro Productions. He took over as Zorro from Antonio Banderas for live shows in Los Angeles. Kruz had his projects on the Academy Award Shortlist 3 times and at Sundance and SXSW 2 times.

In 2014, Kruz produced the short film Godka Cirka (A Hole in the Sky), about the female genital mutilation in Somalia, directed by Alex Lora Cercos which premiered at Sundance. It won the Gaudí Awards.

In 2016, he co-directed the short film Parivara with Alex Lora Cercos. It premiered at the Cambridge Film Festival and won Best Documentary at several international film festivals, including the International Film Festival of New York.

Kruz directed Parivara and Fallen: The Search of a Broken Angel. He received a nomination and won an award at the New York Emmy Awards alongside Alex Lora Cercos.

Kruz is involved in global charitable work, focusing on children's welfare and combating human trafficking. He helped found the Samarpan Foundation (“Unconditional Service” in Sanskrit), a Nepal-based NGO, operating as a 501(c) organization.

== Recognition ==
- Alex Kruz was listed by New York Banner Magazine in the top 50 Native American Actors in film, television, and theater.
- Alex Kruz was interviewed at the Athens International Monthly Art Film Festival.
- The film Parivara, co-written and directed by Alex Lora and Alex Kruz, won the "Best Documentary" award at the New York International Film Festival (IFFNY).
- An interview featuring Alex Kruz, the director, and Ewa Pirog, the producer, of Fallen: The Search of a Broken Angel took place at the Rome Prisma Independent Film Awards.
- In an award interview with Florence Film Awards, Kruz discussed receiving the Congressional Award for Humanitarianism in 2018 and his Emmy Nominations in the same year, along with a subsequent win in 2021 with his long term collaborator, Alex Lora Cercos.
- Kruz was interviewed at MADFA (Madrid International Movie Awards) in Spanish about his film Fallen: The Search of a Broken Angel.
