= Flavio Alves =

Brazilian film producer, director, and screenwriter (born 1969)

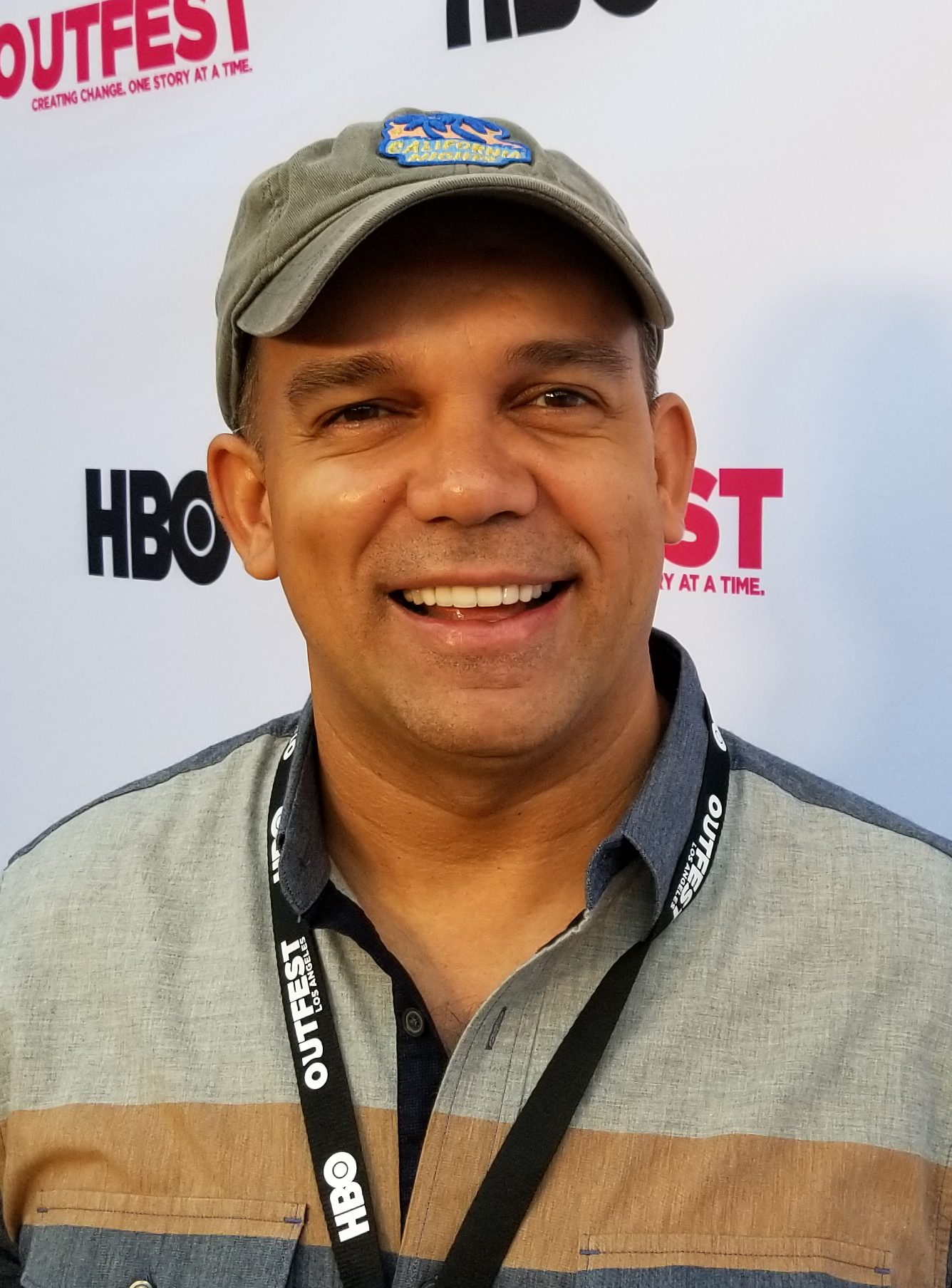
- Flavio Alves at Outfest 2019
- Born: Flavio Pimenta Alves; November 30, 1969 (age 56); Rio de Janeiro, Brazil
- Citizenship: Brazil; United States
- Education: Columbia University; New York University
- Occupations: Film director, producer, screenwriter
- Years active: 2007-present
- Notable work: The Garden Left Behind
- Political party: Democratic
- Spouse: Randall Martusis (m. 2008; died 2015)

Flavio Pimenta Alves (born in Rio de Janeiro, 30 November 1969) is a Brazilian writer, screenwriter, and film director resident in America since 1998. His movies consistently feature elderly characters as protagonists. He is best known for the film The Garden Left Behind starring Michael Madsen, Ed Asner and Carlie Guevara.

== Early years ==
Alves was born in Rio de Janeiro, Brazil and served the Brazilian navy for several years before coming to America in 1997. He was granted political asylum in the United States in 1998 based on political opinion and sexual orientation after he wrote the book, Toque de Silêncio ("Call to Silence", 1997), describing the history of gays and lesbians serving in the Brazilian military. His request was granted because, according to Alves, he received death threats upon publishing his book. Although various human rights organizations, LGBT activists, and former São Paulo mayor Marta Suplicy supported his claim, it has also divided the Brazilian gay community. He attended Columbia University in New York City, where he earned an undergraduate degree in political science in 2007. In the early 2000s he worked as an assistant for then-Congressman Anthony Weiner (D-NY) and then-New York Senator Hillary Clinton (D-NY).

== Career ==
In 2007, Alves left politics and enrolled at New York University to study film production. While there he wrote and directed, Even in My Dreams, which received the Technisphere Award from NYU for best student film, and was screened at a variety of film festivals around the world. The film was also the winner of the Golden Palm Award at the 2009 Mexico International Film Festival, and the Golden Ace Award at the 2009 Las Vegas International Film Festival. In June 2010, Flavio released his short film The Secret Friend, starring Viola Harris and Siobhan Fallon in the major roles. The film received multiple awards and nominations after its premiere at the Palm Springs International Film Festival in 2010, where it was chosen as Best of the Fest. Alves also directed the award-winning short film, Tom in America (2014), starring Academy Award nominees, Burt Young and Sally Kirkland, has been screened at over 140 film festivals worldwide, and was also featured on the cable network Here TV.

Flavio's most recent film, The Garden Left Behind, is his first feature-length project and stars Michael Madsen and Ed Asner. The film was well received in the media, and was widely praised for having a strong trans representation in front of and behind the camera, including the lead, Carlie Guevara. The Garden Left Behind premiered at SXSW Film Festival in 2019, where it won the Audience Award. Caryn James/The Hollywood Reporter wrote, "It's one thing to decide to make a movie about the struggles of the transgender community and violent attacks on it. But it's far harder to turn that message into a film as natural and graceful as The Garden Left Behind. Directed by Flavio Alves, a producer making his first feature, this is a clear-eyed, poignant yet unsentimental drama about Tina, a trans woman and undocumented Mexican living in New York." Randy Myers/San Jose Mercury News raved: "The Garden Left Behind" will break your heart; a film of utter grace, poignancy and deep understanding." And Rotten Tomatoes listed The Garden Left Behind as No. 39 in their 200 Best LGBTQ Movies of All Time editorial and stated the Critics Consensus was: "The Garden Left Behind draws on one immigrant's journey to offer graceful, thought-provoking commentary on timely sociopolitical themes."

In 2018, Alves was selected by the Film Society of Lincoln Center to the Artist Academy. The program is designed to support the next generation of filmmakers from a variety of backgrounds as they develop their careers and build audiences within the film community.

In 2019, Flavio was selected to Ryan Murphy's HALF Initiative Directing Program, aimed at creating equal opportunities for minorities behind the camera.

And, in 2020, The National Association of Latino Independent Producers (NALIP) honored Alves with the Best Latinx Director Award for his debut feature The Garden Left Behind.

In 2022, Alves announced that he and his production company relocated to Florida to research and produce his new film.

== Ebay campaign ==
While in pre-production for his upcoming film, The Garden Left Behind, Alves and his team pioneered the use of eBay as a crowdfunding platform, where they raised more than $100,000. The unprecedented success experienced during this campaign revamped typical crowdfunding methods. The film became the first independent film to be funded substantially through donations and sales via eBay.

== Personal life ==
Flavio lives in The Villages. In April 2010, Alves became a US citizen. As of 2013, he has been a member of the National Board of Review.

== Filmography ==
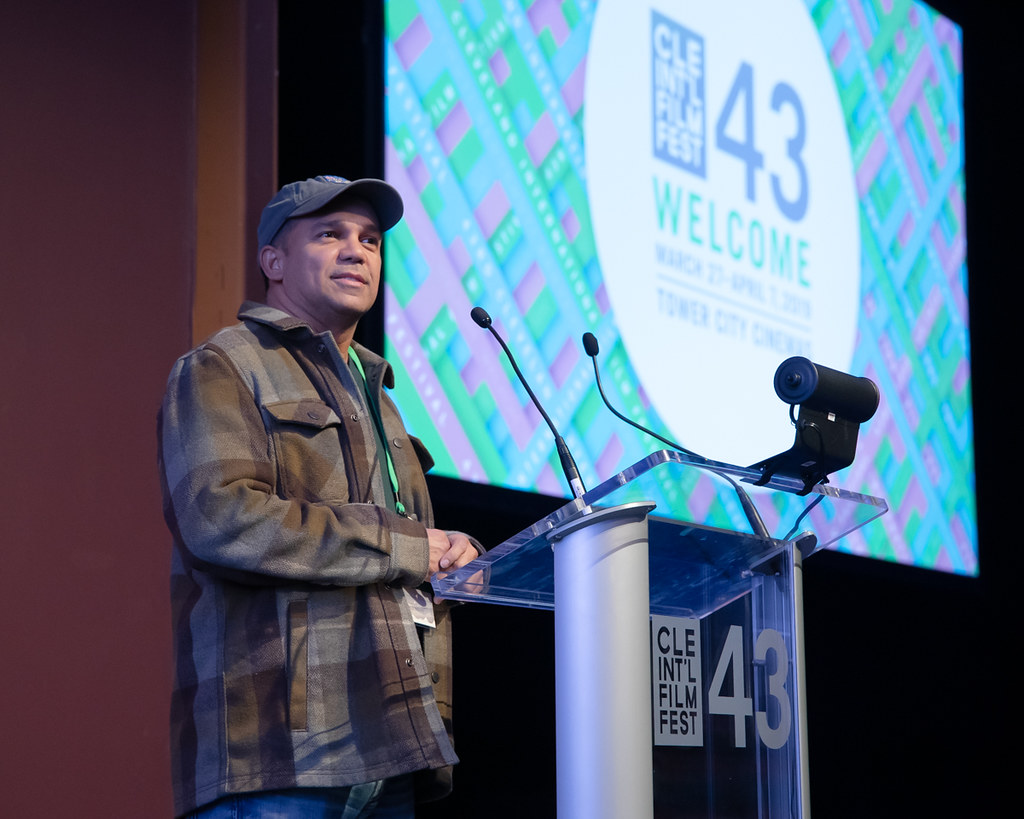
Flavio Alves at Cleveland International Film Festival, March 29, 2019.

Year	Title	Director	Producer	Screenwriter	Notes
2019	The Garden Left Behind	Yes	No	Yes	Feature film
2014	Tom in America	Yes	Yes	No	Short film
2013	Only Solomon Lee	No	Yes	No	Short film
2012	Art Machine	No	Yes	No	Feature film
2012	The Perfect Wedding	No	Yes	No	Feature film
2011	Odysseus' Gambit	No	Yes	No	Short documentary
2010	The Secret Friend	Yes	Yes	Yes	Short film
2010	The Position	No	Yes	No	Short film
2008	Even in My Dreams	Yes	Yes	Yes	

== Accolades ==
- 2021 Jerome Hill Artist Fellowship – Jerome Foundation
- 2020 Best Latinx Director Award – National Association of Latino Independent Producers (NALIP) (The Garden Left Behind)
- 2019 Directing Mentorship – HALF Initiative, Ryan Murphy
- 2019 QueerScope Debut Film Award – Hamburg LGBT Film Festival (The Garden Left Behind)
- 2019 Audience Award – SXSW Film Festival (The Garden Left Behind)
- 2018 Artist Academy fellow – Film Society of Lincoln Center
- 2017 Video and Digital Production Grants – Jerome Foundation (The Garden Left Behind)
- 2017 IFP Lab fellow – Independent Filmmaker Project: ifp (The Garden Left Behind)
- 2016 NYSCA Grant – New York State Council on the Arts (The Garden Left Behind)
- 2015 The American Film Award (Tom in America)
- 2013 Student Grant – National Board of Review (Tom in America)
- 2011 Jury Award – Jornada Internacional de Cinema da Bahial (The Secret Friend)
- 2011 Audience Award – Indianapolis International Film Festival (The Secret Friend)
- 2011 Jury Award – Las Vegas International Film Festival (The Secret Friend)
- 2011 Grand Jury Prize – Amsterdam Film Festival (The Secret Friend)
- 2011 Jury Award – Cleveland International Film Festival (The Secret Friend)
- 2011 Special Jury Award – Canada International Film Festival (The Secret Friend)
- 2010 Cine Golden Eagle Award for Best Short Film – CINE (The Secret Friend)
- 2010 Special Jury Award – Savannah Film Festival (The Secret Friend)
- 2010 Best of the Fest – Palm Springs International Film Festival (The Secret Friend)
- 2009 Golden Palm Award – Mexico International Film Festival (Even in My Dreams)
- 2009 Golden Ace Award – Las Vegas Film Festival (Even in My Dreams)
- 2008 Audience Award – Festival Internacional de Cinema de Itu (Even in My Dreams)
- 2008 Technisphere Award for Best Student Film – New York University (Even in My Dreams)
