= List of independent short films =

This is a list of notable independent short films. A short film refers to a film that is generally anywhere under 1 hour in length.

== List of notable independent short films ==
=== 2020s ===
Film	Year	Director(s)	Writer(s)	Producers(s)
A Crime Across Four Landscapes	2026	Aidan Weaver	Aidan Weaver, William Christopher Stephens	Katie Sanderson, Aidan Weaver
Fireflies in the Dusk	2025	Jonathan Hammond	Jonathan Hammond, Ryan Roach	Martin Spanjers
Johanne Sacreblu	2025	Camila Aurora González, Gladys L. Grantt	Camila Aurora González	Camila Aurora González
Out for Delivery	2025	Chelsea Christer	Chelsea Christer	Clinton Trucks, Alexa Rocero, David B. Lyons
Ade (On a Sunday)	2024	Theja Rio	Theja Rio	Theja Rio, Dan Pusa, Nancy Nisa Beso
Are You Scared to Be Yourself Because You Think That You Might Fail?	2024	Bec Pecaut	Bec Pecaut	Emily Harris
Cura sana	2024	Lucía G. Romero	Lucía G. Romero	Ruth Porro Gisbert, Borja Nández
Deck 5B	2024	Malin Ingrid Johansson	Malin Ingrid Johansson	Andrea Gyllenskiöld, Adam Holmström, Joel Rostmark
One Day This Kid	2024	Alexander Farah	Alexander Farah	Joaquin Cardoner
Tea	2024	Blake Winston Rice	Blake Winston Rice	Gabriella Piazza, Michael Cejovic, Blake Winston Rice
The Vanishing of S.S. Willie	2024	Nick Lives	Nick Lives	Nick Lives
A Lien	2023	David Cutler-Kreutz, Sam Cutler-Kreutz	David Cutler-Kreutz, Sam Cutler-Kreutz	Tara Sheffer, Rebecca Eskreis, Sam Cutler-Kreutz, David Cutler-Kreutz
The Last Butterflies	2023	Patrick Rea	Whitney Wegman-Wood	Cooper Andrews, Jake Jackson, Whitney Wegman-Wood, John Wood
The Big Pelvis	2023	Joseph Jeavons	Joseph Jeavons, Owen Swift	Joseph Jeavons
The One Note Man	2023	George Siougas	George Siougas	George Siougas, Luke Carroll, Michael Stevenson
Red, White and Blue	2023	Nazrin Choudhury	Nazrin Choudhury	Nazrin Choudhury, Sara McFarlane, Samantha Bee
Cherries	2022	Vytautas Katkus	Vytautas Katkus	Marija Razgutė, Brigita Beniušytė
How Not to Date While Trans	2022	Nyala Moon	Nyala Moon	Eileen Makak, Chien-Yu Wang
Parasocial	2022	Joseph Jeavons	Joseph Jeavons, Owen Swift, Bala Brown	Joseph Jeavons
Touch	2022	Justin Burquist	Justin Burquist	Evette Betancourt, Christopher Holloway
A Rodeo Film	2021	Darius Dawson	Darius Dawson	Ryan Binse
Burros	2021	Jefferson Stein	Jefferson Stein	Liz Cardenas, Russell Sheaffer, Jefferson Stein, Douglas Riggs
Don't Go Tellin' Your Momma	2021	Topaz Jones, Simon Davis, Jason Sondock	Topaz Jones, Simon Davis, Jason Sondock	Julien Berlan, Patrick Milling Smith
Leylak	2021	Scott Aharoni, Dennis Latos	Mustafa Kaymak	Scott Aharoni, Mustafa Kaymak, Dennis Latos
Libertyville	2021	Devin Scott	Suzana Norberg	Robert Norberg, Suzana Norberg, Wally Schlotter, Jeanne Scott
Pulp Friction	2021	Mark Atkinson, Tony Olmos	Mark Atkinson	Mark Atkinson
We All Die Alone	2021	Jonathan Hammond	Jonathan Hammond, Ryan Roach	Ryan Binse, Jonathan Hammond, Carla Nell, Yasmin Preciado, Shannon Taylor
Dirty	2020	Matthew Puccini	Matthew Puccini	Cecilia Delgado, Matthew Puccini, Jeremy Truong
Laura Hasn't Slept	2020	Parker Finn	Parker Finn	Jessica Bonander, Tristan Borys, Sean Dacanay, Jonathan Fass, Parker Finn, Lew Temple
Leave 'em Laughing	2020	Chris Cashman	Chris Cashman, Carlo Coppo, Christopher Lusti	Mark Atkinson, Dave Branfman, Chris Cashman, Carlo Coppo, Christopher Lusti, Annie Willett
Taar	2020	Pankaj Sonawane	Pankaj Sonawane	Sandeep Patil, Abhijeet Mhetre, Namita Gogate
The Power Agent	2020	Mark Atkinson	Mark Atkinson	Mark Atkinson
Things We Dig	2020	Pia Thrasher	Pia Thrasher	Courtney Eastman, Jeremy Katz, Stephen Mickelsen, Miguel Rodriguez, J.R. Thrasher, Pia Thrasher

=== 2010s ===
Film	Year	Director(s)	Writer(s)	Producers(s)
Balloon	2019	Jeremy Merrifield	Jeremy Merrifield, Dave Testa	Christina Cha
The Critic	2019	Stella Velon	Stella Velon	Jean Gabriel Kauss, Stella Velon
Feeling Through	2019	Doug Roland	Doug Roland	Doug Roland, Luis Augusto Figueroa, Phil Newsom, Sue Ruzenski
The Flourish	2019	Shannon Taylor	Brit Taylor, Anthony Maze	Anthony Maze, Shannon Taylor
Lavender	2019	Matthew Puccini	Matthew Puccini	Casey Bader, Corey Deckler, Tyler Rabinowitz
Miller & Son	2019	Asher Jelinsky	Asher Jelinsky	Kate Chamuris
The Neighbors' Window	2019	Marshall Curry	Marshall Curry	Marshall Curry, Jonathan Olson, Julia Kennelly, Elizabeth Martin
Rendezvous	2019	Seth Kozak, Damian Veilleux	Seth Kozak	Seth Kozak, Bob Kovacs
What Daphne Saw	2019	Lizz Marshall	Lizz Marshall	Marine Delorme, Lizz Marshall, Cory Russell, Alex Winkler
The Color of Me	2018	Sreejith nair	Sreejith Nair, Fahima Mohamood	Rohit Gupta, Sreejith Nair
Daisy Belle	2018	William Wall	William Wall	Caroline Amiguet, Ginger Holland, Beryl Huang, Jean-Francois Cavelier, Marisa Kapavik, Matt Sivertson, Edward Wall, Kimberly Wall
The Dark Resurgence: A Star Wars Story	2018	Michael McCumber	Michael McCumber	Michael McCumber
Deviant	2018	Benjamin Howard	Benjamin Howard, James Hall	Brian DeGour, Benjamin Howard, Ricardo Osuna, Wally Schlotter, Rich Underwood
The Fifth of November	2018	Javier Augusto Nunez	Qurrat Ann Kadwani, Javier Augusto Nunez	Christopher Holloway, Qurrat Ann Kadwani, Javier Augusto Nunez
Assumption	2017	Anthony Leone	Anthony Leone	Luke Pensabene
Mum	2017	Akash Mihani	Jackie R Bala	Akash Mihani
My Nephew Emmett	2017	Kevin Wilson Jr.	Kevin Wilson Jr.	Lauren L. Owen, Kevin Wilson Jr.
Once Guilty, Now Innocent, Still Dead	2017	Mark Vizcarra	Mark Vizcarra	Mark Vizcarra
The Silent Child	2017	Chris Overton	Rachel Shenton	Rachel Shenton, Chris Overton, Rebecca Harris, Julie Foy
12 Kilometers	2016	Mike Pecci	Mike Pecci	Mike Pecci
Bardo	2016	Scott Aharoni, Dennis Latos	Petros Georgiadis	Scott Aharoni, Dennis Latos
Facing the Wall	2016	Aalam-Warqe Davidian	Aalam-Warqe Davidian	Naomi Levari, Saar Yogev
Fletcher and Jenks	2016	Tony Olmos	Jordan Jacobo	Ryan Binse, Jodi Cilley, Tony Gorodeckas, George Jac, Allie Lennox, Kelly Potts
Hush	2016	Michael Lewis Foster	Michael Lewis Foster	Eric Casalini, Michael Lewis Foster, Ghadir Mounib
Nocturne in Black	2016	Jimmy Keyrouz	Jimmy Keyrouz	Marc Fadel, Ellie Foumbi, Felecia Hunter, Jimmy Keyrouz
Our Barrio	2016	Ryan Casselman	Ryan Casselman, Yvette Angulo	Ryan Casselman, Yvette Angulo
The Phantom Hour	2016	Brian Patrick Butler	Brian Patrick Butler	Brian Patrick Butler, Luke Pensabene
Red	2016	Branko Tomovic	Branko Tomovic, Paul D. Clancy	Adrian Carswell, Branko Tomovic, Dina Vickermann, Khaled Kaissar, Tobias Huber
Thunder Road	2016	Jim Cummings	Jim Cummings	Mark Vashro
Undocumented	2016	Chris Cashman	Chris Cashman, Michael Pancer	Chris Cashman, Enrique Morones, Michael Pancer, Guadalupe Valencia, Riley Wood
Reformation	2015	Hoyon Jung	Hoyon Jung	Joshua Fulton
Adventures of Malia	2015	Shubhavi Arya	Shubhavi Arya	Shubhavi Arya
Prego	2015	Usher Morgan	Usher Morgan	Usher Morgan
Baari	2015	Jatinder Preet	Balram	Iqbal Lahar
Everything Will Be Okay	2015	Patrick Vollrath	Patrick Vollrath	Patrick Vollrath
Boudoir	2014	Gina Lee Ronhovde	Gina Lee Ronhovde	Angela Barrett, Josh Eisenstadt
The Case of Evil	2014	Jana Hallford, Neal Hallford	Jana Hallford, Neal Hallford	Jana Hallford, Neal Hallford
The Gunfighter	2014	Eric Kissack	Kevin Tenglin	Christopher Northup, Sarah Platt
Stark Electric Jesus	2014	Hyash Tanmoy, Mrigankasekhar Ganguly	Hyash Tanmoy, Mrigankasekhar Ganguly	Hyash Tanmoy, Arindam Biswas
Tom in America	2014	Flavio Alves	Jeffrey Solomon, Scott Alexander Hess, Flavio Alves	Roy Gokay Wol, Greg Starr
The A.R.K. Report	2013	Shmuel Hoffman	Asher Crispe, Harry Moskoff, Layla O'Shea	Harry Moskoff
Alfie	2013	Thomas Mathai	Thomas Mathai	Thomas Mathai, Sreeraj Nadarajan
An Obsolete Altar	2013	Hyash Tanmoy, Mrigankasekhar Ganguly	Hyash Tanmoy, Mrigankasekhar Ganguly	Hyash Tanmoy
I Love Her	2013	Darya Perelay	Darya Perelay	Darya Perelay
Naked	2013	Sean Robinson	VP Boyle	VP Boyle, Becky Froman
The Puritans	2013	Sean Robinson	Sean Robinson	Paul Warner, Martina Rojas Chaigneau
Whiplash	2013	Damien Chazelle	Damien Chazelle	Jason Blum, Nicholas Britell, Helen Estabrook
Ninety Seconds	2012	Gerard Lough	Gerard Lough	Gerard Lough, Michael Parle
Curfew	2012	Shawn Christensen	Shawn Christensen	Damon Russell, Mara Kassin, Andrew Napier
Shabbat Dinner	2012	Michael Morgenstern	Michael Morgenstern	Eleni
Witness 11	2012	Sean Mitchell	Sean Mitchell	Helen Jang Mitchell, Sean Mitchell
The Strange Thing About the Johnsons	2011	Ari Aster	Ari Aster	Alejandro De Leon
I'm Here	2010	Spike Jonze	Spike Jonze	Vincent Landay
The Heiress Lethal	2010	Michael Brueggemeyer	Marianne Bates	Tony Mingee
Sleeping with Charlie Kaufman	2010	J Roland Kelly	J Roland Kelly	Xtranormal Osipa Media

=== 2000s ===
Film	Year	Director(s)	Writer(s)	Producers(s)
Amanecer	2009	Alvaro D. Ruiz	Alvaro D. Ruiz	Luci Temple, Janet Duncan
The Butterfly Circus	2009	Joshua Weigel	Joshua Weigel, Rebekah Weigel	Angie Alvarez, Joshua Weigel, Rebekah Weigel
No Through Road (web series)	2009	Steven Chamberlain	Steven Chamberlain	Indrancole3
The Old Man and the Seymour	2009	Giancarlo Fiorentini, Jonathan Grimm	Giancarlo Fiorentini, Jonathan Grimm	Giancarlo Fiorentini, Jonathan Grimm, Kevin Hill
Saber	2009	Adam Green	Adam Green	Clare Grant, Rileah Vanderbilt
Shrove Tuesday: The Legend of Pancake Marion	2009	Lee Andrew Matthews	Lee Andrew Matthews	Lee Andrew Matthews
Mapule's Choice	2008	Kaizer Matsumunyane	Kaizer Matsumunyane	Tumelo Matobako
Veenavaadanam	2008	Sathish Kalathil	Sathish Kalathil	Sathish Kalathil
1000 Year Sleep	2007	Adam Wingard	Adam Wingard E. L. Katz	Adam Wingard
Laura Panic	2007	Adam Wingard	Adam Wingard E. L. Katz	Adam Wingard
The Sons of Eilaboun	2007	Hisham Zreiq	Hisham Zreiq	Hisham Zreiq
Grace (short)	2007	Paul Solet	Paul Solet	Rebecca Perry Cutter
Oculus: Chapter 3 - The Man with the Plan	2006	Mike Flanagan	Mike Flanagan, Jeff Seidman	Sea Cerveny, Amy Winter
Chabiwali Pocket Watch	2006	Vibhu Puri	Vibhu Puri	Film and Television Institute of India
Nicky's Game	2005	John-Luke Montias	Peter Alson	Matthew Parker, Matthew Strauss
Twitch	2005	Leah Meyerhoff	Leah Meyerhoff	Sean Warner
Stand Up for Justice: The Ralph Lazo Story	2004	John Esaki	John Esaki	Amy E. Kato
The Last Farm	2004	Rúnar Rúnarsson	Rúnar Rúnarsson	Þórir Snær Sigurjónsson
Day of Independence	2003	Chris Tashima	Chris Tashima, Tim Toyama	Lisa Onodera
Two Soldiers	2003	Aaron Schneider	Aaron Schneider	Chris Tashima, Tim Toyama, Bob Ducsay, Kate Miller, Betsy Pollock, Andrew J. Sacks, Aaron Schneider
Barrier Device	2002	Grace Lee	Grace Lee	Caroline Libresco, Rosie Wong
The $5 Movie	2001	Devin Scott		Jeanne Scott, Wally Schlotter
Remembrance	2001	Stephanie Morgenstern	Stephanie Morgenstern, Mark Ellis	Paula Fleck
Rejected	2000	Don Hertzfeldt	Don Hertzfeldt	Don Hertzfeldt
A Sense of Entitlement	2000	Mark L. Feinsod	Mark L. Feinsod	Scott J. Kemper
Shooter	2000	Mark Morgenstern	Denis McGrath	Denis McGrath

=== 1990s ===
Film	Year	Director(s)	Writer(s)	Producers(s)
Reflections	1999	Pogus Caesar	Pogus Caesar	Windrush Productions UK
Sleeping Beauties	1999	Jamie Babbit	Jamie Babbit	Andrea Sperling, Victoria Robinson
Me and the Big Guy	1999	Matt Nix	Matt Nix	Matt Nix, Max Stubblefield
Express: Aisle to Glory	1998	Jonathan Buss	Jonathan Buss	Jonathan Buss, Stephen Goldstein, Michael Sarner
Visas and Virtue	1997	Chris Tashima	Chris Tashima, Tom Donaldson	Chris Tashima, Tim Toyama
Cutting Moments	1996	Douglas Buck	Douglas Buck	Douglas Buck
An Eye on X	1995	Pogus Caesar	Pogus Caesar	Pogus Caesar
Multi-Facial	1995	Vin Diesel	Vin Diesel	Vin Diesel
Requiem	1995	Elizabeth Sung	Peter Tulipan	Mel M. Metcalfe III
Denko	1993	Mohamed Camara	Mohamed Camara	Dominique Andreani

=== Pre-1990s ===
Film	Year	Director(s)	Writer(s)	Producers(s)
The Lunch Date	1989	Adam Davidson	Adam Davidson	Garth Stein
Where's Pete	1986	Jim Purdy	Jim Purdy	Michael J. F. Scott
Rally of The Giants	1980	Beryl Armstrong	Beryl Armstrong	Beryl Armstrong
Within the Woods	1978	Sam Raimi	Sam Raimi	Rob Tapert
Lanton Mills	1969	Terrence Malick	Terrence Malick	John Roper
The Secret Cinema	1966	Paul Bartel	Paul Bartel	Paul Bartel, Bob Schulenberg
1:42.08	1966	George Lucas	George Lucas	University of Southern California
Ars	1959	Jacques Demy	Jacques Demy	Jean-Pierre Chartier, Philippe Dussart
