= Dig Comics =

- Directed by: Miguel Cima
- Written by: Miguel Cima
- Produced by: Miguel Cima Corey Blake; Dirk Van Fleet; Chris Brandt; Scott Shaw; Tiina Teal; Miguel Cima, Sr. Gloria Cima
- Narrated by: Miguel Cima
- Cinematography: Brian Crane; Justin Talley
- Edited by: Dirk Van Fleet
- Music by: Rodney McGlothlin; Fernando Romay
- Release dates: July 22, 2009 (Comic Con International Film Festival); July 25, 2009 (United States)
- Running time: 19 minutes
- Country: United States
- Language: English

Dig Comics is an American documentary film written and directed by Miguel Cima. It won an award for Best Documentary at the San Diego Comic-Con International Film Festival, in 2009. The short film advocates for the comic book art form in the United States, and encourages the viewers to read more comic books.

== Synopsis ==
Cima, an avid comic book advocate and filmmaker, embarks on a journey to win fans for this print medium. In doing so, he explains the reasons for the steady loss of readership in the US over the last 60 years, and questions why this originally American art form flourishes more successfully in France, Japan, the Netherlands and Germany.

Cima interviews experts, artists, distributors, fans and nonreaders to provide a wide perspective on the challenges affecting the industry. He conducts random man-on-the-street interviews, as well as talks with comic book enthusiasts, about the relegation of printed comic books to a niche market while big Hollywood films earn billions from comic book spin-offs. The scope of the documentary is broadened with a historic take on the genre. A cross-cultural comparative explores the evolution of comic book readership in countries such as France and Japan, from the last century until the present.

== History ==
Dig Comics was conceived by writer and director Miguel Cima, and shot on location in Los Angeles, California. Further produced clips and videos were also shot in Los Angeles as well as Paris, France.

After the film's release in 2009, it was screened at a number of film festivals. It won the Best Documentary category at the San Diego Comic-Con International Film Festival in 2009.

== Reception ==
Overall the documentary short was received positively. Actor and producer Edward James Olmos expressed support for the film.: Comics Alliance pointed out that high price of comic books in recent years and the increase in media channels competing for consumer dollars are not mentioned as possible factors contributing to the decline in sales.

=== Festivals and showcases ===
- Cannes Independent Film Festival, 2009
- Los Angeles Downtown Film Festival, 2009
- Vancouver, Canada International Film Festival, 2009
- Tucson Film And Music Festival, 2009
- Royal Flush Film Festival New York, 2009
- Cannes American Pavilion Emerging Filmmaker Showcase, 2010
- New Filmmakers LA at Sunset & Gower Film Festival, 2010
- Bumbershoot Film Festival Seattle, 2010
- Shockfest Film Festival of Hollywood, 2010
- Long Island International Film Expo, 2010
- Full Frame Documentary Festival, 2010
- Fear No Film Festival, 2010
- Action On Film International Film Festival, 2010
- Moving Image Film Festival, 2010
