= Anadarko Basin =

Geologic depositional and structural basin in the United States

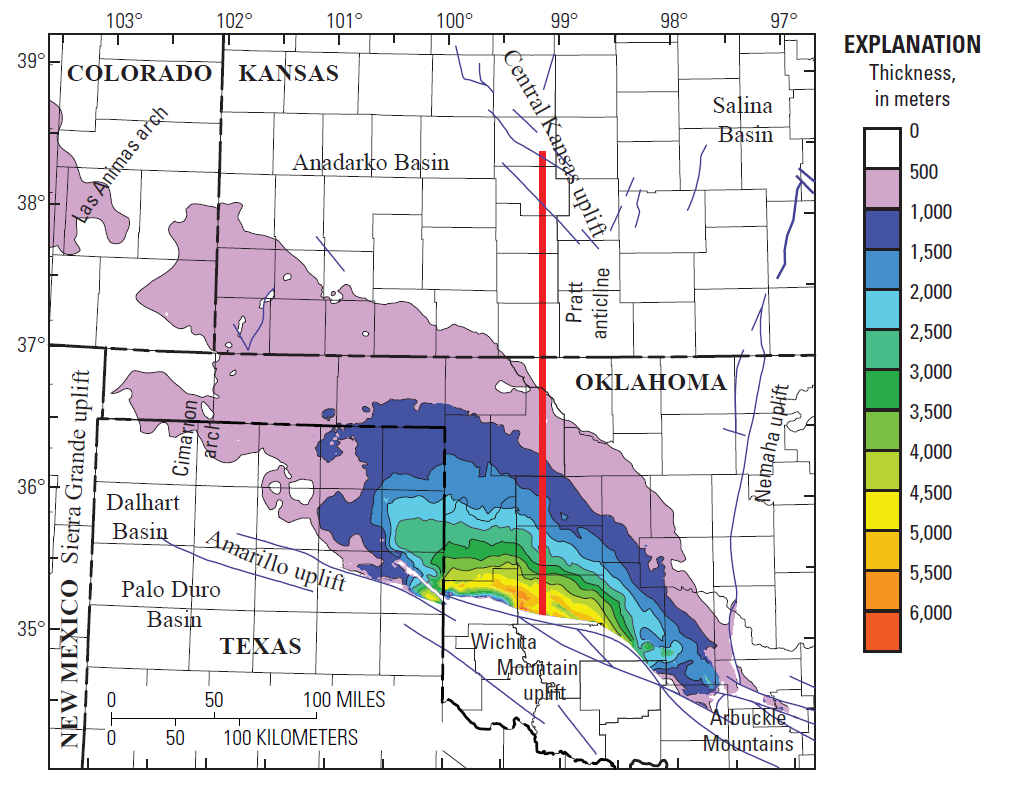
Geological map for the Anadarko Basin showing thickness of strata between the Silurian Hunter Group and the Pennsylvanian Desmoinesian

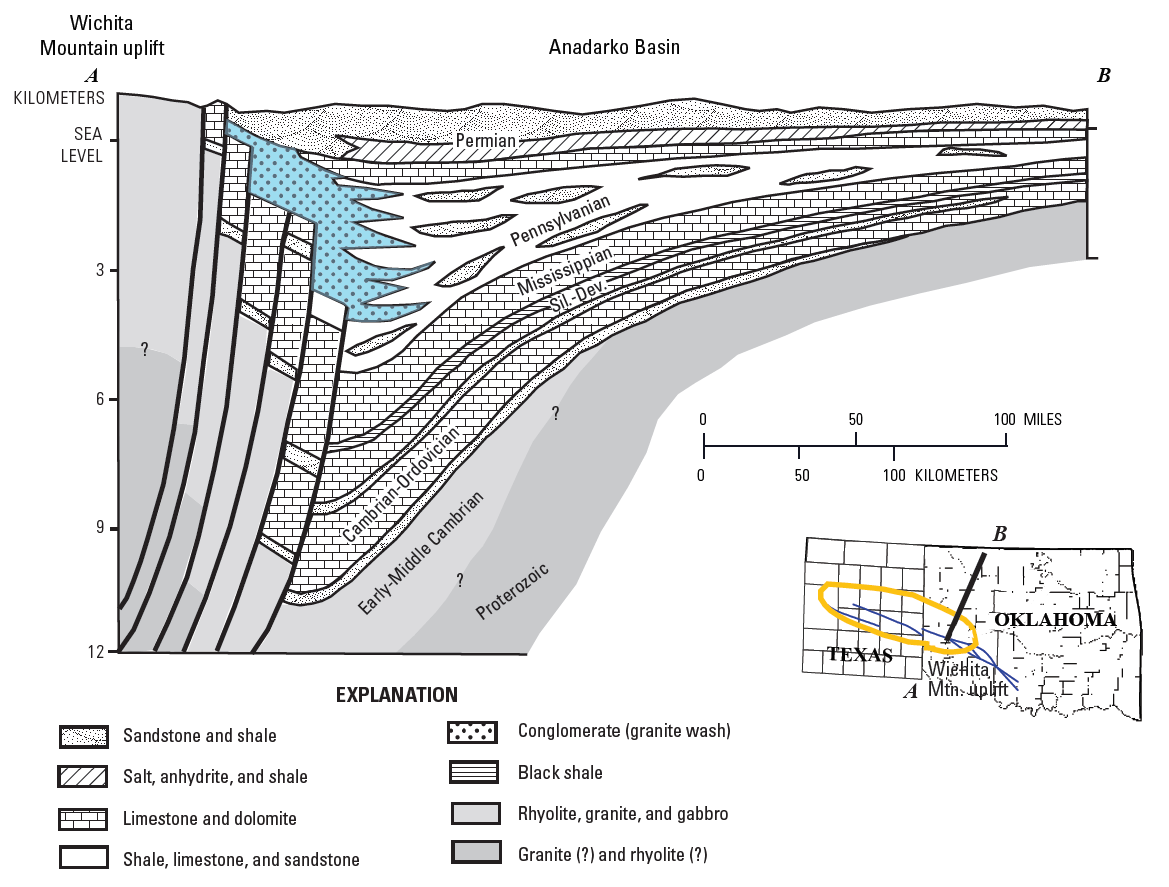
Anadarko Basin Geologic Cross Section

The Anadarko Basin is a geologic depositional and structural basin centered in the western part of the state of Oklahoma and the Texas Panhandle, and extending into southwestern Kansas and southeastern Colorado. The basin covers an area of 50,000 square miles (130,000 km^{2}). By the end of the 20th Century, the Anadarko Basin was producing the largest amount of natural gas in the United States. Notable oil and gas fields within the basin include the Hugoton-Panhandle Gas Field, West Edmond Field, Union City Field and the Elk City Field. The basin is also the only commercial source of iodine in the United States and a major producer of helium.

== Name ==
The name likely comes from either the city of Anadarko, Oklahoma or the Nadaco tribe.

== Geology ==
The basin is bound on the south by the Wichita-Amarillo uplift, on the east by the Nemaha uplift, on the north by the Central Kansas uplift, and on the west by the Las Animas arch.

Sedimentary rocks from Cambrian through Permian age fill the basin. The sedimentary column is thickest, in excess of 40,000 feet (12,000 m), at the southern edge, next to the upfaulted Wichita-Amarillo uplift. The basin has an especially thick section of Pennsylvanian rocks, up to 15,000 feet (4,600 m) thick. The sedimentary column is only 2,000 feet (610 m) thick on its northern and western flanks.

== Natural resources ==
=== Natural gas ===
The basin holds one of the most prolific natural gas reserves in North America, with ultimate gas production in excess of 100 trillion cubic feet (2,800 km^{3}) of gas. In 2010, the U.S. Geological Survey estimated that the Anadarko Basin held 27.5 trillion cubic feet of natural gas and 410 million barrels of natural gas liquids (NGL). An IHS Markit's report estimated more than 200 trillion cubic feet of natural gas in the basin. It is also the 5th-largest natural gas formation area in the United States.

The Lone Star Bertha Rogers well in Beckham County, Oklahoma held the record as the world's deepest producing well in 1974-1979. It has subsequently been surpassed by several other deep wells, see deepest artificial point. It was drilled to a depth of 31,441 feet (9,583 m).

=== Crude Oil ===
In 2010, the U.S. Geological Survey estimated that the Anadarko Basin held 495 million barrels of oil. In 2019, IHS Markit estimated that unconventional reservoirs in unrisked technically recoverable resources of the basin account for 16 billion barrels.

=== Brine ===
The brine in the Pennsylvanian Morrow Formation in the Anadarko Basin contains about 300 parts per million iodine, and is the only current commercial source of that element in the United States. Three companies extract iodine from brine produced as a byproduct of natural gas production from depths of 5,000 feet (1,500 m) to 13,000 feet (4,000 m). Iodine production in 2005 was 1,570 tonnes. The Woodward Iodine company plant is 3.7 miles (6.0 km) west of Woodward, Oklahoma and uses a 6,600 feet (2,000 m) deep well north of the city, while the IOCHEM plant 2.5 miles (4.0 km) east of Vici, Oklahoma extracts the brine from a 9,800 feet (3,000 m) deep well. North American Brine Resources operates a plant near Dover, Oklahoma.

=== Helium ===
Some natural gas in the basin has unusually high helium content (greater than 0.3%). Helium is recovered from produced natural gas as a byproduct. According to the Bureau of Land Management, Helium reserves in the Anadarko basin account for almost one billion cubic meters.

== See also ==
- Wichita Mountains
- Hugoton Natural Gas Area
