= Mum =

Mum or MUM may refer to:

== Art, entertainment and media ==
- múm, an Icelandic musical group
- "Mum", a song by Luke Hemmings from When Facing The Things We Turn Away From
- Mum Jokmok, a Thai comedian
- Mum (TV series), a UK sitcom that aired on BBC Two from 2017 to 2019
- Mum (film)
- "Mum" (On the Up), a sitcom episode
- M-U-M (Magic-Unity-Might) magazine

== Science ==
- Multifocal plane microscopy
- Maximal unique match

== Universities ==
- Monash University, Malaysia campus
- Maharishi University of Management, in the United States
- Muslim University of Morogoro in Tanzania

== Other uses ==
- Mother, or mum in colloquial British and Commonwealth English
- Chrysanthemum, or mum, a plant
- Bamum kingdom or Mum, Cameroon
- Mum, Burma, a village in Burma
- Mum language, a language spoken in Papua New Guinea
- Mum (deodorant)
- Brunswick Mum, a beer
- Chhatrapati Shivaji International Airport, Mumbai (IATA code: MUM)

== See also ==
- Mums (disambiguation)
- Mumm, a French champagne producer
- Mom (disambiguation)
- Mummy (disambiguation)
