= For Which We Stand =

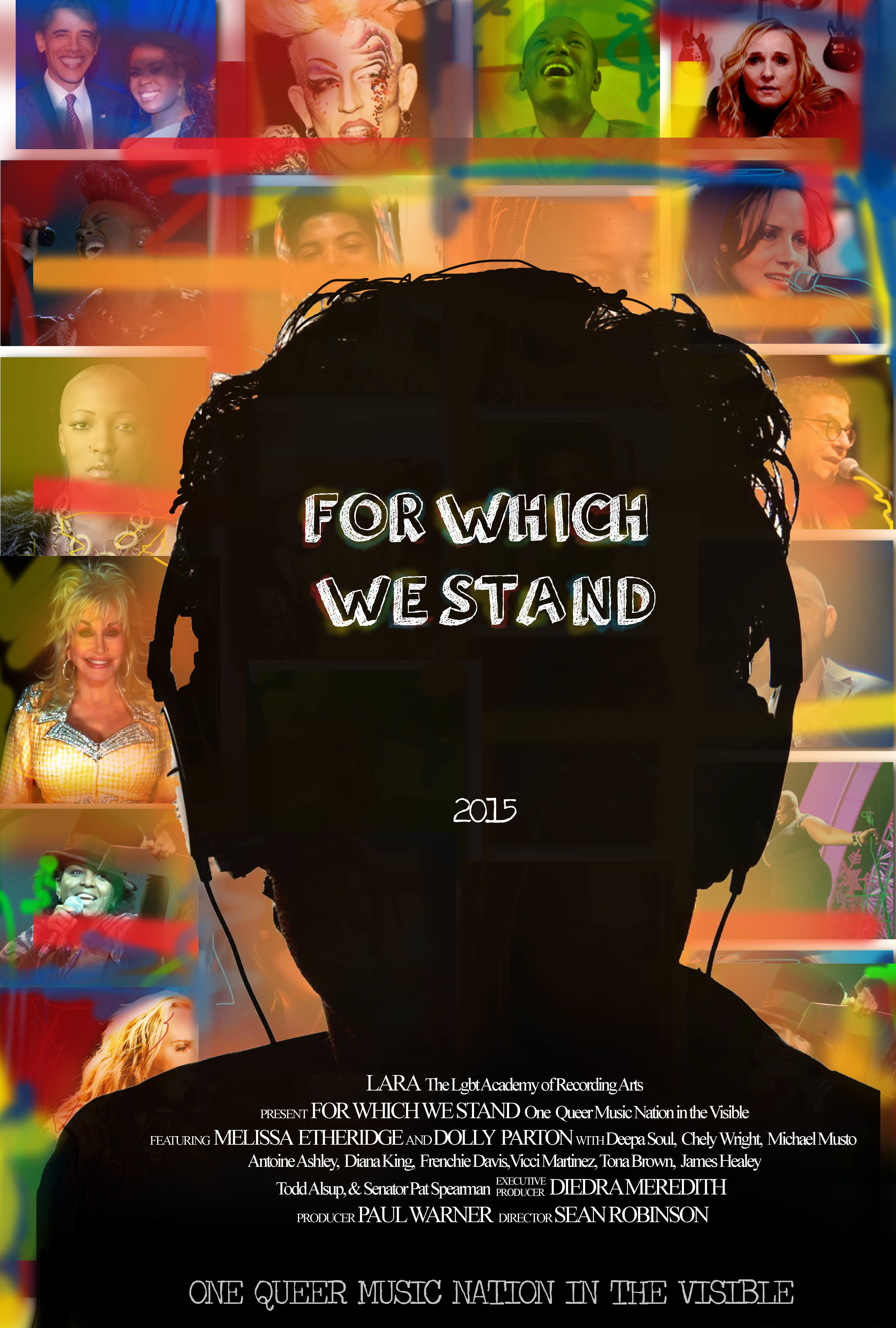
- Directed by: Sean Robinson
- Produced by: Paul Warner
- Starring: Michael Musto; Dolly Parton; Melissa Etheridge; Frenchie Davis; Diana King; Chely Wright; Tona Brown; Deepa Soul
- Edited by: Sean Robinson
- Music by: Various artists
- Release date: 2015
- Running time: 120 minutes
- Country: United States
- Language: English
- Budget: 750K

For Which We Stand, is a full-length documentary film. The film highlights LGBTQ and straight artists through numerous interviews with musicians and music-industry insiders, as well as live performances and behind-the-scenes footage.

The participants include Michael Musto, Dolly Parton, Melissa Etheridge, Frenchie Davis, Diana King, Chely Wright, and transgender violinist and vocalist Tona Brown.

The film was directed by Sean Robinson and produced by Paul Warner.

== Quotes ==
Director Sean Robinson says of the film, "I’m very excited to be directing this socially and politically pro-active feature-length documentary film that will not only spotlight queer music culture, but will keep the torch of LARA burning as the fight for equality moves into the next era."

Producer Paul Warner says: "While experiencing considerable gains, there has also been an escalation of bullying and continued discrimination, so the pursuit of equality is far from over. Of equal importance, I am excited to collaborate with music and media artists from all disciplines whose passion for and undying dedication to their craft will shape our future cultural and political landscape."

== Cast ==
- Michael Musto as himself
- Dolly Parton as herself
- Melissa Etheridge as herself
- Frenchie Davis as herself
- Diana King as herself
- Chely Wright as herself
- Frenchie Davis as herself
- Tona Brown as herself
- Antoine Ashley as herself
- Vicci Martinez as herself
- Todd Alsup as himself
- Deepa Soul as herself
- Pat Spearman as herself
- James Healey as himself
- Athena Reich as herself
- Christine Martucci as herself
