= I Love Her (disambiguation) =

"I Love Her" is a 2009 song by Marques Houston.

I Love Her may also refer to:

- I Love Her (film), a 2013 Ukrainian short film
- I Love Her (album) or Aku Cinta Dia, a 1985 album by Chrisye
- "I Love Her", a 1972 song by Frijid Pink
- "I Luv Her", a 2024 song by GloRilla featuring T-Pain

== See also ==
- And I Love Her, a 1964 song written and recorded by the Beatles
