= Kola Superdeep Borehole =

Earth's deepest borehole, Murmansk Oblast, Russia

Kola Superdeep Borehole SG-3
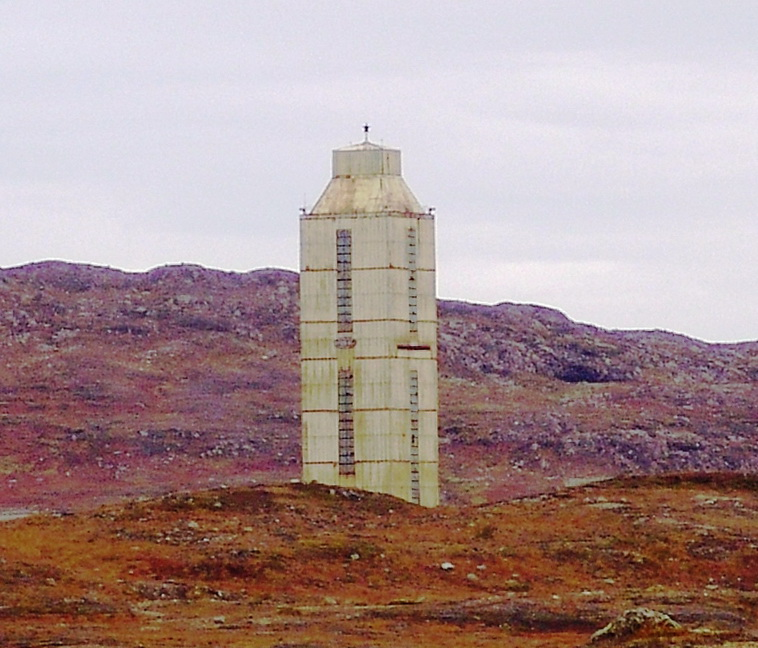
- Superstructure of the Kola Superdeep Borehole, 2007

- Location of the borehole in Murmansk Oblast, Russia Kola Superdeep Borehole (Murmansk Oblast)
- Location: Pechengsky District, Murmansk Oblast, Russia; 69.3965°N 30.6100°E
- Type: Scientific borehole
- Greatest depth: 12,262 metres (40,230 ft)
- Opened: 1965
- Active: 1970–1983; 1984; 1985–1992; 1994
- Closed: 1995

The Kola Superdeep Borehole SG-3 (Russian: Кольская сверхглубокая скважина СГ-3, romanized: Kol'skaya sverkhglubokaya skvazhina SG-3) has been the deepest human-made hole on Earth since 1979, attaining a maximum true vertical depth of 12,262 metres (40,230 ft) in 1989. It is the result of a scientific drilling effort to penetrate as deeply as possible into the Earth's crust conducted by the Soviet Union in the Pechengsky District of the Kola Peninsula, near the Russian border with Norway.

SG (СГ) is a Russian designation for a set of superdeep (Russian: сверхглубокая) boreholes conceived as part of a Soviet scientific research programme in the 1960s, 1970s, and 1980s. Aralsor SG-1 (in the Pre-Caspian Basin of west Kazakhstan) and Biyikzhal SG-2 (in Krasnodar Krai), both less than 6,810 metres (22,340 ft) deep, preceded Kola SG-3, which was originally intended to reach 7,000 metres (23,000 ft) deep. Drilling at Kola SG-3 began in 1970 using the Uralmash-4E, and later the Uralmash-15000 series drilling rig. A total of five 23-centimetre-diameter (9 in) boreholes were drilled, two branching from a central shaft and two from one of those branches.

In addition to being the deepest human-made hole on Earth, Kola Superdeep Borehole SG-3 was, for almost three decades, the world's longest borehole in measured depth along its bore, until surpassed in 2008 by a hydrocarbon extraction borehole at the Al Shaheen Oil Field in Qatar.

== Drilling ==
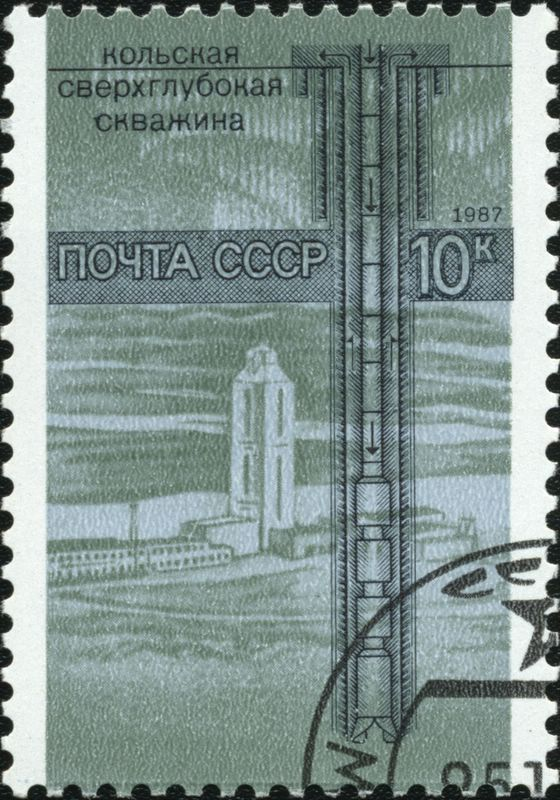
Kola Superdeep Borehole, commemorated on a 1987 USSR stamp

Drilling at Kola SG-3 began on 24 May 1970 using the Uralmash-4E, a serial drilling rig used for drilling oil wells. The rig was slightly modified to be able to reach a 7,000-metre (23,000 ft) depth. In 1974, the new purpose-built Uralmash-15000 drilling rig was installed onsite, named after the new target depth, set at 15,000 metres (49,000 ft).

On 6 June 1979, Kola SG-3 broke the world depth record which had been held by the Bertha Rogers hole in Washita County, Oklahoma, United States, at 9,583 metres (31,440 ft). In October 1982, Kola SG-3's first hole reached 11,662 metres (38,261 ft).

The second hole was started in January 1983 from a 9,300-metre (30,500 ft) depth of the first hole. In 1983, the drill passed 12,000 metres (39,000 ft) in the second hole, and drilling was stopped for about a year for numerous scientific and celebratory visits to the site. This idle period may have contributed to a breakdown after drilling resumed; on 27 September 1984, after drilling to 12,066 metres (39,587 ft), a 5-kilometre (3.1 mi) section of the drill string twisted off and was left in the hole. Drilling was restarted in September 1986, 7,000 metres (23,000 ft) from the first hole.

The third hole reached 12,262 metres (40,230 ft) in 1989. In that year, the hole depth was expected to reach 13,500 metres (44,300 ft) by the end of 1990 and 15,000 metres (49,000 ft) by 1993. In June 1990, a breakdown occurred in the third hole at 12,262 metres (40,230 ft) of depth.

The drilling of the fourth hole was started in January 1991 from 9,653 metres (31,670 ft) of depth of the third hole. The drilling of the fourth hole was stopped due to higher-than-expected temperatures of 180 °C (356 °F) in 1992 at 11,882 metres (38,983 ft) of depth.

Drilling of the fifth hole started in April 1994 from 8,278 metres (27,159 ft) of depth of the third hole. Drilling was stopped in August 1994 at 8,578 metres (28,143 ft) of depth due to lack of funds, and the well itself was mothballed.

== Research ==
The stated areas of study of the Kola Superdeep Borehole were the deep structure of the Baltic Shield, seismic discontinuities and the thermal regime in the Earth's crust, the physical and chemical composition of the deep crust and the transition from upper to lower crust, lithospheric geophysics, and to create and develop technologies for deep geophysical study. Drilling penetrated about a third of the way through the Baltic Shield of the continental crust, estimated to be around 35 kilometres (22 mi) deep, reaching Archean rocks at the bottom. Numerous unexpected geophysical discoveries were made:

- During the drilling process, the expected basaltic layers at 7 kilometres (4.3 mi) down were never found, nor were basaltic layers at any depth. There were instead more granites, deeper than predicted. The prediction of a transition at 7 kilometres was based on seismic waves indicating discontinuity, which could have been caused by a transition between rocks, or a metamorphic transition in the granite itself.
- Water pooled 3–6 kilometres (1.9–3.7 mi) below the surface, having percolated up through the granite until it reached a layer of impermeable rock. This water did not naturally vaporize at any depth in the borehole.
- The drilling mud that flowed out of the hole was described as "boiling" with an unexpected level of hydrogen gas.
- Microscopic plankton fossils were found 6 kilometres (3.7 mi) below the surface.

In 1992, an international geophysical experiment obtained a reflection seismic crustal cross-section through the well. The Kola-92 working group consisted of researchers from the universities of Glasgow and Edinburgh in the United Kingdom, the University of Wyoming in the United States, and the University of Bergen in Norway, as well as several Russian earth science research institutions. The experiment was documented in a video recorded by David Smythe, which shows the drilling deck in action during an attempt to recover a tool dropped down the hole.

== Status ==
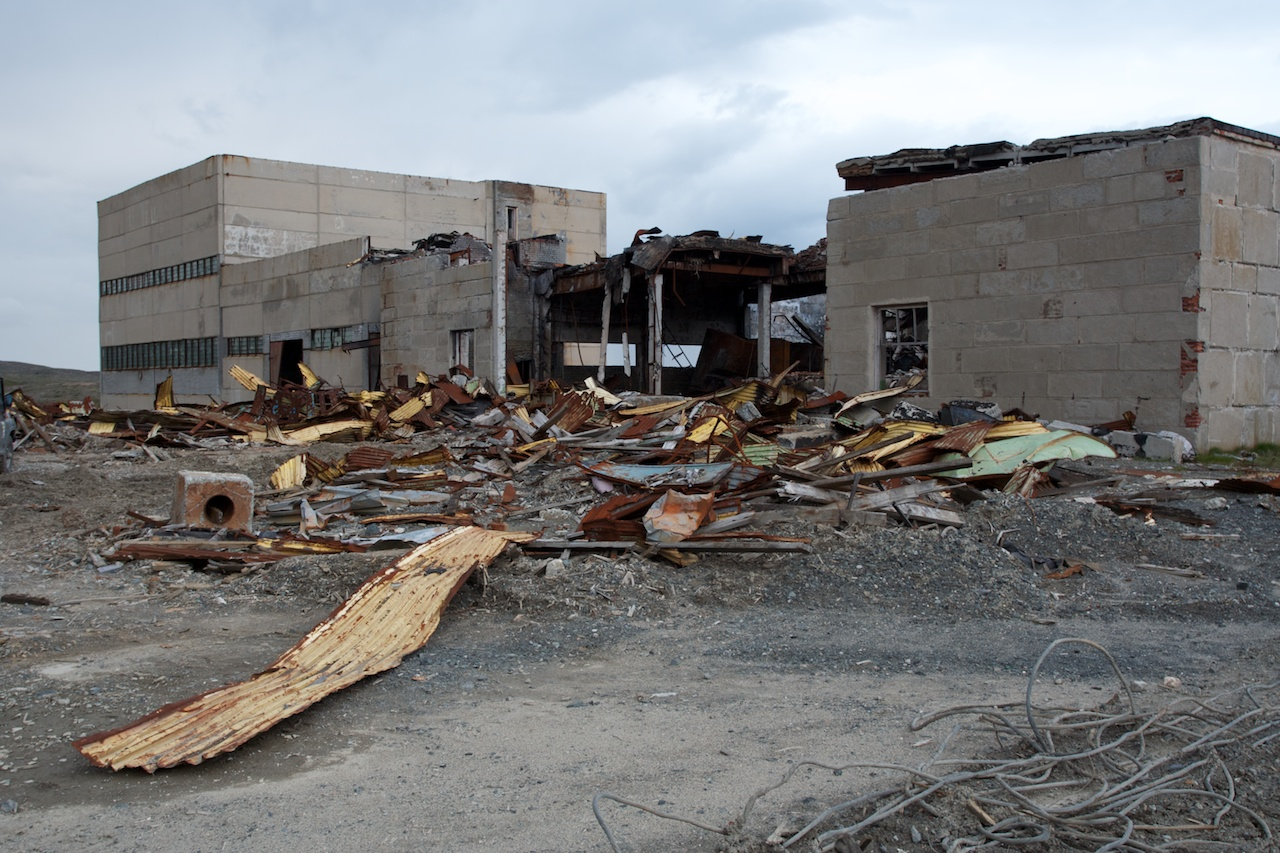
The borehole site in 2012

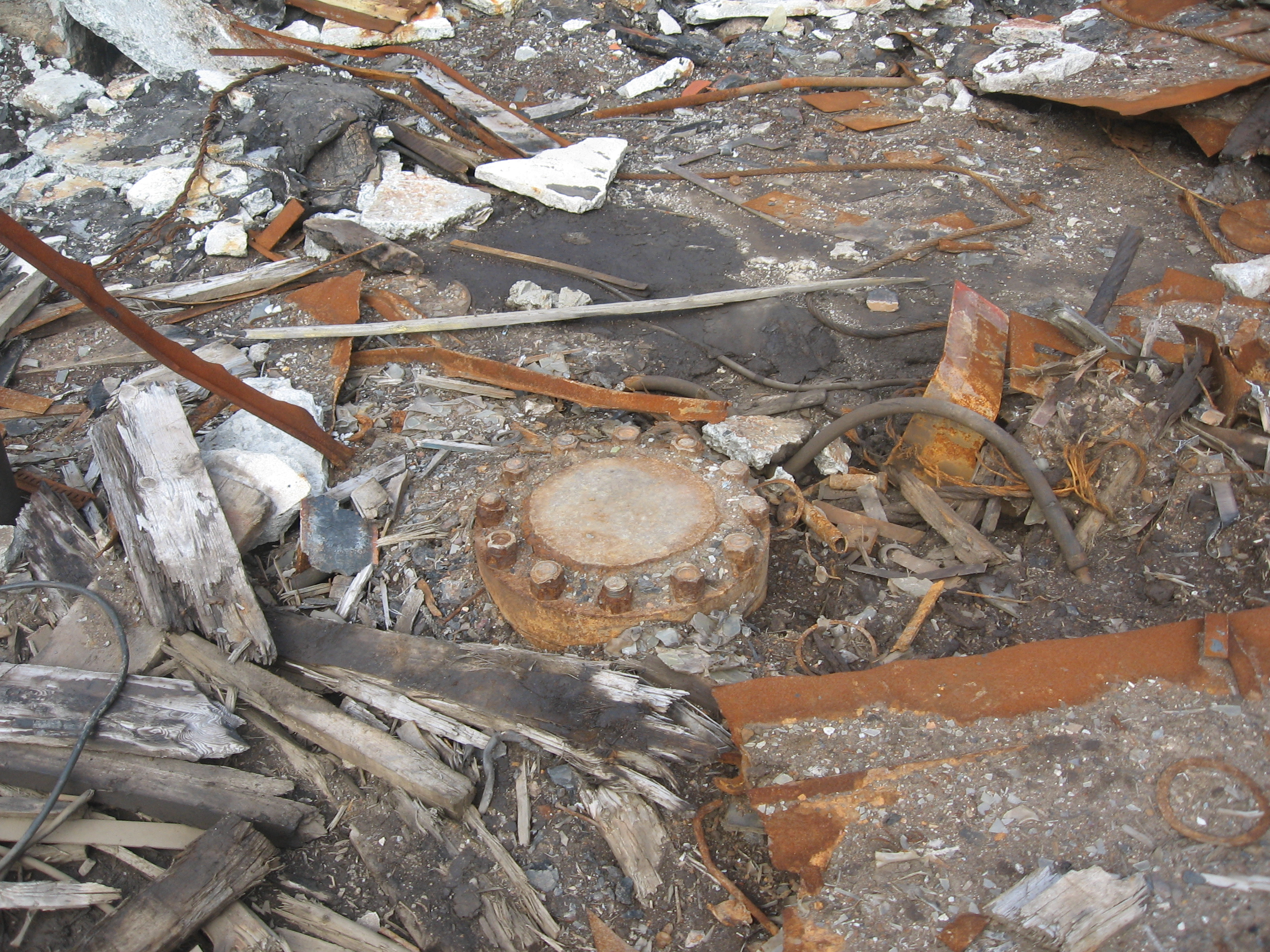
The borehole (welded shut), August 2012

The drilling ended in 1995 due to a lack of funding. The scientific team was transferred to the federal state unitary subsidiary enterprise "Kola Superdeep," downsized, and given the new task of thoroughly studying the exposed section. In 2007, the scientific team was dissolved and the equipment was transferred to a private company and partially liquidated.

In 2008, the company was liquidated due to unprofitability, and the site was abandoned. It is still visited by sightseers, who report that the structure over the borehole has been partially destroyed or removed.

== Similar projects ==
- The United States had embarked on a similar project in 1957, dubbed Project Mohole, which was intended to penetrate the shallow crust under the Pacific Ocean off Mexico. After initial drilling, the project was abandoned in 1966 when funding was cut off. This program inspired the Ocean Drilling Program, Integrated Ocean Drilling Program, and the International Ocean Discovery Program which concluded in 2024.
- The KTB superdeep borehole (German Continental Deep Drilling Programme, 1987–1995) at Windischeschenbach in northern Bavaria was drilled to a depth of 9,101 metres (29,859 ft), reaching temperatures of more than 260 °C (500 °F). Its ambitious measuring program used high-temperature logging tools that were upgraded specifically for KTB.
- In 2023, China embarked on a 10,000-metre (33,000 ft; 6.2 mi) super-deep borehole in the Tarim Basin in the Xinjiang region for scientific, oil and gas exploration. In March 2024, drilling of the borehole, which is known as Shendi Take 1, reached a depth of 10,000 metres.

== Records ==
The 12,262-metre (40,230 ft) deep Kola Superdeep Borehole has been the world's deepest borehole since 1979. It was also the longest borehole in the world from 1979 to 2008. Its record length was surpassed in May 2008 by the curved extended reach drilling bore of well BD-04A in the Al Shaheen Oil Field in Qatar, which attained a total length of 12,289 metres (40,318 ft) but depth of just 1,387 metres (4,551 ft).

== See also ==
- 12 Kilometers – 2016 film by Mike Pecci, set at Kola Borehole
- Chikyū – Japanese drill ship, deep oceanic drilling ship, which achieved a subsea drilling record in 2012
- Denman Glacier – Glacier in Queen Mary Land, Antarctica, covers the lowest point on land
- Earthscope – Earth science program exploring the structure of the North American continent
- Extreme points of Earth
- Lake Vostok – Antarctica's largest known subglacial lake
- List of deepest mines
- Mohorovičić discontinuity – Boundary between the Earth's crust and the mantle
- San Andreas Fault Observatory at Depth – Deep borehole intersecting the San Andreas Fault
- USArray – US earth science project collecting seismic images of the North American lithosphere
- Vertical seismic profile — relevant seismic measurements
- Well to Hell – Urban legend regarding borehole in Russia
