= Topaz Jones =

American rapper and singer

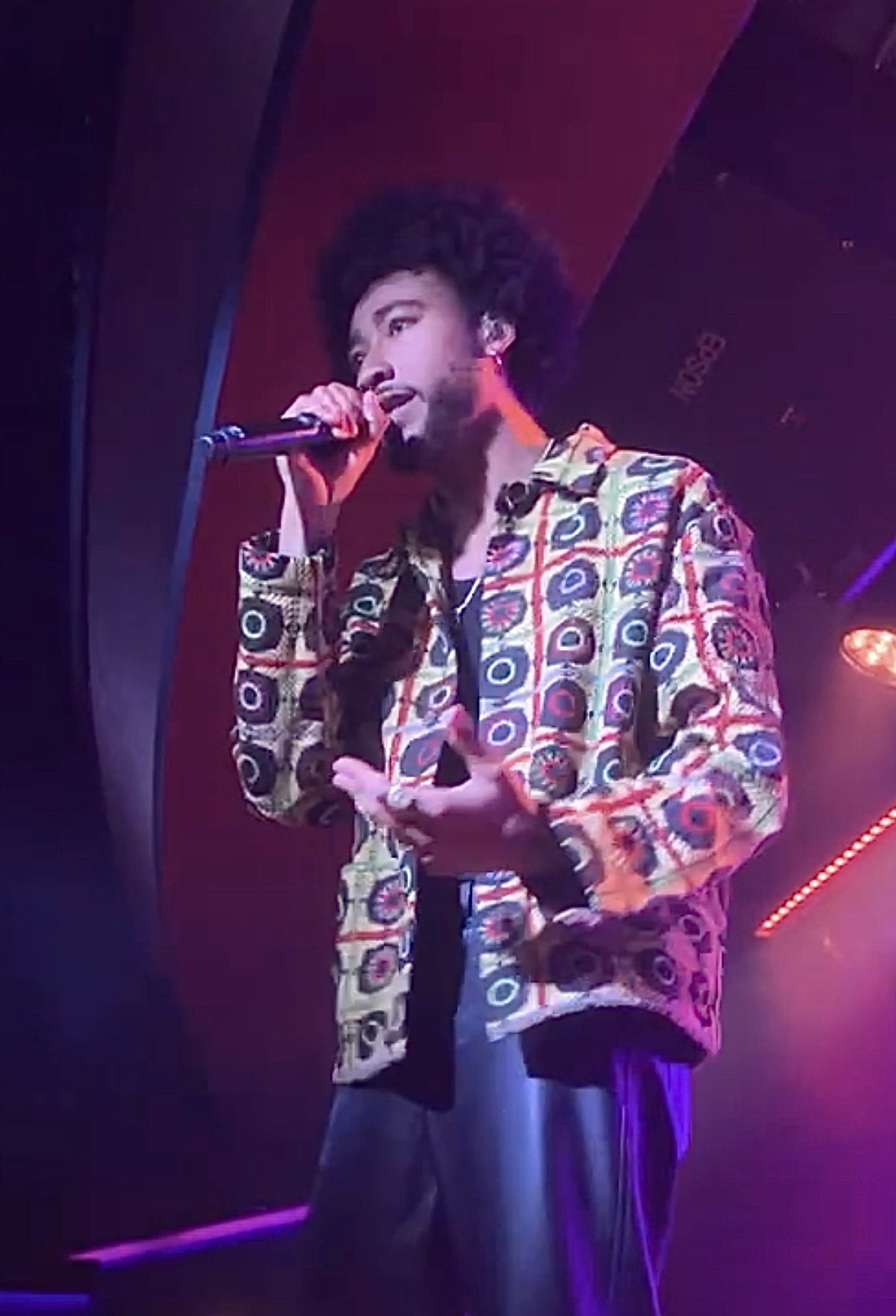
- Jones in 2022

Background information
- Born: George David Brandon Jones; 1993 (age 32–33); Montclair, New Jersey, U.S.
- Genres: Hip hop; alternative hip hop; conscious rap; trap; funk
- Occupations: Rapper; singer; filmmaker
- Instrument: Vocals
- Years active: 2013–present
- Label: New Funk Academy
- Website: www.topazjones.com//

George David Brandon Jones (born 1993), known professionally as Topaz Jones, is an American rapper and singer.

== Early life ==
Jones was born in 1993 in Montclair, New Jersey, where he was raised. His father Curt Jones was a funk guitarist who played in the bands Slave and Aurra, and his mother was a Harvard scholar. He graduated from the New York University Tisch School of the Arts.

== Musical career ==
In 2013, Jones released his debut single "Coping Mechanism".

Jones's debut album, The Honeymoon Suite, was released in 2014. His second album, Arcade, was released in 2016. This album featured the single Tropicana, which Pitchfork described as a "viral hit", and Motion Sickness.

In 2021, Jones released the visual album Don't Go Tellin' Your Momma, an album accompanied by a short film of the same name directed by Jones and directing duo Rubberband. The film won the Sundance Film Festival Short Film Jury Award, as well as South by Southwest's Special Jury Recognition for Visionary Storytelling. After the award victories, the film was made available online as part of The New York Times' Op-Docs video series. The album was described by Stereogum as "one of the best albums of 2021".

== Discography ==
=== Studio albums ===
List of albums, with release date and label shown
Title	Album details
Arcade	Released: October 28, 2016; Label: New Funk Academy; Formats: Digital download, streaming
Don't Go Tellin' Your Momma	Released: April 23, 2021; Label: New Funk Academy, Black Canopy; Formats: Digital download, streaming

=== Mixtapes ===
List of albums, with release date and label shown
Title	Album details
The Honeymoon Suite	Released: January 28, 2014; Formats: Digital download, streaming
