= Tona Brown =

American singer

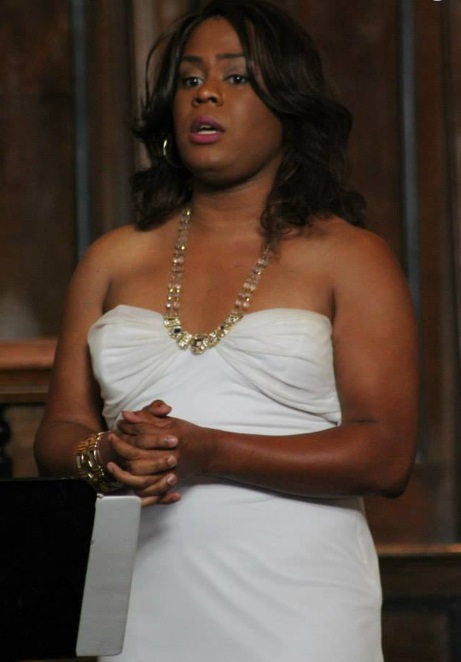
- Brown in 2016

Background information
- Born: Tona Brown
- Origin: Norfolk, Virginia, U.S.
- Genres: Classical
- Occupations: Singer, violinist
- Instruments: Vocals, violin
- Years active: 1994–present
- Website: tonabrown.com

Tona Brown is an American violinist and mezzo-soprano who performs internationally and is the first transgender woman to perform at Carnegie Hall. She was the first African American transgender woman to perform for an American president.

== Early life and education ==
Brown had challenges with her gender identity growing up and referred to herself as an "androgynous" child (partly male and partly female in the appearance of indeterminate sex). She started playing violin at the age of 10, attended the Governor's School for the Arts, an art high school program for gifted and talented students. Brown was formally educated at the Shenandoah Conservatory of Music studying violin performance with minors in viola, piano, and voice.

== Career ==
She was selected to perform in a national tour with the "Tranny Road Show", a multi-media tour group of transgender artists that toured from Florida to Canada in April 2006. Brown was chosen by the White House to sing the National Anthem for former President Barack Obama at the 2014 LGBTQ Leadership Gala Dinner at the Sheraton in New York City, making her the first transgender artist to be given this honor. Brown was also selected to be a performer for the 2011 Out Music Awards. On June 25, 2014, Brown performed at the Weill Recital Hall of Carnegie Hall. In 2015, Brown appeared in For Which We Stand, a full-length documentary film highlighting LGBTQ and straight artists. Brown recorded an opera movie for Shenandoah University's 2021 production of Suor Angelica playing the role of La Zia Principessa. Brown performed in a lead transgender role as Hannah After in the opera As One by Laura Kaminsky with the Lowell Chamber Orchestra under the direction of Orlando Cela in the fall of 2021. Brown was also asked to do a masterclass on Transgender Voices by the Virginia National Association of Teachers of singing and teaches private lessons to students with her company Aida Studios.

== Influences ==
Brown is an advocate for transgender issues and the arts and participates in speaking engagements primarily on the east coast. She also focuses on trans issues in her online TV series, Conversations with Tona Brown. Her words of advice for transgender youth are to "not allow others to make you believe that you are not worthy of achieving what dreams you have. I can't tell you how many people had no problems telling me that I would not succeed being 'out' as a transgender artist."

== Discography ==
- This Is Who I Am (2012)
