= Two Balloons =

- Film poster
- Directed by: Mark Smith
- Written by: Mark Smith
- Cinematography: Reijean Heringlake
- Music by: Peter Broderick
- Distributed by: Ouat Media
- Release date: October 30, 2017
- Running time: 9 minutes
- Country: United States

Two Balloons is a 2017 stop-motion animated short film written and directed by Mark Smith. The film premiered at the 2017 Foyle Film Festival.

== Summary ==
The film is about two adventurous lemurs that navigate their airships halfway around the world, to a place where happenstance and fate threaten to disrupt their reunion.

== Accolades ==
Year	Presenter/Festival	Award/Category	Status
2018	Tribeca Film Festival	Best Animated Short	Nominated
2018	Toronto International Film Festival	Adult Jury Award; Best Animated Short	Won
2018	Animafest Zagreb	Jury Award; Special Mention	Won
2018	Ale Kino!	Marcinek; Best Short Film	Won
2018	Flickerfest	Best International Short Film	Nominated
2018	Woodstock Film Festival	Maverick Award; Best Animated Short	Won
2018	Austin Film Festival	Animated Short	Nominated
2018	Clermont-Ferrand International Short Film Festival	International Competition	Nominated
2018	Hamptons International Film Festival	Best Short	Nominated
2018	Rhode Island International Film Festival	First Prize; Best Short Animation	Won
2018	Port Townsend Film Festival	Special Jury Prize; Animation Short Narrative	Won
2018	Fantasia International Film Festival	Best Short Film	Nominated
2019	Long Island International Film Expo	Best Animation - Stop Motion	Won
