= Sean Robinson (filmmaker) =

American film director and editor (born 1985)

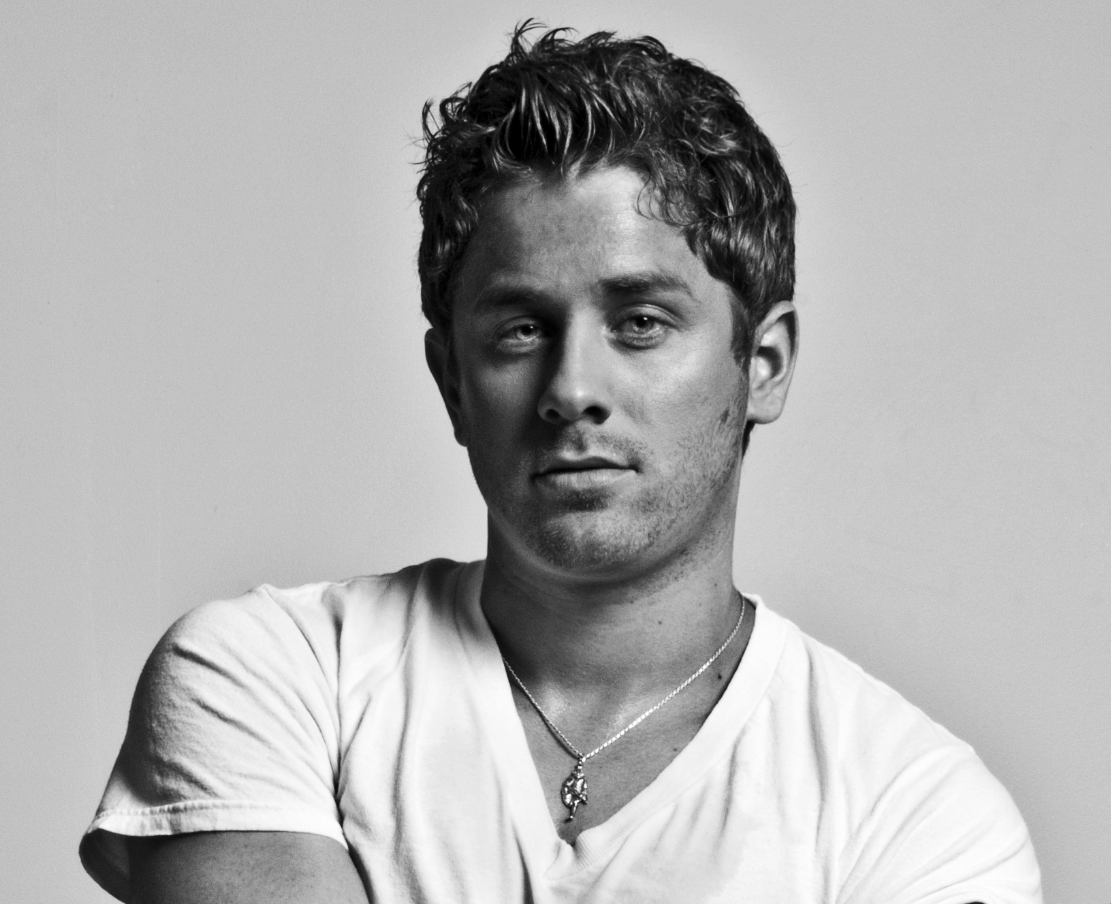
- Occupations: film director, film editor
- Years active: 2014–present

Sean Robinson (born 1985) is an American film director and editor. Following his filmmaking studies in New York City, his subsequent films have included The Puritans, Naked and OUTmusic's documentary film For Which We Stand.

Robinson was profiled by The Advocate on 7 June 2013 and was the cover story for Pink Magazine's Winter 2014 issue. On 4 November 2015 Robinson was interviewed by Billboard (magazine) noting Amy Lee's soundtrack for the Science fiction film Indigo Grey: The Passage, directed by Robinson. The Huffington Post praised Robinson's work on Indigo Grey: The Passage as "well edited, elegantly directed" in an in-depth review by Music & Culture Journalist Morena Duwe. On February 3, 2017 The Huffington Post profiled Robinson's work at the New York Film Academy as the lead producer on a series of original movie musicals, "The common thread that binds this series together is Sean Robinson who has been involved with every film since the program’s inception. The several moving parts bring variety while Robinson brings consistency as he bridges the gap between theater and film."

== Film awards and nominations ==
- International Short Film Festival "Kharkov Lilac": Grand Prix Award-won (Sean Robinson, 2013)
- Carmarthen Bay Film Festival: Best International Short-won (The Puritans, 2013)
- NW Short Film Festival: Best Original Concept-won (Sean Robinson, 2013)
- Vagrant Film Festival: Audience Choice Award-won (The Puritans, 2013)
- Melbourne Underground Film Festival: Best Short Film-nominated (The Puritans, 2013)
- The Northwest Ohio Film Festival: Outstanding Short Film-nominated, Audience Choice-nominated, Outstanding Direction: Sean Robinson-nominated, Outstanding Actress-Short: Eileen Kearney-nominated, Outstanding Screenplay: Paul Warner & Sean Robinson-nominated (The Puritans, 2013)
- Chain NYC Film Festival: Best Musical Short-won (Naked, 2013)
- Manhattan Film Festival: Best Musical Short-won (Naked, 2013)
- Parma International Music Film Festival: Best Song-won (Naked, 2013)
- Long Island International Film Expo: Best Original Song-won (Naked, 2013)
- Snake Alley Festival of Film: Best Comedy-nominated (Naked, 2013)
- Asia Pacific International Film Festival: Platinum Award (Indigo Grey: The Passage, 2015)
- World Film Awards: Platinum World Award (Indigo Grey: The Passage, 2015)
- Accolade Global Film Competition: Award Of Excellence (Indigo Grey: The Passage, 2015)
- Moondance International Film Festival: Best Original Score Amy Lee Dave Eggar and Chuck Palmer (Indigo Grey: The Passage, 2015)
