= Mums =

Mums or MUMS may refer to:

- A Mother (in colloquial British and Commonwealth English usage)
- Chrysanthemums, a genus of flowering plants
- muMs da Schemer, an American actor
- Mums Records, a record label
- Makerere University School of Medicine, in Uganda
- Mashhad University of Medical Sciences, in Iran
- Movimiento Unificado de Minorías Sexuales, a Chilean LGBT rights organization
- MUMS (Musik under miljoner stjärnor), an album by Ralph Lundsten

== See also ==
- Mum (disambiguation)
