= Fall Time =

- Movie poster
- Directed by: Paul Warner
- Written by: Steve Alden; Paul Skemp
- Produced by: Edward Bates
- Starring: Mickey Rourke; David Arquette; Stephen Baldwin; Sheryl Lee
- Cinematography: Mark J. Gordon
- Edited by: Steven Nevius
- Music by: Hummie Mann
- Production companies: Capitol Films; Live Entertainment; Bates Entertainment
- Release date: January 1995
- Running time: 88 minutes
- Country: United States
- Language: English
- Budget: $4 million

Fall Time is a 1995 American drama film starring Mickey Rourke, David Arquette, Stephen Baldwin and Sheryl Lee, directed by Paul Warner and co-written by Paul Skemp and Steve Alden. It premiered at the Sundance Film Festival in 1995.

== Plot ==
In the 1950s in rural Wisconsin, a trio of young friends, David, Tim and Joe, stage a prank murder in front of a local bank where a real life robbery, led by criminals and gay lovers, Leon and Florence, is going down.

After the crime is botched, Florence forces Tim to rob the bank himself and take as a hostage the bank loan officer Patty, who is in on the robbery, but the plan goes wildly wrong and morphs into macabre bloodbath.

== Principal cast ==
- David Arquette as David
- Mickey Rourke as Florence Nightingale
- Stephen Baldwin as Leon
- Jason London as Tim
- Jonah Blechman as Joe
- Sheryl Lee as Patty / Carol
- Jeff Gardner as Ken
- Steve Alden as Officer Lyle
- Michael Edelstein as Bank Manager
- Richard K. Olsen as Officer Duane

== Critical reception ==
Although it was nominated for the Grand Jury Prize at Sundance Film Festival it lost to The Brothers McMullen.

Todd McCarthy of Variety did not care for the film:

"There's material here for a film, at most, half the length of Fall Time, a thoroughly pedestrian crime drama."

Glenn Kenny of Entertainment Weekly wrote:

"Think that the idea of Mickey Rourke and Stephen Baldwin playing a pair of gay psychos sounds bad? You should only experience the reality."

Kenny also dubbed the film as "pointless sadism and tiresome pseudoexistential philosophizing." adding, "Unless you’re really interested in hearing Rourke call Baldwin ”honey,” avoid Fall Time at all costs.
