= Highway Heartbreaker =

- Genre: Drama
- Written by: Deborah A. Serra
- Directed by: Paul Schneider
- Starring: John Schneider; Linda Gray; Heather Locklear; Tracy Nelson
- Music by: Mark Snow
- Country of origin: United States
- Original language: English language

Production
- Producers: Howard Burkons; Diane Walsh
- Production location: San Diego
- Cinematography: Eric Van Haren Noman
- Editor: Andrew Cohen
- Running time: 96 minutes
- Production companies: Gross-Weston Productions; Stephen J. Cannell Productions

Original release
- Network: CBS
- Release: March 29, 1992

Highway Heartbreaker is a 1992 television film directed by Paul Schneider. The film was based on the true story of Joseph (Mac) Duffy, who in 1990 pleaded guilty to four counts of grand theft for con schemes in Orange County and was subsequently dubbed in the media as 'the Playboy of the Coast Highway'.

== Plot ==
Catherine (Linda Gray) is a wealthy and lonely woman who has been handicapped ever since getting involved in a car accident, which she herself caused on the day of signing her divorce papers four years prior due to driving under the influence. During the accident she broke her back and suffered third degree burns. One day while driving on the highway, she meets Mickey Kenton (John Schneider), who claims to run investments for his father. She immediately falls for his charms and they start dating straight away. One day, he borrows $30,000 from her for a 'promising stock offer' in medial equipment, then vanishes following the money transaction. Catherine grows convinced that he is kidnapped and contacts private investigator Bert Quinn (Brock Peters), but he quickly finds out that Mickey is a con man. Quinn tracks Mickey down and threatens to unmask him.

Meanwhile, Mickey meets Alex (Heather Locklear), an overworked but very ambitious stockbroker on the verge of breaking in a major corporate client. Her father (Dick O'Neill) disapproves of her car purchases which she claims will help her land the breakthrough she desperately wants. She is immediately infatuated with Mickey, who now claims to be in international trade. Aspiring to get into international trade herself, Alex repeatedly meets up with Mickey in hopes of starting a joint venture. When one day she lands a deal with the corporate client, she uses the $15,000 acquired from the deal to invest in a business deal with Mickey. A day later, he tells her the stakes have been raised and that he needs an additional $25,000, which in reality he intends to use to buy a car. Even though she does not have the money, she draws him the cheque, hopeful that she will land another deal within the company. However, immediately after signing the cheque she finds out that the major client has pulled back. However, Mickey is unwilling to return her the money and threatens to harm her if she goes to the police. She nevertheless contacts the police, who reveal that Mickey is a con man with several aliases.

By that time, Mickey has already moved on to his new victim, Annie (Tracy Nelson), a young woman running a charity for a church who needs to raise $5,000 for a children's clinic on a short term. Mickey lures her into a private investment deal, claiming that she can get $6,000 out of a $1,000 investment. While staying at her place, he is once again approached by Quinn and realizes that the private investigator will not leave him alone. Therefore, he decides to return to Catherine and convinces her that he had to leave town for a while for his mother's funeral. She forgives him and allows him to move in with her. Meanwhile, the police and Quinn build a strong case against Mickey and track down the car that he bought with Alex's money. Alex immediately heads out to the car dealer to retrieve the car and finds Catherine, who was told by Mickey that the car was bought in her name. Alex tells Catherine that Mickey is a con man, but she refuses to believe her. A short while later, Mickey is arrested and the media reveal all of his cons. Alex and Annie are the only two victims stepping forward, and Alex even sells all of her belongings to finance the case against him.

Despite the media attention and the warnings of her teenage daughter Emily (Dedee Pfeiffer), Catherine bails him out of jail and elopes with him. When the trial against Mickey starts, however, she slowly starts to believe the accusations against him and eventually teams up with Alex and Annie. At that moment, Mickey claims to have left to Arizona for work, but the bail requires him to call in once a day. In Arizona, he is already working on a new victim when the three women lure him into town with a fake story. When he arrives, he is arrested and sent off to jail. In the closing credits, it is revealed that Mickey was given a suspended sentence, contingent upon restitution to his victims. However, no restitution was ever made.

== Cast ==
- John Schneider as Mickey Kenton
- Linda Gray as Catherine Brandon
- Heather Locklear as Alexandra Moulton
- Tracy Nelson as Annie
- Dick O'Neill as Alex's Father
- Dedee Pfeiffer as Emily Brandon
- John Kapelos as Detective Baker
- Meg Wittner as Lillian Brand
- Jon Korkes as Jack Hudson
- Brock Peters as Bert Quinn
- Lloyd Battista as Rupert Menlow
- Tonye Patano as Carolyn
