= Tonye Patano =

American actress

Tonye T. Patano
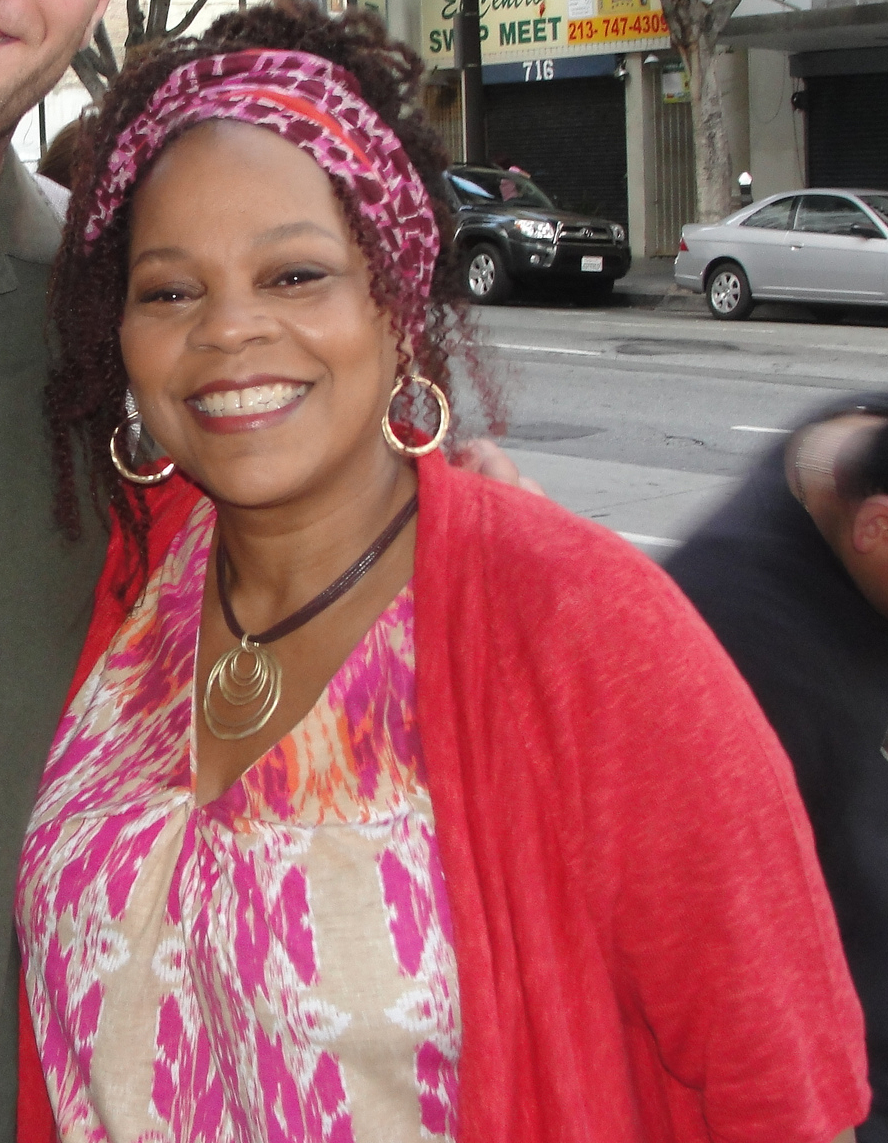
- Patano in 2011
- Occupation: Actress
- Years active: 1984–present

Tonye T. Patano is an American actress. She may be best known as Heylia James on the television series Weeds.

She has appeared in television shows such as Law & Order, Sex and the City, Monk and Third Watch. Patano was in the original cast of the Broadway play, 45 Seconds from Broadway by Neil Simon.

== Career ==
=== Film and television ===
Patano's first screen role was in the 1984 television film The Jesse Owens Story. She has appeared on several television series in guest roles, including Sex and the City, Monk, Third Watch, Curb Your Enthusiasm and Elementary. Patano has played various characters throughout the Law & Order franchise.

She appeared as Carolyn in Highway Heartbreaker (1992), and had a small role in A Price Above Rubies (1998). Other film work includes Little Manhattan and The Great New Wonderful, both released in 2005.

In 2005, Patano landed the role of Heylia James, a marijuana dealer, on Weeds. She received a Screen Actors Guild Award nomination for Outstanding Performance by an Ensemble in a Comedy Series alongside her Weeds co-stars in 2006. Two years later, Patano earned an NAACP Image Award nomination for Outstanding Supporting Actress in a Comedy Series as Heylia. Patano left the series at the conclusion of its third season, later returning in season 7 on a recurring basis.

Following Weeds, she portrayed Emily in Hallmark movie Loving Leah (2009).She played a probation officer in drama Jack of the Red Hearts (2015). Patano was Beverly, a counselor, in A Vigilante (2018).

=== Stage ===
Patano portrayed Nurse O'Neil in a 1997 production of The Sunshine Boys at the George Street Playhouse. One reviewer claimed she was "excellent" in the role. In 2000, she received a Connecticut Critics Circle Award for best ensemble after acting in From the Mississippi Delta. Patano appeared on Broadway as Ms. Gravátt in 45 Seconds from Broadway (2001).

She played the role of brothel owner Mama Nadi in Ruined for the Huntington Theater. Her performance in this production received positive reception, with one critic calling her "delightful" and "magnetic." Another found her superb in the role of Mama Nadi.

== Personal life ==
At age 35, Patono was diagnosed with diabetes, and she suffered a stroke in 2005.

== Filmography ==
=== Films ===
Year	Film	Role	Awards
1984	The Jesse Owens Story	Laverne Owens	
1992	Highway Heartbreaker	Carolyn	
1994	Fresh	Girl #2	
1998	A Price Above Rubies	Earring woman	
1999	The Hurricane	Woman at prison	
2004	Messengers	Linda Mabry	
2004	Imaginary Heroes	Big Mean Teacher	Voice role
2005	Room	Homeless woman	
2005	The Great New Wonderful	Shirley	
2005	The Thing About My Folks	Nurse	
2005	Little Manhattan	Birdie	
2007	The Savages	Mrs. Robinson	
2007	Trainwreck: My Life as an Idiot	Mrs. Shelby	
2009	The Taking of Pelham 123	Regina	
2009	Loving Leah	Emily	TV movie
2009	Bunker Hill	Nurse Evans	TV movie
2009	Come What May	Thema	
2010	The Company Men	Joyce Robertson	
2010	Ponies	Cashier	
2014	The David Dance	Mrs. P.	
2014	Every Secret Thing	Clarice	
2014	Time Out of Mind	Ms. Jackson	
2015	Jack of the Red Hearts	Miz	
2017	Roxanne Roxanne	Ms. Denise	
2018	A Vigilante	Beverly	
2020	Topside	Violet	
2023	Eileen	Mrs. Stevens	

=== Television ===
Year	Series	Role	Episodes
1996	New York Undercover	Mrs. Samuels	Episode 3.01: "A Time of Faith (Part 1)"
2000	Now and Again	Jimmy's Mom	Episode 1.17: "Boy Wonder"
2000, 2003, 2009–12; 2022	Law & Order: Special Victims Unit	Ann, Sally, Judge Maskin	9 episodes
2001	Deadline	Nurse Alice	Episode 1.08: "The Undesirables"
2003	Sex and the City	Ruby	Episode 6.11: "The Domino Effect"
2003	Hope & Faith	Receptionist	Episode 1.07: "Car Commercial"
2004	Law & Order	Feldman	Episode 14.11: "Darwinian"
2004	Monk	Woman on the Train	Episode 3.01: "Mr. Monk Takes Manhattan"
2005	Third Watch	Danielle	Episode 6.18: "Too Little Too Late"
2005–2008, 2011	Weeds	Heylia James	38 episodes
2006–2009	Handy Manny	Mrs. Thompson	Voice role
2008	Eli Stone	Judge Flora Simms	2 episodes
2009–12	One Life to Live	Phylicia Evans	Recurring; Beginning from September 10, 2009
2011	Curb Your Enthusiasm	Board Member #2	Episode 8.10: "Larry vs. Michael J. Fox"
2013	The Americans	Viola	Episodes 1.02: "The Clock" and 1.12: "The Oath"
2016	The Blacklist	Judy Sickler	Episode 3.14: "Lady Ambrosia"
2016	Elementary	Dolores Murphy	Episode 5.03: "Render, and Then Seize Her"
2017	Sneaky Pete	Libby Metzger	Episodes 1.02: "Safe" and 1.03: "Ms. Success"
2018	Younger	Akilah	Episode 5.07: "A Christmas Miracle"
2019	SMILF	Aunt Valerie	Episode 2.07: "Smile More if Lying Fails"
2019	Madam Secretary	Verline Grant	Episode 5.17: "The Common Defense"
2021–2023	FBI: Most Wanted	Susan Barnes	4 episodes
