= The Puritans (film) =

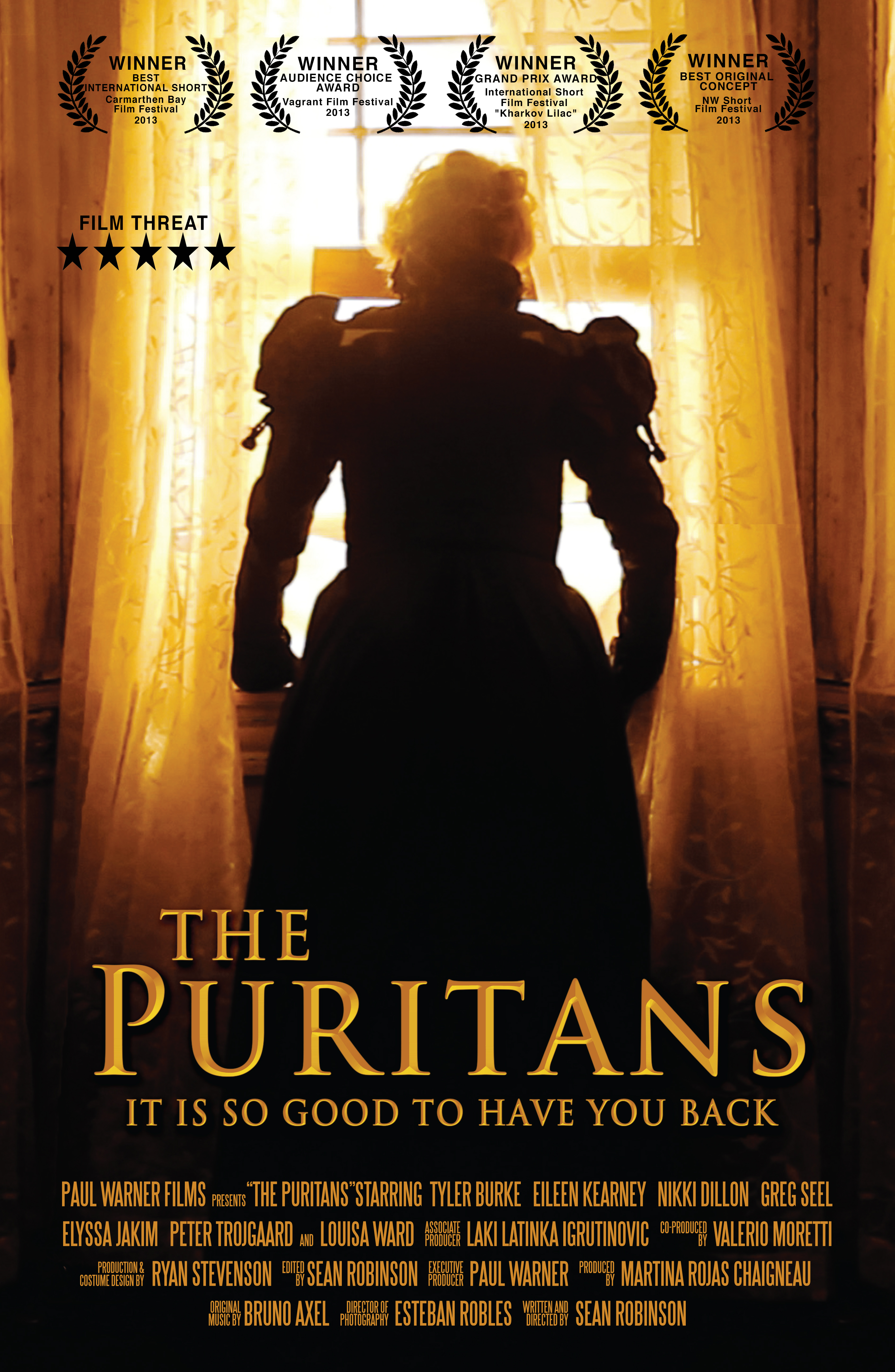
- Directed by: Sean Robinson
- Written by: Sean Robinson
- Produced by: Paul Warner, Martina Rojas Chaigneau
- Starring: Tyler Elliot Burke; Eileen Kearney; Nikki Dillon; Elyssa Jakim; Greg Seel; Louisa Ward; Peter Trojgaard
- Cinematography: Esteban Robles
- Edited by: Sean Robinson
- Music by: Bruno Axel
- Distributed by: SnagFilms; IndieFlix
- Release date: May 5, 2013
- Running time: 24 minutes
- Country: United States
- Language: English

The Puritans is a 2013 short science-fiction film written and directed by Sean Robinson and produced by Paul Warner.

== Premise ==
The Puritans revolves around a soldier who returns from a war to discover that his family has returned to a nineteenth-century life-style in a desperate attempt to escape from the "perversions" of the modern world.

== Cast ==
- Eileen Kearney as Joy Sutton
- Tyler Elliot Burke as Noble Sutton
- Nikki Dillon as Prudence Sutton
- Greg Seel as Ward Sutton
- Elyssa Jakim as Hope Dudley
- Louisa Ward as Julie
- Peter Trojgaard as Ernest Dudley

== Awards ==
- International Short Film Festival "Kharkov Lilac": Grand Prix Award-won (2013)
- Carmarthen Bay Film Festival: Best International Short-won (2013)
- NW Short Film Festival: Best Original Concept-won (2013)
- Vagrant Film Festival: Audience Choice Award-won (2013)
- Melbourne Underground Film Festival: Best Short Film-nominated (2013)
- The Northwest Ohio Film Festival: Outstanding Short Film-nominated, Audience Choice-nominated, Outstanding Direction: Sean Robinson-nominated, Outstanding Actress-Short: Eileen Kearney-nominated, Outstanding Screenplay: Paul Warner & Sean Robinson-nominated (2013)

== Festival showings ==
- Garden State Film Festival
- Naperville Independent Film Festival
- Marbella International Film Festival (Spain)
- Melbourne Underground Film Festival
- Long Island International Film Expo
- Naoussa International Film Festival
- The Rainier Independent Film Festival
- Frederick Film Festival
- San Francisco Frozen Film Festival
- Columbia Gorge International Film Festival
- Underexposed Film Festival YC
- Minneapolis Underground Film Festival
- Studio City Film Festival
- Timecode:NOLA Indie Film Fest
- Internacional de Cine Estudiantil
- The Inigo Film Festival
- The Justice Film Festival
- The Levante International Film Festival

== Critical reception ==
Film Threat gave the film 5 stars. SBCC Film Reviews
