= The David Dance =

2014 American Film

- Theatrical release poster
- Directed by: Aprill Winney
- Written by: Don Scimé
- Based on: The David Dance by Don Scimé
- Produced by: Don Scimé
- Starring: Don Scimé; Guy Adkins; Antoinette LaVecchia; Jordan Baker; Tonye Patano
- Cinematography: Ian McGlocklin
- Edited by: Erin Druez
- Music by: Marc Jackson
- Production company: Brave Lad Films
- Distributed by: Ryan Bruce Levey Film Distribution and PR Services
- Release dates: March 8, 2014 (Cinequest Film Festival); October 14, 2016 (United States)
- Running time: 108 minutes
- Country: United States
- Language: English

The David Dance is a 2014 American drama film, written and produced by Don Scimé and directed by Aprill Winney. It premiered at the Cinequest Film & Creativity Festival on March 8, 2014. The film stars Scimé as David, the host of a gay radio show in Buffalo, New York, who struggles with self-doubt when his single sister Kate (Antoinette LaVecchia), asks him to be the father figure for her soon-to-be adopted Brazilian child. The cast also includes Guy Adkins (as Chris), Jordan Baker (as June) and Tonye Patano (as Mrs. P.).

The film was released theatrically on October 14, 2016 and on Amazon Prime Video in April 2018. It received the audience award for Best Feature Film at the Tallgrass Film Festival and the jury award for Best Feature Film at the Long Island International Film Expo among others. At its screening at the Miami Gay and Lesbian Film Festival, Scott Douglas in Edge Media Network wrote: "Once I reached the end I was overwhelmed with all different kinds of emotions and plenty of tears. Truly one of those movies that gets to the heart and soul of a person. If you have ever felt love of any kind, this movie is for you. 'The David Dance' is the surprise of the LGBT circuit." Kevin Thomas of Progressive Pulse called the film “A gem of a movie.” Emille Black in Cinema Crazed called the film "a personal and touching family drama. Well crafted with characters the viewers care about." In 2020 the film was listed as one of seven "queer hidden gems" The screenplay is part of the permanent core collection of the Margaret Herrick Library (library of the Academy of Motion Picture Arts and Sciences).

The film is based on Scimé's stage play of the same name, which premiered in New York City at the 2003 New York International Fringe Festival and in 2006 in Washington, DC.

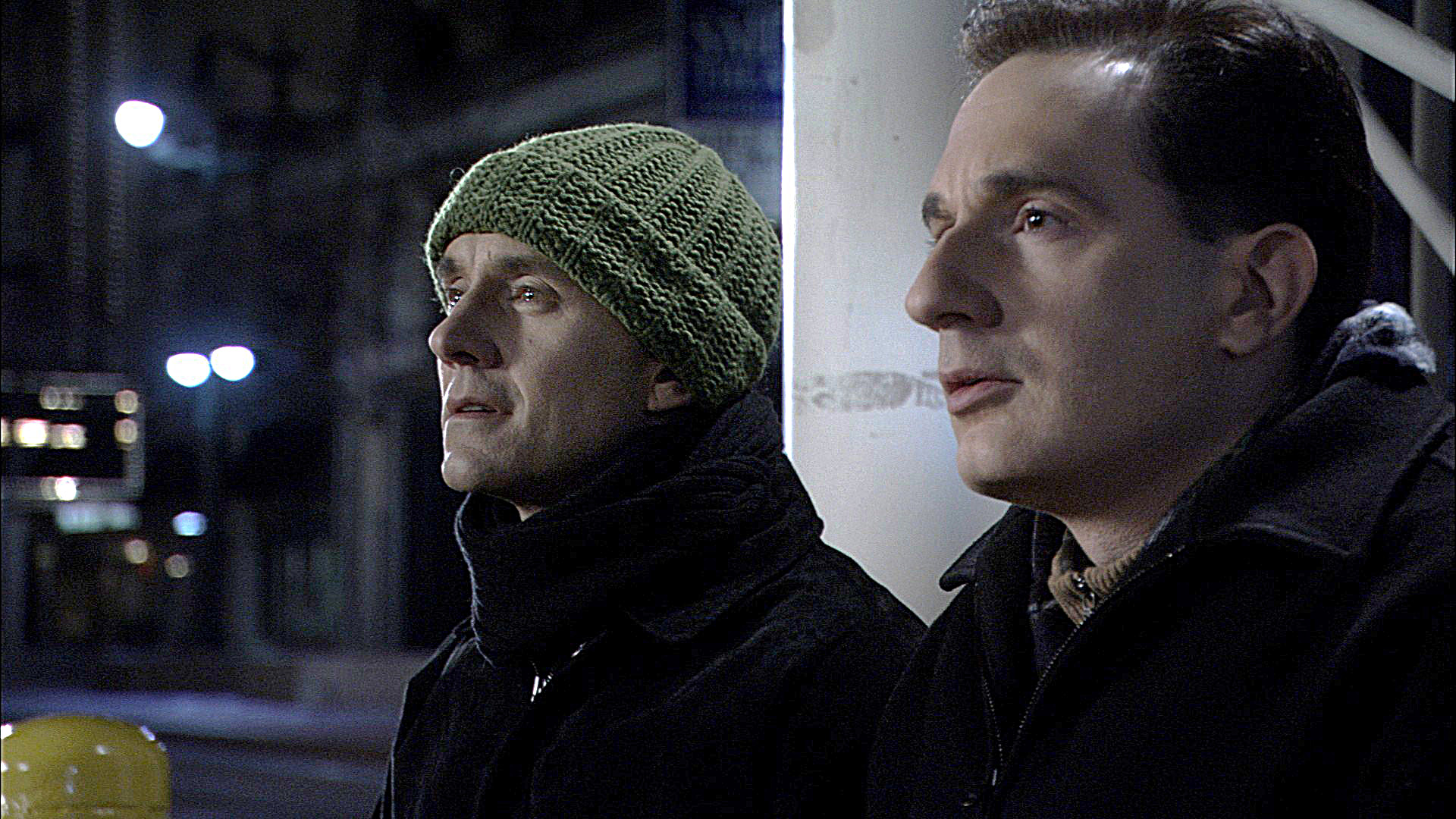
Guy Adkins and Don Scimé in "The David Dance"

== Plot ==
David is the host of a local, late night radio show called "Gay Talk" in Buffalo, New York. When he is away from the microphone, he's shy and unsure of himself. But as "Danger Dave", his on-air alias, he's confidant and every listener's friend. He and his sister Kate, a thrice divorced banker with a yen for classical music and cats, are bonded by a secret, yet vast sense of inadequacy. Kate announces to David that she has decided to adopt an orphan in Brazil and asks him to be a father figure. David grapples with his self-doubts while also grappling on-air with a conservative radio host named June. Chris, an amiable coworker and a romantic interest from his past, challenges David to come to terms with his insecurities. David's past and present intertwine as he learns to love and accept himself.

== Cast ==
- Don Scimé as David
- Guy Adkins as Chris
- Antoinette LaVecchia as Kate
- Jordan Baker as June
- Tonye Patano as Mrs. P.
- JuJu Stulbach as Young Nun
- Lauren Lopes as Margaret

== Accolades ==
Event Body	Year	Award	Recipient	Result	Ref
Tallgrass Film Festival	2014	Vimeo Audience Award Narrative Feature	The David Dance	Won	
Long Island Gay and Lesbian Film Festival	2014	Best Men's Feature	The David Dance	Won	
Woods Hole Film Festival	2014	Best Narrative Feature Film	The David Dance	Nominated	
SoHo International Film Festival	2015	Best Showcase Feature Film	The David Dance	Nominated	
New Hope Film Festival	2015	Best Picture	The David Dance	Won	
New Hope Film Festival	2015	LGBT Spirit Award	The David Dance	Won	
New Hope Film Festival	2015	Best Director	Aprill Winney	Won	
Long Island International Film Expo	2016	Best Feature Film	The David Dance	Won	
SENE Film, Music and Art Festival	2016	Jury Award, Best Feature Film	The David Dance	Won	
SENE Film, Music and Art Festival	2016	Audience Award, Best Feature Film	The David Dance	Won	
Northern Virginia International Film and Music Festival	2016	Best LGBT Film	The David Dance	Won	
Northern Virginia International Film and Music Festival	2016	Best Screenplay Feature Film	Don Scimé	Won	
Northern Virginia International Film and Music Festival	2016	Best Supporting Actress Feature Film	Antoinette LaVecchia	Won	
Northern Virginia International Film and Music Festival	2016	Best Editing - Feature Film	Erin Druez	Won	
Northern Virginia International Film and Music Festival	2016	Best Actor - Feature Film	Don Scimé	Nominated	
Northern Virginia International Film and Music Festival	2016	Best Director - Feature Film	Aprill Winney	Nominated	
Wild Rose Independent Film Festival	2016	Distinctive Achievement Award, Best Feature Film	The David Dance	Won	
Wild Rose Independent Film Festival	2016	Distinctive Achievement Award, Best Director	Aprill Winney	Won	
Wild Rose Independent Film Festival	2016	Distinctive Achievement Award, Actress	Antoinette LaVecchia	Won	
Wild Rose Independent Film Festival	2016	Distinctive Achievement Award, Actor	Don Scimé	Won	
Wild Rose Independent Film Festival	2016	Distinctive Achievement Award, Screenplay - Feature Film	Don Scimé	Won	
Wild Rose Independent Film Festival	2016	Distinctive Achievement Award, Cinematography - Feature Film	Ian McGlocklin	Won	
Wild Rose Independent Film Festival	2016	Distinctive Achievement Award, Ensemble Casting	Brette Goldstein	Won	
Wild Rose Independent Film Festival	2016	Distinctive Achievement Award, Music	Marc Jackson	Won	
