= I Love Her (film) =

2013 Ukrainian short film

- Film poster
- Ukrainian: Я її люблю
- Directed by: Darya Perelay
- Written by: Darya Perelay
- Starring: Natalie Ivanchuk; Frau Hanna
- Cinematography: Sergey Marinchak
- Release dates: 18 October 2013 (Germany); 7 March 2014 (Ukraine)
- Running time: 4 minutes
- Country: Ukraine
- Language: Russian

I Love Her (Ukrainian: «Я її люблю», romanized: Ya yii liubliu) is a 2013 Ukrainian drama short film directed by Darya Perelay. It is the first Ukrainian movie about a lesbian relationship and is one of the first LGBT films produced in Ukraine.

I Love Her was first screened on 18 October 2013 at the Lesbisch Schwule Filmtage Hamburg festival in Germany; followed by the Festival Internacional de Cinema Gai i Lèsbic de Barcelona on 25 October 2013; FACE à FACE in the Courage section of the Short Films International Competition on 29 November 2013; and the Festival Internacional de Cine por los Derechos Humanos Bogotá in December 2013 as an Official Selection in the International Short Film Competition. In Ukraine, it was screened on 7 March 2014 at Zovten Cinema in Kyiv. The film was screened in Europe, Asia, Canada and the United States, totaling 23 countries.

== Plot ==
A young musician and songwriter, Nataly, moves to Kyiv with dreams of being discovered and finding fame. While performing on the street she meets a deaf-mute young woman, Anna, and the two are drawn to each other. Together they defy the nation's restrictions against homosexuality.

== Cast ==
- Natalie Ivanchuk as Nataly
- Frau Hanna as Anna

== I Love Her 2017 feature film ==
The 2017 feature version based on the short film was funded by the Barcelona Film Commission of the Generalitat de Catalunya; and produced by Cosmo Films and Afilm Productions.

The 92-minute film is written, directed, and edited by Perelay; with Elena Lombao as cinematographer, and music composed by Olexii Ivanenko. Anuar Doss, Mikhail Chernikov, and Darya Perelay are the producers. It is set in Barcelona with the dialogue in English. Natalie Ivanchuk reprised the role of "Natalie". The feature film's tragic ending differs from the original short.

I Love Her (2017) screened at the Gay Film Nights International Film Festival in Romania on 18 November 2017. The feature film became available on Amazon Prime Video on 16 May 2019.

=== Cast ===
- Natalie Ivanchuk as Natalie
- Clare Durant as Anna
- Alix Gentil as Julia
- Eudald Font as David

== Bechdel Project ==
I Love Her is part of the Ukrainian "Bechdel Project" which consists of eight movies. The test asks if a work of fiction features at least two women who talk to each other about something other than a man.

== See also ==
- List of LGBT-related films directed by women
- List of independent short films
