= A Crime Across Four Landscapes =

2026 American experimental mystery short film

- Directed by: Aidan Weaver
- Written by: Aidan Weaver; William Christopher Stephens
- Produced by: Katie Sanderson; Aidan Weaver
- Starring: Alphie Hyorth; Rohan Myers; Jason Kierce
- Cinematography: Jared Freeman
- Edited by: Aidan Weaver
- Music by: Aidan Weaver
- Release date: 2026
- Running time: 6 minutes
- Country: United States
- Language: English

A Crime Across Four Landscapes is a 2026 American experimental mystery short film directed by Aidan Weaver, who co-wrote it with William Christopher Stephens. The film follows the aftermath of a crime in a small town in the American South.

The film premiered in the Shorts: Think Fast programme at the Tribeca Festival.

== Plot ==
Set in the American South, the film follows a crime in a small town through evidence scattered across four landscapes.

== Cast ==
- Alphie Hyorth
- Rohan Myers
- Jason Kierce

== Production and release ==
A Crime Across Four Landscapes was directed and co-written by Aidan Weaver. Weaver developed the project around locations and atmosphere before establishing its narrative, aiming to experiment with film form and structure. The film uses a fragmented narrative, repeatedly returning to familiar locations with changes that gradually reveal details of the central crime.

A Crime Across Four Landscapes premiered at the 2026 Tribeca Film Festival. It was also screened as part of the Shorts Program: After Dark at the AFI FEST. The film received the Vimeo Staff Pick Award at the 2026 Palm Springs International ShortFest. It also won the Best Narrative Short award at the 2026 Coronado Island Film Festival.

== Awards and nominations ==
Year	Award	Category	Result
2026	Palm Springs International ShortFest		Won
2026	Coronado Island Film Festival	Best Narrative Short	Won
