= Naked (2013 film) =

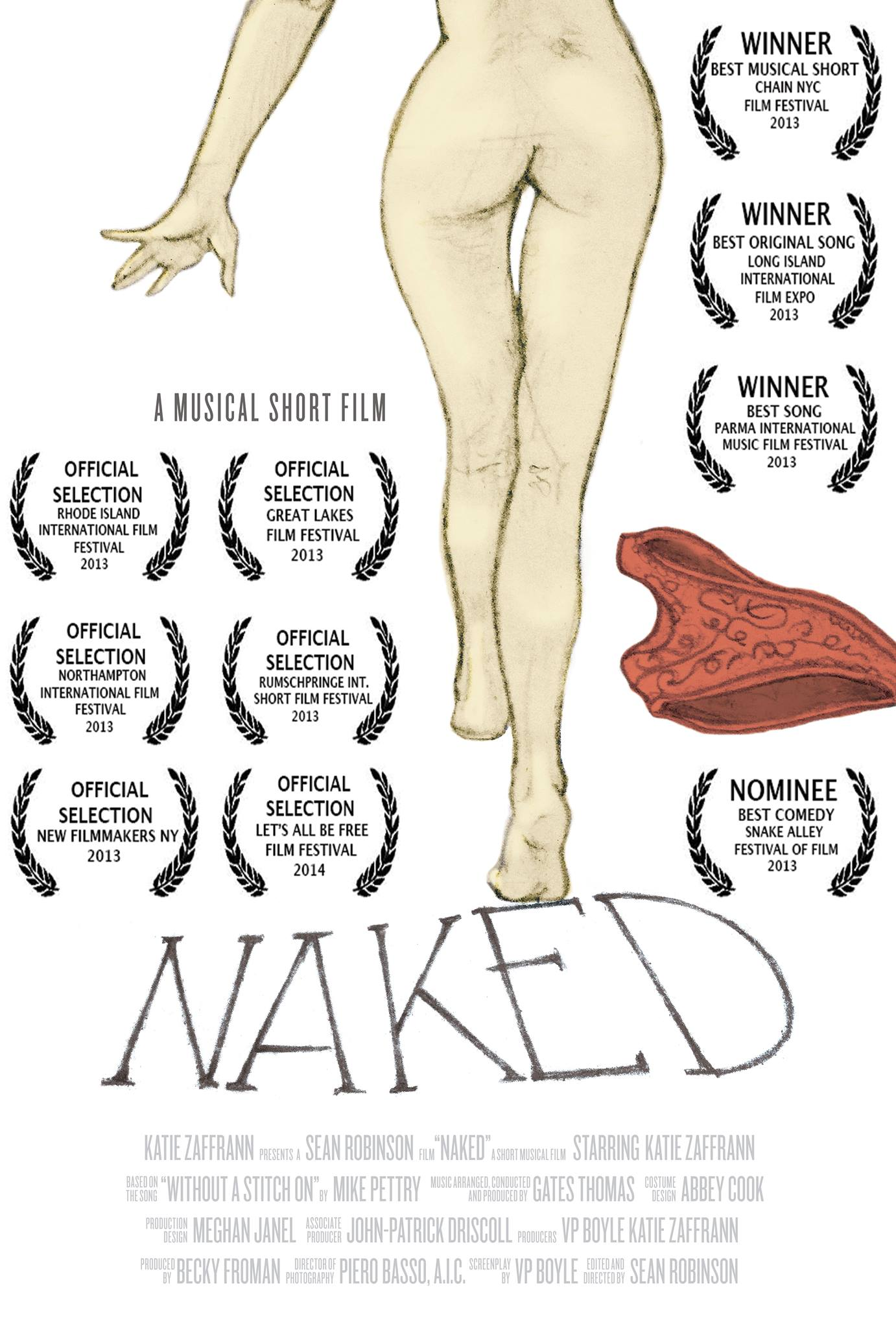
- Directed by: Sean Robinson
- Written by: VP Boyle
- Produced by: VP Boyle; Becky Froman
- Starring: Katie Zaffrann
- Cinematography: Piero Basso
- Edited by: Sean Robinson
- Music by: Mike Pettry
- Release date: June 1, 2013
- Running time: 11 minutes
- Country: United States
- Language: English

Naked is a short musical film directed by Sean Robinson and written by VP Boyle. It is based on the song "Without a Stitch On" by Mike Pettry, and was first shown at the Rhode Island International Film Festival in 2013. It stars Katie Zaffrann.

== Cast ==
- Katie Zaffrann as The Girl
- Claude Kerven as Mr. Wright
- Amy Blackman as Susan
- Matthew Schatz as Matt

== Reception ==
- Parma International Music Film Festival: Best Song (won-2013)
- Long Island International Film Expo: Best Original Song (won-2013)
- Chain NYC Film Festival: Best Musical Short (won-2013)
- Snake Alley Festival of Film: Best Comedy (nominated-2013)

Film Threat gave the film 3 stars.
