= Shabbat Dinner =

- Directed by: Michael Morgenstern
- Written by: Michael Morgenstern
- Cinematography: Kristopher Layng
- Edited by: Michael Morgenstern
- Music by: Gerardo Giraldo
- Release date: 2012
- Running time: 14 min.
- Country: United States
- Language: English

Shabbat Dinner is a short 2012 film written, directed, and edited by Michael Morgenstern. It was released on YouTube in January 2014. It is an ensemble piece that tells the story of two closeted gay teenagers whose families get together for Shabbat Dinner. After dinner, and unbeknownst to their parents, the two boys reveal their sexuality to each other.

== Plot ==
The film follows a Shabbat dinner party between two young families. After a dinner of superficial conversation between the adults, two teenaged boys William (Chris London) and Virgo (Dan Shaked) go to William's room. Virgo reveals to William he is gay, and William insists he is straight. Outside, their parents talk about religion, William's father exclaiming that all good Jews should marry Jewish and keep kosher. Back in William's room the sexual tension is building, and William leans in to kiss Virgo. Soon, the teenagers hear their parents calling, and they struggle to get their clothes on before being found out. William's father opens the door to the room. There's a quick cut to the families saying goodbye at the door, as William looks anxiously at his father looking sourly at the floor.

== Cast ==
- Chris London as William Shore
- Dan Shaked as Virgo Bernstein-Cohen
- Eva Kaminsky as Rebecca Shore
- Michael Wikes as Arnold Shore
- Peter Tedeschi as David Bernstein-Cohen
- Dawn Yanek as Susan Bernstein-Cohen

== Recognition ==
Shabbat Dinner premiered in March 2012 at the Hong Kong International Film Festival and has been screened in 55 film festivals worldwide. It won the following awards:

- Audience Choice Award, Zero Film Festival
- Crystal Cactus, Best Gay Film, Out in the Desert Film Festival
- Audience Choice Award, Barcelona International Gay & Lesbian Film Festival
- Audience Choice Award, 2nd place, Miami Gay & Lesbian Film Festival
- Best Comedy, Amsterdam Gay & Lesbian Film Festival
