= A Sense of Entitlement =

2000 short film by Mark L. Feinsod

- Directed by: Mark L. Feinsod
- Written by: Mark L. Feinsod
- Produced by: Scott J. Kemper
- Starring: Nicole Severine; Rike Scholle
- Cinematography: Ola Brattās
- Edited by: Ray Burris
- Release date: March 28, 2000
- Country: United States
- Language: English

A Sense Of Entitlement is a short film directed by Mark L. Feinsod and starring Nicole Severine and Rike Scholle.

== Plot ==
The film tells the story of two sisters, Caroline and Jessica, after their father calls Jessica and informs her that he will no longer finance their expensive New York lifestyle. Each sister reacts in different ways: Jessica must figure out how to continue her art studies and whether to move to France with her boyfriend Albert, while Caroline prostitutes herself to two investment bankers. When the girls' father, Mr. Blaine, arrives in town accompanied by his bodyguard/assistant Benton, Albert, who had come to Jessica's apartment to surprise her, is accidentally shot when he is mistaken for somebody who has been sending death threats to Mr. Blaine.

== Production ==
Shot in 1999 and completed in 2000, the movie was shot on Super-16mm film and blown up to 35mm.

A Sense of Entitlement stars Rike Scholle as Caroline, Nicole Severine as Jessica, David Kampman as Mr. Blaine, and Stanislas Verspyck as Albert. It was written and directed by Mark L. Feinsod. Music used in the soundtrack for the film was written by Vincent James.
