= Don't Go Tellin' Your Momma =

- Poster
- Directed by: Topaz Jones; Simon Davis; Jason Sondock
- Written by: Topaz Jones; Simon Davis; Jason Sondock
- Produced by: Julien Berlan; Patrick Milling Smith
- Starring: Topaz Jones
- Edited by: J.M. Harper
- Music by: Topaz Jones
- Production companies: SMUGGLER; BWGTBLD; Frenzy
- Release date: January 28, 2021 (Sundance)
- Running time: 34 minutes
- Country: United States
- Language: English

Don't Go Tellin’ Your Momma is an American short film directed by rapper and singer Topaz Jones, in collaboration with filmmaking duo Jason Sondock and Simon Davis, who are known professionally as rubberband. It is a pseudo-documentary that consists of 26 vignettes each loosely connected by experiences in Jones’ youth, and includes home-video footage, interviews, and surrealist sketches.

It premiered on January 28, 2021, at the 2021 Sundance Film Festival, where it won the Short Film Jury Award: Nonfiction. It later saw a wide release on September 14, 2021, as part of the New York Times’ online Op-Doc series.

The film’s soundtrack is composed of songs from Jones’ accompanying visual album of the same name.

== Summary ==
Don't Go Tellin’ Your Momma is an opinionated documentary developed by Topaz Jones. The film begins with photographs and several stills that depict who Topaz Jones is. As the film continues, the audience is presented with the first letter of the alphabet, “A is for amphetamines.” Jones’ film is inspired by The Black ABC's that were established in the 1970s. The original cards and posters were used to mirror and relate to the lives of Black children. Jones pays homage by following a similar structure throughout the film. He presents the letters of the alphabet and relates them to his personal experience. The film serves as a commentary on Black American cultural consciousness.

== Plot ==
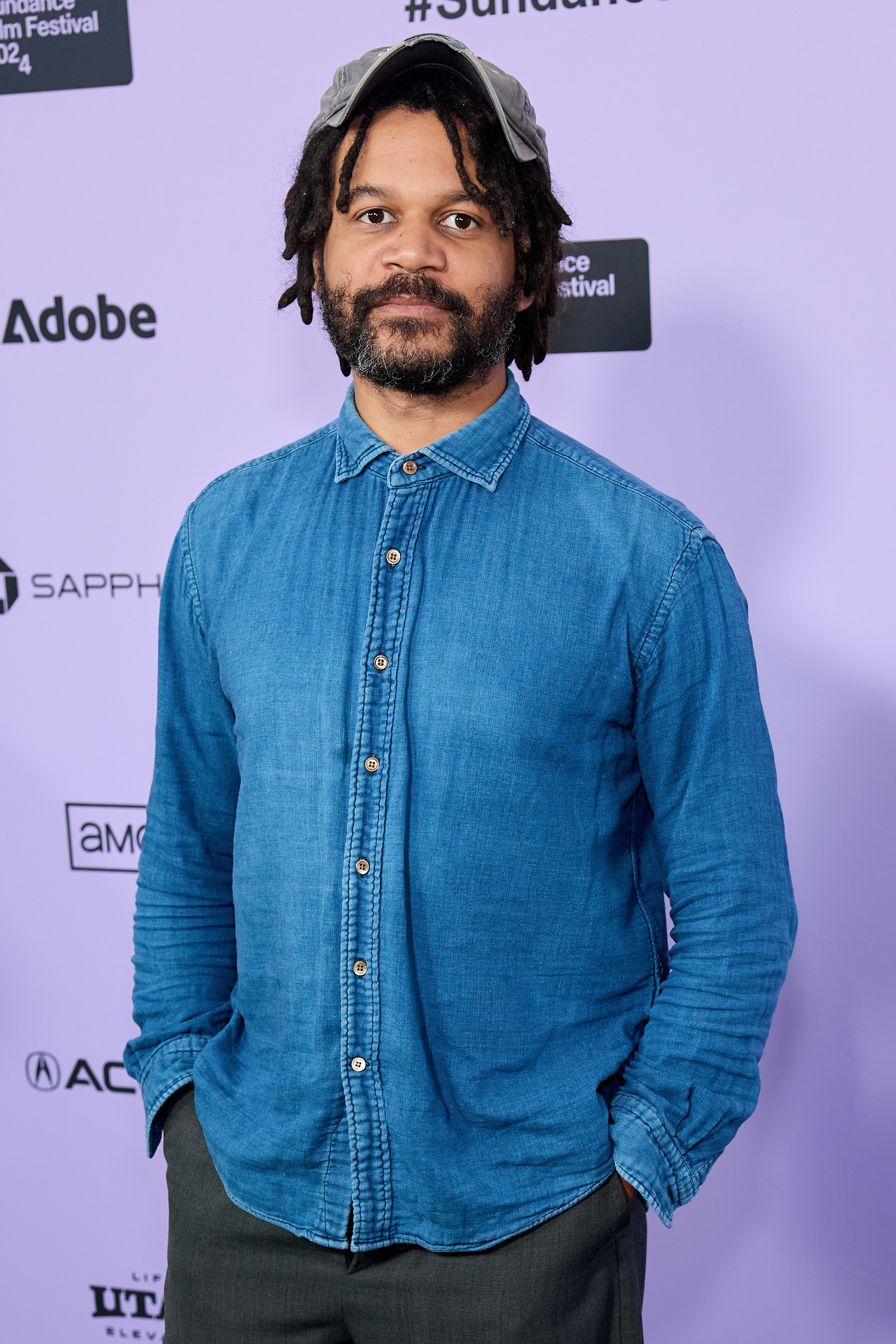
Editor J.M. Harper

Each letter of the alphabet is represented with short vignettes introduced by title cards:

- A is for Amphetamines: a short clip of a man floating in the middle of the room on drugs.
- B is for Blue: starts with a clip of a man sitting and listening to music with headphones, then transitions into a video of a group of kids in a black community playing basketball and all saying their basketball names.
- C is for Code Switching: Kid getting ready for school, putting on a cross chain under his shirt, and then putting on his Nike shoes and making sure they are clean.
- D is for Drums: A scene of a guy drumming on a table as another guy creates a rap to go with the beat. Then goes into a scene of a middle age women
- E is for Education: A video with an interview with Rodney Jackson, a middle school teacher in Montclair, NJ, talking about how he had to educate himself because the way the school system teaches are wrong. Talking about how school systems put limitations one how people choose to struggle and the way they talk about slavery should be changed. Then goes into a video of a family gathering during Christmas, full of laughter and joy.
- F is for Family: A video of an interview with a woman talking about after a Motown rehearsal her and her sisters were going to go eat and then go bowling but where they are from they are not allowed to go bowling so it was their first time.
- G is for Garden: A video of an urban farm worker and community organizer talking about affordable fresh food for the community is important and learning how to locally grow, instead of supporting companies that bring food from all over the world when they are not considered fresh by the time they arrive.
- H is for Herringbone: A video clip of a kid running up to the camera smiling and then someone snatches his chain. Then transitions into a short two second clip of a kid singing at a graduation.
- I is for Intellectual Property: Tariq Luqmaan Trotter, also known as the American rapper and lyricist Black Thought, talks about his experiences and struggles with the concept of intellectual property. He goes into detail about the advice he would give younger or especially vulnerable people, in which he shares that their biggest priority should be to establish and maintain ownership of their original creations. After cuts to different clips of black artists and their artwork being produced.
- J is for Jealousy: Two individuals are lying in bed asleep, when another person is seen sitting in the corner of the room on their phone, looking up to glance at the two in bed as they move closer together.
- K is for Karma: A man knocks over a tower of dominos, and after the last piece stands a small, shrunken man, who is knocked over after being hit with the final domino. The next clip shows musicians Curt Jones and Starleana Young from the group Aurra, performing the song “You and Me Tonight.”
- L is for Language: Taylor C. McLendon, also known as American rapper and producer Ivy Sole, talks about the importance of language to them and how it connects to assertion in the world and ability to share stories, which is important in their artistic career. They go into detail about the concept of code-switching, describing some experiences as a Black person that are both personal and universal. Sole also celebrates the different dictions and new dialects of Black voices.
- M is for Mirror: A broken mirror is displayed with many reflections of the same person staring at his reflection, and in the background plays a quote about self-identity. A video camera clip plays next, showing a busy street and three individuals standing side by side. The clip ends when the camera pans to the floor and a yell from the background is heard.
- N is for Nappy: Four people sit on a staircase in each other's laps, doing the hair of the person in front of them. The person in the beginning of the chain stares off into the distance blankly as the person behind him works on his hair.
- O is for Organize: The first clip shows a gathering of many Black men holding signs that read “I AM A MAN.” Lawyer and activist Keith White is interviewed in the next clip, talking about his experiences in unfamiliar and predominately White spaces, specifically his time spent at law school. He mentions the killing of Amadou Diallo and how at the time of his murder, he felt the need to address the issue when nobody else seemed to be speaking up on it. Keith picks up on the significance of relationships within Black communities, and how important it is that members build up each other, as opposed to being against one another. The video cuts to a man doing pushups while rapping on the side of a street.
- P is for Playfight: Men are preparing to fight in a boxing rink that is set up outside, and surrounded by children who cheer them on from behind a wired fence. A boxer gets up and is in a ready stance to fight, though gets swung at and knocked out by another person, whose arm is the only body part that is in perspective.
- Q is for Questions: The angle of the video is towards the sky, where six different children make their way into the frame where they are positioned to be staring down at the camera that is not in sight. What they stare at is not known to the viewer, though the children are curious about what it is they are looking at and ask questions such as, “Do you think he’s real?” They are not hung up on their curiosity and all exit the frame at the same time.
- R is for Rich: There is a video that shows how African Americans are hesitant to do business because they think they can negotiate a more favorable offer however their negation backfired and now they have to face the consequences of losing that financial opportunity.
- S is for Sourbelts: Sourbelts are a candy, and they all seem to just be eating them with their friends.
- T is for Time: Kids are just sitting and waiting as time goes by.
- U is for Underground: Being hidden, Lowkey.
- V is for Vulnerable: There is an interview about a therapist feeling honored for people opening up to her.
- W is for Worldstar: Shows a lot of videos of fighting and overall violence.
- X is for Xerox: It interprets Xerox as generations as a mother's son has a son and their daughter has a daughter. It overall shows a family reunion.
- Y is for Yard: It shows a yard sale, and when someone wants to purchase something, the owner just lets them take it for free and the guy continues to mow the lawn in his yard.
- Z is for Zipcode: The video shows them representing their hometown and are proud to show how and where they were raised. They are overall proud of where they came from.

== Background ==
Topaz Jones’ creative partnership with Jason Sondock and Simon Davis (rubberband.) began when they met in college sometime around 2011.

Discussion surrounding the creation of Don't Go Tellin’ Your Momma began while Jones was in the process of mixing his third studio album of the same name, using the album as inspiration for the film's visuals and themes. Much of its early production took place during the height of the COVID-19 pandemic and the beginnings of the George Floyd protests, which Jones quotes as having greatly affected the developmental process of the film.

== Inspiration and influence ==
The film was inspired by Jones’ experiences growing up in Montclair, New Jersey, drawing on his upbringing as a way of illustrating the African American experience. Jones uses himself as an example of the complex relationship African American youths face with personal identity, and he produced the film to promote the visibility of their struggle.

The vignette style of the film was inspired by the “Black ABCs," a series of posters created in 1970 by the Society for Visual Education of the University of Chicago. They were designed to empower African American students with a learning resource that reflected them and their cultural identities in a time when most learning resources were designed only for the dominant white population. Jones borrows the format of the "Black ABCs" in this short film, translating its contents to the screen and for a modern audience.

Jones was inspired by the TV series The Wire to showcase the messages advertised to African American youths outside of the classroom.

Sondock cites the TV show Atlanta and the 2012 film An Oversimplification of Her Beauty by Terence Nance as inspiration for the elements of magical realism present within the film.
