= 12 Kilometers =

2016 film by Mike Pecci

- Poster
- Directed by: Mike Pecci
- Written by: Mike Pecci
- Produced by: Mike Pecci
- Starring: Ara Woland; Ernst Zorin; Pavel Shatu; Svetlana Orlova; Gene Ravvin; Paul Caldera
- Cinematography: David Kruta
- Edited by: Mike Pecci
- Music by: Michael Francis Tran
- Release date: April 16, 2016 (Boston International Film Festival)
- Running time: 33 minutes
- Country: United States
- Language: Russian
- Budget: $50,000

12 Kilometers, also known as 12KM, is a 2016 American science fiction horror short film written and directed by Mike Pecci. It stars Ara Woland, Ernst Zorin, and Pavel Shatu. It is inspired by the drilling of the Kola Borehole.

== Synopsis ==
A drilling team at the Kola Borehole uncovers a terrifying entity.

== Cast ==
- Ara Woland as Eduard
- Ernst Zorin as Professor Mihailov
- Pavel Shatu as Danil
- Svetlana Orlova as Annushka
- Gene Ravvin as Main Drill Worker
- Paul Caldera as Eduard's Father

== Production ==
The film was inspired by Pecci's own experience after a near-fatal accident at the Boston Frog Pond. He cited The Thing, Alien, The Birds, Dreamscape, and Godzilla as influences and it was funded through Kickstarter.

== Release ==
12 Kilometers premiered at Boston International Film Festival on April 16, 2016. Pecci marketed the film by making viewers ask him for permission to watch it.

== Reception ==
Michele Galgana at Screen Anarchy said it is a "masterful blend of sci-fi, horror, and surrealism." Jim Morazzini at Voices from the Balcony scored the film 4 out of 5 stars and said it is "something like we might have gotten if David Lynch had directed The Thing." Will Harrison at The Unheard Nerd praised the acting. Ara Woland won the Indie Soul Best Actor award at Boston International Film Festival.

== See also ==
- 10 Cloverfield Lane
- Death Line
- Friend of the World
- Harbinger Down
- What Daphne Saw
