= Corey Blake =

American entrepreneur and writer

- Education: Millikin University (BFA)
- Occupation: CEO of Round Table Press

Corey Blake is an American entrepreneur, storyteller and former actor and filmmaker. He has released graphic novel translations of popular book titles. Blake founded and ran the nonprofit organization known as The From the Barrio Foundation, which "committed to using author Robert Renteria’s life, business experience, and role as a civic leader to help eliminate conditions that foster violence, delinquency, drugs, and gangs." In order to produce his comic books, Blake has established a publishing house, based in Highland Park, Illinois known as Writers of the Round Table Press, which has produced renditions of The Long Tail and The Art of War, among others, including Shut Up, Stop Whining, & Get a Life, Overachievement, How to Master the Art of Selling and Mi Barrio. These books are widely used in the educational sector, as well as in youth prisons. The authors of these books "all agreed to exchange rights for a token $100 each, in return for royalty payments of as much as 20% of Round Table’s take", according to Forbes. The comic book versions of the titles are available at major bookstores such as Barnes & Noble, Indigo Books and Music; the publications are also released in digital format, for devices such as iPhones, as well as BlackBerry and Android devices. Blake's motivation for format translation stems from his interest in attracting busy professionals and a new generation of readers who prefer to be entertained as they are educated. In the education sector, Corey Blake has organized the delineation of the United States Constitution, as well as its ratification process in a work titled United States Constitution: A Graphic Adaptation. Kate Kelly noted that in the text, Blake's company "included women as part of the process that looks to the future. A female in period clothes is used to depict several of the explanations concerning the power of the Constitution, and women are represented in the sections that address Congress and its responsibilities. In May 2013, Corey Blake has also launched the production of a publication, aimed at the fifth grade standard, known as The Crusaders, a "comic that use[d] real-life authors as super heroes to help kids face challenges." Blake has also pictorialized the story of Riley Weinstein, a teenage girl who has "survived nearly 20 brain surgeries, five strokes and paralysis."

Prior to his work in publishing, Blake was an actor who costarred and guest starred on Buffy the Vampire Slayer, The Shield, Fastlane, and Joan of Arcadia among other shows. Short Films he produced and directed won awards at the San Diego Film Festival, Worldfest Houston, and the George Sidney Independent Film Competition. He starred in commercials for Mountain Dew, Mitsubishi, and American Express, among others. His appearance in “Coverage” for Yard Fitness earned producers a Belding, Bronze Lion, London International Advertising Award, and an Adforum Creative Hit Award; the commercial was featured on ABC's “World’s Greatest Commercials.”

== See also ==
- CliffsNotes
