= Bertha Rogers Borehole =

Oil-exploratory borehole in Washita County, Oklahoma, United States

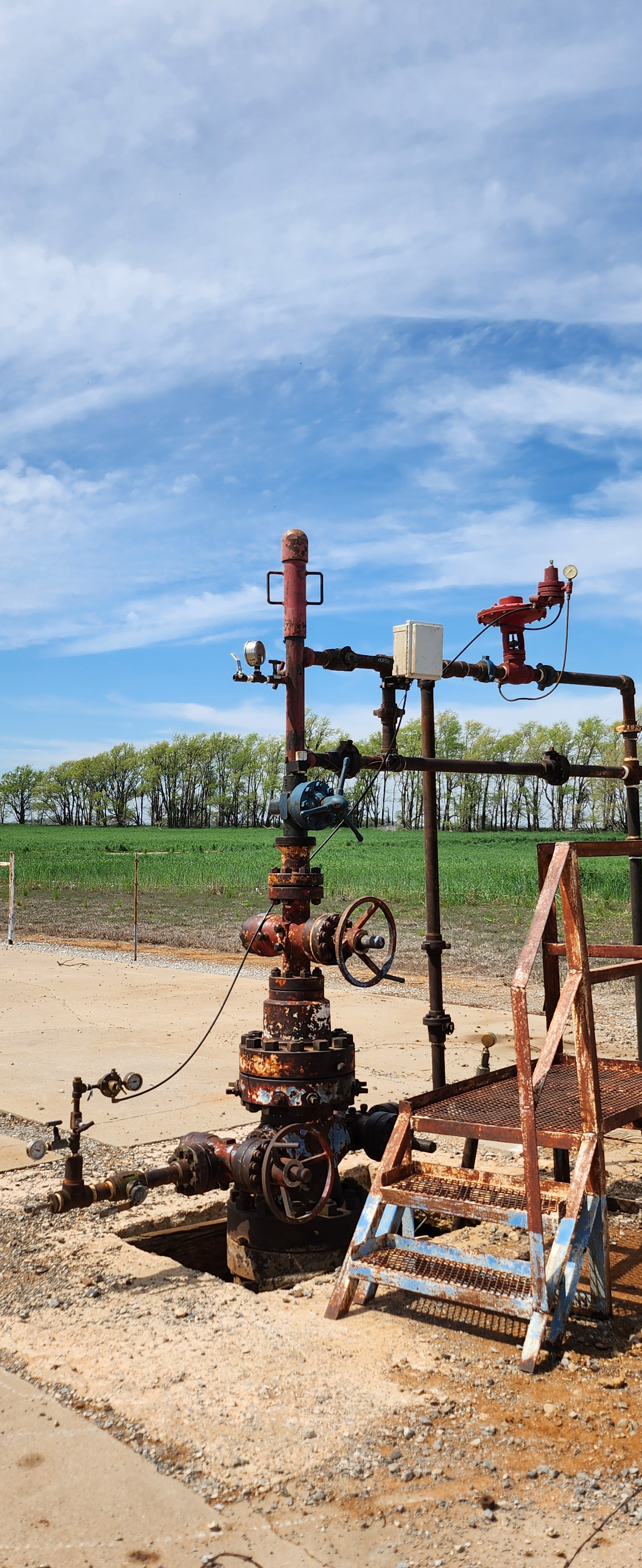
- Bertha Rogers Borehole superstructure, March 2024
- Interactive map of Bertha Rogers Borehole
- Location: Burns Flat, Dill City, Oklahoma, US, Oklahoma, US; 35.31547°N 99.19251°W
- Products: Natural Gas
- Type: Gas Well
- Greatest depth: 31,441 feet (9,583 m)
- Opened: 1974
- Closed: 1997
- Company: Lone Star Producing Company

The Bertha Rogers Borehole is a former natural gas well in Burns Flat, Dill City, Oklahoma, US. Today plugged and abandoned, it was originally drilled by the Lone Star Producing Company as its oil-exploratory hole number 1–27 between October 25, 1972, and April 13, 1974, reaching a then world record terminal depth of 31,441 feet (5.9547 mi; 9,583 m).

During drilling, the well encountered enormous pressure – almost 25,000 psi (172,369 kPa). No commercial hydrocarbons were found before drilling hit a molten sulfur deposit, which solidified around the drill string, causing the drill pipe to twist-off and a loss of the bottom-hole assembly. The well was plugged back and completed in the Granite Wash from 11,000 to 13,200 feet (3,400 to 4,000 m) as a natural gas producer.

According to publicly available well records from the Oklahoma Corporation Commission, the Bertha Rogers hole ceased production of natural gas in July 1997.

The Bertha Rogers hole was surpassed in 1979 by the Kola Superdeep Borehole dug by the USSR, which reached 12,262 metres (40,230 ft; 7.619 mi) in 1989 and remains the deepest human-made hole on Earth as of 2026.
