= Adventures of Malia =

- Directed by: Shubhavi Arya
- Written by: Shubhavi Arya
- Produced by: Shubhavi Arya
- Release date: 21 March 2015 (School Daze Movie Fest)
- Running time: 12 minutes
- Country: India
- Language: English

Adventures of Malia is a 2015 independent animation short film directed, animated and written by Shubhavi Arya. The film was completed by Shubhavi Arya at the age of 16 years.

Adventures of Malia held its US premiere on 21 March 2015 at the School Daze Movie Fest in Oregon. As of November 2015, it has been accepted in competition by more than 30 international film festivals including the 51st Chicago International Film Festival, the 2015 Arlington International Film Festival and the ENIMATION Little Elephant - International Children and Youth Film Festival. The film got nominated for 11 international film awards, winning 3 of them including the Honorary Mention Foreign Film Award at the ColorTape International Film Festival, Australia and Best Under 18 Filmmaker at the Global Independent Film Awards, United States.

== Plot ==
In order to save her home from rampant pollution, a little girl goes in search of a magical spell and transforms into a mermaid.

== Development ==
After Shubhavi Arya worked as an animator at the age of 12 years in the short film "ZAP" and received critical acclaim at numerous international film festivals including Viborg Animation Festival, Denmark and Golden Snail International Animation Film Festival, Serbia, she set about developing her own material for her own next project. After an unusually long development period, the film was completed by Shubhavi Arya in February 2015 at the age of 16 years. The trailer of the film was released online on 11 February 2015. Adventures of Malia is created using cutout and stop-motion animation techniques.

== Critical reception and reviews ==
The film gained national and international recognition. The film has received mostly rave reviews. Jury members from the CINE Golden Eagle Awards noted "There are some fantastic details captured in this stop motion. The sound design really adds to the visual environment. This is very impressive for a 16-year-old!" and "Amazing talent. Great use of sound". Rock and Roll Film Festival 2015, Kenya agrees by saying "16-year-old, Shubhavi Arya, shows great promise as she writes, directs and animates "The Adventures of Malia". If she carries on like this, it won't be long before she is winning a lot of awards for her work." Other praise included jury of the Underexposed Film Festival who said "There is something great about seeing a film which celebrates its naive style. I was delighted by some of the treatments that the filmmaker brought to the piece. The smoke was well done for example and I really liked the fact that not everything was just a straight visual representation of what was being said. I also liked the fact that the underwater sequences were graded differently to give those scenes a distinctive look. It also had an excellent use of colour and the vibrant style was good to see. Once Shubhavi hones her craft, she may well produce some very interesting work." Insight Curation Scheme, United Kingdom noted its key influences "I like the animation style very much and the clear and bold shapes in the film (e.g. the green clouds and wind farm), reminding me of Richard Scarry and the original Moomins animated series. It's a warm and witty world to travel through with a strong eco-theme. There are some wonderful creatures here and I love the lo-fi Mighty Booshness of the film's aesthetic and its slow pace." The general consensus praised the film's animated setting, vibrant visuals and pleasant undertones.

The film received numerous international awards and was selected for screening at several international film festivals. It was the only selection from India at many international film festivals including the 51st Chicago International Film Festival – Cine Youth 2015, US and Kratka Forma – The International Festival of Short Films 2015, Serbia. Adventures of Malia was the only film directed by an Under 18-year-old at the Twister Alley Film Festival 2015, US. It received critical acclaim all around the world and was screened in over 48 film festivals in over 18 countries. Adventures of Malia made it into the quarter-finals at the ColorTape International Film Festival 2015, Brisbane, Australia. Adventures of Malia made it into the Top 16 films for the Foreign Film Award at the ColorTape International Film Festival 2015, Brisbane, Australia. It was the only Indian film to be a winner in the Global Independent Film Awards, US in August 2015.

== Awards and nominations ==
Awards and nominations for Adventures of Malia
Year	Association	Country	Award category	Status
2016	Scout Film Festival	United States	Best in Animation	Nominated
2015	Twister Alley International Film Festival	United States	Best Family Short	Nominated
2015	Twister Alley International Film Festival	United States	Best Animated Short	Nominated
2015	Awareness Film Festival	United States	Merit Award of Awareness	Won
2015	ColorTape International Film Festival	Australia	Honorary Mention Award for Best Foreign Film	Won
2015	TOFUZI -7th International Festival of Animation Films	Georgia	Best Children Film	Nominated
2015	International Chinh India Kids Film Festival and Forum	India	Best Kids for Kids	Won
2015	Global Independent Film Awards	United States	Best Environmental Film	Nominated
2015	Global Independent Film Awards	United States	Best Under 18 Filmmaker	Won

== Official selections and screenings ==
Year	Association	Location	Country
2015	Chicago International Film Festival – Cine Youth	Chicago, Illinois	United States
2015	Kratka Forma – The International Festival of Short Films	Gornji Milanovac	Serbia
2015	ENIMATION Little Elephant - International Children and Youth Film Festival	Maribor	Slovenia
2015	Mobographia – Mobile Film Festival	São Paulo	Brazil
2015	Arlington International Film Festival	Cambridge	United States
2015	Global Independent Film Awards	Henderson, Nevada	United States
2015	San Diego International Kids Film Festival	Carlsbad, California	United States
2015	Ithaca Pan Asian American Film Festival	Ithaca, New York	United States
2015	Twister Alley International Film Festival	Oklahoma	United States
2015	Superman Celebration Fan Film Festival	Illinois	United States
2015	Underexposed Film Festival	South Carolina	United States
2015	Red Dirt International Film Festival	Oklahoma	United States
2015	Los Angeles Cine Fest	Los Angeles	United States
2016	Ridgefield Independent Film Festival	Ridgefield, Connecticut	United States
2016	11th REDCAT International Children’s Film Festival	Los Angeles	United States
2017	International Film Festival of Oranjemund	Oranjemund, Karas	Namibia
2016	Ekofilm Festival	Nowogard	Poland
2016	Wiper Film Festival	New York, New York	United States
2016	18th Backup Kurzfilm Festival	Weimar, Thueringen	Germany
2016	Bonita Springs International Film Festival	Bonita Springs, Florida	United States
2015	The Monthly Film Festival	Glasgow	Scotland
2016	Love International Film Festival	Encino, California	United States
2015	Steam House Entertainment Independent Film Awards	Modesto, California	United States
2015	EyeCatcher Film Festival	McAlester, Oklahoma	United States
2015	Salt Flats Film Festival	Bountiful, Utah	United States
2015	Chinh India Kids Film Festival	New Delhi	India
2015	IN.S.A.N.E. International Society Animation Noted Event	Malmö	Sweden
2016	Near Nazareth Festival	Afula	Israel
2015	StarBest Film Festival	Melbourne	Australia
2016	Ozark Shorts	Lamar, Missouri	United States
2015	Visionaria	Sienna	Italy
2015	Festival Angaelica	Pasadena, California	United States
2015	Frame By Sound Festival	Santo Domingo	Dominican Republic
2015	Phoenix Film Festival	Melbourne	Australia
2015	Chiyoko International Children and Youth Film Festival	Zurich	Switzerland
2015	Brighton Youth Film Festival	Brighton	United Kingdom
2015	TOFUZI – 7th International Festival of Animation Films	Batumi	Georgia
2015	AnimaSyros – Videotheque Section	Athens	Greece
2016	Children’s Film Fest Seattle	Seattle	United States
2015	Universal Film Festival	Missouri	United States
2015	School Daze Movie Fest	Oregon	United States
2015	Three Cities International Film and TV Conference	Los Angeles	United States
2015	Columbia Gorge International Film Festival	Los Angeles	United States
2015	Flixx Fest	Los Angeles	United States
2015	Student Art Festival	Goldenrod, Florida	United States
