= Mum (film) =

- Directed by: Akash Mihani
- Written by: Jackie R. Bala
- Produced by: Akash Mihani
- Starring: Gunn Mihani; Inayat Kazi; Nitesh Upadhyay
- Cinematography: Kiren Jadhav
- Edited by: Akash Mihani
- Music by: Bapi-Tutul
- Production company: Sirius Motion Pictures
- Release date: 11 August 2017 (India)
- Running time: 13 minute
- Country: India
- Language: Hindi
- Budget: $22,500

Mum is a 2017 Hindi drama short film directed and produced by Akash Mihani and written by Jackie R. Bala. The film focuses on tackling the worldwide issue of female infanticide and child abandonment. Mum marked the directorial debut of Akash Mihani.

The short film was initially released on 11 August 2017, on the festival circuit and received positive reviews and acclamation around the world. It has bagged more than 27 awards from nearly 70 nominations. Apart from India

, the film was selected for several film festivals in the United States, Georgia, Vietnam, Russia, Belgium, Canada, Switzerland, Spain, China, Ukraine, Sweden, Russia and Kenya, as reported by Firstpost.

== Cast ==
- Gunn Mihani as Mamta
- Inayat Kazi as the Teacher
- Nitesh Upadhyay as Baba (Mamta's Father)

== Plot ==
The story is about Mamta, an 8-year-old school girl, who is struggling with her homework. Mamta garners the attention of her strict teacher as she narrates an unwritten essay on Mother, leaving the teacher speechless. The story is inspired by a real-life incident in Mandsaur district of Madhya Pradesh, where a five-hour-old girl was dumped in a pile of ashes with a 10 kg stone placed on her chest, to ensure she dies of the weight.

== Awards ==
- Best Short Film
  - Calcutta International Cult Films Festival, Kolkata
  - New Delhi Short Film Festival, Delhi
  - Lake View International Film Festival, Punjab
- Best Child Actress
  - LIFFT India Filmotsav, Lonavala
- Best Debut Director
  - Oniros Film Awards, Italy
- Best Director
  - Lake View International Film Festival, Punjab
  - Great Message International Film Festival, Pune
  - Nottingham International Microfilm Festival
- Gold Awards
  - LA Shorts Awards, Los Angeles, US
- Audience Choice Award
  - Free Spirit Film Festival, Himachal Pradesh
- Excellence Award
  - Shaan-E-Awadh International Film Festival, Lucknow
- Silver Award
  - Spotlight Short Film Awards, Atlanta, Georgia
- Honorable Jury Mention Award
  - Mumbai International Short Film Festival, Mumbai
- Best Child Artist
  - Haryana International Film Festival, Hisar
- Best Concept
  - Mumbai Short Film Festival, Mumbai
- Best Asian Short
  - Asia South East Short Film Festival, Ho Chi Minh City, Vietnam
- Best Social Concern Film
  - Global Short Film Awards, Cannes
- Best Young Talent
  - Global Short Film Awards, Cannes
- Women's Voice (B'Oscars)
  - Beeston Film Festival, Beeston, UK
