= Long Island International Film Expo =

Annual Film Festival held on Long Island, New York

The Long Island International Film Expo
- Location: Bellmore, New York, US
- Founded: 1997; 29 years ago
- Founded by: Debra Markowitz
- Festival date: July
- Language: International
- Website: http://www.longislandfilm.com/

The Long Island International Film Expo, founded in 1997 by Nassau County Film Office Director, Debra Markowitz. The festival generally receives between 400 and 450 submissions every year In 2009, 170 films from 23 countries were screened at the festival. Ed Burns, director of films such as The Brothers McMullen and Newlyweds was awarded a Creative Achievement Award during the 2011 festival. The festival hosts several panels on film distribution, screenwriting, and other relevant industry topics.

Past festival attendees include Steve Buscemi, William Baldwin, Edie Falco, Karen Allen and Ralph Macchio.

Notable films that have screened at the festival include The Hotel Manor Inn (1997), Billy's Balloon (1998), Falling Sky (1998), The Hunter's Moon (1999), The Waiting Game (1999), The Pirates of Central Park (2001), L.I.E. (2001), Returning Mickey Stern (2002), Malevolence (2003), Dorian Blues (2004), The Conscientious Objector (2004), The Insurgents (2006), Knocking (2006), The Last Confederate: The Story of Robert Adams (2007), Anytown (2009), Eat Me! (2009), Failing Better Now (2009), As If I Am Not There (2010), Bereavement (2010), Dimensions (2011), Strings (2011), Broadway's Finest (2012), Junction (2012), Theresa Is a Mother (2012), The Human Race (2013), Naked (2013), The Puritans (2013), Bridge and Tunnel (2014), The David Dance (2014), The Historian (2014), Tom in America (2014), Detours (2016), The Hollow (2016), Red (2016), Whoever Was Using This Bed (2016), (Romance) in the Digital Age (2017), The Valley (2017), Two Balloons (2017), Pickings (2018), Abigail (2019), After Class (2019), Bone Cage (2020), Manasanamaha (2020), Tango Shalom (2021) and Scrap (2022).

== 2011 films ==
- Immigrant Son: The Story of John D. Mezzogiorno
- As If I Am Not There
- Jesse
  - Winner: Audience Award
- Defining Beauty: Ms Wheelchair America
- For Belly
- Long Island Uncovered
- Tanzania: A Friendship Journey
  - Winner: Best Documentary
- Composed
- Strings
  - Winner: Best Director, Best Cinematography, Best Supporting Actor, Best Supporting Actress
  - Nominated: Best Feature Film, Best Story
- Fordson: Faith, Fasting, Football
- True to the Heart
  - Winner: Best First Feature, Best Actor, Best Actress
- Quirk of Fate
  - Winner: Best Art Direction
- John Muir: In the New World
- The Test
- Beatboxing - The Fifth Element of Hip Hop
- Romeows (Retired Older Men Eating Out Wednesdays)
- Come Hell or High Water
- King of the Hamptons

== 2020 edition ==
The 2020 edition of the festival, which was originally scheduled to take place from July 10–16, 2020, was postponed to September 30-October 8, 2020 due to the COVID-19 pandemic. The opening and closing nights, along with select screening blocks and the awards ceremony, took place virtually, while some blocks were presented as drive-in screenings at the Samanea New York Market in Uniondale.
