= Paul Warner (director) =

American film director

- Born: United States
- Occupation(s): Film and theatre director

Paul Warner is an American film and theatre director. He is based in New York. He directed Fall Time and In the Name of the Father. In June 2013 he was a resident artist at the Baryshnikov Arts Center. In January 2018 Warner directed the movie musical Kaya: Taste of Paradise.

In January 2018, Warner directed an original movie musical Kaya: Taste of Paradise, starring Okieriete Onaodowan. Warner directed Hamlet/Horatio, starring Andrew Burdette, Themo Melikidze, and Anna Maria Cianciulli. The film premiered in June 2021.

== Filmography ==
- 2021 Hamlet/Horatio - as director
- 2018 Kaya: Taste of Paradise - as director.
- 2013 Women The War Within-director
- 2011 Portraits in Dramatic Time - as co-director
- 2001 Beyond the Pale - as director, writer.
- 1995 Fall Time - as director.
