= List of people from San Diego =

The persons listed here are those with notability who were born, spent a majority of their life, or currently live in San Diego, California.

== A ==
- Faris Abdi, soccer player
- Beth Accomando, film critic, arts reporter, and podcast host
- Ian Adamos, soccer player
- Anderson Lee Aldrich, convicted perpetrator of the 2022 Colorado Springs nightclub shooting
- Eric Allen, professional football player, coach, and analyst
- Jon Allen, voice and film actor (Rick and Morty)
- Kirsten Bloom Allen, ballet dancer and actress
- Greg Allen, professional baseball player
- Marcus Allen, professional player and analyst, college and Pro Football Hall of Famer
- Caroline Amiguet, actress (Angels Fallen, Love All You Have Left)
- Carlos Amezcua, news anchor
- William Anders, astronaut, Apollo 8
- Tom Anderson, founder of social networking site Myspace
- Paul Arriola, soccer player
- Mark Atkinson, film actor and producer (Skin: The Movie, Pulp Friction)
- Margaret Avery, actress, The Color Purple
- Eric Avila, soccer player
- Brian Awadis, YouTuber

== B ==
- Ashli Babbit, January 6 Capitol attacker who was fatally shot by police
- Karl Backus, actor (Thane of East County)
- David Bailey, professional motocross racer
- Dr. Charlotte Johnson Baker, San Diego's first practicing woman physician
- Dr. Fred Baker, physician, founder of the Scripps Institution of Oceanography
- Lester Bangs, music journalist and critic
- Khalif Barnes, professional football player
- Chad Barrett, soccer player
- Arlene Baxter, model and actress
- Billy Beane, general manager of Oakland Athletics, portrayed by Brad Pitt in Moneyball
- Greg Bear, sci-fi novelist; won two Hugo awards; co-founder of San Diego Comic-Con
- Brie Bella, professional wrestler, one-time WWE Divas Champion
- Nikki Bella, professional wrestler, two-time WWE Divas Champion
- Belle Benchley, "The Zoo Lady," President, San Diego Zoo 1927–53, first woman in world to direct major zoo
- Charles Benefiel, outsider artist
- Annette Bening, TV, stage and screen actress, four-time Oscar nominee
- Kurt Benirschke, pathologist and geneticist
- Rolf Benirschke, professional football player
- Lizet Benrey, painter, actress and film director
- Doug Benson, comedian
- Shari Benstock, feminist literary scholar and University of Miami English department chair
- Peter Berkos, Academy Award winner for sound editing
- Wynton Bernard, professional baseball player
- Noah Bernardo, drummer for band P.O.D.
- Rhett Bernstein, soccer player
- Mayim Bialik, TV actress (Blossom, The Big Bang Theory)
- Camren Bicondova, dancer
- Tony Bill, actor, director, and Academy Award-winning producer
- Ryan Binse, film producer and United States Navy veteran
- Stephen Bishop, musician
- Ron Blair, musician, original bassist of band Tom Petty and the Heartbreakers
- Hank Blalock, professional baseball player
- Jolene Blalock, actress (Star Trek: Enterprise)
- Steve Boardman, soccer player
- Kim Bokamper, professional football player
- Ashlee Bond (born 1985), American-Israeli Olympic show jumping rider who competes for Israel
- Bob Boone, professional baseball player
- Josh Borja, soccer player
- Eddie Borysewciz, US Olympic cycling coach, United States Bicycling Hall of Fame
- Sean Bowers, soccer player and coach
- Eileen Bowman, actress (61st Academy Awards)
- Madge Bradley, attorney and judge; first woman appointed to San Diego County bench
- Allison Bradshaw, professional tennis player
- Tim Bradstreet, artist and illustrator
- Debbie Bramwell-Washington, IFBB professional bodybuilder
- Charles Brandes, investment manager, billionaire
- Connor Brandt, soccer player
- Steven Brault, professional baseball player
- Quentin Breese, professional boxer
- Lucille Bremer, actress
- Adam Brody, actor (The O.C.)
- Bill Brown, music composer
- Charles F. Buddy, first bishop of Roman Catholic Diocese of San Diego, University of San Diego founder
- Chase Budinger, professional basketball player
- Jud Buechler, former professional basketball player, NBA coach
- Shai Buium (born 2003), Israeli-American professional ice hockey defenseman in the American Hockey League
- Zeev Buium ( born 2005) , Israeli-American NHL ice hockey defenseman and alternate captain for the Vancouver Canucks
- Victor Buono, actor
- Michael C. Burgess, actor, poet, activist and former editor of The Star-News
- Bob Burnquist, professional skateboarder
- Justin Burquist, filmmaker (Touch)
- Nakia Burrise, actress, best known for portraying the third Yellow Power Ranger, Tanya Sloan
- Eileen Rose Busby, author, antiques expert
- Reggie Bush, professional football player
- Brian Patrick Butler, actor and filmmaker (Friend of the World, Hemet, or the Landlady Don't Drink Tea)
- Chris Byrd, professional boxer, Olympic silver medalist, two-time Heavyweight Champion
- Darryl Byrd, professional football player

== C ==
- Matt Cameron, rock drummer, Pearl Jam, Soundgarden
- Donna Campbell, physician and member of the Texas Senate, born in San Diego in 1954
- Charlie Cannon, singer, theater performer and co-founder of Starlight Opera
- Nick Cannon, actor, rapper, occasional TV host
- Francesca Capaldi, actress (Dog with a Blog)
- Charisma Carpenter, actress
- Kyra Carusa, soccer player who represented the Republic of Ireland women's national team
- Kellye Cash, Miss America, 1987
- Chris Cashman, filmmaker (Thane of East County)
- Billy Casper, golfer, Masters and U.S. Open champion
- John Castellanos, stage, film and television actor, film producer
- Emma Caulfield, actress (Buffy the Vampire Slayer)
- Mark Cerney, founder of Next of Kin Registry (NOKR)
- Billy Lee Chadd, convicted serial killer born in San Diego
- David Chadwick, clinical research pediatrician, author, founder of Chadwick Center for Children and Autism Discovery Institute-San Diego
- Kate Morgan Chadwick, actress, singer
- Raymond Chandler, detective novelist and film noir writer; The Big Sleep, Farewell, My Lovely, The Long Goodbye
- Eric Chavez, professional baseball player
- Jordan Chavez, soccer player
- Steve Cherundolo, soccer player
- Conor Chinn, soccer player
- Bob Clampett, animator (Looney Tunes)
- Judy Clarke, criminal defense attorney
- Jamie Clayton, actress and model
- Eric Close, actor (Without a Trace)
- D. C. Collier, real estate developer, director of the 1915–16 Panama California Exposition
- Aukai Collins, Chechen mujahideen, spent his childhood in Ocean Beach, and part of his early adulthood in City Heights
- Marshall Colt, psychologist and former actor
- Holly Marie Combs, actress Picket Fences, Charmed
- Dennis Conner, America's Cup yachtsman
- Maureen Connolly, professional tennis player, 1953 tennis Grand Slam champion
- Derrike Cope, NASCAR driver
- Salvatore J. Cordileone, Roman Catholic archbishop
- Jorge Cordova, professional football player
- Alana Cordy-Collins, anthropologist
- Carly Craig, actress (Hall Pass, Role Models)
- Dawson Cram, NASCAR driver
- William P. Cronan, naval officer and 19th Naval Governor of Guam
- Robbin Crosby, musician
- Rob Crow, musician
- Cameron Crowe, screenwriter, director, and producer
- Dominick Cruz, mixed martial artist, former UFC bantamweight champion
- Andrew Cunanan, spree killer who murdered Gianni Versace
- Marcos Curiel, musician
- Vinny Curran, actor (Resolution, Everybody Dies by the End)

== D ==
- Austin da Luz, professional soccer player
- John D'Acquisto, professional baseball player
- Adam Daniel, actor (ReelShort series)
- Ted Danson, Emmy Award-winning actor (Cheers, Becker, CSI)
- Mike Davis, professional baseball player
- Terrell Davis, professional football player
- William Heath Davis, early San Diego developer
- Randy Davison, actor (Mank, The United States vs. Billie Holiday)
- Jean Dawson, musician
- Luca de la Torre, professional soccer player
- Liza del Mundo, actress
- Tom DeLonge, singer and musician (Blink-182)
- Warren DeMartini, musician
- Thatcher Demko, goaltender for the Vancouver Canucks
- Doug DeMuro, automotive columnist, reviewer, and author
- Amir Derakh, musician
- Jeff Deverett, film producer (Full Out, The Samuel Project)
- Gail Devers, track and field sprinter, Olympic gold medalist
- Cameron Diaz, actress (My Best Friend's Wedding, Charlie's Angels)
- Frank DiPalermo, actor, playwright, and poet
- John P. Dolan, Catholic bishop
- Veronica Duterte, YouTuber; vlogger
- Patrice Donnelly, athlete and actress
- Johnny Downs, vaudevillian, dancer, actor, TV personality
- Gerry Driscol, yacht racer and businessperson
- Adam Driver, actor
- Ryan Drummond, actor, voice actor, comedian, singer (voice of Sonic the Hedgehog from 1998 to 2004)
- Jared Dudley, professional basketball player
- Momčilo Đujić, WW2 Chetnik guerilla commander
- Robert Duvall, Oscar-winning actor

== E ==
- Jason Earles, actor
- Nathan East, bass player
- Tommy Edman, professional baseball player
- Donnie Edwards, professional football player
- Earl Edwards Jr., professional soccer player
- Lindsay Ellingson, model
- Bob Elliott, professional baseball player
- Boogie Ellis, basketball player
- Joan Embery, animal and environmental advocate
- Roger Guy English, businessman, disc jockey, and Guinness World Record holder
- Iris Engstrand, professor emeritus of history at University of San Diego, author of San Diego: California's Cornerstone
- Hayden Epstein, NFL professional football player
- Scott Erskine, serial killer
- Gary Erwin, TV personality

== F ==
- Daeg Faerch, actor (Halloween, Hancock)
- Mickey Faerch, dancer and actress (Burlesque Hall of Fame, Sincerely Saul)
- Marshall Faulk, professional football player, Hall of Famer
- Raymond E. Feist, author
- Duran Ferree, soccer player
- Amy Finley, cook, author
- John William Finn, Medal of Honor recipient
- Reuben H. Fleet, aviation pioneer, industrialist, Army officer
- Jon Foreman, lead vocalist and guitarist for band Switchfoot
- Tim Foreman, bassist and backing vocalist for band Switchfoot
- Arian Foster, professional football player
- Michael Lewis Foster, filmmaker (Hush, To Fall in Love)
- Julie Foudy, soccer player
- Dan Fouts, professional football player, media analyst, Hall of Famer
- Frankie J, singer
- Sidney Franklin, actor and tap dancer (Watch Over Me, Excision)
- Ace Frehley, lead guitarist for band Kiss
- Steve Froehlich, film and theater actor
- Mike Fuentes, musician, drummer for band Pierce the Veil
- Vic Fuentes, musician, vocalist and rhythm guitarist for band Pierce the Veil

== G ==
- Mo Gaffney, actress
- Lukas Gage, actor (The White Lotus)
- Diamanda Galás, composer, vocalist, and keyboard artist
- Beth Gallagher, actress (To Fall in Love)
- Ray Gallardo, film director and cinematographer (At the Frontera)
- Greg Garcia, professional baseball player
- Adrian Garcia Marquez, sports announcer
- Maruta Gardner, educator, community activist
- Major Garrett, reporter
- Steve Garvey, professional baseball player, businessman
- Audrey Geisel, philanthropist
- Francis Gercke, actor and artistic director
- Jeff Gianola, television news anchor
- Brian Giles, professional baseball player
- Marcus Giles, professional baseball player
- Jared S. Gilmore, child actor
- Francoise Gilot, painter, author
- Broc Glover, motocross national champion
- La'Roi Glover, professional football player
- Mark Goffeney, guitarist born without arms, disability advocate
- Susan Golding, businesswoman, politician
- Stephen Gonsalves, professional baseball player
- Adrián González, professional baseball player
- Sandra Good, former Manson Family member
- Andrew Good, professional baseball player
- Tony Gorodeckas, actor and real estate agent
- Edgar Gott, aviation industry executive
- Mark Grace, professional baseball player
- Robert Klark Graham, businessman and eugenicist
- Cecil H. Green, geophysicist, philanthropist
- Harold Greene, television journalist
- Robbie Grossman, professional baseball player
- Alejandro Guido, professional soccer player
- Manuel Gutierrez (aka Manny MUA), YouTuber
- Tony Gwynn, professional baseball player and coach, Hall of Famer, won 8 batting titles
- Tony Gwynn Jr., professional baseball player, son of Tony Gwynn

== H ==
- Leon Hall, professional football player
- Cole Hamels, professional baseball player
- Rosie Hamlin, singer
- Jonathan Hammond, film director and screenwriter (Fireflies in the Dusk, We All Die Alone)
- Jaylen Hands, professional basketball player
- Aaron Harang, professional baseball player, attended San Diego State
- Mike Harkey, Major League Baseball pitcher and coach
- Margo Harshman, actress (Sorority Row)
- Charles Mallory Hatfield, rainmaker
- Riley Hawk, professional skateboarder, son of Tony Hawk
- Tony Hawk, professional skateboarder
- Le Ly Hayslip, memoirist and humanitarian
- Roger Hedgecock, mayor and radio personality
- Chris Hegardt, soccer player
- David Hensley, MLB infielder
- Faithe Herman, actress (This Is Us, Shazam!)
- Mirelle Hernández, make-up artist (Fear the Walking Dead)
- Arthur Hobbs, professional football player
- James Holmes, convicted gunman of the 2012 Aurora, Colorado shooting
- Dennis Hopper, actor and director (Easy Rider, Speed)
- Mark Hoppus, singer and musician (Blink-182)
- Alonzo Horton, early San Diego developer, created "New Town San Diego", later Downtown
- Benjamin Howard, filmmaker (Riley)
- James Oliver Huberty, perpetrator of San Ysidro McDonald's Massacre
- Kimberly Hunt, news anchor
- Joe Hutshing, Oscar-winning film editor

== I ==
- Gabriel Iglesias, stand-up comedian
- Christofer Drew Ingle, musician
- Doug Ingle, founder of band Iron Butterfly, primary creator of In-A-Gadda-Da-Vida, first platinum record
- Darrell Issa, U.S. representative

== J ==
- JabbaWockeeZ, dance crew
- Jacob Jackson, soccer player
- Jordan Jacobo, actor and screenwriter
- Sara Jacobs, U.S. representative
- Father Luís Jayme, California's first Christian martyr
- Jayo Felony, rapper
- Jazzmun, actress and activist
- Tony Jefferson, professional football player
- Kris Jenner, television personality
- Johnny Jeter, professional wrestler
- Deron Johnson, professional baseball player
- Jimmie Johnson, NASCAR driver, seven-time champion
- Adam Jones, professional baseball player
- Dhani Jones, professional football player
- Jacque Jones, professional baseball player
- Ron Christopher Jones, actor and production manager
- Lonnie Jordan, musician, War
- Ian Joy, professional soccer player, sports broadcaster
- David Justice, professional baseball player

== K ==
- Lori Kay, artist
- Kendrick Bangs Kellogg, architect
- Tom Kelly, “Shotgun” Tom Kelly, radio and television personality
- Kerri Kendall, model
- Jewel Kilcher, Grammy-nominated singer
- Tawny Kitaen, model and actress
- Laurence Monroe Klauber, herpetologist
- Charles Klusmann, escaped from Vietnamese POW camp 1964
- Ken Kocher, professional football player
- Raph Koster, author and game designer
- Joel Kramer, NBA and Israeli Basketball Premier League 'basketball player
- Lynn Kramer, skateboarder
- Joan Kroc, philanthropist
- Ray Kroc, founder of the McDonald's corporation, owned San Diego Padres
- Cy Kuckenbaker, filmmaker
- Alice K. Kurashige, first Japanese-American woman to be commissioned in US Marine Corps

== L ==
- Aimee La Joie, actress (Freedom, Wisconsin, Hemet, or the Landlady Don't Drink Tea)
- Frankie Laine, singer and actor
- Adam Lambert, singer, runner-up on American Idol
- Tim Lambesis, vocalist for band As I Lay Dying
- Fabio Lanzoni, model
- Joe Lara, actor
- Bob Larsen, track and field coach, Olympic coach
- Don Larsen, professional baseball player, pitched perfect game in 1956 World Series
- Bucky Lasek, professional skateboarder
- Tammy Lauren, actress
- Robbie Lawler, mixed martial artist
- lê thi diem thúy, novelist and performance artist, The Gangster We Are All Looking For (2004)
- Brad Leaf, American-Israeli basketball player
- Bessie Learn, silent film actress
- Bobby Lee, MadTV actor and comedian
- Karenssa LeGear, actress (Carving a Life)
- David Leisure, "Joe Isuzu," character actor and comedian (Empty Nest)
- Brynton Lemar (born 1995), American-born Jamaican basketball player for Hapoel Jerusalem of the Israeli Basketball Premier League
- Jeanne Lenhart, senior Olympian, senior pageant winner, performing arts teacher
- Joe Leonard, automobile and motorcycle racing champion
- William S. Lerach, securities class action attorney, investor advocate
- Cliff Levingston, professional basketball player
- Sarah Levy (born 1995), Olympic bronze medalist, rugby union and rugby sevens player
- Cassidy Lichtman, professional volleyball player
- Lil Rob, Chicano rapper
- Art Linkletter, television personality
- Cleavon Little, actor (Blazing Saddles)
- Gene Littler, professional golfer, World Golf Hall of Famer
- Harold Lloyd, silent film actor
- John Logan, screenwriter
- Konstantin Lokhanov (born 1998), junior world champion and Olympic saber fencer living in San Diego
- Mario López, actor and television personality (Saved by the Bell, Extra!)
- Greg Louganis, Olympic gold-medalist diver
- Moses A. Luce, lawyer

== M ==
- John Macaulay, professional NFL football player
- Rob Machado, professional surfer
- Doug Manchester, real estate developer, owner of The San Diego Union-Tribune
- Barbara Mandrell, country music singer and musician
- Gloria Marks, All-American Girls Professional Baseball League player
- Tate Martell, college football player, Netflix Original QB1: Beyond the Lights
- Ross Martin, actor (The Wild Wild West)
- Clay Marzo, professional surfer
- James Maslow, actor, singer from boy band Big Time Rush
- Victor Mature, actor (Kiss of Death)
- Maria Goeppert Mayer, scientist, worked at Los Alamos; Nobel Prize in physics, 1963
- Patrick Mayuyu, actor and choreographer (We All Die Alone)
- Mercedes McCambridge, Oscar-winning actress, star of radio, TV, stage and screen
- Merrick McCartha, television and film actor (All American, Failure!)
- Dave McCary, comedian and director
- Bill McColl, professional NFL football player and surgeon
- William C. McCool, astronaut
- Kyle McDonald, singer and musician
- Tug McGraw, professional MLB baseball player, father of country singer Tim McGraw
- Danica McKellar, author and actress (The Wonder Years)
- Don McManus, actor
- Naomi McPherson, guitarist of Muna
- Michael Medved, radio host, political commentator, film critic
- Dan Melville, NFL football player
- Bob Mendoza, professional baseball player and coach, San Diego Hall of Champions inductee
- Cordelia Mendoza, antiques expert, businesswoman, author
- Maddie Mercado, soccer player
- Shep Meyers, musician
- Phil Mickelson, professional golfer, Masters and British Open champion
- David Miller, operatic singer
- Martin Milner, actor (Adam-12)
- Lani Minella, voice actress
- El Hijo de Rey Misterio, professional wrestler
- Brian Stokes Mitchell, film and Broadway actor and vocalist, Tony Award winner
- Kevin Mitchell, professional MLB baseball player
- Silas Weir Mitchell, actor
- Ron Mix, "the intellectual assassin," professional AFL and NFL football player, Hall of Famer
- Isaiah Mobley (born 1999), basketball player for Hapoel Jerusalem of the Israeli Basketball Premier League and the EuroCup.
- Matthew Modine, actor (Full Metal Jacket, The Dark Knight Rises)
- John J. Montgomery, pioneer aviator
- Adam Montoya, YouTube personality, gamer
- Kyle Mooney, Saturday Night Live cast member, 2013–2022
- Archie Moore, professional boxer
- Trevi Moran, singer, YouTuber
- Alex Morgan, professional soccer player, US Women's National Team
- Tawny Moyer, actress (Halloween II)
- Jason Mraz, Grammy-winning singer
- Thom Michael Mulligan, actor and playwright
- Joe Musgrove, professional baseball player
- Chad Muska, professional skateboarder
- Dominik Mysterio, professional wrestler, son of Rey Mysterio
- Rey Mysterio, professional wrestler, WWE Hall of Famer

== N ==
- Kathy Najimy, actress (Sister Act, Hocus Pocus)
- Brandon Nakashima, tennis player
- Gregory Nava, Oscar-nominated film director and screenwriter
- Stephen Neal, professional football player
- Andrew Newmark, activist, musician
- Walter R. Nickel, M.D., dermatologist and dermatopathologist
- Lou Niles, radio host of 91X and executive director of Oceanside International Film Festival
- Kent Ninomiya, journalist
- Craig Noel, theatre producer
- Matt Nokes, professional baseball player
- Suzana Norberg, actress (Danger Girl, Libertyville)
- Fred E. Norris Jr., architect

== O ==
- Ellen Ochoa, NASA astronaut
- Raymond Ochoa, actor
- Ryan Ochoa, actor (iCarly, The Samuel Project)
- Ronan O'Gara, Irish rugby union player (Ireland's second most-capped player and highest ever points scorer) and current coach
- Chris Olave, football player
- Tony Olmos, filmmaker (Continuance, Hemet, or the Landlady Don't Drink Tea)
- Heather O'Rourke, actress (Poltergeist)
- John Ottman, soundtrack composer
- Alexandrea Owens-Sarno, actress

== P ==
- Patti Page, legendary country and pop singer, film actress; real name Clara Ann Fowler
- Carson Palmer, professional football player, Heisman Trophy winner
- Chuck Palumbo, professional wrestler
- Jennifer Paredes, actress (South of 8)
- Adam Pearce, professional wrestler
- Stephen Pearcy, musician
- Carlton Pearson, televangelist
- Justin Pearson, musician
- Everett Peck, cartoonist, illustrator, animator and creator of Duckman and Squirrel Boy
- Gregory Peck, Oscar-winning actor
- Clarence M. Pendleton Jr., chairman of United States Commission on Civil Rights 1981–88
- Luke Pensabene, actor, film producer, U.S. Marine Corps veteran (South of 8, Hacksaw, The Phantom Hour)
- Bob Penuelas, cartoonist
- Scott Perry, U.S. representative for Pennsylvania
- Scott Peters, U.S. representative and former San Diego City Councillor and San Diego Port Commissioner
- Scott Peterson, convicted murderer
- Craig Peyer, convicted murderer
- Dat Phan, comedian
- Regis Philbin, television personality
- Steve Poltz, singer-songwriter and guitarist
- Larry Poole, actor and film producer (A Rodeo Film, The Final Wish)
- Zach Porter, singer of Allstar Weekend
- Norman Powell, professional basketball player
- Conrad Prebys, philanthropist
- Jaime Preciado, bass player and vocalist for band Pierce the Veil
- Jenna Presley, actress
- Ben Press, tennis professional and coach
- Barry Pressing, contemporary artist and sculptor
- Gary Puckett, musician and singer
- Sarah Purcell, television personality
- Geoffrey Pyatt, diplomat

== Q ==
- Aodhan Quinn, soccer player

== R ==
- Sara Ramirez, Tony-winning actress and singer (And Just Like That)
- Emily Ratajkowski, actress and model (Gone Girl)
- Scott Raynor, musician
- Tommy Redding, professional soccer player
- Autumn Reeser, actress
- Steve Reeves, actor, bodybuilder, author
- John Reis, musician, swami
- Richard Requa, architect
- Roger Revelle, oceanographer, founder of UCSD
- Neil Raymond Ricco, poet
- Denise Richards, actress (Starship Troopers, Wild Things)
- Sally Ride, astronaut
- Thomas Ridgway, U.S. Army officer and father of General Matthew Ridgway
- Johnny Ritchey, professional baseball player
- Dave Roberts, professional baseball player and manager
- Cliff Robertson, Oscar-winning actor
- Alfred D. Robinson and Marion James Robinson, builders of Rosecroft
- Arnie Robinson, Olympic long jump gold medalist
- Mitt Romney, politician
- Tony Romo, professional football player
- Louis Rose, developer
- Seraphim Rose, hieromonk
- Marion Ross, actress, Happy Days
- Neil Ross, voice actor
- Kerry Rossall, actor and stuntman (Apocalypse Now, Justified)
- Patrick Rowe, professional football player
- Pete Rozelle, famed publicist, NFL commissioner
- Ilan Rubin, musician
- Sam Rubin, entertainment reporter
- Shay Rudolph, actress, social media influencer
- FaZe Rug, YouTube personality, co-owner of FaZe Clan
- Chad Ruhwedel, professional ice hockey player
- RuPaul, performer, television personality
- Betsy Russell, actress, Saw
- Jason Russell, film director

== S ==
- Mike Saipe (born 1973) , Major League Baseball pitcher.
- Rashaan Salaam, professional football player, Heisman Trophy winner
- Jonas Salk, physician, developed polio vaccine; founder, Salk Institute; Presidential medal of freedom (1977)
- Daniel Samohin (born 1998), Israeli Olympic figure skater
- Jessica Sanchez, American Idol contestant
- Shauna Sand, Playboy model, "Playmate of the Month" for May 1996
- Sonny Sandoval, musician
- Xander Schauffele, professional golfer
- David Schipper, professional soccer player
- Wally Schlotter, chairman of the San Diego Film Commission 1978–96
- Casey Schmitt (born 1999), infielder for the San Francisco Giants
- Rose Schneider (1895–1976) American painter
- Cathy Scott, journalist and true-crime author
- Devin Scott, filmmaker (The $5 Movie, Libertyville)
- J. Michael Scott, scientist, environmentalist and author
- Junior Seau, professional football player, Hall of Famer
- Kate Sessions, horticulturalist, "the mother of Balboa Park"
- Dr. Seuss, Pulitzer-prize winning children's author; real name Theodor Geisel
- Stephanie Seymour, model
- Norm Sherry (1931–2021), catcher, manager, and coach in Major League Baseball
- Al Silvera (1935–2002), major league baseball player
- Kerry Simmonds, rower, Olympic gold medalist
- Gina Simmons Schneider, author, therapist, writer
- Mary Sinclair, actress
- Andy Skib, musician
- Alexandra Slade, actress (Friend of the World, We All Die Alone)
- Mitchy Slick, musician
- Alex Smith, professional football player
- Marty Smith, motocross national champion
- Carly Smithson, singer
- Chris Soriano, filmmaker and actor (Almighty Zeus, The Wedding Hustler)
- Sebastian Soto, professional soccer player
- Suzy Spafford, artist
- Brenda Spencer, convicted murderer
- John D. Spreckels, businessman and industrialist
- Michael Stamm, Olympic swimmer, national champion
- Scott Stantis, editorial cartoonist
- Amun Starr, musician and humanitarian
- Anne State, television news anchor
- Harry L. Steele, US Army major general
- Riley Steele, pornographic actress
- Jeremy Stenberg, professional motocross rider
- Payson R. Stevens, science communicator, artist, environmentalist
- Kenny Stills, professional football player
- J. J. Stokes, professional football player
- Milburn Stone, actor (Gunsmoke)
- Rob Stone, rapper
- Melvin Storer, shipfitter, U.S. Navy diver and Attack on Pearl Harbor survivor
- Stephen Strasburg, professional baseball player, 2019 World Series MVP
- Frederick S. Strong, US Army major general
- Garrett Stubbs (born 1993), Major League Baseball catcher
- Frederick W. Sturckow, astronaut
- Savannah Sturges, top 10 finalist on MasterChef Season 4
- Karen Hantze Susman, tennis player
- Zachary Svajda, tennis player
- Leslie Sykes, television news anchor
- Leo Szilard, physicist, fellow of Salk Institute for Biological Studies, died in San Diego

== T ==
- Dalani Tanahy, artist specializing in the Hawaiian art of creating kapa
- Roberto Tapia, musician
- Lauren Taylor, actress and singer (Best Friends Whenever)
- Shannon Taylor, film producer, musician and actress (The Flourish, We All Die Alone)
- Brian Teacher (born 1954), tennis player, Australian Open singles champion, ranked #7 in the world in singles.
- Jonathan Temple (1796–1866), landowner, rancher and politician
- Jamie Thomas, professional skateboarder
- Pete Thomas, football player
- Soren Thompson (born 1981), Olympic and world champion épée fencer
- Susanna Thompson (born 1958), actress
- Katherine Tingley, creator of Theosophical Society compound at Lomaland
- Robert Titzer, writer known for Your Baby Can Read! infant learning book
- Levine Toilolo, professional football player
- Ted Tollner, professional football coach
- Jerry Trainor, actor (Drake & Josh)
- Alan Trammell, professional baseball player and manager
- Kelly Marie Tran, actress (Star Wars: The Last Jedi, Raya and the Last Dragon)
- Marty Tripes, winner of first Super Bowl of motocross
- Ian Tripp, filmmaker and actor (Everybody Dies by the End, Sincerely Saul)
- Elise Trouw, singer-songwriter, multi-instrumentalist, and record producer
- Bitsie Tulloch, actress
- Twisted Insane, real name Michael Johnson, rapper
- Jeremy Tyler, professional basketball player
- Roqy Tyraid, rapper and activist

== U ==
- Harold Urey, physical chemist and UCSD professor
- Edred Utomi, stage actor and singer (Hamilton)

== V ==
- Usha Vance, second lady of the United States
- W.S. Van Dyke, film director
- Tiffany van Soest, kickboxer
- Tommy Vardell, professional football player
- Juan Vargas, U.S. representative and former California state senator, state assembyman, and San Diego City Councillor
- Eddie Vedder, singer in rock band Pearl Jam
- Juli Veee, soccer player
- Craig Venter, biologist, entrepreneur
- Victor Villaseñor, author
- Erik von Detten, actor (Toy Story, The Princess Diaries)

== W ==
- Tom Waits, singer-songwriter, composer and actor
- William Wall, filmmaker (Daisy Belle)
- Bill Walton, professional basketball player and media analyst, Hall of Famer
- Luke Walton, professional basketball player and coach
- Fred Ward, actor (Tremors)
- Kelly Ward, actor
- Danny Way, professional skateboarder
- Hubert Webb, murder suspect
- Harry M. Wegeforth, physician, founder of the San Diego Zoo
- Whitney Wegman-Wood, actress and screenwriter (The Last Butterflies)
- Scott Weiland, lead singer of Stone Temple Pilots
- Kimberly Weinberger, actress (Hemet, or the Landlady Don't Drink Tea)
- Raquel Welch, Golden Globe Award-winning actress (Right to Die)
- Tahnee Welch, model and actress
- David Wells, professional baseball player
- Julie White, Tony Award-winning actress
- Shaun White, professional skateboarder and snowboarder, Olympic gold medalist
- Cole Whitt, NASCAR driver
- Larry Wilcox, actor
- Kendra Wilkinson, model and television personality
- Carol Williams, concert organist, composer
- Damien Williams, professional football player
- Michelle Williams, Oscar-nominated actress (Brokeback Mountain, The Fabelmans)
- Mikey Williams, basketball player
- Nathan Williams, musician
- Ricky Williams, professional football player, Heisman Trophy winner
- Ted Williams, professional baseball player, Hall of Famer, won 7 batting titles
- Trevor Williams, professional baseball player
- Ann Wilson, musician
- Jim Wilson, professional baseball pitcher and general manager
- Pete Wilson, mayor of San Diego, governor of California and U.S. senator
- Scott Wilson, professional bodybuilder
- Kellen Winslow, professional football player, Hall of Famer
- Kellen Winslow II, professional football player and convicted rapist
- Jeff Withey (born 1990), professional basketball player
- Cassidy Wolf, Miss Teen USA
- Sara Wolfkind, actress (Grimcutty, Love All You Have Left)
- James Wong, television writer and producer, film director
- Christine Wormuth, 25th United States Secretary of the Army
- Harold Bell Wright, author, Shepherd of the Hills (1941)
- Mickey Wright, LPGA golfer, World Golf Hall of Famer
- Robin Wright, Golden Globe Award-winning actress
- Marvell Wynne II, professional soccer player

== Y ==
- Nick Young, actor (Friend of the World)
- Chris Devlin-Young, paralympian alpine skiing

== Z ==
- Frank Zappa, musician
- Joanna Zeiger (born 1970), Olympic and world champion triathlete, and author
- Valerie Ziegenfuss, professional tennis player
- Sal Zizzo, professional soccer player
- Joel Zumaya, professional baseball player
