= Carla Nell =

American actress and director

- Years active: 2004–present
- Known for: InnerMission Productions
- Notable work: We All Die Alone

Carla Nell is an American actress, theatre director, producer, and artistic director based in San Diego, California. She co-founded the San Diego theatre company InnerMission Productions, directing productions of The Taming of the Shrew, Seven Spots on the Sun, Melancholy Play, and appearing in the film We All Die Alone.

== Career ==
=== Theatre ===
Nell was cast as Helen in a 2008 OnStage Playhouse production of Neil LaBute's Fat Pig. She co-founded InnerMission Productions with Kym Pappas which began producing theatre in San Diego in the 2000s.

Nell directed InnerMission's 2011 production of Adam Bock's Swimming in the Shallows. In 2013, Nell and Pappas co-directed The Coffee Shop Chronicles at New Play Cafe, with Nell also appearing in the production. She directed Big Kitchen: A Counter-Culture Musical for the 2015 San Diego International Fringe Festival.

Nell starred in InnerMission's 2017 production of Johnna Adams' two-character play Gidion's Knot.

=== Directing ===
In 2016, Nell directed William Shakespeare's The Taming of the Shrew, swapping genders for some male roles and setting the story in the 1960s. After the production, Nell described that earlier productions of the playwright's work had influenced her approach.

Later in 2016, Nell directed Martin Zimmerman's Seven Spots on the Sun. She later directed InnerMission's 2018 production of Sarah Ruhl's Melancholy Play. In 2024, she directed BRAT, a Bocón Arts production that toured multiple venues in San Diego County.

=== Advocacy and storytelling ===
While studying theatre at San Diego State University, she became involved in a staged production of Eve Ensler's The Vagina Monologues after seeing a lack of leading roles for female students. In 2015, Nell volunteered for the Lilly Awards and InnerMission launched its first full theatrical season.

Nell's interest in gender allowed her to come up with a 2016 interpretation of The Taming of the Shrew after she and Pappas established a reputation for feminist-oriented theatre. In 2019, she participated in a So Say We All VAMP event, presenting a story about wanting a child and the inability to do so.

=== Film ===
Nell appeared as Patsy in Jonathan Hammond's 2021 dark comedy short film We All Die Alone, which she also served as executive producer.

== Filmography ==
Year	Title	Role	Notes
2004	Trial by Fire: SDSU Design: The Making of a Theatre Professional/Performance Jury	Herself	
2018	Isabel	Sybil	Short film, also producer
2021	We All Die Alone	Patsy	Also executive producer
2023	The Buck Stop		Directed by Jordan Jacobo

== Stage credits ==
Acting roles
Year	Title	Role	Location	Notes
2008	Fat Pig	Helen	OnStage Playhouse, Chula Vista, California	
2013	Terminator 4	Tammy	Big Kitchen Cafe, San Diego, California	by Jonathan Hammond, Coffee Shop Chronicles, co-directed with Kym Pappas
2014	Longview, TX	Blanche Duvet	Ocean Beach Playhouse, Ocean Beach, San Diego	
2017	Gidion's Knot	Heather Clark	Diversionary Theater, University Heights, San Diego	

InnerMission Productions
Year	Title	Director	Sound designer	Location	Notes
	The Vagina Monologues	Yes	No	San Diego State University	Director
2006	All in the Timing	Co-director	No	New World Stage, San Diego, California	Co-directed with Claudio Raygoza
2006	Dancing at Lughnasa	Yes	No	OnStage Playhouse, Chula Vista, California	Director
2007	How I Learned to Drive	—N/a	—N/a	OnStage Playhouse, Chula Vista, California	
2008	The Vagina Monologues	—N/a	—N/a	OnStage Playhouse, Chula Vista, California	
2013	Lock and Key	Yes	No	Big Kitchen Cafe, San Diego, California	Coffee Shop Chronicles, co-directed with Kym Pappas
2013	Who-Ha	Yes	No	Big Kitchen Cafe, San Diego, California	Coffee Shop Chronicles, co-directed with Kym Pappas
2013	Booth Watching	Yes	No	Big Kitchen Cafe, San Diego, California	Coffee Shop Chronicles, co-directed with Kym Pappas
2013	Witch Cafe	Yes	No	Big Kitchen Cafe, San Diego, California	Coffee Shop Chronicles, co-directed with Kym Pappas
2013	Message Send Failure	Yes	No	Big Kitchen Cafe, San Diego, California	Coffee Shop Chronicles, co-directed with Kym Pappas
2013	Between Heaven and Hell	Yes	No	Big Kitchen Cafe, San Diego, California	Coffee Shop Chronicles, co-directed with Kym Pappas
2015	Precious Little	Yes	No	Diversionary Theater, University Heights, San Diego	Director, by Madeleine George
2015	Big Kitchen: A Counter Culture Musical	Yes	No	Spreckels Theatre, San Diego, California	Director
2016	Seven Spots on the Sun	Yes	No	Diversionary Theater, University Heights, San Diego	Director, featuring Jennifer Paredes
2016	Seminar	No	Yes	Diversionary Theater, University Heights, San Diego	Sound designer
2016	The Taming of the Shrew	Yes	No	Diversionary Theater, University Heights, San Diego	Director
2017	Ordinary Days	—N/a	—N/a	Diversionary Theater, University Heights, San Diego	
2018	Melancholy Play	Yes	Yes	Diversionary Theater, University Heights, San Diego	Director and sound designer
2024	Tiny Beautiful Things	No	Yes	Scripps Ranch Theatre, Alliant International University	Sound designer
2024	BRAT	Yes	—N/a	Light Box Theater, Liberty Station, San Diego	Director, featuring Samantha Ginn and Patrick Mayuyu

== Accolades ==
Festival	Year	Award	Title	Result	Ref.
Reeling: The Chicago LGBTQ+ International Film Festival	2022	Best Narrative Short – Audience Choice Award	We All Die Alone	Won	
Burbank International Film Festival	2022	Best LGBTQ Short Film	We All Die Alone	Won	
Downtown Los Angeles Film Festival	2022	Best Ensemble Cast	We All Die Alone	Won	
Oceanside International Film Festival	2022	Best Supporting Actress	We All Die Alone	Nominated	
