= Hannah Logan =

American actress and playwright

- Occupations: Actress; playwright; theatre director; producer
- Years active: 2008–present
- Awards: Craig Noel Award for Outstanding Lead Performance in a Play

Hannah Logan is an American actress, playwright, theatre director and producer who won a Craig Noel Award for Outstanding Lead Performance in a Play for her performance in Ion Theatre Company's 2014 production of Tracy Letts' Bug. Her playwriting includes Trailerville, which was produced in Los Angeles.

== Career ==
Logan studied musical theatre and directing at the Boston Conservatory. After working in Los Angeles, she moved to San Diego, where she became active as an actress, playwright and director. She wrote Trailerville, a play that was produced in Los Angeles in 2008 about the residents of a trailer park in the American South.

=== Acting ===
In 2014, Logan played Agnes White opposite Steve Froehlich in Ion Theatre Company's production of Tracy Letts' Bug. That year, she won a Craig Noel Award for Outstanding Lead Performance in a Play for Bug and received a nomination for Outstanding Featured Performance in a Play for The Clean House. Logan later appeared in San Diego productions including The Moors and What Happens Next.

=== Directing and producing ===
Logan directed OnStage Playhouse's 2020 production of Bekah Brunstetter's Going to a Place Where You Already Are. In March 2020, she helped organize Theatre Is the Cure, an virtual theatre project that connected playwrights, directors and actors remotely during the COVID-19 pandemic. Logan is also involved in the Playwrights Project, a nonprofit that establishes theatre programs for participants who come from a variety of backgrounds.

== Stage credits ==
Year	Production	Role or contribution	Theatre or company	Location	Ref.
2008	Trailerville	Ruthie Macaloon	From the Ground Up Theatre Company / Moving Arts Theater	Los Angeles, California	Also playwright
2008	Trailerville	—N/a	Kraine Theater	New York City, New York	Playwright
2013	Accomplice: San Diego	Actor	La Jolla Playhouse	San Diego, California	
2013	Blackout at Battery Cliff	Actor	Scripps Ranch Theatre, Out on a Limb	San Diego, California	
2013	Mermaids	Actor	Scripps Ranch Theatre, Out on a Limb	San Diego, California	
2013	Works: In Progress	Actor	San Diego International Fringe Festival	San Diego, California	Also writer
2014	Bug	Agnes White	Ion Theatre Company	San Diego, California	
2014	Hommage à Fromage	—N/a	Love Creek Productions	New York City, New York	Playwright
2014	The Clean House	Virginia	New Village Arts	Carlsbad, California	
2014	All Circuits Are Busy	—N/a	Ion Theatre Company	San Diego, California	Playwright; staged reading
2017	Accomplice	Actor	Scripps Ranch Theatre	San Diego, California	
2017	The Moors	Actor	Diversionary Theatre	San Diego, California	
2018	What Happens Next	Actor	La Jolla Playhouse	La Jolla, California	
2018	Melancholy Play	Tilly	InnerMission Productions, Black Box at Diversionary Theatre	San Diego, California	
2019	Sweat	Actor	San Diego Repertory Theatre	San Diego, California	
2019	Stain	—N/a	Scripps Ranch Theatre, Out on a Limb	San Diego, California	Director
2020	Going to a Place Where You Already Are	—N/a	OnStage Playhouse	Chula Vista, California	Director
