= Alexandra Slade =

American actress

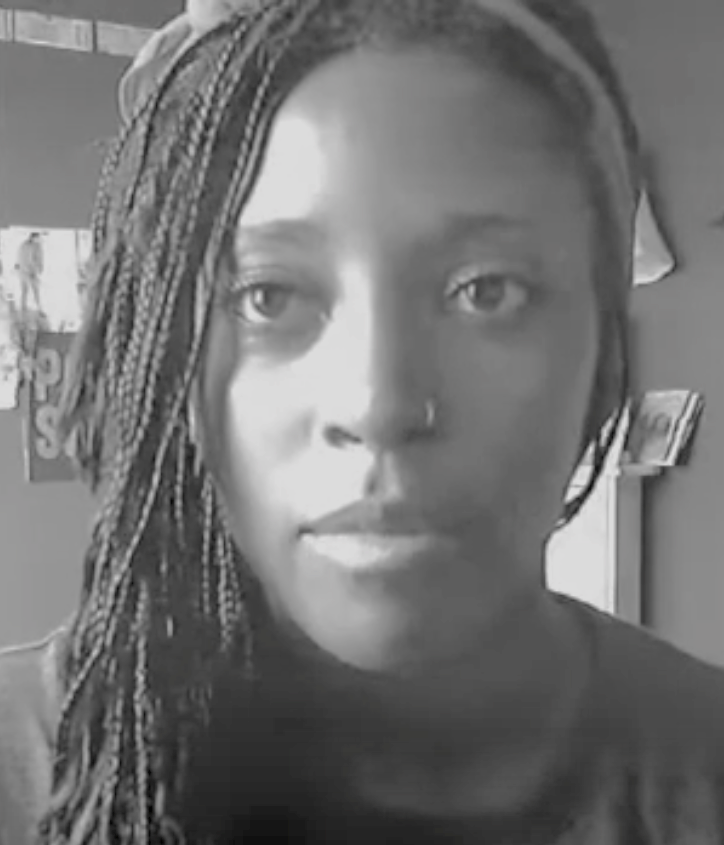
- Slade in 2012
- Education: Monte Vista High School; Grossmont College; American Musical and Dramatic Academy
- Occupation: Actress
- Years active: 2014–present
- Known for: Friend of the World; We All Die Alone
- Notable credits: Good People; The Legend of Georgia McBride; Portrayal of Ruby Bridges in The Ruby in Us
- Height: 5 ft 4 in (163 cm)
- Father: Rolland Slade

Alexandra Slade is an American actress who appeared in the films Friend of the World (2020), We All Die Alone (2021) and Cygnet Theatre's production of The Legend of Georgia McBride (2017). She portrayed a young Ruby Bridges in Old Globe Theatre's The Ruby in Us (2019) and was nominated for a Craig Noel Award for Outstanding Featured Performance in a Musical, Female by the San Diego Theatre Critics Circle for her portrayal of Ado Annie Carnes in Oklahoma! (2016) at New Village Arts Theatre.

== Career ==
Slade was cast as the leading role of Diane in Friend of the World by Brian Patrick Butler in 2017 and the film was distributed by Troma Entertainment in 2022. Her performance, alongside co-star Nick Young, has received praise from several film critics. Daniel M. Kimmel described her character as introspective and intersectional. That same year she was cast as Kate in Good People at Scripps Ranch Theatre and Jo in The Legend of Georgia McBride at Cygnet Theatre.

In 2019, Slade portrayed a young Ruby Bridges in The Ruby in Us, a production at the Old Globe Theatre. She was later cast as part of an ensemble in We All Die Alone by Jonathan Hammond.

== Filmography ==
Year	Title	Role
2015	Luminous Flux	Dr. Samantha Edwards
2016	5150	Unknown
2020	Friend of the World	Diane
2021	We All Die Alone	Evangelique

== Stage credits ==
Year	Title	Role	Location	Ref.
	Thoroughly Modern Millie	Millie		
	Much Ado About Nothing	Beatrice		
2012	Once on This Island	—N/a	San Diego Performing Arts Center, San Diego, California	
2013	Rent	—N/a		
2013	Hairspray	Little Inez	Welk Resort Theatre, Escondido, California	
2014	Chicago	Mona	Coronado Playhouse, Coronado, California	
2014	The Jungle Book	Assistant Choreographer	The Theatre Arts School of San Diego, San Diego, California	
2014	Bare	Kyra / Assistant Choreographer	Diversionary Theatre, San Diego, California	
2014	Naughty or Nice	—N/a	Tenth Avenue Arts Center, San Diego, California	
2015	Plays by Young Writers	Danielle Jones	Old Globe Theatre, San Diego, California	
2015	San Diego, I Love You 3.0	Joanne	La Jolla Playhouse, La Jolla, California	
2015	Wrenegades: An Ecological Adventure	Cactus Wren	La Jolla Playhouse, La Jolla, California	
2015	Spring Awakening	Anna	The Barn Stage Company, Temecula, California	
2016	Ragtime	Pas de Deux, Ensemble	San Diego Musical Theatre, San Diego, California	
2016	Oklahoma!	Ado Annie Carnes	New Village Arts Theatre, Carlsbad, California	
2017	Good People	Kate Dillon	Scripps Ranch Theatre, San Diego, California	
2017	The Legend of Georgia McBride	Jo	Cygnet Theatre, San Diego, California	
2017	Cinderella Eats Rice and Beans: A Salsa Fairy Tale	—N/a	New Village Arts Theatre, Carlsbad, California	
2018	BLISS (or Emily Post is Dead!)	Cassandra	Moxie Theatre, San Diego, California	
2019	The Ruby in Us	Young Ruby Bridges	Old Globe Theatre, San Diego, California	
2022	Rent	—N/a	Patio Playhouse Community Theatre, Escondido, California	

Accolades
List of awards and nominations
Event	Year	Award	Title	Result	Ref.
San Diego Theatre Critics Circle	2016	Craig Noel Award for Outstanding Featured Performance in a Musical, Female	Oklahoma!	Nominated	
Atlanta ShortsFest	2022	Best Ensemble Cast	We All Die Alone	Nominated	
Downtown Los Angeles Film Festival	2022	Best Ensemble Cast in a Short Film	We All Die Alone	Won	
San Diego Film Awards	2022	Best Ensemble Cast	We All Die Alone	Won	
Simply Indie Film Fest	2023	Best Ensemble Cast	We All Die Alone	Won	
