= Frank DiPalermo =

American actor

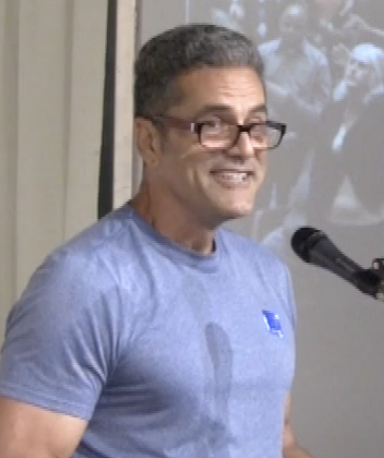
- DiPalermo in 2017
- Education: Vermont College of Fine Arts
- Occupations: Actor; playwright; poet
- Years active: 1987–present
- Known for: Public Transit, Private Parts; Something in Common; Common Human Being
- Notable credit: We All Die Alone

Frank DiPalermo is an American actor, playwright and poet known for the plays Public Transit, Private Parts (1996), Something in Common (1995), and Common Human Being (1990). Two of DiPalermo's poems were finalists for the Steve Kowit Poetry Prize and he earned several ensemble awards for We All Die Alone (2021).

== Personal life ==
DiPalermo earned a degree in Master of Fine Arts at Vermont College of Fine Arts in 2021.

== Career ==
In the 1990s, DiPalermo was the solo performer for five characters in two plays he wrote; Something in Common and Public Transit, Private Parts. He portrayed Frankie, Thommy or Tommy, Sonny or Sunny, Joe, and Rozz or Roz.

=== 1995: Something in Common ===
DiPalermo's play Something in Common premiered at Diversionary Theatre in San Diego, California. It was a one-man show where five characters interact at a bus stop. Pat Stein at North County Blade-Citizen praised DiPalermo's performances and writing. William Fark at Escondido Times-Advocate said the show "can still be tightened and polished."

=== 1996: Public Transit, Private Parts ===
DiPalermo's play Public Transit, Private Parts, which touched on topics of AIDS and Alzheimer's disease, premiered in San Diego before continuing at Theatre Rhinoceros in San Francisco, California. Chad Jones at Bay Area Reporter said it "is 30 minutes too long and tends to ramble" and praised DiPalermo's performance over writing.

=== 2010–2020 ===
In 2010, DiPalermo's "Body of Christ" was published in Slow Trains Literary Journal. His essay Diver Dan, initially titled A True State Of Grace, was broadcast on Living on Earth.

Kathy, a short film, is based on DiPalermo's experience as a gay man being raised in a religious environment. In 2020, DiPalermo's short story "The Friendship Gallery" was published in Beyond Words and a piece he wrote was published in Ruminate Magazine. Two of his essays were published in The Whole Alphabet: The Light and the Dark.

== Stage credits ==
Year	Title	Role	Location	Notes	Ref.
1987	Boys and Girls/Men and Women	Alex	Odyssey Theatre Ensemble, Los Angeles, California		
1988	Senior Prom	Performer	Ramp Theatre, Hollywood, California	co-starring Cynthia Geary	
1990	Common Human Being	Performer	Back Door Theatre, San Diego State University		
1991	The Heidi Chronicles	Peter	Gaslamp Quarter Theatre, San Diego, California		
1991	Circus Cafe	Performer	Fritz Theatre, San Diego, California		
1992	The American Clock	Lee	Old Globe Collaboration		
1995	Something in Common	Various	Diversionary Theatre, San Diego, California	Also writer	
1996	Public Transit, Private Parts	Various	San Diego and Theatre Rhinoceros	Also writer	
1997	A Midsummer-Night's Dream	Demetrius	Fritz Theatre, San Diego, California		
	Cafe Depresso	Brian	Sushi Performance Gallery, San Diego, California		
2022	Life Sucks	The Professor	Cygnet Theatre Company		

== Filmography ==
Year	Title	Role	Notes
2018	Kathy	—N/a	Writer
2021	We All Die Alone	Peter	

== Accolades ==
List of awards and nominations
Event	Year	Award	Title	Result	Ref.
San Diego Poetry Annual	2019–20	Steve Kowit Poetry Prize	The Danger of Moonglow	Finalist	
San Diego Poetry Annual	2019–20	Steve Kowit Poetry Prize	Hope	Finalist	
Atlanta ShortsFest	2022	Best Ensemble Cast	We All Die Alone	Nominated	
Downtown Film Festival Los Angeles	2022	Best Ensemble Cast	We All Die Alone	Won	
San Diego Film Awards	2022	Best Ensemble Cast	We All Die Alone	Won	
Simply Indie Film Fest	2023	Best Ensemble Cast	We All Die Alone	Won	
