= Samantha Ginn =

American actress

- Born: 1993 or 1994 (age 31–32)
- Other name: Sam Ginn
- Education: La Costa Canyon High School; Sonoma State University
- Occupations: Actress; stage director; playwright
- Years active: 2008–present
- Known for: Circle Circle Dot Dot
- Notable credits: The Mineola Twins; One Flew Over the Cuckoo's Nest; The Roommate; Well
- Awards: 2012 Craig Noel Award for Outstanding Featured Performance in a Play, Female

Samantha Ginn is an American actress, stage director, and playwright who directed a production of The Roommate (2023), appeared in productions of One Flew Over the Cuckoo's Nest (2013), Well (2017), The Mineola Twins (2021), and won a Craig Noel Award for Outstanding Featured Performance in a Play, Female for her role as Cari Lee in Hickorydickory (2012).

== Personal life ==
Ginn was born to Twila Ginn and grew up in New Jersey and Carlsbad, California. She began acting when she was 12, following diagnosis of Osgood–Schlatter disease which prevented her from pursuing a career as an athlete. Ginn attended La Costa Canyon High School and was a drama major at Sonoma State University. She later moved to University Heights, San Diego.

== Career ==
Ginn worked as a special education teacher for preschoolers in Solana Beach, California. She auditioned for The Real World and in 2011, Ginn founded Circle Circle Dot Dot, a theater production company in San Diego. In 2012, she won a Craig Noel Award for Outstanding Featured Performance in a Play, Female for her role as Cari Lee in Hickorydickory. In 2016, Ginn wrote "Giovanni & Charlie", one part of three 12 minute plays titled Bedrooms and Boyfriends for San Diego International Fringe Festival in which she shares a Best Writing Award with Michael Mizerany and Jonathan Hammond. Ginn later starred as the titular character in Hammond's short film Kathy.

== Stage credits ==
Year	Title	Role	Location	Notes
	Bye Bye Birdie			
2008	Noises Off	Poppy Norton-Taylor	Whittier Community Theatre, Whittier, California	
2008	Lobby Hero	Dawn	The Poway Performing Arts Company, Poway, California	
2009	All This and Moonlight	Andrea	Scripps Ranch Theatre, Alliant International University	By Charles R. Johnson
2011	Pardon Me, Prime Minister	Shirley Springer	The Poway Performing Arts Company, Poway, California	
2011	The Break-Up/Break-Down		The 10th Avenue Theatre, San Diego, California	
2011	Ragnarok	Bri	The 10th Avenue Theatre, San Diego, California	
2012	Almost, Maine		Scripps Ranch Theatre, Alliant International University	
2012	Coming Attractions	Anita Bryant	Moxie Theater, San Diego, California	World premiere, by Zsa Zsa Gershick
2012	Much Ado About Nothing	Ursula	New Village Arts Theatre, Carlsbad, California	
2012	Hickorydickory	Cari Lee	Moxie Theater, San Diego, California	
2013	The Master Forger		BLKBOX @ 6th & Penn, San Diego, California	
2013	One Flew Over the Cuckoo's Nest	Sandra	New Village Arts Theatre, Carlsbad, California	
2013	Scrooge in Rouge	Vesta	Diversionary Theatre, San Diego, California	
	Miss Firecracker Contest		New Village Arts Theatre, Carlsbad, California	
2014	San Diego, I Love You, 2.0			Playwright
2014	Edgar and Annabel	Tara	Ion Theatre, San Diego, California	
2014	Far Away		Ion Theatre, San Diego, California	
2015	Trouble in Mind	Judy Sears	Moxie Theater, San Diego, California	
2015	She-Rantulas from Outer Space in 3D!		Lynn Redgrave Theater, New York City	New York International Fringe Festival
2015	The Weir	Valerie	New Village Arts Theatre, Carlsbad, California	
2016	Bedrooms and Boyfriends	—N/a	Spreckels Theatre, San Diego, California	"Giovanni & Charlie" playwright for San Diego International Fringe Festival
2016	Seminar	Kate	Diversionary Theatre, San Diego, California	
2017	Well	Lisa Kron	Diversionary Theatre, San Diego, California	
2017	The Revolutionists	Charlotte Corday	Moxie Theater, San Diego, California	By Lauren Gunderson
2018	Falling	—N/a		Director
2018	Men on Boats	Hawkins	New Village Arts Theatre, Carlsbad, California	
2019	The Great Smelly, Slobbery, Small-Tooth Dog	—N/a	New Village Arts Theatre, Carlsbad, California	Director
2019	The Servant of Two Masters	Truffaldino	New Village Arts Theatre, Carlsbad, California	
2019	Around the World in 80 Days		New Village Arts Theatre, Carlsbad, California	
2021	The Mineola Twins	Mayra / Myrna	Moxie Theater, San Diego, California	
2022	Sapience		Moxie Theater, San Diego, California	Inclusion specialist, world premiere
2023	The Roommate	—N/a	New Village Arts Theatre, Carlsbad, California	Director
2024	Hand to God	Jessica / Jolene	Diversionary Theatre, San Diego, California	
2024	The Thanksgiving Play	Logan	New Village Arts Theatre, Carlsbad, California	

== Accolades ==
Event	Year	Title	Award	Result	Ref.
San Diego Theatre Critics Circle	2012	Hickorydickory	Craig Noel Award for Outstanding Featured Performance in a Play, Female	Won	
San Diego International Fringe Festival	2016	Bedrooms and Boyfriends	Best Writing Award	Won	
