= Patrick Mayuyu =

American actor and choreographer

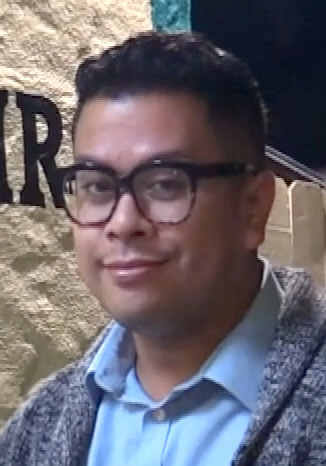
- Mayuyu in 2021
- Born: San Diego, California, U.S.
- Known for: Spring Awakening
- Notable credits: Avenue Q; Going to a Place Where You Already Are; Melancholy Play; We All Die Alone
- Awards: 2022 Best Ensemble Cast at Downtown Los Angeles Film Festival

Patrick Mayuyu is an American actor and choreographer who appeared in productions of Avenue Q (2015), Melancholy Play (2018), Going to a Place Where You Already Are (2020), and the films MascLooking (2025) and We All Die Alone (2021).

== Personal life ==
Mayuyu was born and raised in San Diego.

== Career ==
In 2018 Mayuyu co-founded MaArte Theatre Collective, a Fil-Am theater group in San Diego. He won an Aubrey Award for his choreography on the musical Spring Awakening at OnStage Playhouse in 2017. Mayuyu choreographed the San Diego State University Color Guard and was also a performance consultant. In 2022, Mayuyu was among the Best Ensemble Cast at Downtown Los Angeles Film Festival for his role in We All Die Alone by Jonathan Hammond. In 2025, he co-starred with Daniel Franzese in Hammond's short film MascLooking which premiered at Dances With Films.

== Stage credits ==
Year	Title	Role	Actor	Choreographer	Location	Notes
2010	The Rocky Horror Show	—N/a	No	Yes	OnStage Playhouse	
2011	Flower Drum Song: A Musical Revival in Concert		Yes	No	San Diego Asian American Repertory Theater	
2013	Ching Chong Chinaman		Yes	No	San Diego Asian American Repertory Theater	
2013	The 25th Annual Putnam County Spelling Bee	—N/a	No	Yes	OnStage Playhouse	
2015	Avenue Q	Bad Ideas Bear (Boy)	Yes	No	Coronado Playhouse, Coronado, California	
2017	Spring Awakening	—N/a	No	Yes	OnStage Playhouse	
	Bat Boy: The Musical		Yes	No	Ocean Beach Playhouse, Ocean Beach, California	
	The Taming of the Shrew		Yes	No	Diversionary Theatre, San Diego, California	
	A Chorus Line		Yes	No	Coronado Playhouse, Coronado, California	
	Revolt. She Said. Revolt Again.	—N/a	No	Yes	Diversionary Theatre, San Diego, California	
	Scrooge: The Musical	—N/a	No	Yes		
2018	A Man of No Importance	—N/a	No	Yes	Coronado Playhouse, Coronado, California	
2018	Melancholy Play	Frank	Yes	No	Diversionary Theatre, San Diego, California	
2018	Xanadu	—N/a	No	Yes	OnStage Playhouse	
2019	The Hour of Great Mercy	Joseph	Yes	No	Diversionary Theatre, San Diego, California	
2019	Carrie: The Musical	—N/a	No	Yes	OnStage Playhouse	
2020	Going to a Place Where You Already Are	Angel	Yes	No	OnStage Playhouse	
2024	Fun Home	—N/a	No	Yes	New Village Arts, Carlsbad, California	

== Accolades ==
Event / Festival	Year	Award	Title	Result	Ref.
Aubrey Awards	2018	Best Choreography	Spring Awakening	Won	
Idyllwild International Festival of Cinema	2022	Best Actor – Short Film	We All Die Alone	Nominated	
Downtown Los Angeles Film Festival	2022	Best Ensemble Cast	We All Die Alone	Won	
