= Steve Froehlich =

American actor

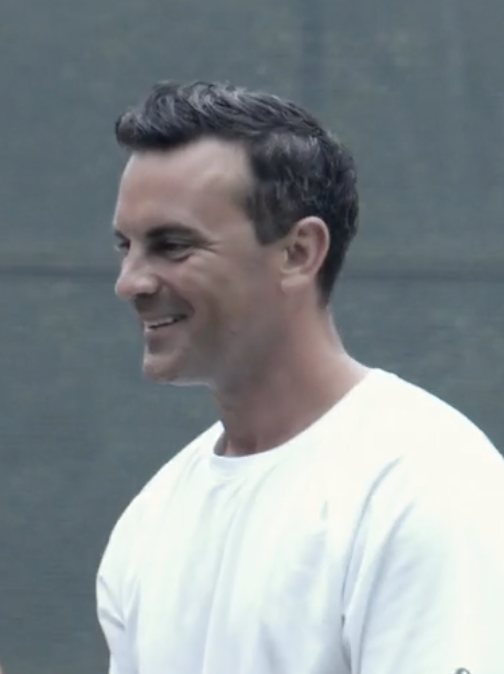
- Froehlich in Poverty of Will (2019)
- Other name: Steve Froelich
- Education: Williamsville North High School; San Diego State University
- Occupations: Actor; film producer; stunt coordinator
- Years active: 2010–present
- Known for: Bug; Disappearing Act; Marjorie Prime; Reasons to Be Pretty
- Notable credits: Our Lady of Kibeho; Sweat; The Taming of the Shrew; Touch

Steve Froehlich is an American actor who appeared in productions of Reasons to Be Pretty (2013), Bug (2014), Disappearing Act (2016) at San Diego International Fringe Festival, Marjorie Prime (2017); the West Coast premieres of Our Lady of Kibeho (2016), and The House Theatre of Chicago's adaptation of The Nutcracker (2014); and in the films Touch (2022), and Forgotten Hero (2017) as Commander Claire Elwood.

== Personal life ==
Froehlich played baseball at Williamsville North High School and later in the NCAA Division I Football Bowl Subdivision. He attended San Diego State University in 2007.

== Career ==
In 2011, Froehlich was a contributing writer for Pacific San Diego Magazine and vice president of business development for BOSU Fitness. He made his theatre debut in 2013 for Ion Theatre's production of Reasons to Be Pretty by Neil LaBute. Froehlich portrayed Alex in InnerMission Productions' 2015 production of Disappearing Act by Delia Knight and reprised the role in 2016 at the San Diego International Fringe Festival. In 2017, he portrayed Walter Prime in North Coast Repertory Theatre's production of Marjorie Prime by Jordan Harrison.

== Stage credits ==
Year	Title	Role	Location	Notes
2013	Reasons to Be Pretty	Greg	Ion Theatre, San Diego, California	
2014	Bug	Peter	Ion Theatre, San Diego, California	
2014	The Nutcracker	David	New Village Arts Theatre, Carlsbad, California	West Coast premiere for The House Theatre of Chicago's adaptation featuring Edred Utomi, Brian Patrick Butler and Jennifer Paredes
2015	Orange Julius	Ol’ Boy	Moxie Theatre, La Mesa, California	by Basil Kreimendahl
2015	Disappearing Act	Alex	Diversionary Theatre, San Diego, California	by Delia Knight and InnerMission Productions
2016	Disappearing Act	Alex	The Geoffrey Off Broadway at Spreckels Theatre, San Diego International Fringe Festival	Reprisal
2016	Our Lady of Kibeho	Father Flavia	Moxie Theatre, La Mesa, California	West Coast premiere
2016	The Taming of the Shrew	Petruchio	Diversionary Theatre, San Diego, California	
2017	Marjorie Prime	Walter Prime	North Coast Repertory Theatre, Solana Beach, California	by Jordan Harrison
2018	BLISS (or Emily Post is Dead!)	Apollo / Doctor	Moxie Theatre, La Mesa, California	by Jami Brandli featuring Alexandra Slade
2019	Sweat	Jason	San Diego Repertory Theatre, San Diego, California	
2024	A View from the Bridge	Mike / Tony / Second Immigration Officer / Fight Captain	North Coast Repertory Theatre, Solana Beach, California	

== Filmography ==
Feature films
Year	Title	Role	Notes
2010	Finding Sky	Tyler 'T-Bone'	
2013	Baseball's Last Hero: 21 Clemente Stories	Dick Groat	
2013	Revelation Road: The Beginning of the End	Richie	Featuring David A. R. White, Ray Wise and Brian Bosworth
2020	Beverly Hills Bandits	Wesley	Featuring Natasha Alam and Ron Jeremy, also stunt coordinator

Short films
Year	Title	Role	Notes
2012	Blood Brothers	Jonah Gilmore	Episode: "Street Life", also co-executive producer
2014	I.O.U.	Rick	
2014	Voices of Midway	Pilot #4	Written by Richard Christian Matheson and featuring Matt Hoyt
2017	Forgotten Hero	Commander Claire Elwood	Featuring Randy Davison and Larry Poole
2017	Thin Lines	New Date	
2018	HR 805	Chris Bower	TV Pilot episode featuring Sara Wolfkind
2018	Revoked	AGS Agent McMullen	
2018	Emerald Portal –OneHundredTwenty	Clerk	Music video by Justin Burquist
2019	Poverty of Will	Don Juan the Tennis Coach	Featuring Caroline Amiguet and Suzana Norberg
2019	Bathsheba	Chris	
2022	A Celebration of Life	Paul Bryant	
2022	Touch	Killer	
2023	Just Married - Italian Style	Mickey Boombatz	
2023	Before I Call You Mother	Steve	
2025	The Truth About Susie		Selected for San Diego International Film Festival

== Accolades ==
Festival / Event	Year	Award	Title	Result	Ref.
National Academy of Television Arts and Sciences	2025	Pacific Southwest Emmy Award – Arts/Entertainment - Short Form or Long Form Content	Anchorman Parody-Made For San Diego Film Awards 2024	Nominated	
National Academy of Television Arts and Sciences	2025	Pacific Southwest Emmy Award – Special Event Coverage	San Diego Film Awards	Nominated	
