= Francis Gercke =

- Other name: Fran Gercke
- Occupations: Stage actor; stage director; artistic director; playwright
- Years active: 1998–present
- Known for: Co-founder of New Village Arts Theatre and Backyard Renaissance
- Notable credits: Desire Under the Elms; God of Carnage; Man from Nebraska; Noises Off; Proof
- Spouses: Kristianne Kurner; Jessica John (m. 2015)
- Children: 1

Francis "Fran" Gercke is an American actor, director and playwright who appeared in productions of The Only Game in Town (2002), A Hatful of Rain (2002), Proof (2003 & 2023), Noises Off (2018), and wrote the play The Dark Heart of Dooley Stevens (2025).

== Personal life ==
Gercke graduated from Actors Studio Drama School at the New School for Social Research. While there, he met Kristianne Kurner who he married. They had a son together, filmmaker Jonah Gercke. Gercke later married Jessica John.

== Career ==
In 2001, Gercke and Kurner founded New Village Arts Theatre in Carlsbad, California.

In 2015, Gercke and Jessica John founded Backyard Renaissance, a production company in which John is the executive director and Gercke is the artistic director.

In 2020, Gercke wrote the play The Dark Heart of Dooley Stevens.

== Stage credits ==
Year	Title	Role	Location	Notes
1998	Three Tales by Hans Christian Andersen	Various	Encino Community Center, Los Angeles, California	"The Swineherd," "The Emperor's New Clothes" and "The Princess and the Pea."
2001	Four Play		New Village Arts, Carlsbad, California	
2001	Brilliant Traces		New Village Arts Theatre, Carlsbad, California	
2002	A Hatful of Rain	Johnny Pope	New Village Arts Theatre, Carlsbad, California	Outstanding Performance, also director
2002	The Merchant of Venice	Lorenzo	San Diego Repertory Theatre	
2002	As You Like It		New Village Arts Theatre, Carlsbad, California	
2002	The Only Game in Town	Joe	New Village Arts Theatre, Carlsbad, California	Outstanding Performance
2003	Proof	Hal	San Diego Repertory Theatre	
2003	Uncle Vanya	—N/a	New Village Arts Theatre, Carlsbad, California	Director
2006	Hamlet	Prince Hamlet	New Village Arts Theatre, Carlsbad, California	Shakespeare in the Park at La Costa Canyon High School
2007	Desire Under the Elms	Eben Cabot	Cygnet Theatre, San Diego, California	
2007	Off the Ground	Joel	New Village Arts Theatre, Carlsbad, California	
2008	This is Our Youth	—N/a	New Village Arts Theatre, Carlsbad, California	Director
2008	Hysterical Blindness	—N/a	Cygnet Theatre, San Diego, California	Director, Backyard Production
2008	A Number	Bernard / B2 / Michael Black	Cygnet Theatre, San Diego, California	
2009	Man from Nebraska	—N/a	Cygnet Theatre, San Diego, California	Director
2010	Hurlyburly	Eddie	Ion Theatre, San Diego, California	
2010	Ring Round the Moon	Gigolo	Ion Theatre, San Diego, California	
2012	Ripples from Walden Pond	Thoreau	Cygnet Theatre, San Diego, California	
2014	I Hate Hamlet	Andrew Rally	Intrepid Theatre, Encinitas, California	
2015	The Behavior of Broadus	Watson	Capital Stage, Sacramento, California	
2015	Parlour Song	Dale	BLKBOX Theatre, Hillcrest, San Diego	Backyard Renaissance debut
2016	The Elephant Man	Joseph Merrick	Sunshine Brooks Theatre, Oceanside, California	Backyard Renaissance, also co-directed with Christopher Williams
2016	Gutenberg! The Musical!	—N/a	Diversionary Theatre, University Heights, San Diego	Backyard Renaissance, producer
2018	Smokefall	Daniel	Theodore and Adele Shank Theatre, La Jolla Playhouse	
2018	Noises Off	Lloyd Dallas	Lamb's Players Theatre, Coronado, California	
2021	Dry Powder	—N/a	Backyard Renaissance Theater, San Diego	Stage director, filmed play during the COVID-19 pandemic
2023	Proof	Robert	Backyard Renaissance Theater, San Diego	Portraying a different character from the same David Auburn play he was in in 2003
2023	God of Carnage	Alan	Tenth Avenue Arts Center, Downtown San Diego	
2024	How I Learned To Drive	Uncle Peck	Backyard Renaissance Theater, San Diego	
2025	The Dark Heart of Dooley Stevens	—N/a	Tenth Avenue Arts Center, Downtown San Diego	Backyard Renaissance, also playwright and artistic director
2025	A Streetcar Named Desire	Stanley Kowalski	Backyard Renaissance Theater, San Diego	

== Accolades ==
Event	Year	Award	Title	Result	Ref.
San Diego Theatre Critics Circle	2010	Craig Noel Award for Outstanding Lead Performance in a Play, Male	Hurlyburly	Nominated	
San Diego Theatre Critics Circle	2024	Craig Noel Award for Outstanding Lead Performance in a Play, Male	Misery	Nominated	
