= Shannon Taylor (producer) =

American film producer and musician

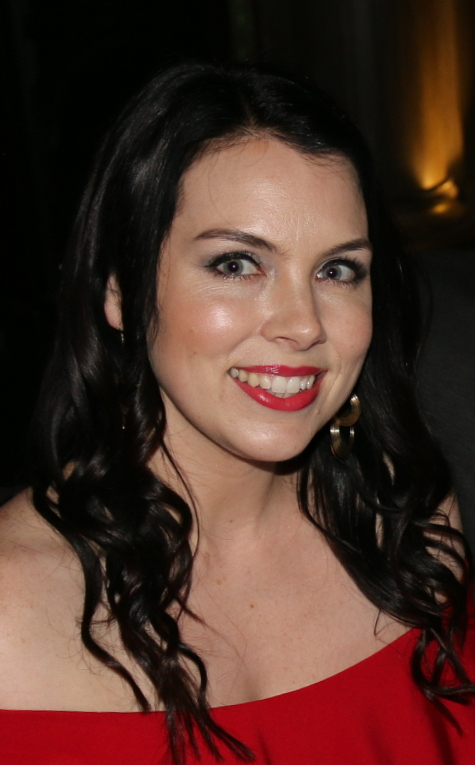
- Taylor in 2019
- Born: Shannon Christine Taylor; 1985 or 1986 (age 39–40); Orange County, California, U.S.
- Education: San Diego Christian College
- Occupations: Film producer; keyboardist; vocalist; actress
- Years active: 2012–present
- Awards: 2022 Pacific Southwest Emmy Award

Shannon Christine Taylor is an American film producer and musician, best known for producing We All Die Alone (2021), We Are West Valley Water District (2022), and Be Water Wise (2022). For her work, she has won a Pacific Southwest Emmy Award in 2022 from three nominations.

A graduate of San Diego Christian College, she previously performed as a vocalist and keyboardist in a Christian rock band called Sorrow Underfoot with her siblings, having played the Spirit West Coast music festival and toured Southern California and Russia between 2006 and 2008.

== Filmography ==
Year	Title	Actor	Producer	Role	Notes
2012	Oblivion: Story of the Unseen Girl	No	No	—N/a	Co-director and co-editor
2019	The Flourish	Yes	Yes	Theresa	Also director
2019	The Perfect Life	Yes	No	Belle Salvati	
2019	Bathsheba	Yes	Executive	Chloe	
2019	Waylay	Yes	Yes	Edith	
2020	Wedding Screeners	Yes	No	Rhonda	
2021	We All Die Alone	No	Yes	—N/a	Also 2nd assistant director
2022	Some Like it Hot	No	Yes	—N/a	TV Special parody directed by Jonathan Hammond

== Accolades ==
Event	Year	Title	Award	Result	Ref.
National Academy of Television Arts and Sciences	2022	We Are West Valley Water District	Pacific Southwest Emmy Award for Informational/Instructional Program	Won	
National Academy of Television Arts and Sciences	2022	We Are West Valley Water District	Pacific Southwest Emmy Award for Director – Short Form Content	Nominated	
National Academy of Television Arts and Sciences	2022	Be Water Wise	Pacific Southwest Emmy Award for Informational/Instructional Program	Nominated	
