= Charles Klusmann =

American fighter pilot (1933–2024)

- Born: September 7, 1933; San Diego, California, U.S.
- Died: October 3, 2024 (aged 91)
- Burial place: Barrancas National Cemetery
- Spouse: Ellen
- Military career
- Allegiance: United States
- Branch: United States Navy
- Service years: 1953–1980
- Rank: Captain
- Nickname: Chuck
- Conflicts: Vietnam War
- Awards: Distinguished Flying Cross; Purple Heart; Meritorius Service Medal (2)

Charles Frederick Klusmann (September 7, 1933 – October 3, 2024) was an American military United States Navy combat pilot who was shot down over Laos during the Vietnam War and later escaped captivity.

== Military career ==
=== Shoot down, capture and escape ===
Klusmann was a navy lieutenant (O-3) when he was shot down over the Plain of Jars, Laos (19°28′00″N 103°15′00″E) on June 6, 1964, flying an RF-8A Crusader aircraft from the VFP-63, USS Kitty Hawk. He was the first airman shot down and captured by the Pathet Lao and the first to escape three months later, on August 30. He was rescued two days later by CIA Officer Terrence Michael "Terry" Burke. This is notable because the United States government never negotiated for the release of any prisoners held in Laos, and so, not one American held in Laos at the end of the war was ever released (The only other American to be rescued after escape from captivity in Laos was Navy Lieutenant Dieter Dengler). By September 4, he was flown to San Diego, California and reunited with his wife.

=== Awards and decorations ===
Klusmann's military awards and decorations include the Distinguished Flying Cross and Prisoner of War Medal.

Naval Aviator Badge
Distinguished Flying Cross
Purple Heart	Meritorious Service Medal w/ 5/16" gold star	Navy and Marine Corps Commendation Medal w/ 5/16" gold star
Combat Action Ribbon	Prisoner of War Medal	National Defense Service Medal w/ 3/16" service star
Armed Forces Expeditionary Medal	Vietnam Service Medal w/ 3/16" campaign star	Navy Sea Service Deployment Ribbon
Navy and Marine Corps Overseas Service Ribbon	Republic of Vietnam Gallantry Cross Unit Citation w/ palm and frame	Vietnam Campaign Medal

His Distinguished Flying Cross citation reads:

For extraordinary heroism and achievement while participating in aerial flight during May and June 1964. Lieutenant Klusmann, attached to and serving with Light Photographic Squadron SIXTY-THREE, Detachment C, aboard USS KITTY HAWK (CVA-63) has been engaged in unarmed reconnaissance flights over Laos in the Plaines des Jarres area. On 21 May 1964, his first flight into the area, his aircraft was struck by ground fire, and burned for a period of 20 minutes. Exercising superior airmanship, he was able to return safely to his ship. On 6 June 1964, on another low-level flight, his aircraft was shot down about 10 miles south of the Pathet Lao stronghold of Ban Ban on Route 7 east of the Plaines des Jarres at noon local time. Lieutenant Klusmann ejected from his aircraft and was observed on the ground. An attempt was made to rescue him by helicopter from a clearing, but as the helicopter approached the area Lieutenant Klusmann, exhibiting heroism of the highest order, waved it off. Almost immediately, he was observed to be surrounded by Pathet Lao troops. The rescue helicopter was subjected to ground fire and one of its occupants was wounded before it could depart the area. Subsequently, the Chinese Communist radio announced that the Pathet Lao had captured Lieutenant Klusmann. Lieutenant Klusmann's unswerving devotion to duty, professional skill, and courage were in keeping with the highest traditions of the United States Naval Service.

== Personal life, retirement and death ==
Klusmann retired from the U.S. Navy as a captain in 1980. A father of two children and a grandfather of three, he retired to Pensacola, where he had undergone flight training in the Navy, in 1956. He died on October 3, 2024, at the age of 91.

== See also ==
- List of people from San Diego, California
- Robert McNamara as Secretary of Defense § Downing of Charles Klusmann over Laos
- U.S. prisoners of war during the Vietnam War
