= Kimberly Weinberger =

American actress

- Born: Sacramento, California
- Other name: Kimmy Weinberger
- Education: Oak Ridge High School; San Diego State University
- Occupation: Actress
- Years active: 2003–present
- Known for: Hemet, or the Landlady Don't Drink Tea
- Notable credits: After the End; Blackbird; Gloria; I Ought to Be in Pictures
- Awards: Best Actress at SDSU's 2012 Campus MovieFest
- Website: kimberlyweinberger.com

Kimberly Weinberger is an American actress who appeared in stage productions of After the End (2015), I Ought to Be in Pictures (2017), Blackbird (2019), Gloria (2024) and starred in the film Hemet, or the Landlady Don't Drink Tea (2023). She won Best Actress at the 2012 Campus MovieFest at San Diego State University.

== Early life and education ==
Weinberger was born in Sacramento, California, and attended Oak Ridge High School. She later attended San Diego State University, graduating cum laude in 2016 with a degree in theater arts.

== Career ==
Weinberger began acting at an early age, performing in plays like Fiddler on the Roof, Peter Pan, Annie, and And Then There Were None.

In 2023, she appeared in the West Coast premiere of Public Enemy by David Harrower in San Diego. Weinberger also co-starred with Brian Patrick Butler and Aimee La Joie in the dark comedy film Hemet, or the Landlady Don't Drink Tea directed by Tony Olmos. Her character Rosie Perkins is the film's protagonist and critics praised her performance, saying that she is one of the strengths of the film.

In 2024, Weinberger appeared in a production of Gloria at OnStage Playhouse and was cast in the film A Corpse in Kensington with Michael Madsen and Ryan Bollman.

== Stage credits ==
Year	Title	Role	Location	Notes
2003	Fiddler on the Roof	—N/a	Imagination Theater, Placerville, California	
2004	Annie	Orphan chorus	Imagination Theater, Placerville, California	
2006	Peter Pan	—N/a	Imagination Theater, Placerville, California	
2007	Joseph and the Amazing Technicolor Dreamcoat	—N/a	Rancho Cordova Theater, Rancho Cordova, California	
2008	The Wiz	—N/a	Oak Ridge High School Theater	
2012	And Then There Were None	Vera Claythrone	Oak Ridge High School Theater	
2015	After the End	Louise	T24 Drama Society, University of Kent	
2015	Vanya and Sonia and Masha and Spike	Nina	Coronado Playhouse, Coronado, California	
2017	I Ought to Be in Pictures	Libby Tucker	Patio Playhouse, Escondido, California	
2019	Blackbird	Una	City Heights Performance Annex, San Diego, California	The Poolhouse Project production
2022	LARPing	Britta/Jenny	Trinity Theatre Company, San Diego, California	World premiere
2023	Public Enemy	Petra Stockmann	New Fortune Theatre Company, San Diego, California	West Coast premiere, David Harrower adaptation of An Enemy of the People
2024	Gloria	Ani	OnStage Playhouse	
2025	The Effect	Connie	OnStage Playhouse	
2025	The Strangers	Emily	Old Town Theatre, Old Town San Diego State Historic Park	West Coast Premiere of Chalk Circle Collective production, based on Our Town by Thornton Wilder
2026	Rabbit Hole	Izzy	Trinity Theatre Company, San Diego, California	
2026	Romeo and Juliet	Mercutio	Old Poway Park, Poway, California	Part of Bards with Blades at Poway Shakespeare for San Diego International Fringe Festival
2026	Isaac's Eye	Catherine	OnStage Playhouse	

== Filmography ==
Year	Title	Role	
2012	The Choice	—N/a	
2019	Apparition	Waitress	
2019	Phase	—N/a	Short film, writer and director
2021	Notorious Nick	Waitress	
2023	Hemet, or the Landlady Don't Drink Tea	Rosie Perkins	
2025	Into the Night	Kelsey	
TBA	A Corpse in Kensington †	Beatrice Villeneuve	

Key
†	Denotes films that have not yet been released

== Accolades ==
Festival / Event	Year	Title	Award	Result	Ref.
Campus MovieFest	2012	The Choice	Best Actress – San Diego State University	Won	
San Diego Film Awards	2020	Phase	Best Direction: Narrative Short Film	Nominated	
San Diego Film Awards	2020	Phase	Best Writing: Narrative Short Film	Nominated	
San Diego Film Awards	2024	Hemet, or the Landlady Don't Drink Tea	Best Ensemble	Nominated	
Carmel International Film Festival	2025	Into the Night	Best Actress	Nominated	
