= The Legend of Georgia McBride =

American play written by Matthew Lopez

- Original language: English
- Written by: Matthew Lopez
- Characters: Casey; Jo; Miss Tracy Mills; Rexy; Jason; Eddie
- Subject: Drag Performance
- Genre: Comedy

Premiere
- Date: January 2014
- Place: Denver Center for the Performing Arts

The Legend of Georgia McBride is a 2014 American play written by Matthew Lopez.

== Plot ==
Casey, a young Elvis Presley impersonator barely making a living, finds a path to prosperity by becoming a lip-syncing drag queen. He's young, he's broke, his landlord's knocking at the door, and he's just found out his wife is pregnant. To make matters even more desperate, Casey is fired from his gig as an Elvis impersonator in a run-down, small-town Florida bar. When the bar owner brings in a B-level drag show to replace his act, Casey finds that he has a whole lot to learn about show business—and himself.

== Productions ==
The Legend of Georgia McBride premiered at the Denver Center for the Performing Arts in January 2014. The production was directed by Mike Donahue. That production was subsequently produced Off-Broadway at MCC Theater, opening in September 2015, again directed by Mike Donahue, featuring choreography by Paul McGill. The play ran at the Geffen Playhouse in Los Angeles from April to May 2017, directed by Donahue with McGill's choreography.

The play has been produced at Marin Theatre Company in 2017 in Mill Valley, California, directed by Kent Gash, the Arden Theatre in Philadelphia in October to December 4, 2016, directed by Emmanuelle Delpech, at Redwood Curtain Theatre in Humboldt County, directed by Shea King, and at ACT in Seattle in 2017, directed by David Bennett.

The play was produced at Cygnet Theatre Company in 2017 in San Diego, California and Hippodrome State Theatre in Gainesville, Florida as a part of the fall portion of their 2017/2018 seasons.

The Southwest Regional premiere was produced at Uptown Players in Dallas, Texas in December 2017.

The Hawaii premiere of the play was by Manoa Valley Theatre in Honolulu in November 2017.

In 2018, The Legend of Georgia McBride was produced at the Guthrie Theater, under the direction of Jeffrey Meanza and running from June 16 to August 26.

Round House Theatre in Bethesda, Maryland produced The Legend of Georgia McBride in June to July 1, 2018, directed by Tom Story.

Flying Anvil Theatre in Knoxville, Tennessee, staged their production of the play from May 30, 2018, to June 24, 2018.

Los Altos Stage presented the play September 6 to 30, 2018 in Los Altos, California. B Street Theatre at The Sofia in Sacramento, California produced the play from November 6 to December 9, 2018, directed by Jerry Montoya.

The Central Florida premiere of The Legend of Georgia McBride ran from January 18 - February 3, 2019 at the Garden Theatre in Winter Garden, Florida.

Vermont Stage ran the play April 17-May 5, 2019 at the Black Box Theatre in Burlington, Vermont, starring Irving Green, Bob Bolyard, Larry Connolly, Britt Michael Gordon, and Lia-Shea Tillett.

The Connecticut premiere took place at the Seven Angels Theater in Waterbury, Connecticut on November 7, 2019, where it ran until December 1.

With its premiere at Bavarias state theater Staatstheater Nürnberg on January 25, 2020, the play was performed for the first time in Germany.

The Barnstormers Playhouse in Tamworth, NH produced it as part of their 2022 season, running from July 14 - July 23.

The play will have its West End premiere @sohoplace in London, starring Monét X Change and directed by Stevie Walker-Webb, running from 2 February to 15 May 2027.

== Awards and nominations ==
Year	Award	Category	Work	Result	Ref.
2016	Drama Desk Awards	Outstanding Featured Actor in a Play	Matt McGrath	Nominated	
2016	Drama Desk Awards	Outstanding Wig and Hair	Jason Hayes	Nominated	
2016	Drama Desk Awards	Outstanding Costume Design	Anita Yavich	Won	
2016	Outer Critics Circle Awards	Outstanding New Off-Broadway Play		Nominated	
2016	Outer Critics Circle Awards	Outstanding Director of a Play	Mike Donahue	Nominated	
2016	Outer Critics Circle Awards	Lucille Lortel Award for New Director	Mike Donahue	Nominated	
2016	Lucille Lortel Awards	Outstanding Featured Actor in a Play	Matt McGrath	Won	
2016	Lucille Lortel Awards	Outstanding Choreographer	Paul McGill	Nominated	
2016	Lucille Lortel Awards	Outstanding Costume Design	Anita Yavich	Won	
2016	Lucille Lortel Awards	Outstanding Lighting Design	Ben Stanton	Nominated	
2016	Hewes Design Award	Best Costume Design	Anita Yavich	Nominated	

Source: Internet Off-Broadway database
