= Jonathan Hammond (filmmaker) =

American filmmaker

- Hammond in 2019
- Born: Jonathan Brandon Hammond; Decatur, Illinois, U.S.
- Education: Eisenhower High School; University of Illinois Urbana-Champaign; New York University Tisch School of the Arts
- Occupations: Film director; film editor; screenwriter; film producer
- Years active: 2018–present
- Known for: Expect A Miracle: Finding Light in the Darkness of a Pandemic; Isabel; Kathy
- Notable work: Fireflies in the Dusk; We All Die Alone
- Parent: Belva Gadlage (mother)
- Awards: List of Awards
- Website: jonathanhammond.org

Jonathan Brandon Hammond is an American film director, film editor, screenwriter and film producer who directed the films Expect A Miracle: Finding Light in the Darkness of a Pandemic (2020), Isabel (2018), Kathy (2018), We All Die Alone (2021), and Fireflies in the Dusk (2025). Hammond won the Copper Wing Award for short film directing at the Phoenix Film Festival, a Best Writing Award at San Diego International Fringe Festival, and received multiple nominations for a Pacific Southwest Emmy Award at National Academy of Television Arts and Sciences.

== Early life ==
Hammond is the son of Joseph and Belva Gadlage. A grant recipient from National Endowment for the Arts, he grew up in Decatur, Illinois and attended Eisenhower High School. In 1994, Hammond graduated from Richland Community College with an Associate in Arts degree, later studying at University of Illinois and New York University Tisch School of the Arts. He relocated to San Diego and later to Los Angeles.

== Career ==
Hammond has cited influences from the works of Steven Spielberg, Alfonso Cuarón, Quentin Tarantino, and Taika Waititi. His film Expect A Miracle depicts San Diego's handle on AIDS in the 1980s, a time where sexual orientation towards the same gender was confined.

Hammond was a panelist at San Diego Comic-Con and compared being selected to screen his film Kathy there as exciting as having an Emmy nomination. He was a judge for the Minneapolis 48 Hour Film Project in 2020 and his film Before depicted a dinner party within the COVID-19 pandemic.

Hammond and Jodi Cilley talked about the challenges faced when recruiting talent when turning true local stories into films. He is part of an expanded network of LGBT filmmakers who have influence to project styles of horror.

=== Kathy short film ===
Kathy is a 2018 horror short film directed by Hammond and written by Hammond and Ryan Roach. The film stars Samantha Ginn, Cristyn Chandler, Suzana Norberg, Frank DiPalermo and Jared Sarvis, and was made in San Diego. The story was originally written as non-fiction about a gay local writer's early life within his strict, faithful family. It was then redrafted as a horror film, taking place in the 1980s. Hammond mentioned being influenced on inspecting important topics of interest to come up with characters of a different degree. Kathy screened at Horrible Imaginings Film Festival, Catalina Film Festival, Comic-Con International Independent Film Festival, FilmOut San Diego, Indie Short Fest, San Diego Film Week and IndieX Film Fest. It was distributed by Alter.

=== 2020s short films ===
Hammond's short film We All Die Alone, co-written by Ryan Roach, premiered at FilmOut San Diego in 2021. It won 12 awards across over 50 festivals. Its cast includes Brian Patrick Butler, Joshua Alan Jones, Patrick Mayuyu, Alexandra Slade, and it was inspired by the works of Quentin Tarantino, Brian De Palma, Martin Scorsese and Edgar Wright. Film Threat praised the film, scoring it 8 out of 10.

Hammond's films MascLooking and Fireflies in the Dusk premiered in 2025 at Dances with Films and the Cleveland International Film Festival. Fireflies in the Dusk featured Emily Goss, Hale Appleman, Drew Droege, Amy Yasbeck, and it was produced by Martin Spanjers with cinematography by Elle Schneider.

== Filmography ==
Short films
Year	Title	Director	Writer	Producer	Editor	Notes
2018	Kathy	Yes	Co-writer	Yes	No	
2018	Isabel	Yes	Co-writer	Yes	Yes	
2020	Expect a Miracle: Finding Light in the Darkness of a Pandemic	Yes	Yes	Yes	Yes	TV film
2021	We All Die Alone	Yes	Co-writer	Executive	No	
2022	Some Like It Hot	Yes	Co-writer	No	—N/a	
2025	Fireflies in the Dusk	Yes	Co-writer	No	No	

== Accolades ==
Event	Year	Award	Title	Result	Notes
San Diego International Fringe Festival	2016	Best Writing Award	Bedrooms and Boyfriends	Won	Shared with Michael Mizerany and Samantha Ginn
National Academy of Television Arts and Sciences	2019	Pacific Southwest Emmy Award	Isabel	Nominated	
National Academy of Television Arts and Sciences	2021	Pacific Southwest Emmy Award	Expect A Miracle: Finding Light in the Darkness of a Pandemic	Nominated	
Burbank International Film Festival	2022	Best LGBTQ Short Film	We All Die Alone	Won	
GI Film Festival San Diego	2022	Local Choice Award	We All Die Alone	Won	
GI Film Festival San Diego	2022	Best Local Narrative Short	We All Die Alone	Nominated	
Idyllwild International Festival of Cinema	2022	Indie Spirit Award	We All Die Alone	Won	
Idyllwild International Festival of Cinema	2022	Best Short Film	We All Die Alone	Nominated	
Idyllwild International Festival of Cinema	2022	Best Director – Short Film	We All Die Alone	Nominated	
Idyllwild International Festival of Cinema	2022	Best Screenplay – Short Film	We All Die Alone	Nominated	
Oceanside International Film Festival	2022	Best Narrative Short Film	We All Die Alone	Nominated	
Phoenix Film Festival	2022	Copper Wing Award – Best LGBTQIA+ Directed Short	We All Die Alone	Won	
