= Steve Kowit =

American poet

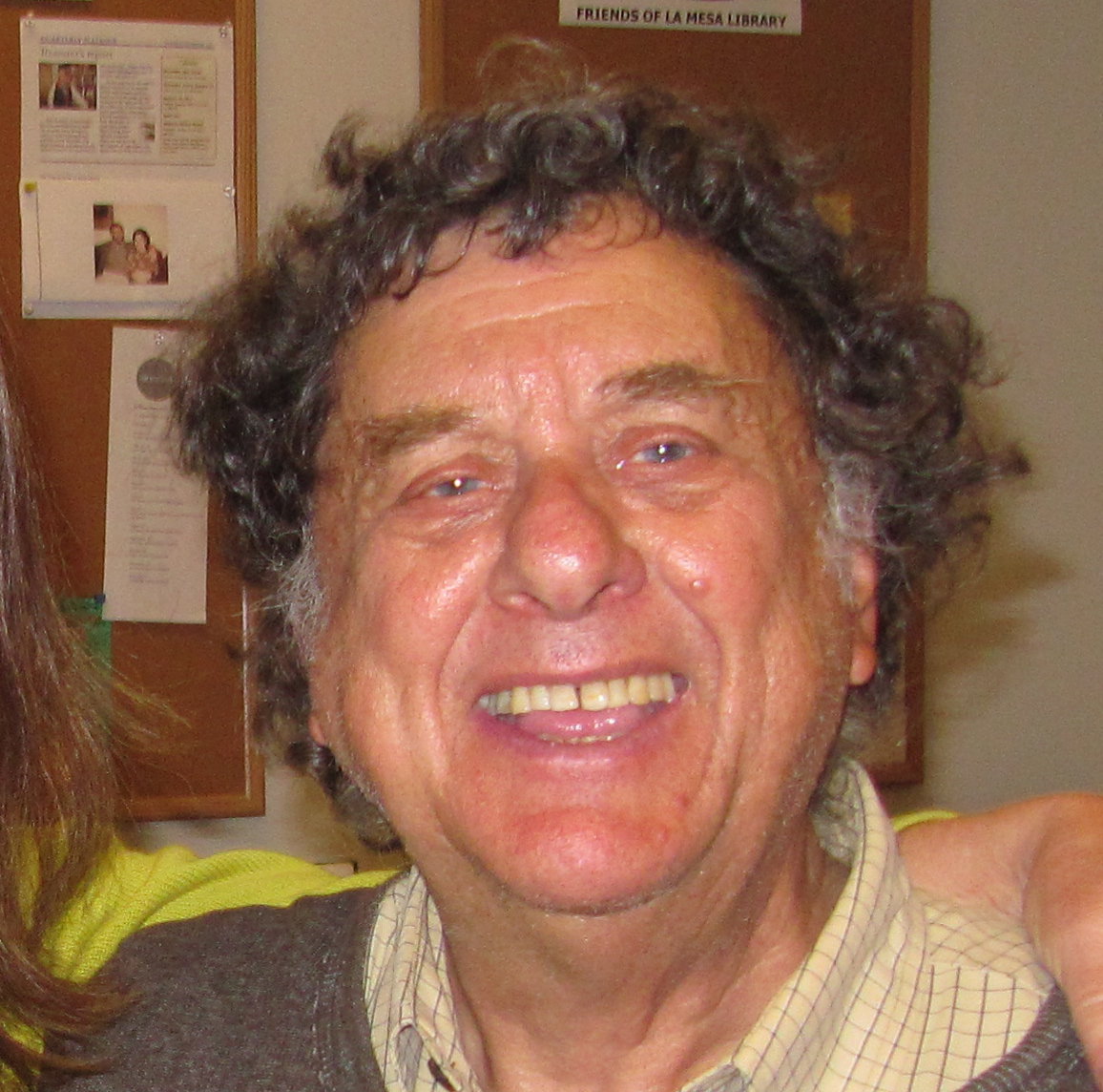
- Kowit in 2011
- Born: June 30, 1938; Brooklyn, New York; United States
- Died: April 2, 2015 (aged 77); Potrero, California
- Education: Brooklyn College
- Occupations: poet, author, teacher

Steve Kowit (June 30, 1938 – April 2, 2015) was an American poet, essayist, educator, and human-rights advocate.

He received multiple awards for his poetry.

== Biography ==
Kowit was born in Brooklyn, New York where as a young man he frequently gave poetry readings at coffee houses. After a stint in the Army Reserve, he earned his BA from Brooklyn College. He moved to San Francisco at the age of 27 spending time in the Haight-Ashbury district. Kowit earned a MA at San Francisco State College (now San Francisco State University) when he was 30. After refusing Army induction at the beginning of the Vietnam War – or as Kowit called it, "America's genocidal slaughter of the Vietnamese people" – he traveled to Mexico, Central and South America with his wife, Mary. After the war Kowit returned to the States and resided in San Diego.

In San Diego he started teaching Poetry Writing in his Ocean Beach, San Diego home in the late 1970s. He went on to teach classes at San Diego State University, University of California, San Diego and Southwestern College. His poetry workshops in public schools were acclaimed for "making writing fun."

Writing in the San Francisco Examiner, Sheila Farr wrote of Kowit's poetry:

An easy charmer in his book The Dumbbell Nebula, Steve Kowit backs up the bantering narratives of a coffeehouse poet with drop-dead images and subtle control ... Kowit's work grows out of the Beat tradition, speaking obliquely and directly of its heroes ... Kowit doesn't get stuck there in self-satisfied beatdom, though, because he can't take himself seriously for long enough. He tickles heavy subjects into giggles of submission without making them look trivial or foolish. Kowit seems to enjoy toying with sound and rhythm, like a cat patting at a spider, and is partial to slant rhymes hidden in unruly cadences. He folds his content into soft mouthfuls of sound ... the poems grow more delicious in their crazy daring, epitomizing Kowit's own particular sidelong, silly way of approaching the truth.

== Awards ==
- National Endowment for the Arts Fellowship in Poetry
- Two Pushcart Prizes
- The Atlanta Review Paumanok Poetry Prize
- The Oroborus Book Award
- The San Diego Book Award
- The Tampa Review Poetry Prize
- San Diego Book Awards Theodor S. Geisel Award for The Gods of Rapture, 2007

== Bibliography ==
Kowit reads his poem "Basic"

- Incitement to Nixonicide by Pablo Neruda, Steve Kowit (Translator) (French & European Publications, 2002) ISBN 0960030638
- The Maverick Poets: An Anthology by Steve Kowit (Editor), Kim Addonizio (Author) (Contributor), Wanda Coleman (Contributor), Billy Collins (Contributor) published 1988
- In the Palm of Your Hand: A Poet's Portable Workshop: a Lively and Illuminating Guide for the Practicing Poet (Tilbury House, 1995) ISBN 0884481492
- The Dumbbell Nebula (1999)
- The First Noble Truth (2007)
- Cutting Our Losses (Contact II Publications, 1982)
- Lurid Confessions (Carpenter Press, 1983)
- The Gods of Rapture: Poems in the Erotic Mood (San Diego City Works Press, 2006)
- Heart in utter confusion: Takes on the erotic poetry of India (1982) with Alan Horseradish (Illustrator)
- Passionate Journey: Poems and Drawings in the Erotic Mood (City Miner Books, 1984) with Arthur Okamura
- Mysteries of the Body: Poems by Steve Kowit (Uroboros Books, 1994)
- Epic Journeys, Unbelievable Distances (1998)
- Cherish: New and Selected Poems (University of Tampa Press, 2015)
