= Hale Appleman =

American actor

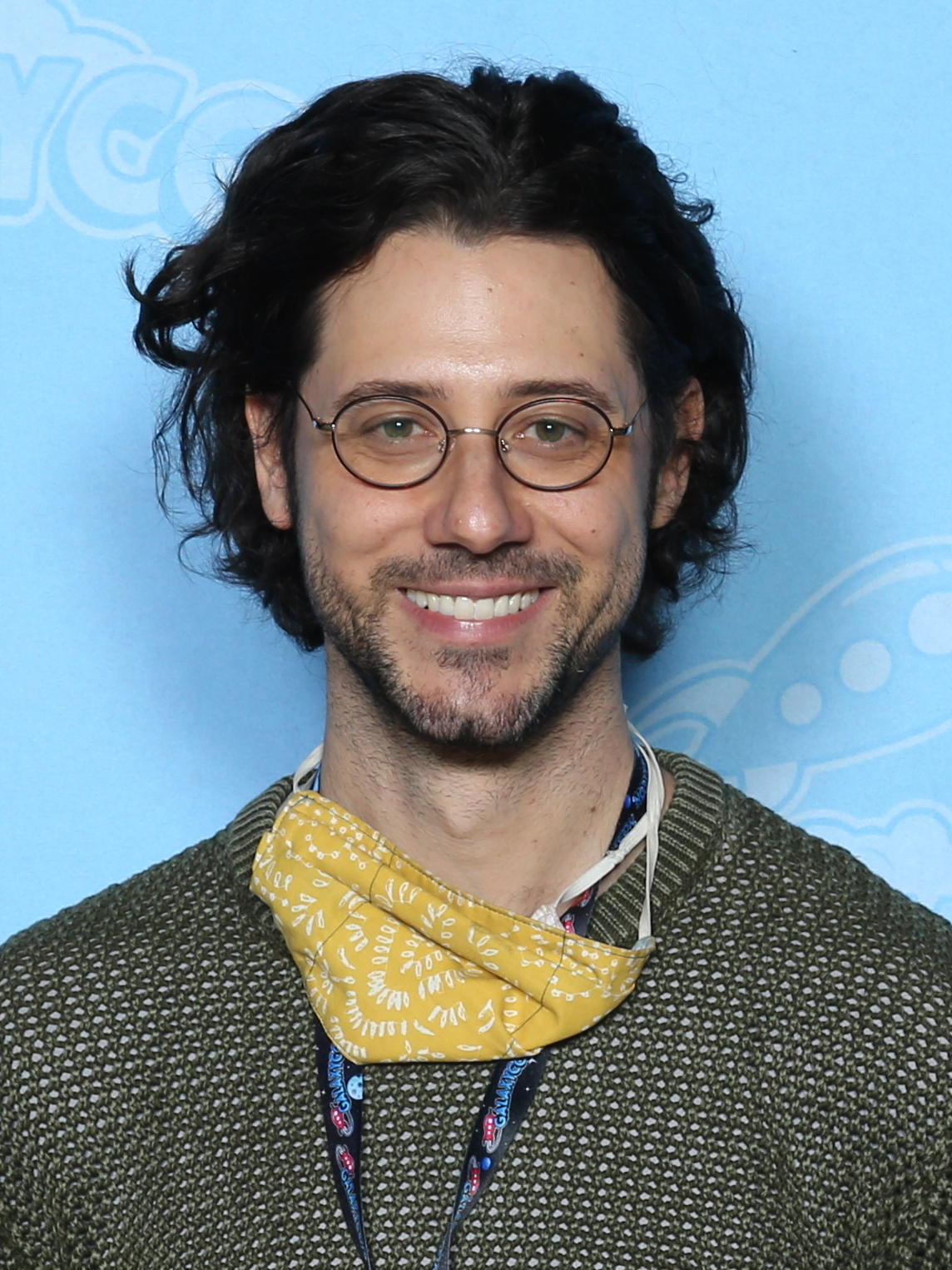
- Appleman in 2022
- Education: Carnegie Mellon University
- Occupation: Actor
- Years active: 2006–present

Hale Isaac Appleman is an American actor. He is known for playing Tobey Cobb in the 2007 film Teeth and Eliot in the television fantasy series The Magicians.

== Early life ==
Appleman was raised in Manhattan, New York. He spent four summers at the performing arts summer camp French Woods and attended the Fiorello H. LaGuardia High School. After attending Carnegie Mellon for "a year and a month or two", he dropped out to film a role in a movie.

== Career ==
Appleman's credits on stage include the revival of Streamers at the Roundabout Theater Company, Clifford Odets' Paradise Lost at the American Repertory Theater, and the New York premiere of Sarah Ruhl's Passion Play as Jesus. In 2011, he played Bob in Moonchildren at the Berkshire Theatre Festival, and can be heard on the L.A. Theatre Works recording of Sam Shepard's Buried Child. Appleman was seen at The Old Globe Theater as Mercutio in The Last Goodbye.

Appleman played Zach on the NBC musical drama series Smash. He made his film debut in Beautiful Ohio and portrayed cartoonist Judd Winick in Pedro. His other credits include Josh Neff in Private Romeo, the short film Oysters Rockefeller, and The Magicians, a TV series based on the novel of the same name by Lev Grossman, in which he played the magician Eliot from 2015 to 2020.

In 2025 and 2026, he performed in the play Birthright by Jonathan Spector.

== Personal life ==
Appleman has said that he is "definitely not straight" and described himself as queer.

== Filmography ==
=== Film ===
Year	Title	Role	Notes
2006	Beautiful Ohio	Elliot	
2007	Teeth	Tobey	
2008	Pedro	Judd	
2011	Private Romeo	Josh Neff	
2015	White Orchid	Handsome	
2025	Fireflies in the Dusk	Cecil	Short film

=== Television ===
Year	Title	Role	Notes
2012	Smash	Zach	2 episodes
2015–2020	The Magicians	Eliot Waugh	Main role
2021	Truth Be Told	Lachlan	4 episodes
2022	American Horror Story: NYC	Daniel Kanowicz	5 episodes
