= Roqy Tyraid =

American rapper and activist (born 1986)

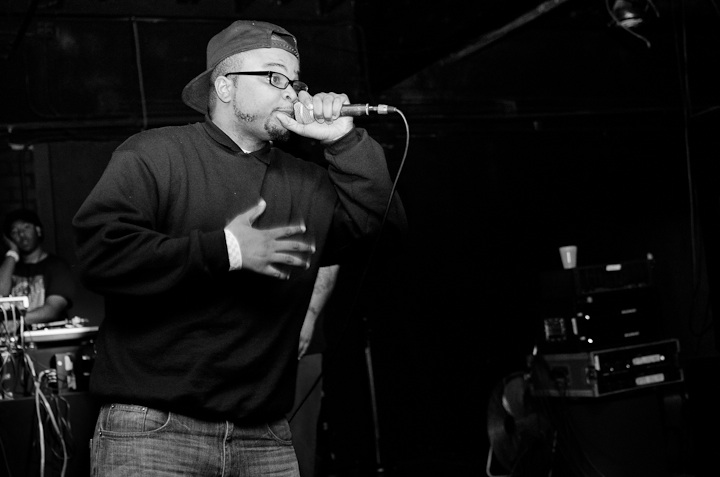
- Roqy Tyraid Performing at the Key Club in Los Angeles, 2012
- Born: Jacob Raiford; May 19, 1986 (age 40); San Diego, California, U.S.
- Other name: RoQy TyRaiD
- Occupations: Rapper, activist
- Years active: 2004–present
- Known for: The Dichotomy of RoQy TyRaiD

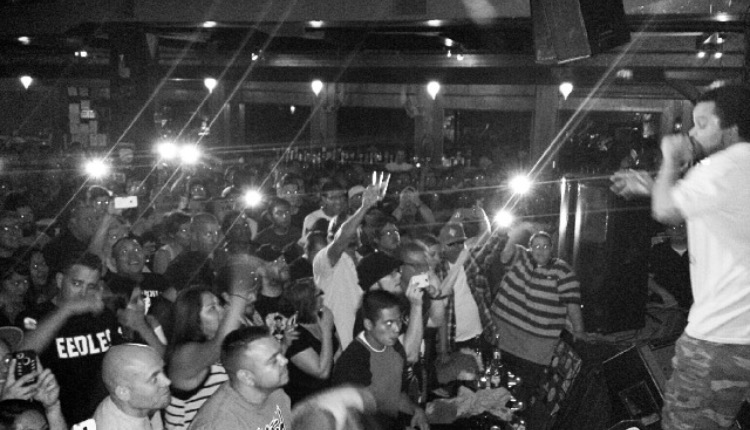
Roqy Tyraid performing in Phoenix, Arizona, 2015

Jacob Raiford (born May 19, 1986), known professionally as Roqy TyRaiD, is an American rapper and activist. In 2015, he signed with Soulspazm Records and released his debut studio album, The Dichotomy of RoQy TyRaiD, in 2016. The album produced three singles that charted on independent college radio charts.

== Personal life ==
Raiford was born and raised in San Diego, California, and later moved to Phoenix, Arizona, where he resides He is the third of five children.

He has cited his mother and his fiancée as influences who helped spark his interest in hip hop. His oldest brother introduced him to various genres of music during his childhood. Raiford is a former member of the Universal Zulu Nation’s Southwest chapter and has been interviewed by local news outlets for leading Black Lives Matter marches in Tempe, Arizona.

== Music career ==
=== 2004 – 2008: Beginning ===
At the age of 19, Raiford attended school in Phoenix, Arizona, performing under the alias J RoQ. He traveled to Pomona, California, where his musical collective relocated and formed TAK-OVR Entertainment, led by DJ Metric. The collective included the hip-hop group 60 East, with Space Ghost as its flagship artist. Both Raiford and McAdams were active in the Inland Empire music scene, where McAdams was the first artist promoted by the label, followed by Raiford. They collaborated on McAdams' project, House on Haunted Hill.

Raiford partnered with Grammy-nominated producer Dion Brigham, a.k.a. Checkin Trapps. Raiford then launched a marketing campaign, selling his first two mixtapes: Prequel 2 Bootlegs and Hiatus RoQ. He claimed to have sold around 20,000 copies between the winter of 2006 and mid-2008.

At local shows, Raiford would occasionally engage in rap battles with members of the crowd, advertising this on Myspace as "Going on a Tirade." In late 2008, out of respect for J Rocc, Raiford decided to retire the moniker J RoQ. He spoke with childhood friend Chino XL, who suggested "Tirade," and Raiford agreed, and conceptualised Roqy Tyraid as a combination between "Roq" and "Tirade."

=== 2009 – 2010: RoQy TyRaiD - The New Millennium Man ===
Raiford befriended Rampage, a Flipmode Squad member and the cousin of Busta Rhymes, who recruited Raiford onto his label, Deep Freeze. Raiford then left to manage his career, releasing singles to local DJs, engaging in record battles, and appearing on the radio. In late 2010, he released his first mixtape as Roqy Tyraid, The New Millennium Man, consisting of original songs and mixtape records containing instrumentals. His first single, "Woosah," sampled the Pointer Sisters' Pinball Number Count and repurposed a popular Sesame Street song. The video, an homage to Sesame Street, garnered positive reception from online publications such as AllHipHop, who featured the song in their "Heaters of the Day" series.

=== 2011 – 2014: Singles and The Wake Up Show ===
After promoting The New Millennium Man, Phoenix DJ and on-air personality Ramses Ja, brother of Rakaa Iriscience, approached Raiford to do a weekly segment for his show with Bootleg Kev called Ready Set Radio, which aired out of Phoenix and Las Vegas.

For the next nine months, Raiford detailed events such as the 2011 Egyptian revolution, the Libyan civil war, and the 2011 Tōhoku earthquake and tsunami. DJ John Blaze from Phoenix assisted with the recording and editing. Following this, Raiford returned to releasing singles and visuals, including "Break Shit" and "Bye Felicia," and began touring. Raiford joined Skyyhook Radio, which featured acts such as Headkrack & The Bodega Brovas, A Tribe Called Quest's Jarobi White, and Combat Jack.

In the winter of 2013, after being in rotation on Shade 45 and The Wake Up Show, he participated in a live cipher called The Wake Up Show: Unplugged. The show was hosted by Sway & King Tech, with live mixing from D.J. Revolution. The live band included Anderson .Paak, Bobby & IZ Avila, Andre Desantana, and Tru James.

In 2014, Raiford shifted his attention towards his official album, The Dichotomy of RoQy TyRaiD. At this time, he joined The Clean Up Crew, hosted by Nick Norris on KWSS 93.9 in Phoenix, Arizona. The station achieved a #1 rating by 2016. Raiford was mentioned in "Best Of" lists for independent/underground hip-hop acts on sites such as AllHipHop.

=== 2015 – 2016: The Dichotomy of RoQy TyRaiD and global touring ===
At the beginning of 2015, Raiford worked to complete his album The Dichotomy of RoQy TyRaiD and set up a Kickstarter to fund the project. The album was recorded at HKS Studios in Phoenix, Arizona, and mastered by DJ Pickster One. Raiford changed the album's track listing five times before completion in the summer of 2015.

During this time, he was introduced to Jim Drew, head of Soulspazm Records, via Raiford's DJ Terrance "SlopfunkDust" Harding. Drew expressed interest in working with Raiford, and a contract to release the album was drawn up. Raiford concluded his tenure at Skyyhook Radio, and announced the signing via social media shortly after his performance at the A3C Festival in Atlanta, Georgia.

In December 2015, The Dichotomy of RoQy TyRaiD was released simultaneously with the lead single "Hey You." Both "Hey You", and the Slopfunkdust-produced "Over The Horizon" performed well in the indie college charts, with "Hey You" landing at Number One. Other records include the Oddisee-produced Barefoot Running and Application, Dedication, Discipline, produced by Arza1990. The song "The RaiD" was described by Raiford as intended to be part of a series, he intended to explore through future 2018 releases.

In early 2016, he and Slopfunkdust went on The Dichotomy Tour through the UK and Europe. Following his European tour, he toured North America.

On October 31, 2016, the visual "Kenny Powers" was released, which featured a fictional hunt of a Donald Trump supporter, based on The Purge.

=== 2017: Redirection ===
Raiford released "Crown Me," which returned to the indie college charts, peaking at #2. Raiford worked with Phoenix Sun's visual arts director Derrick Reed, paying homage to cult hits such as Black Dynamite, The Warriors, Akira, and Game of Death. The Clean Up Crew joined Radio Supa and was picked up by iHeart Radio.

Raiford also debuted an online-only release titled A LP Has No Name, featuring unreleased Dichotomy records.

=== 2018 – Present ===
In the previous year, Raiford announced he was working on a follow-up to The Dichotomy of RoQy TyRaiD. In 2019, this was officially released as a five-track mixtape, Outbreak, which became the basis of his work for the next several years.

== Musical style ==
=== Rapping technique ===
Raiford does not write lyrics down, stating that memorization provides a stronger connection to the craft and allows the lyrics and energy of the performance to be unique, as opposed to static cadences and vocal tones. In songs such as "The RaiD," he can be heard changing his accent to emphasize the dialogue. In "Kenny Powers," he warps his vocals to take on a bullhorn effect. He has cited Black Thought, Royce Da 5'9, and Busta Rhymes as examples of artists who adapt to songs without compromise.
