= Fireflies in the Dusk =

2025 film by Jonathan Hammond

- Poster
- Directed by: Jonathan Hammond
- Written by: Jonathan Hammond; Ryan Roach
- Produced by: Martin Spanjers
- Starring: Derrick Acosta; Hale Appleman; Nick Ballard; Austin Basis; Jade Catta-Preta; Drew Droege; Emily Goss; Suzy Nakamura; Ryan Roach; Amy Yasbeck
- Cinematography: Elle Schneider
- Edited by: Anjoum Agrama
- Music by: Nick Byron Campbell
- Production company: GrooveKo
- Release date: March 27, 2025 (Cleveland International Film Festival)
- Running time: 18 minutes
- Country: United States
- Language: English

Fireflies in the Dusk is a 2025 American romantic comedy short film directed by Jonathan Hammond and written by Hammond and Ryan Roach. The films stars Emily Goss, Nick Ballard, Hale Appleman, Drew Droege, and Amy Yasbeck.

== Premise ==
A Victorian maiden slips through a wormhole and falls in love with a modern man.

== Cast ==
- Derrick Acosta as Fernando
- Hale Appleman as Cecil
- Nick Ballard as Zachary
- Austin Basis as Rockwell
- Jade Catta-Preta as Brianna
- Drew Droege as Martin
- Emily Goss as Charlotte
- Suzy Nakamura as Dr. Abbott
- Ryan Roach as Ricky
- Amy Yasbeck as Edith

== Production ==
Hammond said the story was inspired by the 1985 film A Room With a View and that he wanted to make something for "people who have seen it all and want something a little different."

== Release ==
The film premiered on March 27, 2025, at Cleveland International Film Festival.

== Reception ==
Alan Ng of Film Threat scored it 7.5 out of 10 and said "It's as if Jane Austen dropped acid and binged Rick and Morty." Peter Gray of The AU Review scored the film 4 out of 5, calling it a "melodramatic romp of a comedy." Journalist Ramon Writes said it was "uniquely entertaining," comparing the film to The Lake House, You've Got Mail, The Office, and Bridgerton with the comedy of Mel Brooks. Rachel Sinclair of Film Business said the film "is a vibrant, unpredictable romp that makes you laugh." Barbara Keer of Splash Magazines praised the costumes and performances. Mark Lakatos of Take 2 Indie Review scored it 4 out of 5 and stated it "bends its genres effortlessly into a surprisingly hilarious, possibly divisive but no less poignant dramedy that has much to say about the changing times."
