= OnStage Playhouse =

Non-profit community theater in Chula Vista, California

OnStage Playhouse is a non-profit community theatre located at 291 3rd Ave. in Chula Vista, California.

OnStage Playhouse has acted as the only live theatre serving the South Bay section of San Diego County, covering the cities of Chula Vista, National City, Imperial Beach and San Ysidro. Each Season, ranging from July to June, the playhouse stages 6 plays or musicals in their 60-seat theatre. All aspects of these productions are done by an all-volunteer cast and crew.

OnStage Playhouse is a member of American Association of Community Theatre, San Diego Association of Community Theatres, and the San Diego Performing Arts League.

== History ==
OnStage Playhouse was founded in 1983, though at a different location.

During the COVID-19 pandemic in California, the theatre livestreamed its performances.

In March 2023, the theatre was honored with its second Craig Noel Award for Outstanding Achievement By a Small Theater for its work in the 2022 season.

== Notable productions ==
Year	Title	Notes
1995	Guilty Conscience	
2004	Hay Fever	
2005	Book of Days	
2011	Pride and Prejudice	
2011	The Diary of Anne Frank	
2018	Xanadu	Choreographed by Patrick Mayuyu
2022	The Other Place	
2024	Gloria	
2025	The Effect	

== Notable actors ==
- Michael C. Burgess
- Thom Michael Mulligan
- Jennifer Paredes
- Kimberly Weinberger
- Nick Young
