= Shep Meyers =

American jazz musician

- Born: Shepard Meyers; October 5, 1936; Passaic, New Jersey, U.S.
- Origin: Fair Lawn, New Jersey, U.S.
- Died: July 18, 2009 (aged 72) San Diego, California, U.S.
- Genres: Jazz
- Occupations: Pianist, composer, arranger, conductor
- Instrument: Piano
- Years active: 1960s–2009

Shep Meyers (October 5, 1936 – July 18, 2009) was an American pianist, composer, arranger, and conductor. He was born in Passaic, New Jersey, and raised in Fair Lawn. who lived in San Diego, California from 1977. He recorded with Ella Fitzgerald and many others. He accompanied singer Julie London for seven nights a week as well as jazz vocalists Anita O'Day, Billy Daniels, Peggy Lee, and Eleonor England. He served as conductor for the bands of comedians Lenny Bruce, Steve Allen, Redd Foxx, Henny Youngman, and Johnny Carson during his residency at the Sahara Hotel in Las Vegas. He has played with Woody Herman, Coleman Hawkins, Art Pepper, Conte Candoli, and Don Joham. He died of a stroke on July 18, 2009.

His career started when he moved to New York and studied in the Manhattan School of Music. He was arranger and conductor for over 500 radio and television commercials and arranger for the Radio City Music Hall Symphony Orchestra. In the eleven years he spent composing, arranging and conducting television commercials, those commercial were nominated for seven Clio Awards. He also produced, edited, and created the music video for the Grammy award winning album Digital Duke by Mercer Ellington.

From 1986 to 2009, he played regularly at Croce's restaurant and bar, run by Ingrid Croce. During this time, he also played at the Hotel del Coronado, L'Auberge, and the Loews Coronado.

Meyers recorded three albums as a leader, one of them a solo: Cornerstones featuring the Shep Meyers Quartet and saxophonist Jay Migliori, Originals (2007) and Solo Thoughts (2007). The 23rd August 2009 a memorial concert was held at Croce's Restaurant and Bar, where Daniel Jackson, Mike Wofford, Bob Magnusson and Dave Curtis.

== Discography ==
- Cornerstones (2001)
- Solo Thoughts (2007)
- Originals (2007)
