= We All Die Alone =

2021 American film by Jonathan Hammond

- Directed by: Jonathan Hammond
- Written by: Jonathan Hammond; Ryan Roach
- Produced by: Ryan Binse; Jonathan Hammond; Carla Nell; Yasmin Preciado; Shannon Taylor
- Starring: Brian Patrick Butler; Frank DiPalermo; Joshua Alan Jones; Patrick Mayuyu; Durwood Murray; Carla Nell; Suzana Norberg; Brent Roberts; Alexandra Slade
- Cinematography: Ellie Ann Fenton
- Edited by: Tyler J. French
- Music by: Nick Byron Campbell
- Production companies: GrooveKo; Jonathan Hammond Productions
- Distributed by: Omeleto
- Release dates: September 12, 2021 (FilmOut San Diego); November 22, 2022 (Omeleto); April 2, 2023 (Film Shortage)
- Running time: 14 minutes
- Country: United States
- Language: English

We All Die Alone is a 2021 American dark comedy short film directed by Jonathan Hammond and written by Hammond and Ryan Roach. It stars Brian Patrick Butler, Frank DiPalermo, Patrick Mayuyu and Alexandra Slade.

The film premiered in 2021 at FilmOut San Diego in San Diego, California. It has screened at festivals such as Sidewalk Film Festival, Sarasota Film Festival, San Diego International Film Festival, HollyShorts Film Festival and won awards at Burbank International Film Festival, Downtown Los Angeles Film Festival, Phoenix Film Festival, GI Film Festival, Oceanside International Film Festival and Idyllwild International Festival of Cinema.

The film was distributed by Omeleto and Film Shortage on their YouTube channels.

== Plot ==
The arrogance of a conflict negotiator results in two clashing gangs butting heads in a stand-off that leads to dramatic conversations about Mexican food, romance and tragic consequences.

== Cast ==
- Brian Patrick Butler as Riley
- Frank DiPalermo as Peter
- Joshua Alan Jones as Killer
- Patrick Mayuyu as Phillip
- Durwood Murray as Second Story
- Carla Nell as Patsy
- Suzana Norberg as Svetlana
- Brent Roberts as Crusher
- Alexandra Slade as Evangelique

== Production ==
Principal photography took place in San Diego. Jonathan Hammond and Ryan Binse are a few filmmakers involved in the project. Hammond said he was inspired by Quentin Tarantino, Brian De Palma, Martin Scorsese and Edgar Wright. The film was originally made as a 48 hour film and was recreated after three years with additional characters. Ryan Roach co-wrote the script.

== Release ==
We All Die Alone premiered on September 12, 2021, at FilmOut San Diego in San Diego, California. It screened on October 15 of the same year at San Diego International Film Festival.

In 2022, it screened at Sidewalk Film Festival, Dances With Films, HollyShorts Film Festival, Sarasota Film Festival, GI Film Festival San Diego and Reeling: The Chicago LGBTQ+ International Film Festival.

The film was distributed on YouTube by Omeleto on November 22, 2022, and Film Shortage on April 2, 2023.

== Reception ==
=== Critical response ===
Alan Ng of Film Threat wrote the film is "exactly what I look for in comedy" and "bends the gangster genre enough to make the story feel fresh."

=== Accolades ===
List of awards and nominations
Festival	Year	Award	Recipient(s)	Result	Ref.
Reeling: The Chicago LGBTQ+ International Film Festival	2022	Best Narrative Short – Audience Choice Award	We All Die Alone	Won	
Burbank International Film Festival	2022	Best LGBTQ Short Film	We All Die Alone	Won	
Downtown Los Angeles Film Festival	2022	Best Ensemble Cast	We All Die Alone	Won	
Idyllwild International Festival of Cinema	2022	Juan Anchia Award for Best Cinematography for a Short Film	Ellie Ann Fenton	Won	
Idyllwild International Festival of Cinema	2022	Indie Spirit Award	We All Die Alone	Won	
Idyllwild International Festival of Cinema	2022	Best Short Film	We All Die Alone	Nominated	
Idyllwild International Festival of Cinema	2022	Best Director - Short Film	Jonathan Hammond	Nominated	
Idyllwild International Festival of Cinema	2022	Best Actor - Short Film	Patrick Mayuyu	Nominated	
Idyllwild International Festival of Cinema	2022	Best Screenplay - Short Film	Jonathan Hammond, Ryan Roach	Nominated	
Idyllwild International Festival of Cinema	2022	Excellence in Producing	Yasmin Preciado, Shannon Taylor	Nominated	
Idyllwild International Festival of Cinema	2022	Best Original Score - Short	Nick Byron Campbell	Nominated	
Oceanside International Film Festival	2022	Best Supporting Actress	Suzana Norberg	Won	
Oceanside International Film Festival	2022	Best Supporting Actress	Carla Nell	Nominated	
Oceanside International Film Festival	2022	Best Supporting Actor	Brian Patrick Butler	Nominated	
Oceanside International Film Festival	2022	Best Supporting Actor	Brent Roberts	Nominated	
Oceanside International Film Festival	2022	Best Art Direction	We All Die Alone	Nominated	
Oceanside International Film Festival	2022	Best Cinematography in a Short	Ellie Ann Fenton	Nominated	
Oceanside International Film Festival	2022	Best Narrative Short Film	We All Die Alone	Nominated	
GI Film Festival San Diego	2022	Local Choice Award	Jonathan Hammond	Won	
GI Film Festival San Diego	2022	Best Local Narrative Short	Jonathan Hammond	Nominated	
Phoenix Film Festival	2022	Copper Wing Award for Best LGBTQIA+ Directed Short	Jonathan Hammond	Won	
