= Melancholy Play =

Play written by Sarah Ruhl

- Samuel French Cover Art
- Original language: English
- Written by: Sarah Ruhl
- Characters: Tilly; Frank; Frances; Joan; Lorenzo the Unfeeling; Musician
- Genre: Comedy/Drama
- Setting: Illinois

Premiere
- Date: June 28, 2002
- Place: Piven Theatre; Evanston, IL

Melancholy Play: A Contemporary Farce is a play by Sarah Ruhl that premiered in 2002 at the Piven Theatre in Evanston, Illinois. It follows the sometimes melodramatic bank teller, Tilly, and her emotion-driven adventure with several other characters.

== Plot ==
=== Part One ===
Frank, a tailor, addresses the audience and gives a defense of melancholy. Tilly, a bank teller, then walks up to Frank and asks him why he is like an almond, and both exit with the question unresolved. In the next scene, Lorenzo, a foreign psychologist, gives a monologue to the audience regarding his lack of emotion. Tilly then enters his office and they talk about her medication. During the session, Lorenzo gradually reveals that he is in love with Tilly, for which Tilly apologizes. Frances, a hairdresser, gives a simultaneous monologue with Frank about giving up their previous jobs and following their dreams. Tilly then visits Frank's tailor shop and has her pants hemmed. While there, she again asks him why he is like an almond, which she explains to him and then confesses that she sees him as a customer at the bank often. Their conversation about the bank continues but soon turns into one about emotions. They soon get passionate and end up kissing. Soon after, Lorenzo asks Tilly about her encounter with Frank, though he steers the subject towards himself and his love for Tilly. She leaves to get her haircut, leaving Lorenzo bereft. As Frances cuts Tilly's hair, they have a mundane conversation that once again turns into one about feelings, sadness, and their inner lives. There is a brief moment of strong connection when Tilly puts her hand on Frances's cheek, but they go their separate ways. Meanwhile, Lorenzo lists off causes of "Love Melancholy" to himself. At their apartment, Frances tells her girlfriend, Joan, a British nurse, about her encounter with Tilly. Joan tells Frances she is not jealous and they agree to have Tilly over for tea. Then, Frank and Tilly talk about making love and their emotional outpour afterward. In the following scene, Tilly has tea with Joan and Frances at their apartment. They discuss trivial matters until Tilly begins speaking about love and her melancholy, but pauses when she questions the strange manner of her speech. Feeling unwell from the melancholy, Tilly lies down on the couch while the other women stroke her hair. While Joan is away putting a record on, Frances mounts Tilly, but unmounts her when Joan comes back. Tilly then leaves. Joan and Frances talk about their shared attraction to Tilly, then Frances realizes she has lost her sense of smell. On Tilly's birthday, Frank gives her flowers and Tilly feels happy. She sings a song as every other character enters. Soon, everyone joins in the song. Later, at her party, everyone shows up but Frank, who has a stomach ache. The group plays duck, duck, goose, and when Tilly's turn comes up, she becomes extremely happy, overwhelmed by everyone's beauty. She leaves to lie down ecstatically.

=== Part Two ===
After her birthday party, Tilly meets up with Frank and tells him about her happiness. Frank is not in the mood for this kind of announcement, and Tilly feels she needs to be alone with her happiness. Later, she tells Lorenzo of her happiness, which upsets him because it means an end to their sessions. In a soliloquy, Frank continues defending melancholy, listing the causes, including "Tilly—a main cause." Tilly stops by Joan and Frances's place in the middle of a bike ride to tell them she is happy. Feeling unwell because of this, Frances and Joan decide to take the day off from work, but then Joan realizes that sick people need her care. The two argue over her going to work until Joan finally leaves. Frank appears elsewhere onstage and he and Frances relate their melancholy to the audience together. In Lorenzo's office, Frank tells the story of how he and Tilly met and fell in love. He shows Lorenzo a vial of tears he collected from Tilly's melancholic stage. Lorenzo laughs out of empathy and recommends Frank take medication or have a stay in the hospital. Frank refuses and continues his story, surprising Lorenzo when he reveals the woman he is speaking of is Tilly. Lorenzo demands the vial of tears and they fight over it until Joan enters. Before Lorenzo can get it, Frank hands Joan the vial for safekeeping. When Frances learns of the contents of the vial after Joan brings it home, she takes it and drinks the tears. Joan, Frances, Frank, and Lorenzo then sing a song and lament about Tilly's newly found happiness. Tilly walks across the stage and then Frances exits. At a café, Joan confides in Tilly the fact that Frances has turned into an almond. Back at their apartment, Joan shows Tilly the almond she believes is Frances. They try to console Frances and deliberate over what to do with her when a letter is shoved under the door. The letter warns people suffering of melancholy to stay in their homes and beware of becoming almonds. Meanwhile, Frances is enjoying her time in the almond, and Lorenzo walks down the street wondering about the multitudinous almonds there while stepping on them. At work, Joan wonders how to cure Frances of her melancholy, realizing that all the remedies she can think of are also causes of melancholy. Tilly visits Frank at his tailor shop and tells him what happened to Frances. Frank then reveals that he and Frances are long-lost twins shipped separately to America in packages from Scandinavia. They resolve to get Frances back and embrace. As Tilly cries, Frank concludes that her tears must be collected. Joan, Tilly, Frank, and Lorenzo gather around Frances the Almond. After an inspirational speech from Tilly, they all drink Tilly's tears. The lights fade out and Frances is in the middle of their circle when the lights come back up. All of the characters happily reunite with Frances. They all wonder if they are almonds and look in a mirror to check. Also, for the first time, they notice the cello player on stage. They all dance around and are happy together as the play ends.

== Themes ==
In the introduction to Melancholy Play in her play anthology, The Clean House and Other Plays, Sarah Ruhl references A. Jaruwat, M.D., who wrote about the amygdala, "the most important organ of emotion in the brain." It is named after the Greek word for "almond," hence the almond's significance to emotion in the play. She also provides a picture of a "mandorla," a symbol that derives its name from the Italian word for almond, as it contains an almond shape.

Emotions account for all of the story development in the play, as Tilly uses her melancholy and other emotions to influence the other characters. Love is also a prominent theme in the play, as it can lead to melancholy or happiness. The characters all seem to be searching for love and try to find it wherever and whenever they can to escape the mundanity of their lives. Love changes their emotions and can lead to happiness or strife.

== Chamber musical ==
The play has been re-worked to be a chamber musical, with music by composer Todd Almond, featuring a string quartet and pianist to complement the play. This version was presented at the Piven Theatre Workshop in May 2015 to June 21, directed by Polly Noonan (the original Tilly).

The chamber music version was originally produced by 13P in New York City in July 2012.

Almond recalls:

"Sarah wanted me to look at an early play of hers called Melancholy Play, a play that had a musical element already but that she felt wanted more exploration...I didn’t want to write songs (music and lyrics), I wanted to simply set the entire play to music. Many lyricists, including myself, toil endlessly to say in lyrics what Sarah says so naturally in dialogue....And suddenly it was written. The whole thing. Her beautiful, strange play was now a sung-through — well, nearly sung-through — musical..."

Ruhl, in a feature article for The New York Times, wrote that critics were not invited to review the chamber version of the play in 2012. There were 11 performances with no previews. "It didn't feel fair to me to burden the production team with the pressure of reviews when we were already embarking on something so insanely ambitious, given our resources....At times as a writer one has the impulse to exist outside that cycle [relationship with the press] and burrow; to burrow in the dark, or in Brooklyn, and make something quiet and simple, and offer it without any fanfare to the audience."

The reviewer of the 2015 production for the Windy City Times wrote: "...this is truly whimsical stuff. But with Almond's added musical score and the dedicated and enthusiastic performances of the cast, this doesn't feel as cloying as it could be. Scored for a string quartet with Aaron Benham as the pianist/music director, Almond's score flows in and out like recitative and fits in with the chamber nature of the intimate venue. In fact, the music makes the quirkiness and daffiness of the characters and the fantastical situations feel far more acceptable by heightening the unreal nature of it all."

== Production history ==
Melancholy Play premiered at the Piven Theatre, Evanston, Illinois, running from June 28, 2002, to August 4, 2002. Directed by Jessica Thebus, the cast featured Polly Noonan as Tilly.

It was later produced in October 2002 at Princeton University; in May 2005 by The Echo Theater Company in Los Angeles; in June 2011 by the Ensemble Theatre of Cincinnati; and in January 2012 by Upstart Productions in Dallas, Texas.

The play was presented by 13P in Brooklyn, New York in July 2012.

International

It was produced in Singapore by Couch Theatre in July 2013.
