= Downtown Los Angeles Film Festival =

Film festival established in 2008

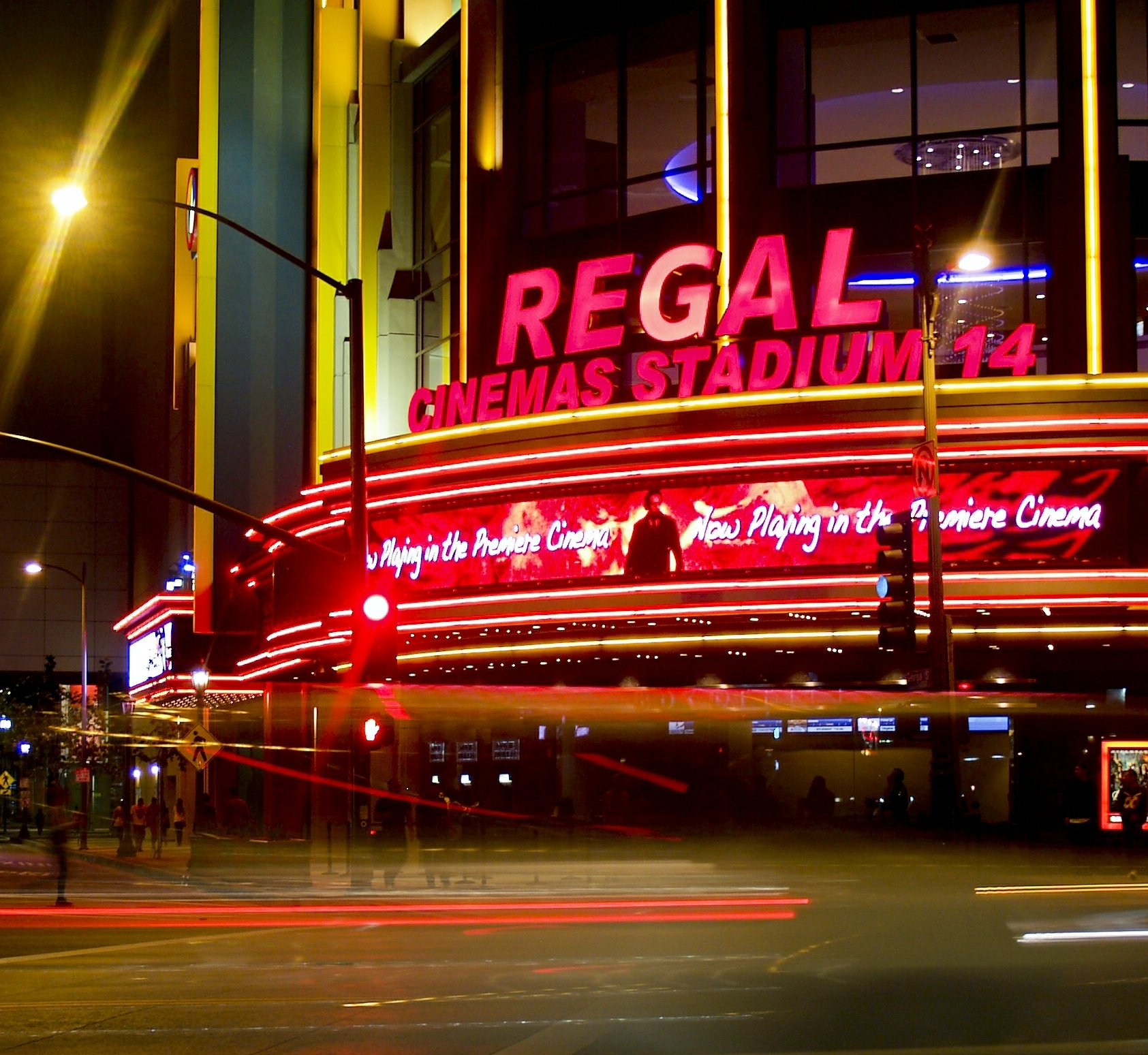
- DTLAFF venue Regal Cinemas L.A. Live in 2012
- Location: Downtown Los Angeles, California, U.S.
- Established: 2008
- Most recent: 2023
- Website: https://dtlaff.com/

The Downtown Los Angeles Film Festival (DTLAFF) is an annual film festival based in Downtown Los Angeles.

== History ==
The festival was founded in 2008 and the venue used is the Regal Cinemas at L.A. Live. The Grammy Museum helped sponsor the festival in 2009. As of 2018, the festival is the largest film and television event in the downtown area. Some of the feature films that screened that year previously debuted at Tribeca Festival, South by Southwest and Sundance Film Festival. The festival was previously known as Downtown Film Festival Los Angeles (DFFLA).

Since 2019, Greg Ptaceck has managed the festival which showcased over 100 films that year, most of which were directed by women. Recipients of the Independent Film Pioneer Award include Laura Dern, Kathy Griffin, John Hawkes, William H. Macy, Virginia Madsen, John C. Reilly, Julie Delpy and Mark Ruffalo.

=== Notable films ===
- A Hell of a Story
- All Creatures Here Below
- The Crimson Kimono
- The Diary of Preston Plummer
- Faubourg Treme: The Untold Story of Black New Orleans
- The Immaculate Conception of Little Dizzle
- Jake Squared
- Lost Transmissions
- Mondo Hollywoodland
- Night of the Living Dead
- Pauly Shore Stands Alone
- Piccadilly
- Punk in Africa
- QT8: The First Eight
- Raising Bertie
- Reach for Me
- Restraint
- Strength and Honour
- Surviving Sex Trafficking
- Traitor
- We All Die Alone
