= Cygnet Theatre Company =

Cygnet Theatre Company is a performing arts theatre company in San Diego, California. It was founded in 2003 by Bill Schmidt and Sean Murray. The theatre's name is a reference to the Swan Theatre, a prominent competitor to Shakespeare's Globe. One of San Diego's major theatre companies is the Old Globe Theatre.

== History ==
Cygnet's first season included Hedwig and the Angry Inch, Bed and Sofa, and Fully Committed. Highlights in the first eight seasons include Cat on a Hot Tin Roof, The Little Foxes, The Invention of Love, Yellowman, Copenhagen, Fences, A Little Night Music, The History Boys, Noises Off, Sweeney Todd, The Norman Conquests, Cabaret, and the World Premiere of Stephen Metcalfe's Tragedy of the Commons.

Since its founding in 2003, Cygnet Theatre has presented at the Old Town Theatre in Old Town San Diego State Historic Park. On November 16, 2022, NTC Foundation and Cygnet Theatre announced a partnership to create the Joan and Irwin Jacobs Performing Arts Center in Building 178 at Liberty Station. The project was completed in 2025, and the venue officially opened on September 5, 2025. The arts center will serve as Cygnet’s future home and a performance space for dance and other performing arts companies.

Its programs include:

- Mainstage. Cygnet presents six mainstage productions each season in the 248-seat Old Town Theatre. Cygnet has made its mark by producing top-quality theatre, including 19 city, regional, Southern CA, West Coast and World premieres in its first eight seasons, while garnering over 90 awards for theatre excellence.
- Storytelling on the Green, Cygnet’s educational outreach program presents outdoor daytime historical theatre to school groups, tourists and other Old Town State Park visitors. At various times of year, the repertory includes abridged versions of Hamlet, Macbeth, A Christmas Carol, The Legend of Sleepy Hollow and A Midsummer Night’s Dream. The actors arrive at the Old Town lawn pulling a simple wagon platform, which carries the props, scenery and costumes, and also serves as the stage. In keeping with the American Period theme (1840-1872) of Old Town San Diego State Historic Park, the actors perform in the Delsarte style. The program serves over 9,000 children and adults each year.
- Playwrights in Process is a New Play Development program, designed to explore and develop new works. Cygnet’s mainstage production of Stephen Metcalfe’s Tragedy of the Commons was the first play to come through this program.
- Cygnet Theatre collaborates with San Diego State University to provide opportunities each year for specially selected SDSU graduate students to design sets, lights and costumes for Cygnet Theatre under the mentorship of Artistic Director Sean Murray.

== Awards and recognition ==
Cygnet was awarded the American Theatre Wing's National Theatre Company Grant in 2016.
