= New Village Arts =

Theater company in Carlsbad, California

- Abbreviation: NVA
- Formation: 2001
- Founders: Kristianne Kurner; Francis Gercke
- Type: Theater company
- Headquarters: Dea Hurston New Village Arts Center
- Location: Carlsbad, California, U.S.
- Executive artistic director: Kristianne Kurner

New Village Arts (NVA) is an American theater company based in Carlsbad, California. It was founded in 2001 by actors Kristianne Kurner and Francis Gercke. The venue was redeveloped in the early 2020s as the Dea Hurston New Village Arts Center.

== History ==
=== Founding and early years ===
New Village Arts was founded in 2001 by married actors Francis "Fran" Gercke and Kristianne Kurner. They trained at the Actors Studio Drama School in New York before relocating to San Diego County.

Cindy Lou Johnson's two-character play Brilliant Traces was the company's first production in 2001 at a barn in Magee Park. The company presented nonmusical American and Shakespearean classics and works by American playwrights. In 2007, NVA found a permanent home in the former Bauer Lumber Company building near the Carlsbad Village train station, converting it into a 99-seat theater. Prior to that, the company managed from the headquarters of Jazzercise near McClellan–Palomar Airport. Gercke later left the organization and Kurner became its executive artistic director.

=== Tenth anniversary and Ensemble Project ===
In 2011, the organization reported an annual budget of around $600,000 and also operated a group of art studios adjacent to its theater called the Foundry. The company established the Ensemble Project, allowing the same resident ensemble of actors and designers to work on productions for an entire season.

=== Dea Hurston New Village Arts Center ===
In 2021, the City of Carlsbad renewed New Village Arts' lease for ten years, with two optional five-year extensions. NVA started redeveloping its Carlsbad facility with a $2.5 million renovation in 2022. Its intention was to transform the theater into a broader community arts center for theater productions, lectures, and workshops.

It was announced that the facility would be renamed the Dea Hurston New Village Arts Center in honor of San Diego playwright and arts advocate Dea Hurston. The new complex included a 100-seat main theater and a 60-seat cabaret. NVA reopened in 2023 and the renovation wound up costing about $2.8 million.
