= San Diego International Fringe Festival =

Fringe festival in San Diego

The San Diego International Fringe Festival is a non-profit fringe theatre festival project of conTACT ARTS, in association with the Actors Alliance of San Diego, designed to help provide a platform for artists while also helping the community as a whole - boosting arts and culture within San Diego.

During the festival, artists from across the United States and around the world participate alongside home-grown talent in art forms including theater, buskers/street performers, cabaret, comedy, circus, dance, film, poetry, spoken word, puppetry, music, visual art, design and other forms.

Key to the operation of San Diego International Fringe Festival is its role to support, encourage, and facilitate producers, artists, presenters, venues, and businesses. The festival works to ensure that artists and all participants involved have the best possible experience.

== Features ==
The San Diego International Fringe Festival provides Fringe-managed venues as well as the opportunity for artists to bring their own venues via BYOV (Bring Your Own Venue). Material presented can include site-specific works that take advantage of city features, as well as works staged in theaters, including San Diego REP's Lyceum Theatres and the historic Spreckels Theatre.

The defining virtues of the festival are that it is open-access and uncensored, it is not juried, and 100% of its ticket income is given to the artists.

== See also ==
- Hollywood Fringe Festival

== References and external links ==
- Official Website
- Canadian Association of Fringe Festival (CAFF) Listing
- United States Association of Fringe Festivals (USAFF) Listing
- KPBS 2015
- San Diego Story 2015
- SD Reader 2015
- Vanguard Culture 2015
- Voice of San Diego 2014
- Citybeat 2013
- Union Tribune 2013
