= Craig Noel =

American theatre producer

- Born: August 25, 1915; Deming, New Mexico, U.S.
- Died: April 3, 2010 (aged 94); San Diego, California, U.S.
- Known for: Theatrical producer and director of San Diego's Old Globe Theatre for more than 60 years

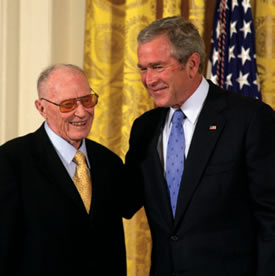
The 2007 National Medal of Arts was awarded to theater director Craig Noel and presented by U.S. President George W. Bush on November 15, 2007, in an East Room ceremony.

Craig Noel (August 25, 1915 – April 3, 2010) was an American theatre producer. He was the founding director of the Old Globe Theatre in San Diego, California, and led it for more than 60 years. He "helped transform it from an insular community group into an influential powerhouse among regional theaters."

The Old Globe began as an attraction at Balboa Park's 1935 California Pacific International Exposition with the presentation of 50-minute versions of Shakespeare plays. After the exposition was over, the group reorganized as a community theatre. Noel, who had moved with his family to San Diego in 1918 and graduated from San Diego High School, acted in the initial production in 1937 at the age of 22. He soon began directing, and he was named the Globe's general director in 1939. After World War II service and a stint in Hollywood, he returned to The Globe in 1947 as resident director. He never left, personally directing more than 200 productions, producing 270 more, and building the Globe into a theatrical powerhouse which won the Tony Award for best regional theater in 1984. Shows which originated at the Old Globe have gone on to Broadway to win nine Tony Awards and nearly 60 nominations. In 1981 Noel hired Jack O'Brien to replace him as artistic director, but he remained active in the leadership of the Old Globe right up until his death.

He created the San Diego National Shakespeare Festival in 1949, making the Globe the first professional Actors Equity theater on the West Coast. Under his leadership the Globe added a second theatre, the in-the-round Cassius Carter Theatre, in 1968, and a third, the outdoor Festival Stage, in 1978. He led rebuilding efforts after the original Globe and later the Festival Stage were destroyed by arson. He was instrumental in creating the Master of Fine Arts in Acting program at the University of San Diego in 1987. In 1983, he established Teatro Meta, a bilingual playwriting program involving thousands of San Diego young people.

He fostered the careers of numerous actors and directors who later achieved fame, including Jack O'Brien, Marion Ross, David Ogden Stiers, Kelsey Grammer, Kandis Chappell and Jonathan McMurtry.

In 2005 Craig Noel celebrated his 90th birthday coinciding with the 70th anniversary of the Old Globe Theatre. In 2007, he was awarded the National Medal of Arts for his ”decades of leadership as a pillar of the American theater.”

He died April 3, 2010, at the age of 94 at his home in San Diego.

== Craig Noel Awards ==
In the early 2000s, the San Diego Theatre Critics Circle started an annual ceremony, presenting awards to theater performers in the San Diego region. The 2019 event was organized by Julie Sarno, Dea Hurton and Denise Bevers. Some of the donors were Lon and Denise Bevers, the Dr. Seuss Foundation and US Bank.
