= Tony Gorodeckas =

American actor

- Born: Anthony K. Gorodeckas; San Diego, California, U.S.
- Education: Escondido High School
- Occupations: Actor; film producer; real estate agent; marketing director
- Years active: 2002–present
- Known for: Continuance
- Notable credits: Closer; Fletcher and Jenks; Uncle Vanya
- Website: tonygorodeckas.com

Anthony K. Gorodeckas is an American actor, film producer, real estate agent, and marketing director who starred in and produced the film Continuance (2021), produced the film Fletcher and Jenks (2016), and appeared in stage productions of Closer (2002) and A Hatful of Rain (2002).

== Personal life ==
Gorodeckas lived in Escondido, California and played water polo at Escondido High School. He graduated with academic honors in 1988.

== Career ==
In the early 2000s, Gorodeckas was the marketing director at New Village Arts Theatre in Carlsbad, California. In 2002, he co-starred in productions of Closer and Michael V. Gazzo's A Hatful of Rain with Francis Gercke, who also directed.

In 2021, Gorodeckas starred in and produced the film Continuance by filmmaker Tony Olmos.

== Stage credits ==
Year	Title	Role	Location	Notes
2002	A Hatful of Rain	Polo Pope	New Village Arts, Carlsbad, California	By Michael V. Gazzo, directed by and starring Francis Gercke
2002	Closer	Dan	6th @ Penn Theatre, Hillcrest, San Diego	
2003	Uncle Vanya	Yefim	New Village Arts Theatre, Carlsbad, California	
2015	Scenes From Mars One: Now With 68% Less Gravity!	Weightless astronaut	San Diego International Fringe Festival	Outstanding Comedy winner

== Filmography ==
Year	Title	Role	Notes
2002	Outta Time	FBI Agent	
2007	The Returning	Robert Morgan	
2007	The Wrath of CAAA	Studio Executive #1	
2011	Elevator	EMT	
2016	Fletcher and Jenks	Herman Hill	Short film, also producer
2016	South of 8	SAF Assassin #3	
2017	John's Big Day	John	Short film, also producer
2021	Graduation Afternoon	TV Anchor	Short film, also producer
2021	The Case of: Dakota Moore	Brian Moore	
2021	Continuance	Jordan Cassel	also producer
2023	Hemet, or the Landlady Don't Drink Tea	T.V. Reporter	
