= Continuance (film) =

2021 film by Tony Olmos

- Release poster
- Directed by: Tony Olmos
- Written by: Tony Olmos
- Produced by: Tony Gorodeckas; Tony Olmos
- Starring: Tony Gorodeckas; Noor Razooky; Teresa Suarez Grosso; Brian Patrick Butler; Kayla Schaffroth; Kelly Potts; Mark Atkinson
- Edited by: Tony Olmos
- Music by: Tony Olmos
- Production company: Rosewood Five
- Distributed by: BayView Entertainment
- Release dates: December 10, 2021 (Shockfest Film Festival); December 30, 2025 (VOD)
- Country: United States
- Language: English
- Budget: $15,000

Continuance is a 2021 American comedy horror slasher film written and directed by Tony Olmos, who also produced with Tony Gorodeckas. The film stars Gorodeckas, Noor Razooky, Teresa Suarez Grosso, Brian Patrick Butler, and Kayla Schaffroth.

== Premise ==
A serial killer goes on a supply run during an economic collapse, with his wife and housekeeper in tow.

== Cast ==
- Tony Gorodeckas as Jordan Cassel
- Noor Razooky as Lupe (Loopy)
- Teresa Suarez Grosso as Lynn
- Kayla Schaffroth as Rhianna
- Brian Patrick Butler as Loren
- Kelly Potts as Alex
- Vicky Nguyen as Vittoria Huang
- Elizabeth Lawson as Sonia (Bike girl)
- Mark Atkinson as Ronnie the bum
- Tomas Navarro as Chuy
- George Jac as Tico
- Sandy Nissou as China
- Arlena August as Gata
- Savannah Hayworth as Jessica Ortiz
- Lexsy McKowen as Toe cut woman
- Alexander Robinson as Doc Floyd

== Production ==
The film is a follow up to Olmos' debut film South of 8. It was shot in 2018 throughout San Diego and Ramona, and was made with a five person crew for a budget around $15,000. A posthumous release and the final role for actor Tomas Navarro.

== Release ==
The film's festival run was affected by the COVID-19 pandemic and production setbacks delayed its streaming release. Continuance premiered on December 10, 2021 at Shockfest Film Festival. It was released on video on demand on December 30, 2025, distributed by BayView Entertainment.

== Reception ==
Bobby LePire at Film Threat said that while the beginning is off-putting, they scored it 8 out of 10 saying that the "uniformly solid cast, effective cinematography, and editing all contribute to its success in communicating its horror and comedy elements." Jason Knight at UK Film Review scored it 3 out of 5, claiming it is for those that "appreciate dark humour, intriguing characters and gore." Kirk Fernwood said it is 3.5 out of 5, stating it is "a blunt force exercise in straight-up insanity paired with legitimately valid statements about the state of our current society." Mark Lakatos scored it 3 out of 5 and said that the "unique visuals and chilling atmosphere make for a solid dose of psychological horror." Stephanie Malone at Morbidly Beautiful compared the character Jordan to Patrick Bateman. They said the film does have its flaws, but scored it 3 out of 5 claiming it is a "smart and satisfyingly sinister film" that is "worthy of an audience." Razooky was nominated for Best Actress at the San Diego Film Awards in 2020.
