= Ryan Binse =

American film producer (born 1984)

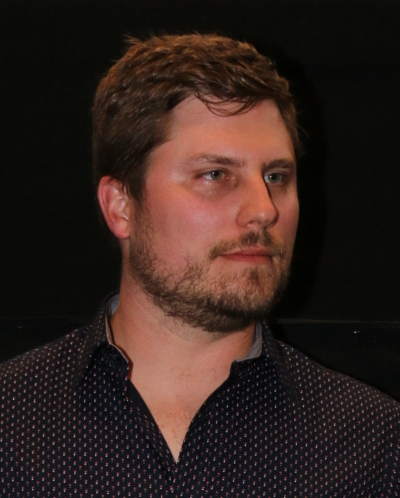
- Binse in 2019
- Born: Ryan William Binse; December 5, 1984 (age 40); Houston, Texas, U.S.
- Education: Excelsior University (BS); American Film Institute (MFA)
- Occupation: Film producer
- Employers: HBO; Silver Pictures
- Notable work: Project MKHEXE; A Rodeo Film; South of 8; We All Die Alone
- Parents: George Binse; Mary Bick

Ryan William Binse is an American film producer and United States Navy veteran who produced the films Project MKHEXE (2025), South of 8 (2016), A Rodeo Film (2019), and We All Die Alone (2021). He served in the U.S. Navy from 2005–2016 before his career in film production through the UCLA Extension and AFI Conservatory.

== Personal life ==
Binse was born in Houston, Texas, to George Binse and Mary Bick in 1984. He graduated in 2003 from James E. Taylor High School and joined the United States Navy under the Delayed Entry Program. Binse began training at Recruit Training Command, Great Lakes, Illinois, in 2005. He was promoted to petty officer first class and served until 2016 when he received a Bachelor of Science – Nuclear at Excelsior College and Certificate – Producing at UCLA Extension.

== Career ==
In 2017, Binse was fixing electrical boxes on ships when he produced Fletcher and Jenks, a film initially made for the 48 Hour Film Project, that received multiple nominations at GI Film Festival San Diego.

In 2018, he found work in the production department at HBO through Veterans in Media & Entertainment Internship program. In 2019, he produced A Rodeo Film by Darius Dawson when he got his Master of Fine Arts – Producing at AFI Conservatory and interned at Silver Pictures. Dawson said he and Binse plan to turn that project into a feature film.

In 2022, a film he produced called We All Die Alone screened at GI Film Festival San Diego and Dances with Films. In 2025, Binse produced Gerald Robert Waddell's film Project MKHEXE which included a crew of AFI alumni. The film was exclusively released on Screambox.

== Filmography ==
Feature films
Year	Title	Producer	Actor	Role	Notes
2016	South of 8	Yes	Yes	SAF Assassin #1	
2021	The Baby Pact	Line producer	No	—	
2025	Project MKHEXE	Yes	Yes	Wyatt	

Short films
Year	Title	Producer	Notes
2016	Fletcher and Jenks	Yes	
2017	John's Big Day	Yes	Also writer, director, editor, cinematography by Ray Gallardo
2019	A Rodeo Film	Yes	
2021	We All Die Alone	Yes	
2025	On Earth, as It Is in Heaven	Yes	Directed by Michael Cudlitz

== Accolades ==
Festival	Year	Title	Award	Result	Ref.
48 Hour Film Project, San Diego	2016	Fletcher and Jenks	Best Film	Nominated	
GI Film Festival San Diego	2017	Fletcher and Jenks	Best Film Made by a Veteran or Service Member	Nominated	
San Diego Film Week	2017	South of 8	Best Horror/Sci-Fi/Thriller Feature	Won	
San Diego Film Awards	2017	South of 8	Best Narrative Feature Film	Nominated	
American Black Film Festival	2020	A Rodeo Film	HBO Short Film Award	Finalist	
South Georgia Film Festival	2020	A Rodeo Film	Best Featurette	Won	
Burbank International Film Festival	2022	We All Die Alone	Best LGBTQ Short Film	Won	
Georgia Shorts Film Festival	2022	We All Die Alone	Best Dark Comedy	Won	
Idyllwild International Festival of Cinema	2022	We All Die Alone	Best Short Film	Nominated	
Idyllwild International Festival of Cinema	2022	We All Die Alone	Indie Spirit Award	Won	
Oceanside International Film Festival	2022	We All Die Alone	Best Narrative Short Film	Nominated	
Reeling: The Chicago LGBTQ+ International Film Festival	2022	We All Die Alone	Best Narrative Short – Audience Choice Award	Won	
