= Ignacyo Matynia =

Polish-American actor (born 1992)

- Born: Ignacyo Mateusz Matynia; Busko Zdroj, Poland
- Education: University at Albany, SUNY
- Occupation: Actor
- Years active: 2014–present
- Awards: See below

Ignacyo Mateusz Matynia is a Polish born, American raised actor known for his performance in the feature film Break Every Chain as Police Officer Jonathan Hickory. He's starred in multiple made for TV films such as the Lifetime original film My Nightmare Landlord (2020), The Man in the Guest House and Breaking Girl Code His notable television credits include guest starring spots on Law and Order: SVU, Vida, Marvel's Luke Cage, Forever and Dietland.

== Early life ==
Matynia was born in Busko Zdroj, Poland and moved with his family to the United States, settling in Brooklyn, NY. After graduating from Xaverian High School, he began his studies at the SUNY University of Albany with a desire to go to medical school. But it was there that he began his passion for acting, he dropped out of college to pursue this as a career, while working part-time as a DJ.

== Career ==
In 2014, Matynia was discovered by Sedly Bloomfield of the Lee Strasberg Theatre and Film Institute, who became his mentor. His studies led him to star in over 40 short films, some of which earned him numerous awards and nominations at film festivals, including the Idyllwild International Festival of Cinema. That same year, he made his feature film acting debut in The Grievance Group. He then went on to appear in guest roles on television shows including ABC's Forever, Marvel Studios' Luke Cage, Starz' Vida and NBC's Law & Order: Special Victims Unit.

In 2018 and 2019, after moving to Los Angeles, he was cast in the feature films Like Dogs and One and the Same, the latter of which was released by Gravitas Ventures on Blu-ray and on demand on March 23, 2021.

In 2020, Matynia was cast in The Institute and Break Every Chain, two of the first films that were able to proceed with production, with COVID-19 safety measures in place. The latter film, in which he plays police officer Jonathan Hickory, who wrote the autobiographical novel the film is based on, held its world premiere on February 20, 2021, in Tempe, Arizona.

== Personal life ==
Matynia is Catholic.

== Filmography ==
=== Film ===
| Year | Title | Role | Notes | Ref. |
|---|---|---|---|---|
| 2014 | My Craigslist Hook-Up | Bert | Short film | |
| 2014 | Bright Shadow | Jason Jones | Short film | |
| 2014 | The Grievance Group | Gavel | | |
| 2014 | The Grievance Group: The Pardon | Gavel | | |
| 2016 | La Petite Mort | Ordo Magnus Gaudens member | Short film | |
| 2016 | 264 Days | Adam | Short film | |
| 2016 | Roselyn | William Bennington | Short film | |
| 2016 | Fadó | Stephen Brown | Short film; also producer | |
| 2016 | Kun Fayakun | Henry | Short film; also producer | |
| 2016 | Get Happy! | Regular at Happyning | | |
| 2016 | Girl Problems | Chad Richards | Television film | |
| 2017 | The Choices We Make | Jake Monroe | Short film | |
| 2017 | My Brothers Keeper | Banquo | | |
| 2017 | Gym Problems | Ben Williams | Short film | |
| 2017 | The Cabinet in the Woods | Carl | Short film | |
| 2017 | The Arrangement | Brad | Short film | |
| 2017 | Roaring Tides | Joey | Short film | |
| 2018 | Private Barry | Private Edwin Thompson | Short film | |
| 2018 | Ben's Entanglement | Ben | Short film | |
| 2018 | Christmas Camp | Ryan | Hallmark Channel television film | |
| 2018 | Nice Things | Jake | Short film | |
| 2019 | Life Coach | Connor | | |
| 2019 | Paradise Program | Cyan Hoffman | Short film | |
| 2020 | My Nightmare Landlord | Drew | Lifetime television film | |
| 2020 | Scarlet | RE Agent | Short film | |
| 2021 | Break Every Chain | Jonathan Hickory | | |
| 2021 | One and the Same | Kenny McCoy | | |
| 2021 | Like Dogs | Adam | | |
| 2022 | The Institute | Daniel Sullivan | | |
| 2022 | Higher Grounds | Razzorakk | Short film | |
| 2023 | Breaking Girl Code | Ethan St. Ignace | Lifetime television film | |
| 2023 | A Christmas Vintage | Parker Williams | | |
| 2024 | The Man in the Guest House | Brandon Burke | Lifetime television film | |
| 2024 | Project MKHEXE | Tim | | |

=== Television ===
| Year(s) | Title | Role | Notes | Ref. |
|---|---|---|---|---|
| 2015 | Forever | Young Teddy Graves | Episode: "The Night in Question" | |
| 2016 | Scorned: Love Kills | Mike Turpin | Episode: "Kentucky Thrill Ride" | |
| 2016 | Luke Cage | Thug | Episode: "Just to Get a Rep" | |
| 2016 | Deadly Possessions | Detective | Mini-series; Episode: "Dr. Kevorkian's Death Van and Natalie Wood's Yacht" | |
| 2018 | Dietland | Fullback | Episode: "Monster High" | |
| 2019 | People Magazine Investigates | Chris Smith | Episode: "Vanished" | |
| 2020 | Vida | Cater Waiter | Episode: "Episode 17" | |
| 2020 | 26th Screen Actors Guild Awards | Himself | TV special | |
| 2020 | Bad Influence | Nick | Pilot episode | |
| 2021-2022 | A Good Cop | Jaylen Daniels | Main role | |
| 2022 | Law & Order: Special Victims Unit | Ricky Nowak | Episode: "Tommy Baker's Hardest Fight" | |
| 2022 | Alliance | Blake | 4 episodes | |
| 2023 | Breaking Bread | Self | Episode: "Ignacyo Matynia" | |

== Awards and nominations ==
| Year | Award | Category | Work | Result | Notes | Ref. |
|---|---|---|---|---|---|---|
| 2016 | Los Angeles Independent Film Festival Awards | August Award - Best Actor | Kun Fayakun | Nominated | | |
| 2016 | Los Angeles Independent Film Festival Awards | August Award - Best Experimental Student | Kun Fayakun | Nominated | Shared with Dharius Zulkefli and Diego Cordero | |
| 2016 | Hollywood International Moving Pictures Film Festival | September Award - Best Actor | Kun Fayakun | Won | | |
| 2016 | Hollywood International Moving Pictures Film Festival | September Award - Best Drama | Kun Fayakun | Won | Shared with Dharius Zulkefli and Diego Cordero | |
| 2016 | Grove Film Festival, New Jersey | Best Actor | The Cabinet in the Woods | Won | | |
| 2017 | IndieFEST Film Awards | Actor: Leading | The Choices We Make | Won | | |
| 2017 | Brightside Tavern Film Festival | Best Actor - Horror | The Cabinet in the Woods | Won | | |
| 2018 | Idyllwild International Festival of Cinema | Best Actor - Featurette | The Cabinet in the Woods | Nominated | | |
| 2018 | Idyllwild International Festival of Cinema | Best Ensemble Cast - Featurette | The Cabinet in the Woods | Won | Shared with Lauren Dougherty and Karen Sweeney | |
| 2019 | New Jersey Web Festival | Best Ensemble Cast In a Comedy | Labeled | Won | | |
| 2019 | New Jersey Horror Con and Film Festival | Best Actor | The Cabinet in the Woods | Won | | |
| 2019 | International New York Film Festival | Gold Award - Best Actor | Private Barry | Won | | |
| 2021 | Vegas Movie Awards | Award of Prestige - Best Actor | Break Every Chain | Won | | |
| 2021 | Falcon International Film Festival | Best Actor | Break Every Chain | Won | | |
| 2021 | International Police Awards Art Festival | Best Actor | Break Every Chain | Won | | |
| 2021 | IndieX Film Fest | Best Actor | Jesters Paradise | Nominated | | |
| 2021 | Independent Shorts Awards | Bronze Award - Best Actor | Jesters Paradise | Won | | |
| 2021 | Canadian International Faith and Family Film Festival | Best Actor | Break Every Chain | Won | | |
| 2021 | Green Mountain Christian Film Festival | Best Actor | Break Every Chain | Won | | |
