= Like Dogs =

- Directed by: Randy Van Dyke
- Written by: Randy Van Dyke
- Produced by: Amos Burns; Kelly Faltis
- Starring: Annabel Barret; Ignacyo Matynia
- Cinematography: Dakoda Smith
- Edited by: Ryan Hoskins
- Music by: Rene G. Boscio
- Production companies: Epic Level Entertainment; Temporary Insanity Productions; Fabletown Entertainment
- Distributed by: Terror Films
- Release date: October 1, 2021
- Running time: 94 minutes
- Country: United States
- Language: English

Like Dogs is a 2021 American horror thriller film written and directed by Randy Van Dyke and starring Annabel Barrett and Ignacyo Matynia.

== Plot ==
Lisa is abducted off the street by two men in a white van, then taken to a facility where she is strapped to a gurney and drugged. She wakes up in a small, concrete space with a dog bed, animal water bottle, and her neck chained behind her. She is given chopped beef in a dog food bowl.

As she misbehaves, such as dumping the food, refusing to eat, and smacking the bowl against the wall, notes detail what happens with interventions listed such as a bath or new choke collar that is remote controlled and tightens to choke the participant.

Lisa finds the food is drugged with something that makes her hallucinate or sleep, depending on her behavior. She also notes a new person at the end of the line of concrete kennels who she learns is Adam. Adam has been here for quite some time and is also chained with a choke collar.

Adam and Lisa slowly get to know each other. When Adam misbehaves, both are hit with electric prods and Lisa is to be separated until Adam behaves. When she is returned, they are slowly moved closer. It is determined by the notes they are integrating the two, with Lisa supposedly being the "alpha". Adam concocts an escape plan where he grabs the pole being used to push his food and hits the guard with it, knocking them out. He steals the keys and unlocks himself and then Lisa, but they still have their collars on. Lisa takes her bowl and hits Adam over the head so he passes out and then yells "Mayday."

It is revealed this is an experiment that Lisa designed with George and Erika through a university grant. Lisa argues to be put back into the experiment, explaining to Adam that what he thought was an escape was a hallucination. They decide then to try and escape by climbing a fence while out in the yard together, but their collars stop them. Adam turns back to Lisa as they choke, which she attributes to him loving her back.

George brings them inside and straps them each to a table in separate rooms in the East Wing, disabling the cameras as he injects each with a hallucinogen that makes them freak out. George goes to lunch while Erika discovers what he has done and calls Fisher, someone higher up at the university that approved the project. She threatens George with jail for administering medications without a license. Fisher then meets separately with Lisa, giving her a dose of adrenaline to wake her up. When Fisher confronts Lisa about the lack of consent paperwork for Adam and the lack of her own documentation including a high school diploma, Lisa strangles Fisher and hides her in the freezer.

Erika grows suspicious of George and attempts to escape him, but finds Fisher's body that George finished murdering. George tricks her and injects her in the neck, causing her to pass out. George makes Lisa and Adam pass out, then ties up Adam and Erika together while Lisa is tied up to watch them talk on camera. Erika reveals everything to Adam. George then wheels Lisa into a new row of kennels where he shows her all of her ex boyfriends that he has captured. He tells her that some of them call her Ashley or Natalie, as well as Lisa. He then takes her to the room with Erika and Adam and gives her a choice on who to choke to death.

Lisa picks Erika, but Adam's choke collar begins. After going back and forth, George chooses for Adam to be strangled. George reveals that Lisa's earlier hallucinations of herself with Adam were actually real interactions she had with George, indicating that he drugged and raped her. Lisa tricks George when he comes back to the room and bites his lip, stealing the keys and freeing herself and Erika. They manage to run and trick George before tying him down to a gurney and putting a choke collar on him. They penetrate him with a shock prod and set off his choke collar, which kills him.

Lisa then hits Erika in the head, telling her that she must make her body unidentifiable and fake her next identity as Erika. She is seen walking out of the building wearing Erika's glasses and clothes as it burns behind her.

The end credits scene depicts a battered Erika crawling out of a burning doorway.

== Cast ==
- Annabel Barrett as Lisa
- Ignacyo Matynia as Adam
- Ryan Q. Tran as George
- Shay Denison as Erica
- Katy Dore as Dr. Fischer

== Reception ==
Evan Dossey of the Midwest Film Journal gave the film a positive review and wrote, "It is, frankly, one of the most gleefully repellent single-set horror films I’ve watched in a long time. I ate it up like a dog and I’d go back for seconds."
