= Break Every Chain (film) =

2021 Christian biographical drama film

- Poster
- Directed by: Tim Searfoss
- Written by: Tim Searfoss; Daniel Fajardo
- Based on: Break Every Chain by Jonathan Hickory
- Produced by: Daniel Fajardo; Tim Searfoss
- Starring: Ignacyo Matynia; Dean Cain; Krystian Leonard
- Cinematography: Tim Searfoss
- Edited by: Tim Searfoss
- Production company: JC Films
- Distributed by: Bridgestone Multimedia Group
- Release dates: February 20, 2021 (Tempe, Arizona); December 7, 2021 (Worldwide)
- Running time: 103 minutes
- Country: United States
- Language: English

Break Every Chain is a 2021 American Christian biographical drama film directed and co-written by Tim Searfoss and based on the autobiographical novel of the same name by Jonathan Hickory. The film stars Ignacyo Matynia as Hickory, along with Dean Cain and Krystian Leonard.

== Synopsis ==
The following synopsis was written by Jonathan Hickory and can be found on the Break Every Chain official site.

”Drowning in the depths of depression and sadness, burning with anger, and chained down by alcoholism, Jonathan couldn't do anymore. After the loss of his father as a young boy, facing countless horrific death scenes in the line of duty, and the death of his son, Jonathan turned to the world for answers—finding only darkness. Facing the threat of losing his job as a police officer, the loss of his wife and daughter, and contemplating suicide, Jonathan turns to the only One who can truly save.”

== Cast ==
- Ignacyo Matynia as Jonathan Hickory
  - Brayden Lacer as young Jonathan Hickory
- Dean Cain as Pastor Gabe
- Krystian Leonard as Stacy Hickory
- Collins Randolph as Ana Hickory
- Sterling Morse Jr. as Officer Watson
- Dennis P. Marburger as Officer Rodriguez
- Dennis Knight as Lieutenant Campbell
- Jeremiah Clark as Officer Edwards
- Deborah Thompson as Jonathan's Mother
- Don Brooks as Jonathan's Father
- Joseph Moreland as Daniel's Dad

== Production ==
=== Development ===
Hickory first wrote and published the novel in 2018, which detailed his real-life experience as a police officer and the struggles he faced with depression, loss and alcoholism and the eventual redemption he achieved. In 2020, JC Films bought the rights to produce a film adaptation of the novel, in which Dean Cain would star as Pastor Gabe. Later that year, Krystian Leonard joined the cast as Stacy Hickory, followed by Ignacyo Matynia in the lead role of Jonathan Hickory.

=== Filming ===
Principal photography took place in Bridgeport, West Virginia and Shinnston, West Virginia throughout the summer of 2020, with COVID-19 safety measures in place.

== Release ==
The film held its world premiere on February 20, 2021 at the Sun Valley Church in Tempe, Arizona, coinciding with the grand opening of an Arizona-based studio facility for JC Films. A distribution agreement was entered with Bridgestone Multimedia Group (BMG) for worldwide distribution on digital platforms and DVD/Blu-Ray—the film released worldwide on streaming on December 7, 2021. The film is also being shown as a ministry tool in churches.

== Awards ==
Best Inspirational Film, Prague International Monthly Film Festival, April 2021

Best Inspirational Film, Paris International Film Awards, May 2021

Best Inspirational Film, Vegas Movie Awards, June 2021

Best Actor— Ignacyo Matynia, Vegas Movie Awards

Best Inspirational Film, New York International Film Festival, May 2021

Best Debut Filmmaker for Feature Film—Tim Searfoss, Uruvatti International Film Festival, 2021

Best Inspirational Film, Falcon International Film Festival, London, UK, 2021

Best Actor— Ignacyo Matynia, Falcon International Film Festival, London, UK, 2021

Best Inspirational Film, Los Angeles Film Awards, 2021

Best Director— Tim Searfoss, International Police Awards Art Festival, Florence, Italy, 2021

Best Actor— Ignacyo Matynia, International Police Awards Art Festival, Florence, Italy, 2021

Best Soundtrack, International Police Awards Art Festival, Florence, Italy, 2021

Best Film, Tampa Bay Motion Picture Industry Professionals, Tampa Bay, FL 2021

Best Feature Film, Christian Family Film Festival, 2021

Best Feature Film; Festival Award Winner, Great Lakes Christian Film Festival, 2021

Best Actor- Ignacyo Matynia, Canadian International Faith and Family Film Festival

Best Supporting Actor- Dean Cain, Green Mountain Christian Film Festival

Best Picture, Green Mountain Christian Film Festival

Best Actor- Ignacyo Matynia, Green Mountain Christian Film Festival

Best Director Runner-up- Tim Searfoss, Green Mountain Christian Film Festival

Best Film, Salty Earth Film Festival

Best Film, UK Christian Film Festival

Best Cinematography, UK Christian Film Festival

Best Inspirational Feature Film, Nieves International Christian Film Festival

Best Picture—3rd place, International Christian Film & Music Festival (ICFF)
