= A Rodeo Film =

2019 American film by Darius Dawson

- Poster
- Directed by: Darius Dawson
- Written by: Darius Dawson
- Produced by: Ryan Binse
- Starring: Jermelle Simon; Phrederic Semaj; Charlee Earle
- Cinematography: Erin G. Wesley
- Edited by: Briana Chmielewski
- Music by: Kyle Woods
- Distributed by: HBO Max
- Release dates: April 2019 (San Diego Film Week); February 2, 2021
- Running time: 19 minutes
- Country: United States
- Language: English

A Rodeo Film is a 2019 American drama short film written and directed by Darius Dawson and produced by Ryan Binse. The film was released on HBO Max on February 2, 2021.

== Plot ==
A bull rider no longer in love with the sport chooses between his family's rodeo legacy and his own life aspirations.

== Cast ==
- Jermelle Simon as Averill
- Phrederic Semaj as Harland
- Charlee Earle as Frankie

== Production ==
Principal photography took place near San Diego. The film was inspired by Christopher Nolan and Dawson's time living in Singapore. It was made at the American Film Institute. Dawson hopes it raises awareness about Black cowboy culture and rodeo athletes. Larry Poole is one of the film's executive producers.

== Release ==
A Rodeo Film screened at the Toronto Black Film Festival, Urbanworld Film Festival, Prison City Film Festival and BronzeLens Film Festival and was distributed on February 2, 2021, by HBO Max.

== Reception ==
Dawson won the West Region's African American Student Film Award at the Directors Guild of America Awards and Best Student Film at GI Film Festival San Diego.
