= South of 8 =

2016 American film by Tony Olmos

- Poster
- Directed by: Tony Olmos
- Written by: Tony Olmos
- Produced by: Ryan Binse; Jeanette Di Pinza; George Jac; Tony Olmos; Luke Pensabene
- Starring: Brian Patrick Butler; George Jac; Jennifer Paredes; Kathryn Schott; Raye Richards; Luke Pensabene; Shane P. Allen; Michael C. Burgess
- Cinematography: Tony Olmos
- Edited by: Tony Olmos
- Music by: Sergio Corona
- Production company: Rosewood Five
- Distributed by: MultiVisionnaire Pictures
- Release dates: September 26, 2016 (Downtown Los Angeles Film Festival); July 30, 2019 (VOD)
- Running time: 91 minutes
- Country: United States
- Language: English
- Budget: $9,000

South of 8 is a 2016 American crime drama heist film written and directed by Tony Olmos in his directorial debut. The film stars Brian Patrick Butler, George Jac, Jennifer Paredes, Kathryn Schott, and Raye Richards.

The story is centered around a young group of criminals in San Diego knocking off banks in the dystopian future. It was made with a guerrilla filmmaking approach and premiered at the Downtown Los Angeles Film Festival in 2016 where it won Best Dramatic Screenplay.

== Plot ==
San Diego in the 2040s has unemployment and crime at an all-time high. Government surveillance, mass poverty and drought has decimated much of the population. Revolutionary groups and economic divide has caused society to be on the brink of another Great Depression in the United States.

Victor Vasquez (George Jac) is released from prison and subsequently forms a group called "The Vanishers" with Ryan Bertrand (Brian Patrick Butler) and Lori Randolph (Kathryn Schott). In disguise, Bertrand is a bank robber, Vasquez is the getaway driver and Randolph is a hacker who disrupts surveillance drones scouting the area. After conducting several heists, the group lays low for a while. Vasquez meets Emma (Jennifer Paredes) who wants him to leave the life of crime, but "The Vanishers" are in too deep with Lt. Armando Harris (Shane P. Allen), a detective closing in on them.

After a case of mistaken identity, Bertrand hires a mercenary named Benji (Luke Pensabene) and a thief named Lola 5 (Raye Richards), the last surviving member of a group of women vigilantes known as "The Lolas." They take on more banks, and come across Johannes Koppel (Michael C. Burgess), a diamond merchant who seeks to exact revenge on the group. The group retreats to a safe house with Emma.

== Cast ==
- Brian Patrick Butler as Ryan Bertrand
- George Jac as Victor Vasquez
- Jennifer Paredes as Emma
- Kathryn Schott as Lori Randolph
- Raye Richards as Lola 5
- Luke Pensabene as Benji
- Shane P. Allen as Lt. Armando Harris
- Michael C. Burgess as Johannes Koppel

== Production ==
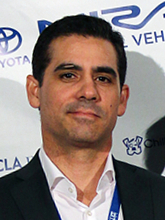
Writer, director, and producer Tony Olmos

Originally intended to be a short film, Tony Olmos said the idea of the story was if past gangsters had existed in the future. Principal photography occurred in San Diego County, including Ramona and downtown, with a local cast and crew and a $9,000 budget.

During an interview with IntelleXual Entertainment, Jac said it was a guerrilla film because the schedule of filming had to be spread out over a year. Butler stated Olmos was inspired by spaghetti westerns and compared the style of filmmaking to El Mariachi and Reservoir Dogs.

Olmos said he obtained injuries to his hand and foot during production that required him to be in a wheelchair throughout completion. Filming and editing was finalized in a span of 18 months and the film is Olmos' directorial debut.

Ryan Binse, George Jac and Luke Pensabene produced the film and Sergio Corona composed the score with Olmos. Musical artists that contributed to the soundtrack include Freedom Fries, Mother Mary Mood, Somerset Barnard and Spero.

== Release ==
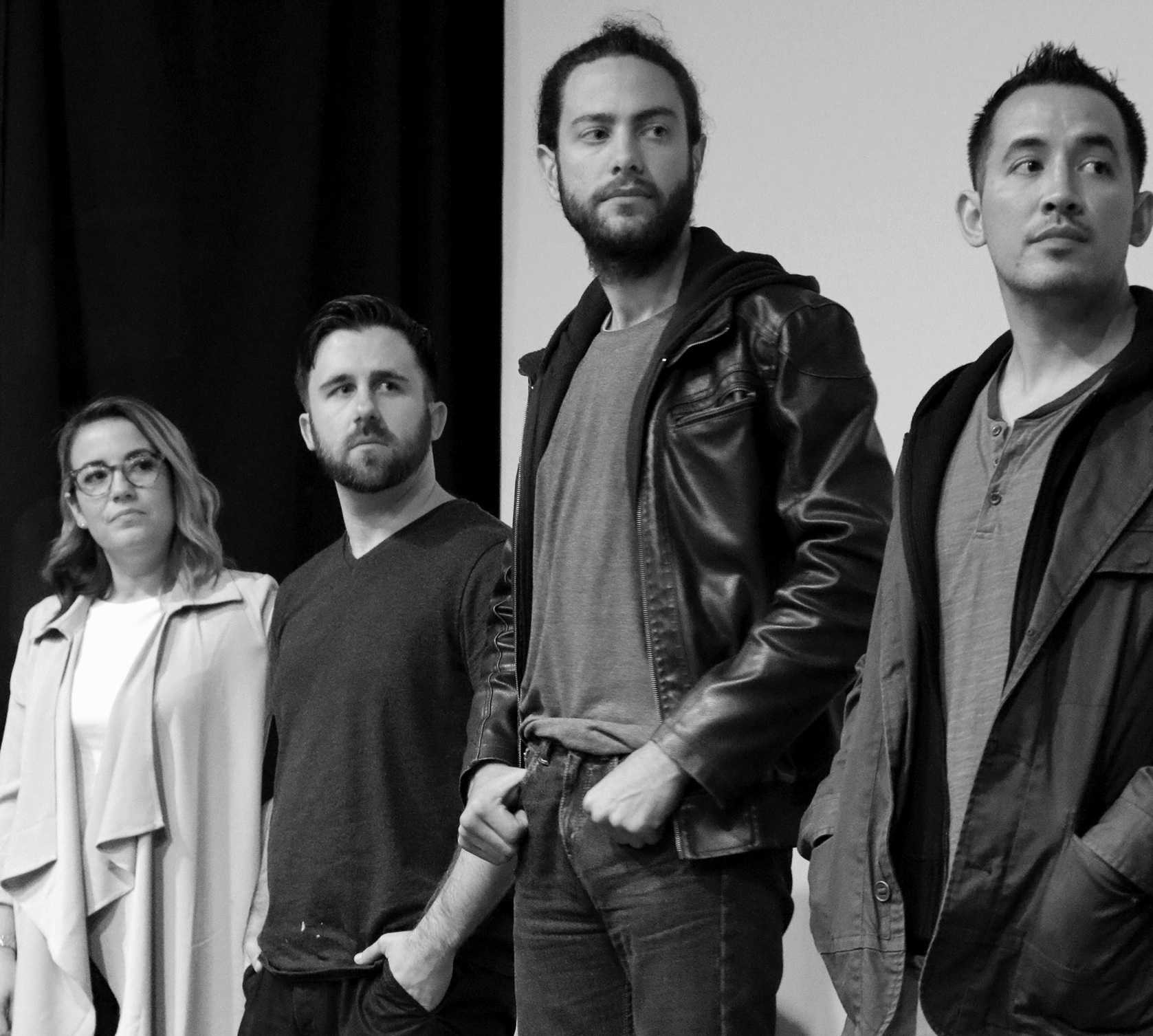
Left to right: Richards, Butler, Pensabene, and Jac in 2017

South of 8 premiered on September 26, 2016, at the Downtown Los Angeles Film Festival and later screened at San Diego Film Week before being distributed by MultiVisionnaire Pictures. It was released on video on demand on July 30, 2019.

== Reception ==
=== Critical response ===
Emilie Black of Cinema Crazed wrote the film has potential citing "the story, directing, acting, and music are good" but also noted it had "framing, lighting, and focus issues". Jodi Cilley said that "South of 8 is a fantastic example of what can be produced in San Diego." Meeta Borah at Sportskeeda wrote it is an "action-packed dystopian movie like Badland Hunters."

South of 8 ranks #3 on Times of San Diego's 10 off-the-wall movies filmed in San Diego.

=== Accolades ===
Festival	Year	Award	Recipient	Result	Ref.
Downtown Los Angeles Film Festival	2016	Best Dramatic Screenplay	Tony Olmos	Won	
San Diego Film Awards	2016	Best Trailer	Tony Olmos	Won	
San Diego Film Awards	2017	Best Narrative Feature Film	South of 8	Nominated	
San Diego Film Week	2017	Best Horror/SciFi/Thriller Feature	South of 8	Won	

== Crossover ==
Olmos expanded this universe in his follow up film; the comedy horror Continuance premiered at Shockfest on December 10, 2021.
