= Escondido High School =

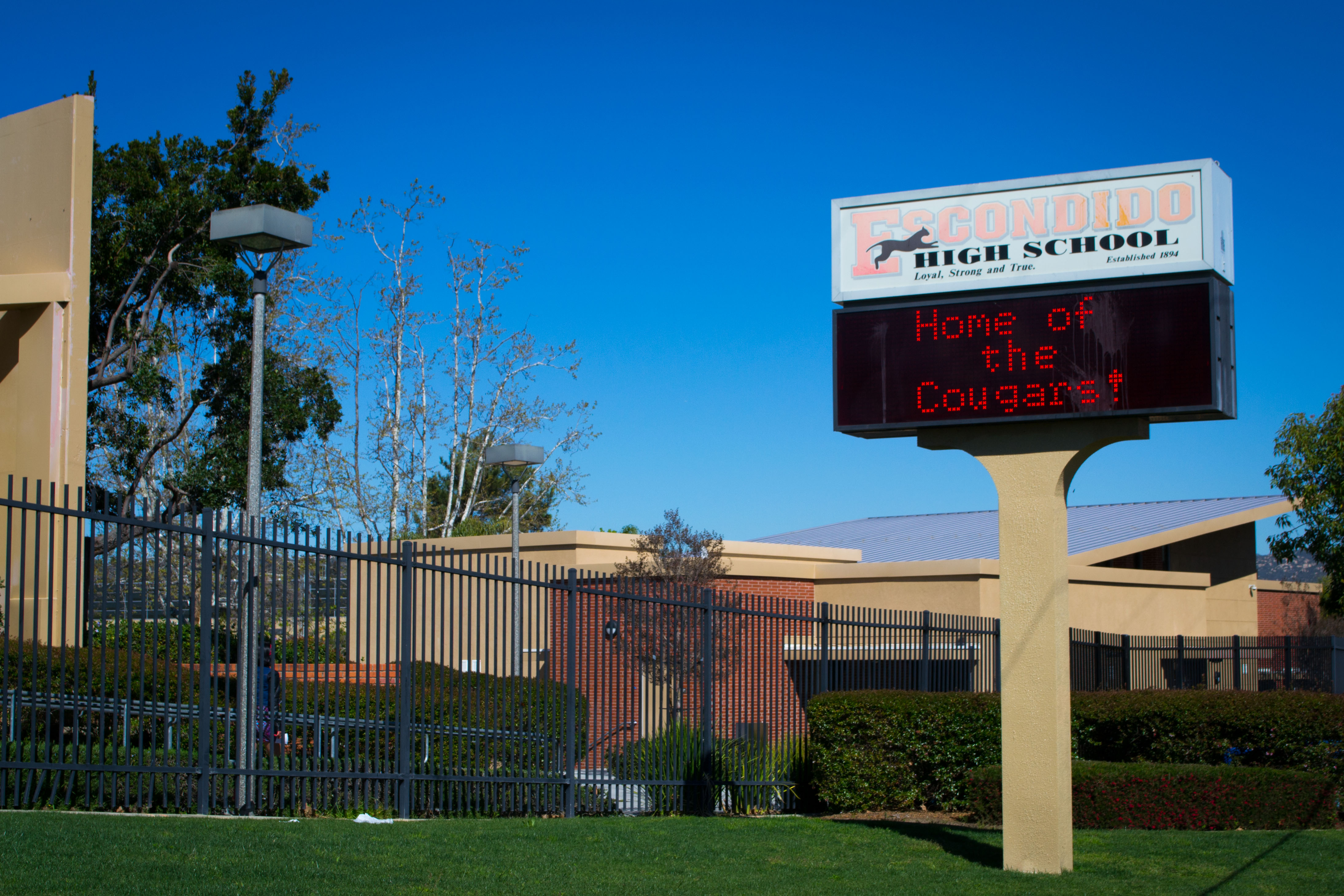

Location
- 1535 North Broadway; Escondido, California 92025; United States; 33.146°N 117.092°W

Information
- Type: Public high school
- Motto: Loyal, strong & true
- Established: 1894
- School district: Escondido Union High School District
- Staff: 98.21 (FTE)
- Grades: 9–12
- Enrollment: 1,771 (2023–2024)
- Student to teacher ratio: 18.03
- Colors: Orange, black and white
- Mascot: Cougar
- Rival: San Pasqual High School; Orange Glen High School
- Newspaper: The Cougar
- Yearbook: The Gong
- Website: http://www.ehscougars.com

Escondido High School (EHS) is a high school in Escondido, California. It is part of Escondido Union High School District. Escondido High received a California Distinguished School award in 2007.

== History ==
The first building to house Escondido High School was located in downtown Escondido. The University of Southern California (USC) constructed it in 1889 for use as a Methodist seminary. The seminary operated for ten years but eventually closed due to lack of finances. USC donated the building to a man named Henry Putnam, who himself gave it to the Escondido Union High School District. Overcrowding prompted the construction of a three-story building just south of the original site; this new building opened in 1927. The original building burned down in 1929.

The severe damage to many school buildings in the 1933 Long Beach earthquake prompted the California State Legislature to pass the Field Act, mandating that school buildings be earthquake-resistant. The state inspected EHS and found the campus to be unsafe, but the inspection report was never acted upon. In the 1950s, the district wanted to construct a new high school to address overcrowding. The new school was to be named Vallecitos High School and located at the present-day North Broadway site. Two bond measures were required to fund construction. When the district began the process of submitting the second bond measure, the state confronted them with the old inspection report. The state again declared the campus unsafe and then required the district to vacate EHS before attempting the bond measure. Classes were moved to the partially completed Vallecitos High, temporary tents, and the buildings at EHS that were still considered safe. The North Broadway campus was completed in 1954. The Vallecitos name was dropped and the campus took the Escondido High name. The downtown campus was fully demolished in the mid-1980s.

== Sports ==
Year-Round

- Sideline Cheerleading

Fall

- Boys/Girls Cross Country
- Girls Field Hockey
- Football
- Girls Golf
- Girls Tennis
- Girls Volleyball
- Boys Water Polo

Winter

- CIF Cheerleading
- Boys Basketball
- Girls Basketball
- Boys Soccer
- Girls Soccer
- Girls Water Polo
- Wrestling

Spring

- Baseball
- Boys Golf
- Softball
- Girls/Boys Swimming
- Boys Tennis
- Girls/Boys Track and Field
- Boys Volleyball

== Faces of Death film ==
On June 17, 1985, high school math teacher Bart Schwartz showed the film Faces of Death to students in the school. Two students, Diane Geese and Sherry Forget, claimed to have been traumatized and later sued the school; they were compensated. Schwarz was suspended without pay for 15 days.

== October 2007 wildfires ==
During the California wildfires of October 2007, Escondido High School was an emergency shelter for evacuees, along with Mission Hills High School, Mission Hills Church, and Calvin Christian School.

== 2024 Teacher misconduct controversy ==
In August 2024, Escondido High School experienced significant controversy following the arrest of Ky Iri Tisdale, a 31-year-old math teacher at the school, on multiple charges of sexual misconduct. Allegations against Tisdale included having unlawful sexual relationships with two former students: a female who is now 19 years old and a male who is one year younger. The Escondido Police Department pursued the case after receiving a report of sexual misconduct and initiated an investigation through the Family Protection Unit.

On August 9, 2024, Tisdale was apprehended while preparing his classroom for the new academic year. Authorities executed a search warrant at his residence and seized his phone and computer for evidence. Tisdale faces a total of 26 charges, including felony counts of oral copulation with a minor and unlawful sexual intercourse with a minor. If convicted, he could face up to 19 years and 8 months in prison.

Tisdale has been placed on administrative leave pending the legal proceedings. The Escondido Union High School District responded to the situation with an official statement from Superintendent Jon Peterson, expressing deep concern over the allegations and confirming that appropriate actions were taken upon learning of Tisdale's arrest.

As the investigation continues, authorities have indicated that additional charges may be forthcoming as they gather more evidence regarding the alleged misconduct. Tisdale is currently being held on $250,000 bail and is scheduled for a court appearance to address the charges.

== Notable alumni ==
- Pete Coscarart, first Major League Baseball player signed out of San Diego State University in California
- Mike Frank, Major League Baseball outfielder
- Tony Gorodeckas, actor
- Dashon Johnson, professional boxer/ MMA
- Randy Johnson, Major League infielder and Minor League field coordinator for the San Diego Padres
- John Mallinger, professional golfer
- Mark Redman, All-Star Major League Baseball pitcher and member of the 2003 World Series Champion Florida Marlins
- Randy Vasquez, actor and director
- Mark Wiebe, professional golfer

== See also ==
- List of high schools in San Diego County, California
