= The Institute (2022 film) =

- Directed by: Hamza Zaman
- Written by: Hamza Zaman
- Produced by: Victorya Brandart; Robert Eisenberg; Jeff Kirby; Chelsea Roth; Jonathan Sethna; Ron Verstappen; Tom West; Hamza Zaman; Artemus Cole
- Starring: Ignacyo Matynia; Victorya Brandart
- Cinematography: Aram Bauman
- Edited by: Michael Patrick Kelly; Spencer Smith
- Music by: Paco Periago
- Production companies: Headless Films; Whiptail Wallaby Productions; Conducive Productions; MindBender Entertainment
- Distributed by: Gravitas Ventures; Kamikaze Dogfright
- Release date: March 22, 2022
- Running time: 89 minutes
- Country: United States
- Language: English

The Institute is a 2022 American thriller film directed by Hamza Zaman and starring Ignacyo Matynia and Victorya Brandart. It is Zaman's feature directorial debut.

== Cast ==
- Ignacyo Matynia as Daniel Sullivan
- Victorya Brandart as Marie Sullivan
- Mark Lobene as Dr. Arthur Lands
- Joy Donze as Blu Foster
- Claire McClain as Izzy Alibrahim
- Louisa Bradshaw as Mel Williams
- Jarred Harper as Steve Williams
- John Easterlin as Dr. Kramer

== Release ==
In March 2022, it was announced that Gravitas Ventures and Kamikaze Dogfright acquired North American distribution rights to the film, which was released on March 22, 2022.

== Reception ==
Cody Hamman of JoBlo.com gave the film a negative review, writing that it "doesn’t quite work as a whole."

Evan Dossey of the Midwest Film Journal also gave the film a negative review and wrote, "The problem is that this film completely lacks a psychological thriller aspect, and Marie isn’t really written with the internal life to carry such a story."
