= Everyman's War =

- DVD release poster
- Directed by: Thad Smith
- Written by: Craig D. Smith
- Produced by: Jay Lance; James WilderHancock; Joel Stirnknob; Thad Smith
- Starring: Cole Carson; Lauren Bair; Michael J. Prosser
- Cinematography: Joel Stirnknob
- Edited by: Alex Brown
- Music by: Chad Rehman
- Production companies: One-Eighty Films; Virgil Films & Entertainment; X-Factor Entertainment
- Distributed by: Virgil Films & Entertainment
- Release date: May 22, 2009
- Running time: 104 minutes
- Country: United States
- Language: English

Everyman's War is an independent narrative feature war film directed by Thad Smith. It was released on DVD in the U.S. on May 18, 2010, by Virgil Films & Entertainment and in 43 countries internationally by Koan Entertainment. Additionally it was released in Spain by Paramount Pictures in May 2010 under the title "Los héroes de Las Árdenas." Based on the true story of Sgt. Don Smith of the 94th Infantry Division. Much of the film takes place during January 1945 near Nennig, Germany in the Battle of the Bulge. The film was judged 'Best Narrative Feature' at the 2009 GI Film Festival and a "Film Excellence" award for directing by the Film Oregon Alliance.

== Cast ==
- Cole Carson as Sgt. Don Smith
- Laurent Bair as Dorrine
- Mike Prosser as Cpl. Starks
- Sean McGrath as Pvt. Benedetto
- Eric Martin Reid as Pvt. Fuller
- Brian Julian as Pvt. Heinrich

== Awards ==
- 2009 GI Film Festival Best Narrative Feature
- 2009 Film Excellence Award by Film Oregon
