= Helmand University =

University in Lashkargah, Afghanistan

- پوهنتون هلمند / د هلمند پوهنتون
- Established: 2006
- Chancellor: Muhammad Nasim Haqqani
- Location: Lashkar Gah, Helmand province, Afghanistan; 31.581312°N 64.366724°E
- Website: www.helu.edu.af

Helmand University (Note: Pashto: د هلمند پوهنتون Dari: پوهنتون هلمند) is a public university in Lashkargah, which is the capital of Helmand Province in southern Afghanistan. It was established in 2006 and its current chancellor is Muhammad Nasim Haqqani.

== Departments ==
=== Departments of Faculty of Economics ===
- Banking
- Management and Administration

=== Departments of Faculty of Agriculture ===
- Horticulture
- Agri-economics and extension
- Animal Sciences
- Plant Sciences

=== Departments of Faculty of Education ===
- Biology
- Chemistry
- Maths
- Geography
- English
- Islamic Culture
- Arts
- Computer
- Vocational Studies

== See also ==
- List of universities in Afghanistan
