= Lashkargah Mosque =

Mosque in Lashkargah, Helmand, Afghanistan

- د لښکرګاه جومات
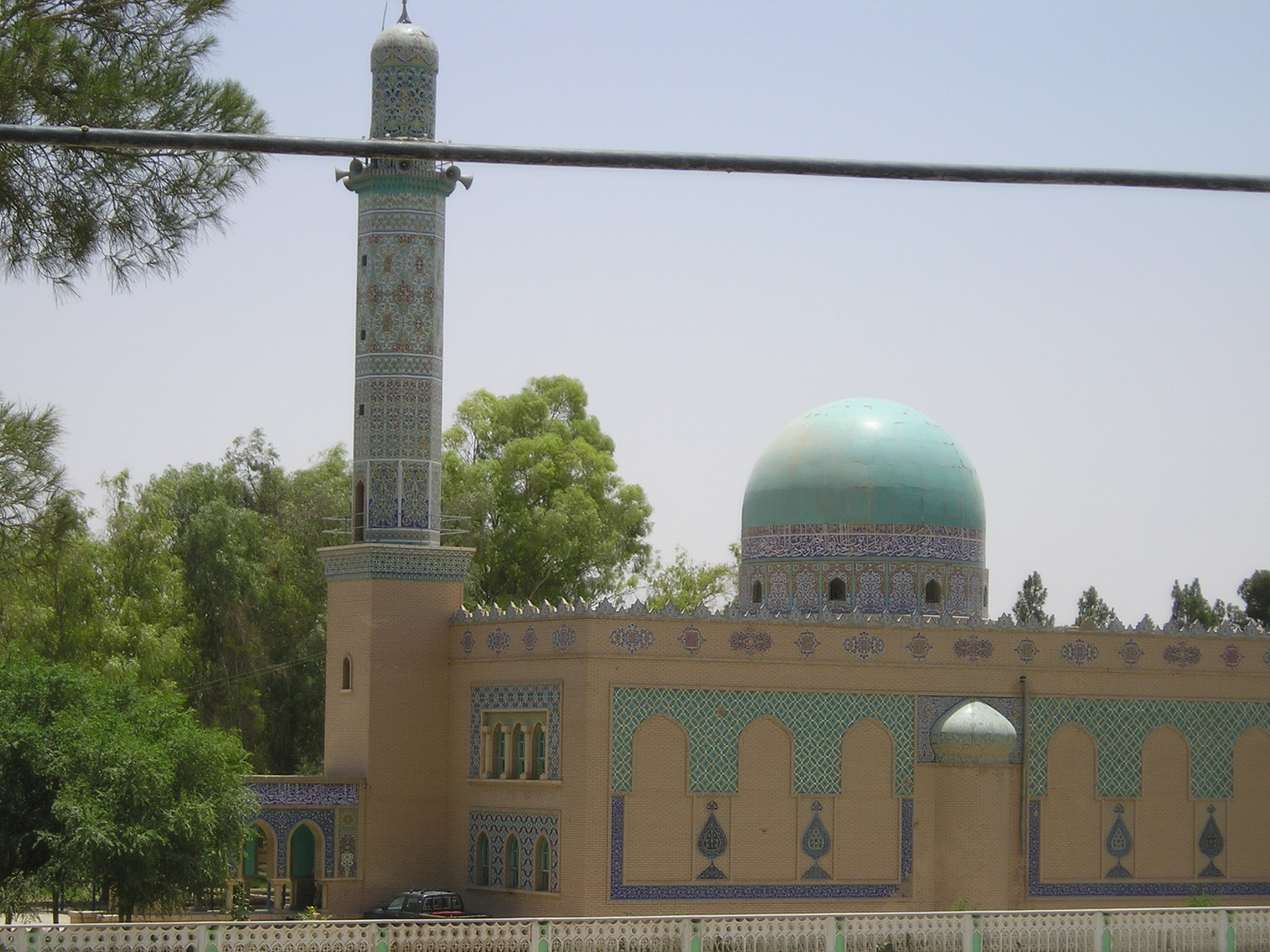
- Lashkargah Mosque in 2005

- Location of the mosque in Afghanistan

Religion
- Affiliation: Islam
- Ecclesiastical or organizational status: Mosque
- Status: Active

Location
- Location: Lashkargah, Helmand Province
- Country: Afghanistan
- Interactive map of Lashkargah Mosque
- Coordinates: 31°35′26″N 64°22′13″E

Specifications
- Dome: One (maybe more)
- Minaret: One

The Lashkargah Mosque (Pashto: د لښکرګاه جومات), also known as the Lashkar Gah Mosque, is a mosque in the city of Lashkargah, in Helmand province of south-western Afghanistan.

== See also ==
- Islam in Afghanistan
- List of mosques in Afghanistan
