= Shepherds of Helmand =

- Film poster
- Directed by: Gary Mortensen
- Produced by: Benchmade; Mike Hagel; Gary Mortensen
- Starring: Paul Dyer; Jerry Glesmann; Dave Hagen; Steve Cooper; Mark Browning; Dominic Oto
- Edited by: Lisa Sherman
- Music by: Stuart Currie
- Production companies: Lucky Forward Films; Media FX
- Release date: February 3, 2011
- Running time: 82 minutes
- Country: United States
- Language: English

Shepherds of Helmand is a war film directed by Gary Mortensen. It premiered on February 3, 2011, by Lucky Forward Films. The documentary follows 17 men from the United States Army, Oregon Army National Guard who volunteered to train a kandak (battalion) of troops from the Afghan National Army. It was the winner of the "Best Documentary" at the Queen's World Film Festival, winner of the "Golden Ace Award" at the Las Vegas Film Festival, and the winner of the "Military Channel Award" at the 2011 GI Film Festival.

== Plot ==
In 2008, 17 volunteers from the Oregon National Guard volunteered to deploy to Afghanistan to train troops of the Afghan National Army in support of Operation Enduring Freedom. They became an Embedded Training Team, or ETT, and were stationed at Camp Phoenix in Kabul. The kandak of Afghan troops was a light infantry unit roughly 200 men strong, and they were equipped with primarily AK-47 rifles, PK machine guns, and Ford Ranger trucks for transportation. The Americans trained the Afghans to be a counter narcotics task force, and they went to Helmand Province to halt illegal opium production and sale which provided the Taliban with money. The US government instead gave the Afghan farmers corn to farm. The tall cornfields, however, turned into ideal ambush locations for Taliban fighters. Unfortunately, the "counter narcotics" unit began smoking the confiscated marijuana and the US troops were powerless to stop them. After much combat alongside soldiers from the Royal Irish Regiment and the Royal Danish Army, the ETT team began leaving the Helmand area to return to Kabul. On the way, an IED destroyed an MRAP and killed CPT Bruno de Solenni from Crescent City, California. The soldiers return home to Oregon, and all try to adjust to civilian life each in their own way. Their accomplishments in Afghanistan were notable, and Captain Paul Dyer mentions how in the first engagement with the Taliban, many of the Afghan soldiers fled or did not fight back, but by the time the Americans were ready to leave, the Afghans had come full-circle, and managed to defend the city of Lashkar Gah against the Taliban with minimal U.S. help. The ETT that these volunteers made up, is one of the most decorated units in National Guard history.

== Cast ==
- Paul Dyer
- Jerry Glesmann
- Dave Hagen
- Steve Cooper
- Mark Browning
- Dominic Oto
