= Tony Olmos =

Mexican-American filmmaker

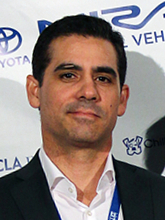
- Olmos in 2016
- Occupations: Film director; cinematographer; screenwriter; film producer; film editor; composer; musician
- Years active: 2015–present
- Known for: Hemet, or the Landlady Don't Drink Tea (2023); Continuance (2021); South of 8 (2016)
- Notable work: Fletcher and Jenks; Pulp Friction
- Awards: 2016 Best Dramatic Screenplay at Downtown Los Angeles Film Festival

Tony Olmos is a Mexican-American filmmaker and musician who is the creator of the films Continuance (2021) and South of 8 (2016), and directed Hemet, or the Landlady Don't Drink Tea (2023), Fletcher and Jenks (2016) and Pulp Friction (2021). He was awarded Best Dramatic Screenplay at the Downtown Los Angeles Film Festival in 2016 and received several nominations at the GI Film Festival San Diego in 2017.

== Personal life ==
Olmos moved to San Diego from Mount Shasta, residing in La Jolla, California. He was previously a musician before becoming a filmmaker.

== Career ==
Olmos filmed his movies in San Diego County, which is where most of them are set in. His work in character development is influenced by Martin Scorsese.

=== Feature films ===
Olmos helped compose the score on his debut film South of 8 and his writing earned him a screenplay award in 2016 at the Downtown Los Angeles Film Festival. His horror comedy film Continuance premiered in 2021 and was a follow up to South of 8. Production issues delayed its release and its festival circuit was hindered by the COVID-19 pandemic in the United States. He later collaborated with screenwriter Brian Patrick Butler by directing the film Hemet, or the Landlady Don't Drink Tea, which received several nominations at the 13th Oceanside International Film Festival in 2024 and was later distributed by BayView Entertainment.

=== Short films ===
Olmos directed the short film Fletcher and Jenks, which was in competition for the 48 Hour Film Project, and it received nominations at the GI Film Festival San Diego in 2017. He worked with producer Mark Atkinson on Pulp Friction, which screened at the San Diego Latino Film Festival in 2022 and was nominated for Award This! in 2023.

== Filmography ==
Year	Title	Director	Cinematographer	Producer	Editor	Writer	Notes
2015	Hatred	No	Yes	No	No	No	Short film
2016	Fletcher and Jenks	Yes	No	No	No	No	Short film
2016	South of 8	Yes	Yes	Yes	Yes	Yes	Also composer
2018	A Hole in the Ground	Yes	Yes	Yes	Yes	Yes	Short film
2021	Pulp Friction	Co-director	Yes	No	Yes	No	Short film
2021	Continuance	Yes	Yes	Yes	Yes	Yes	
2023	Hemet, or the Landlady Don't Drink Tea	Yes	No	Yes	No	No	

== Accolades ==
Festival	Year	Award	Title	Result	Ref.
Downtown Los Angeles Film Festival	2016	Best Dramatic Screenplay	South of 8	Won	
GI Film Festival San Diego	2017	Best Narrative Short	Fletcher and Jenks	Nominated	
GI Film Festival San Diego	2017	Local Choice Award	Fletcher and Jenks	Nominated	
GI Film Festival San Diego	2017	Best Film Made by a Veteran or Service Member	Fletcher and Jenks	Nominated	
Award This!	2023	Award This! Short Film	Pulp Friction	Nominated	
48 Hour Film Project, San Diego	2016	Best Film	Fletcher and Jenks	Nominated	
Idyllwild International Festival of Cinema	2022	Best Director – Short Film	Pulp Friction	Nominated	

== Rosewood Five ==
Rosewood Five
- Industry: Film
- Genre: Action; Drama; Horror; Satire
- Founded: 2016
- Founder: Tony Olmos
- Headquarters: San Diego, California, U.S.
- Website: rosewoodfive.com

Olmos collaborated with Jeanette Di Pinza and Luke Pensabene to form Rosewood Five, a microfilmmaking company that began in 2016 during the production of the film South of 8. The location, situated in the basement of the C Street Inn, was known as Rosewood Five Studios before it became Gray Area Multimedia. It housed some performances of the San Diego International Fringe Festival from 2015 to 2017.

Rosewood Five also produced the films Hatred, Fletcher and Jenks, Flowers for My Garden, Pulp Friction, Continuance, and Hemet, or the Landlady Don't Drink Tea.

Olmos is the founder, and describes the company's projects as captivating stories that address societal issues and brings to mind strong emotions.
