= Project MKHEXE =

- Film poster
- Directed by: Gerald Robert Waddell
- Written by: Gerald Robert Waddell
- Produced by: Sebla Demirbaş; Ryan Binse; Gerald Robert Waddell
- Starring: Ignacyo Matynia; Jordan Knapp; Will Jandro; Jennifer Lynn O'Hara; Dwayne Tarver
- Cinematography: Charlie Cole
- Edited by: Alex Tsagamilis
- Music by: Kyle Woods
- Production companies: Feathered Fish Films; XYZ Films
- Distributed by: Cineverse
- Release date: April 29, 2025 (Screambox)
- Running time: 113 minutes
- Country: United States
- Language: English

Project MKHEXE is a 2025 American found footage horror thriller film written and directed by Gerald Robert Waddell. It stars Ignacyo Matynia, Jordan Knapp, Will Jandro, Jennifer Lynn O'Hara, and Dwayne Tarver.

Presented as a lost, unfinished documentary uploaded to the internet in 2014, the film follows an aspiring filmmaker's investigation into the apparent suicide of his younger brother. It received positive reviews from critics.

== Plot ==
Presented as a lost, unfinished documentary uploaded to the internet in 2014, the film follows aspiring filmmaker Tim Wilson (Ignacyo Matynia), who returns home to document his younger brother Sean's funeral after his unexpected suicide. Days later, Tim finds his parents secretly discarding Sean's belongings. Among the items, he discovers a trove of disturbing material — notes, drawings, tapes, and recordings — all centered around an obscure internet urban legend: Project MKHEXE.

Tim also finds Sean's phone, filled with unsettling videos from the day he died, suggesting he was conducting an experiment at a childhood treehouse. Tim confronts his parents, who deny everything, and enlists the help of Sean's friend Nicole. She reveals Sean had become obsessed with MKHEXE, a supposed Cold War-era CIA mind control experiment blending broadcast tech, hypnosis, and occult practices. The project's alleged "Nightmare Machine" caused madness and death before being covered up and erased from history. Now, any trace of MKHEXE online is mysteriously vanishing.

Inspired by Sean's evidence and a cryptic final voicemail, Tim and Nicole begin filming a documentary to investigate the truth. They find signs MKHEXE is real: testimonies, photos, and strange media sent to Sean anonymously, with signs pointing that the program may continue due to the efforts of an ancient cult who are trying to summon a forgotten god, Kzathguul. But when they try to verify his claims, all the evidence is corrupted or gone.

Tim spirals into paranoia. Family interviews unravel tensions—his mother Gloria is consumed by grief, his father detached, and Tim himself furious. He discovers Nicole broke Sean's heart, driving a wedge between them. Eventually kicked out, Tim relocates and stumbles upon the treehouse, finding the Nightmare Machine and watching the MKHEXE video.

Soon, Tim displays MKHEXE-infection symptoms — paranoia, insomnia, hallucinations. He reunites with Nicole, and they uncover a lost tape of Sean seemingly possessed. As their reality unravels, Tim and Nicole are attacked by infected friends and retreat to her apartment, where they document Tim's decline. They trace MKHEXE's origins to a retired CIA doctor, Viktor Teufel, who hints belief gives MKHEXE power. On the road to find him, Tim crashes the car after another seizure.

The documentary fractures, revealing the grim ending of the tales from the "Box of Nightmares:" suicides, sacrifices, prophetic visions. Back in the present, Tim and Nicole fail to stop the infection spreading at a police station. Nicole is fatally stabbed; she makes Tim promise to broadcast the truth.

Tim returns home, only to see on the TV that Sean was killed by their parents in self-defense. Enraged, Tim murders them. Then, the TV reveals the real story: Sean killed himself to break free from MKHEXE. Horrified, Tim blinds himself and finishes the documentary. In the final moments, the MKHEXE video plays—now fully visible, as viewers have come to believe in it — inviting Kzathguul into our reality.

== Cast ==
- Ignacyo Matynia as Tim Wilson, who investigates his brother Sean's death
  - Marik Knight as Young Tim
- Jordan Knapp as Nicole Martin, a friend of Sean who assists Tim's research
- Will Jandro as Sean Wilson, Tim's dead younger brother
  - Jayden Scala as Young Sean
- Jennifer Lynn O'Hara as Gloria Wilson, Tim and Sean's mother
- Dwayne Tarver as Donald Wilson, Gloria's husband and Tim and Sean's father
- Sebla Demirbaş as Meryem Yildiz
- Katrina Eroen as Kim Eckles
- Joe Solana Simon as Henry Baker Judson
- Gerald Robert Waddell as The Dreamer
- Maren Hill as Heather
- Isaac Andrade as Jake
- Dameon Victorian as David
- Damian C. King as Owen
- Jesse Howland as Steve
- Tessa Rao as Ashleigh
- Katherine Waddell as Lynne
- Alyssa Reichel as Skylar
- Chris Schwartz as Officer Williams
- Zach Smith as Det. Louis Cameron
- Patrick Mulderrig as Det. Doug Bryant
- Glenn Edward as Abner Kasick
- Will Cavitt as Subject 23
- Kendrick Knight as Younger Tim
- Landon Turner as Younger Sean
- Michael Stark as Young Steve
- Logan Kelley as Young Owen
- Johnson Cooley as Carl Eckles
- Gabby Gal as Kim's Daughter
- Kaiden Nicholas Johnson as Kim's Son
- Spenser Adelstein as Chuck
- Ryan Binse as Wyatt
- Charlie Cole as Joe
- Shannon Elaine Sweeney as Allison
- Jai Pellerin as Brett
- Daniel Benjamin Buxton as Tony
- Laura G. Chirinos as Police Admin Assistant
- Anthony Richard Pagliaro as Officer Chuny
- Nick Butler as Punk Bunny

== Development ==
Gerald Robert Waddell began writing Project MKHEXE while he was a graduate student at The American Film Institute Conservatory in 2018. After completing the first draft in 2019, Waddell realized that the script would need to take a "deconstructed documentary approach" in order for every piece of the film to be planned for, causing the shooting draft of the screenplay to balloon to nearly 300 pages.

In multiple interviews, Waddell has stated that the film was his "artistic response to the found footage horror genre. Waddell sought to blend genres by taking a true-crime documentary approach to found-footage horror, with influences from epistolary horror, creepypastas, and cosmic horror. Waddell has stated that his main influences for Project MKHEXE included Werner Herzog's Grizzly Man, Mark Z. Danielewski's House of Leaves, Stephen King's N., and the lost media found-footage documentary The $50 Million Question about the breakup of Dave Chappelle and Neal Brennan's writing partnership.

== Production ==
Pre-production for Project MKHEXE lasted for 3 months in the summer of 2019. Principal photography began on September 30, 2019. Project MKHEXE filmed for 29 days in Los Angeles, California on 17 different cameras from different periods, including the iPhone, Betacam, Hi-8, Canon EOS 5D Mark II, Canon EOS C300, Blackmagic Pocket Cinema Camera, and GoPro Hero cameras. Post-production for the film took place between January 2020 and March 2023.

== Marketing ==
An Alternate Reality Game (ARG) marketing campaign was developed by Gerald Robert Waddell for the film concurrently with the script, to help with word of mouth for the independent film, as a way to expand the lore of the movie, and as a nod to past ARG marketing efforts, including Halo 2's I Love Bees, The Dark Knight's "I Believe in Harvey Dent" ARG campaign, LOST's The LOST Experience, and The Blair Witch Project(1999) website and forum.

Sean's "Relatively Stable Websites" that are mentioned in the film were planned from the script phase and built during post-production, while the website "What is Project MKHEXE?" was designed as a hub full of Easter eggs, puzzles, additional story lore, and a rumored final "Coda" for the film.

Beginning on March 18, 2025, the official Project MKHEXE Instagram account began releasing strange images and video clips with cryptic puzzles as captions. In the following weeks, emails from The Exoheretic Enclave and Justice for Judson went out to horror influencers and movie reviewers, while social media accounts began to explore the urban legend of Project MKHEXE and the "Lost Documentary."

On April 20, 2025, a "conspiracy theorist" wearing a sandwich board walked around Hollywood Boulevard distributing pamphlets while discussing the urban legend and the conspiracy theory of a cover up about Project MKHEXE. The official trailer of Project MKHEXE was released on the official Instagram page on April 21, 2025 and on YouTube by Cineverse on April 23, 2025.

== Release ==
The film was released on Screambox on April 29, 2025, as well as other video on demand platforms, including Amazon Video, Apple TV, Vudu, Google Play, Microsoft Store, and YouTube.

== Reception ==
Sean Parker at 25YL compared the film to In the Mouth of Madness, Videodrome, Paranormal Activity, and V/H/S, claiming it is "the best found footage film of the year so far." Scare Value scored it 3.5 out of 5, saying that "chasing its own loose ends results in a believability that most films struggle to find." Celia Payne at Let's Talk Terror said it "might surprise you with its story and wow you with its attention to detail." Edgar of RottenMind gave the film a 9 out of 10, saying that it is "one of [his] top 10 horror films of the year." Kristi Kar of Film Fugitives wrote that "the film is a brilliant work that mythologizes the contemporary cyber-landscape, its loneliness, and its cocoon-like structure that can unleash liminal beings inside our minds that look too identical to our repressed emotions, deep-rooted trauma, and mortifying grief." Robert Zilbauer of The Scariest Things wrote "Project MKHEXE is a superb example of the slow-burn documentary-style horror movie. Even though the pacing might drift a bit in the third act, the story already has you by the throat and won't let go."
