= Lashkargah =

City in Helmand Province, Afghanistan

Lashkargah: لښکرگاه; لشکرگاه; Bost
- Provincial capital
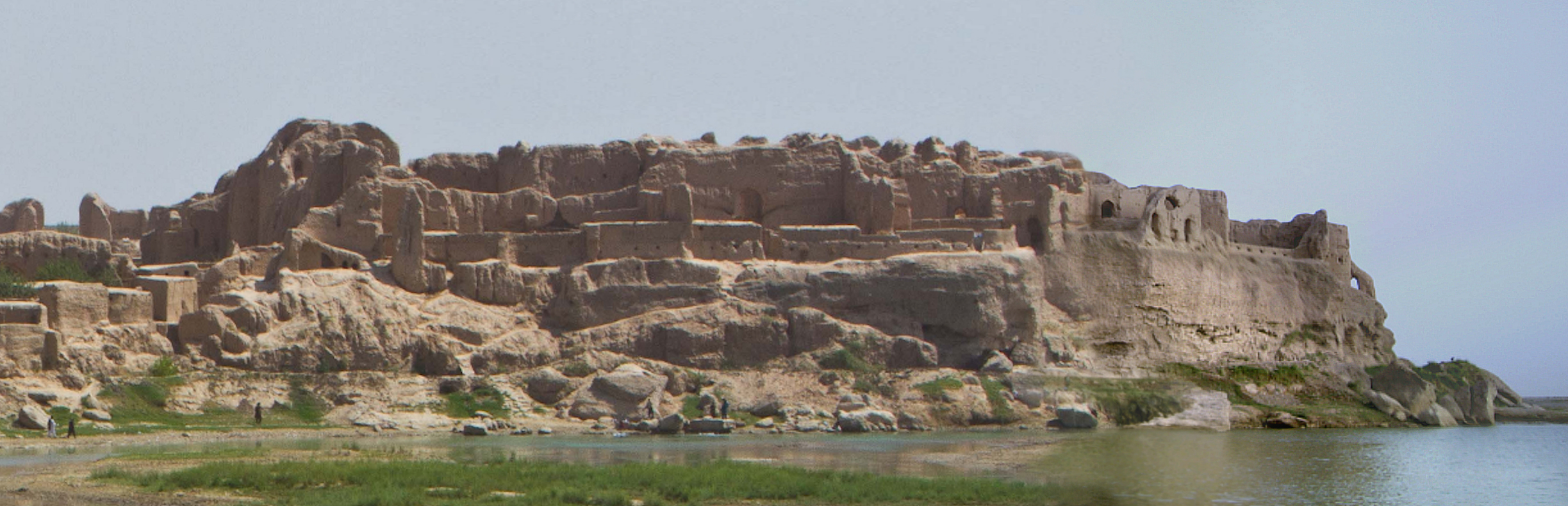
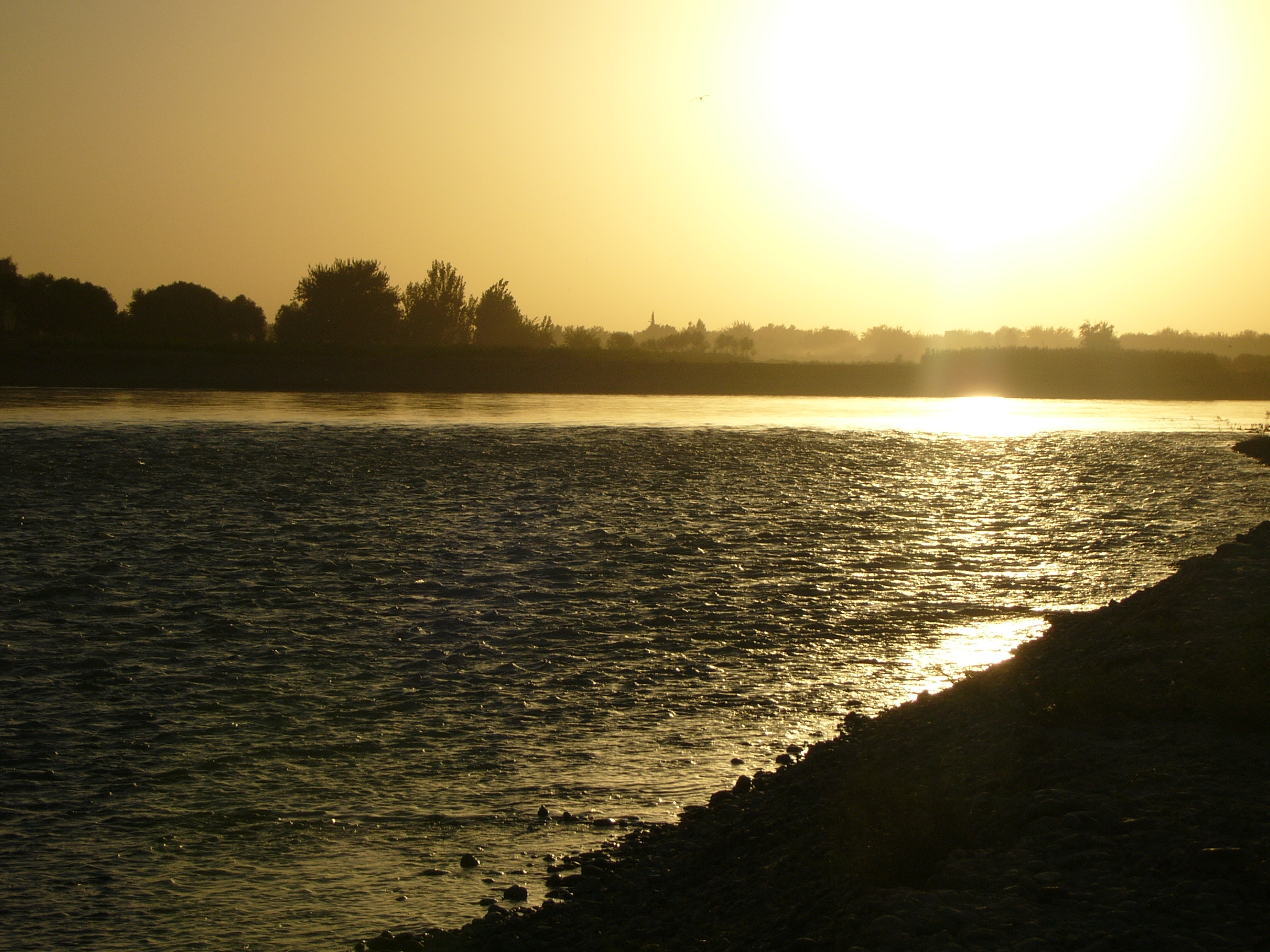
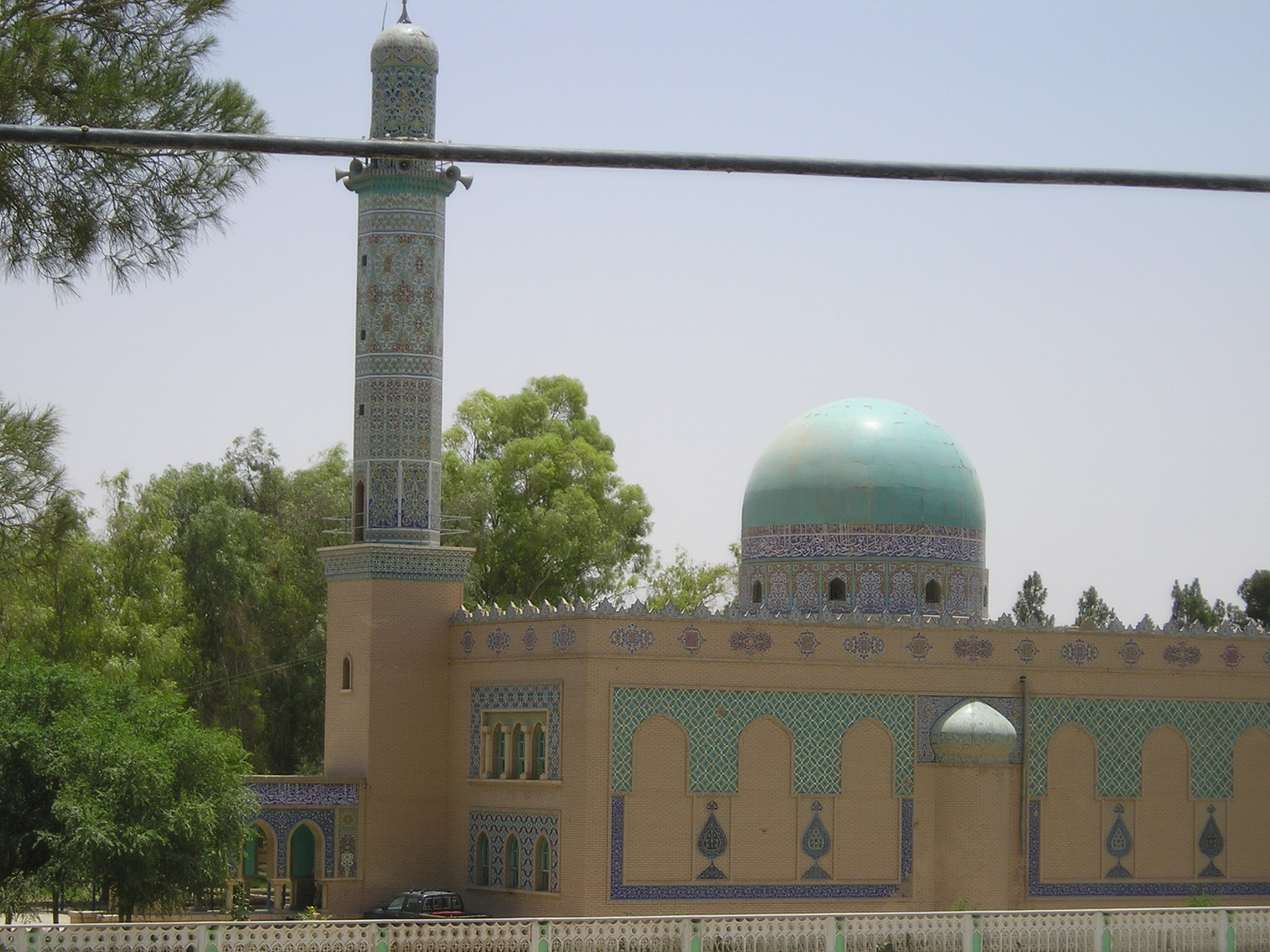
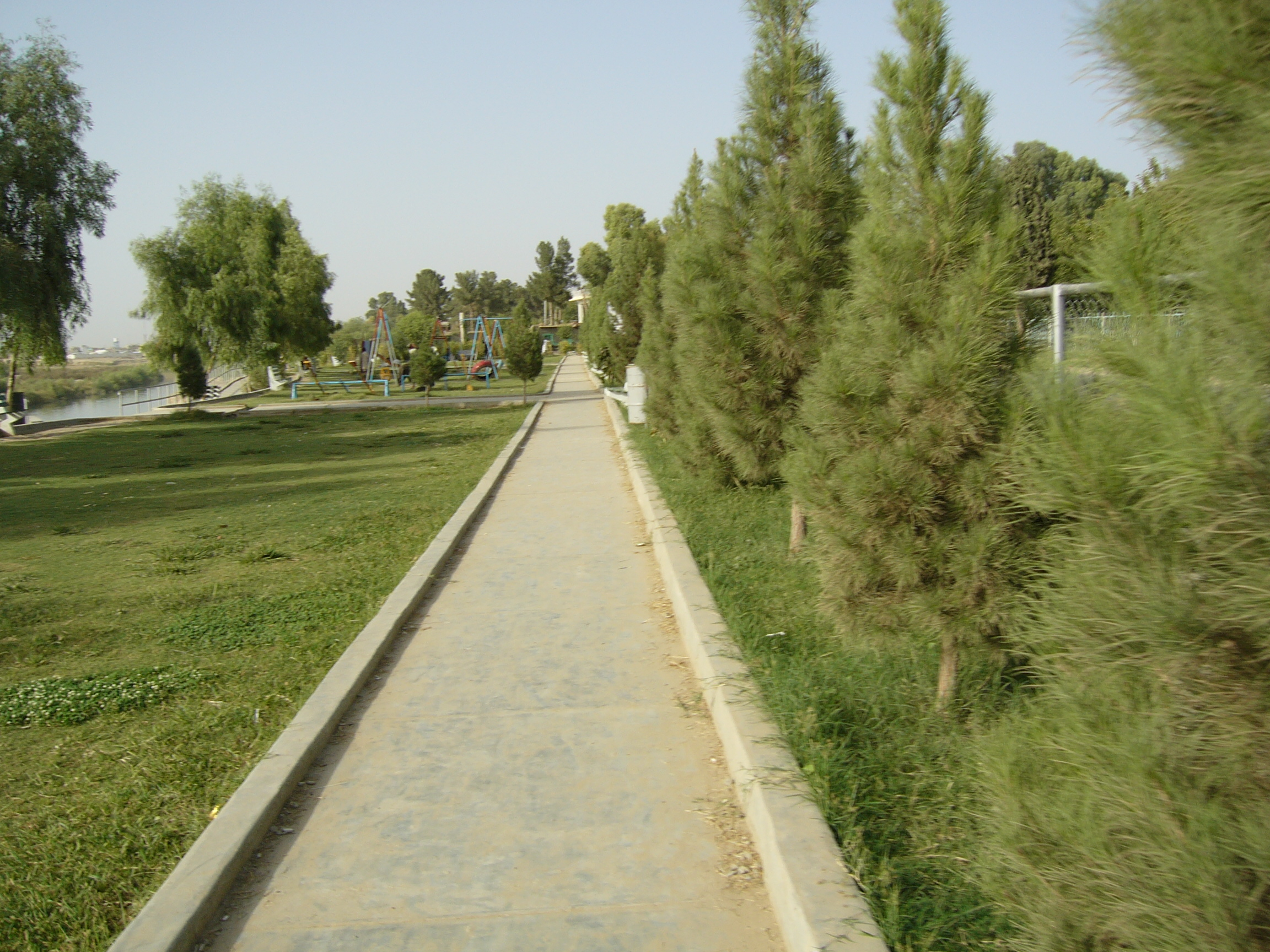
- From top, left to right: Ghaznavid fortress of Qala-e-Kohna; Sunset over the Helmand River; Lashkargah Mosque; Lashkargah streets; Mirwais Nika Park.

- Location in Afghanistan Lashkargah (West and Central Asia)
- Coordinates: 31°34′59″N 64°22′9″E
- Country: Afghanistan
- Province: Helmand
- District: Lashkargah

Government
  - Type: Municipality
  - Mayor: Hafiz Sadiq

Area
  - Land: 384 km^{2} (148 sq mi)
- Elevation: 773 m (2,536 ft)

Population (2025)
  - Provincial capital: 191,458
  - Density: 499/km^{2} (1,290/sq mi)
  - Urban: 100,523
  - Rural: 90,935
- Time zone: UTC+04:30 (Afghanistan Time)
- ISO 3166 code: AF-LKG
- Climate: BWh

Lashkargah, (Note: Pashto: لښکرگاه, romanized: Laṣ̌kargāh [laʂ.kar.ɡɑ, laʃ.kar.ɡɑ, laç.kar.ɡɑ, lax.kar.ɡɑ]; Dari: لشکرگاه, romanized: Laškargāh [läʃ.kʰáɾ.gɑ́ː, läʃ.kʰáɾ.gɑ́ːʱ]) historically known as Bost, is a city in the southern part of Afghanistan, serving as the capital of Helmand Province. It is within the jurisdiction of Lashkargah District and has an estimated population of 191,458 people. Hafiz Sadiq is the current mayor of the city. His predecessor was Mawlavi Abdullah Rohani.

Lashkargah is famous for its historical Lashkari Bazar and the Fort of Bost, which is over 3,500 years old. The city is home to Helmand University and Bost University. It has a number of bazaars, business centers, public parks, stadiums, banks, hotels, restaurants, mosques, hospitals, universities, and places to relax. Bost Airport is located in the southern part of the city.

Lashkargah is situated at an altitude of about 773 m (2,536 ft) above sea level, at a junction where the Arghandab River merges into the Helmand River. The city is connected by a road network with Sangin to the northeast, Kandahar to the east, Zaranj to the southwest, and Farah to the northwest.

== Etymology ==
Lashkargah means military place, from Persian words lashkar or lashgar (military) and gah (place). Historically, it served as a military town, especially during the time of the Ghaznavids, when it was their winter capital and strategic military base. Its name reflects this military role.

== History ==
Lashkargah has a long history, possibly dating back to the time of the ancient Achaemenid Empire. One of the oldest historical sites in the city is the Fort of Bost, which is believed to be over 3,500 years old.

The religion of Islam first arrived to Bost in or about 661 AD. Later the Saffarid dynasty of Zaranj made Islam the official religion. The Muslim traveler Ibn Hawqal visited the city in the 10th century and stated that its people were generous, polite, and with good manners. They wore similar clothing as the people of Iraq. Lashkargah rose up as a riverside military training town for Muslim soldiers accompanying the Ghaznavid nobility to their grand winter capital of Bost. The ruins of the Ghaznavid mansions still stand along the Helmand River. Following the Ghaznavids, the city was controlled by the Ghorids. It is said to have been destroyed by the Mongols in 1220 and then by the Timurids in 1383. However, it was later rebuilt by Timur.

By the late 16th century the city was claimed by the Safavid dynasty. It fell to the Hotak dynasty of Kandahar in 1709. It was then invaded by Nadir Shah and his Afsharid forces in 1738 on their way to Kandahar. By 1747 the city became part of the Durrani Empire (modern Afghanistan).

Lashkargah was used by Mohammad Ayub Khan as a lodging and recruiting place before proceeding to engage the powerful British at the July 1880 Battle of Maiwand in Kandahar Province. The city remained peaceful for the next 100 years.

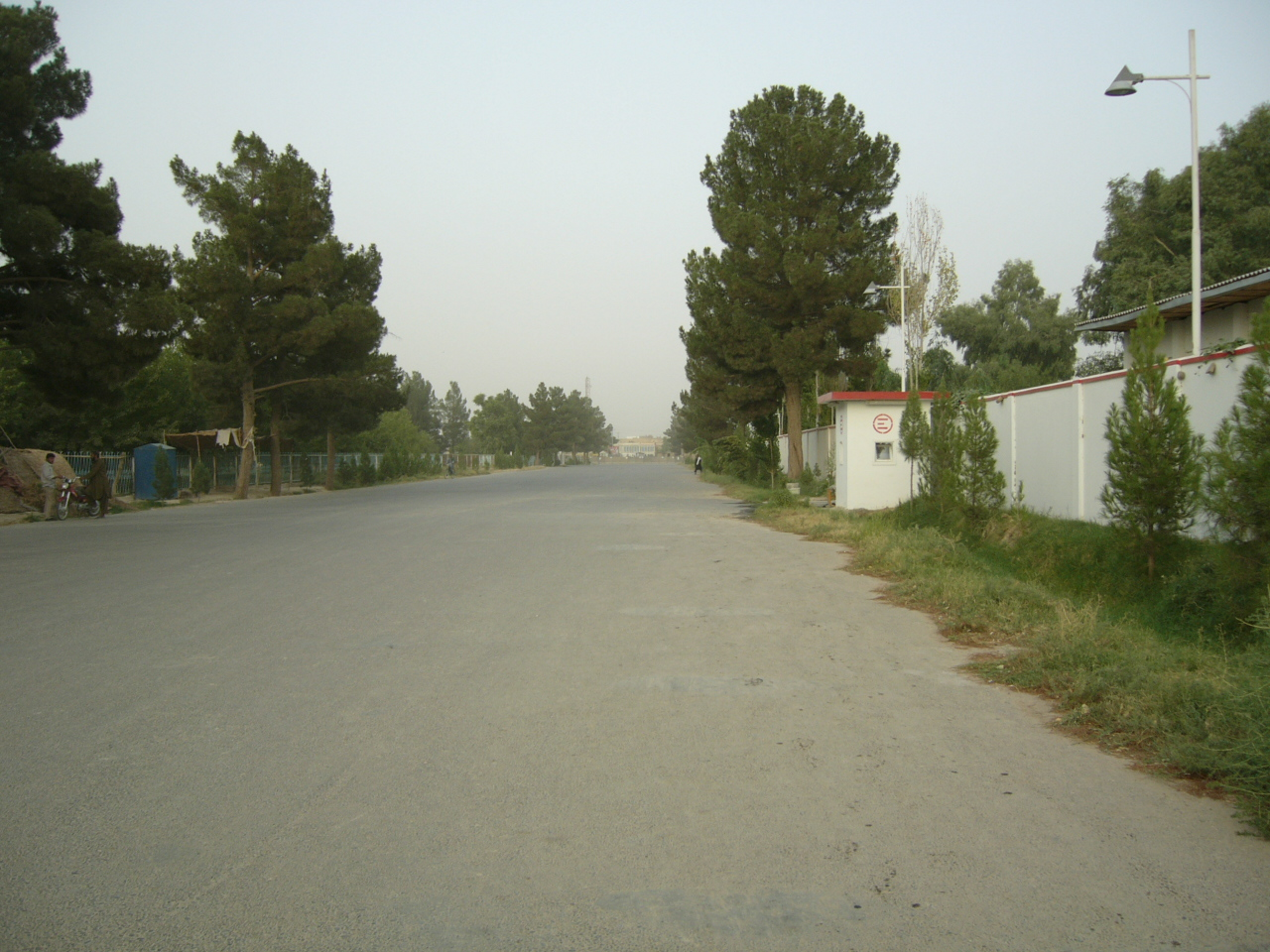
Street designed by Americans in the 1950s

From the 1940s to the aftermath of the 1978 Saur Revolution, Lashkargah served as one of the bases for Americans working on the Helmand Valley Authority irrigation project, modeled after the Tennessee Valley Authority in the United States. The city was rebuilt and expanded using American urban planning, with broad tree-lined streets and brick houses with no walls separating them from the street. In the wake of the Soviet invasion of 1979 and the long Afghan civil war, the trees mostly came down and walls went up.

The massive Helmand irrigation project created one of the most extensive farming zones in southern Afghanistan, opening up many thousands of hectares of desert to human cultivation and habitation. Citizens from many parts of the country began moving to the Lashkargah area for job opportunities and a better life. The project focused on three large canals: the Boghra, Shamalan, and Darweshan. Responsibility for maintaining the canals was given to the Helmand and Arghandab Valley Authority, a semi-independent government agency whose authority (in its heyday) rivaled that of the provincial governors.

Peace Square in 2009

After the withdrawal of Soviet forces from Afghanistan in 1989 and the collapse of Mohammad Najibullah's government in 1992, the city was taken over by the Afghan mujahideen. In the mid-1990s it peacefully surrendered to what became known as the Taliban forces of the Islamic Emirate of Afghanistan. In late 2001, the Taliban were removed from power and replaced by anti-Taliban forces of what became known as the Islamic Republic of Afghanistan. Since 2005, the city and region was occupied by United States Marine Corps and the International Security Assistance Force. In 2008, the Taliban attacked the city but the US-funded Afghan National Army and the Oregon Army National Guard managed to hold them back, as shown in the documentary, "Shepherds of Helmand." After training and equipping them, the foreign armies transferred security responsibility to the Afghan National Security Forces in 2011. In October 2020, the Taliban attacked the city along with nearby Nad Ali District. Militants raised the flag of the Islamic Emirate of Afghanistan at the city's eastern entrance but withdrew following a few days after the United States agreed to halt its airstrikes on the Taliban near Lashkargah.

After several weeks of fighting in the Battle of Lashkargah, the city was captured by the Taliban on 13 August 2021, becoming the fourteenth provincial capital to be seized as part of the wider 2021 Taliban offensive.

== Geography ==
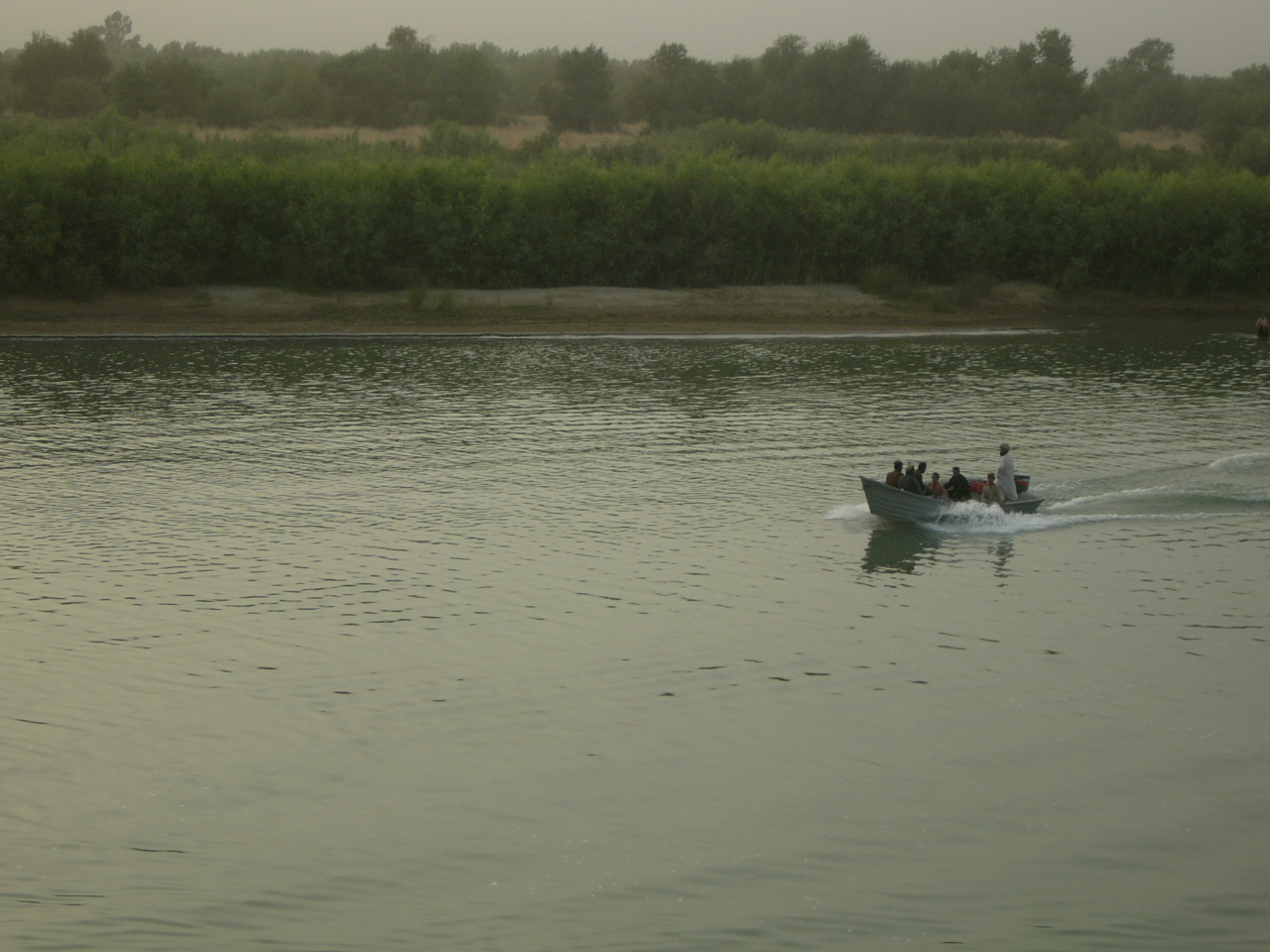
People riding a boat on the Helmand River

Lashkargah is a strategic city in the southern part of Afghanistan. It connects by a road network with Sangin to the northeast, Kandahar to the east, Zaranj to the southwest, and Farah to the northwest. It is at an elevation of 773 m (2,536 ft) above sea level, next to where the Arghandab River merges into the Helmand River. The city is administratively divided into 16 city districts (nahias), covering a land area of 384 km^{2} (148 sq mi) or (38,444 ha (95,000 acres)).

The Helmand River is the longest in Afghanistan with a length of 1,150 km (710 mi). The river originates in Koh-i-Baba (Baba Mountain) in Bamyan Province and ends in Hamun Lake, which is on the Afghanistan–Iran border. One of the two primary arms of the river crosses through Lashkargah, giving it the attractive air of a riverside city. It makes for a pleasant setting for people to picnic. The river is deep enough at Lashkargah to allow for varied water sports, including swimming and boating. Boats are available for rent to the public. Mirwais Neka Park was recently built on the banks of the river. There is a large thicket located on the opposite side of the river from the city. Many types of trees and different species of birds, mammals, and reptiles inhabit the thicket.

=== Climate ===
Lashkargah has a hot desert climate (Köppen BWh), characterised by little precipitation and high variation between summer and winter temperatures. The average temperature in Lashkargah is 20.1 °C (68.2 °F), while the annual precipitation averages 97 mm (3.8 in). Summers start in mid-May, last until late-September, and are extremely dry. July is the hottest month of the year with an average temperature of 32.8 °C (91.0 °F). The coldest month January has an average temperature of 7.6 °C (45.7 °F).

Climate data for Lashkargah (1960–1983)
Month	Jan	Feb	Mar	Apr	May	Jun	Jul	Aug	Sep	Oct	Nov	Dec	Year
Record high °C (°F)	29.0 (84.2)	30.4 (86.7)	34.2 (93.6)	40.0 (104.0)	45.3 (113.5)	46.7 (116.1)	46.9 (116.4)	46.2 (115.2)	41.8 (107.2)	38.8 (101.8)	32.3 (90.1)	27.2 (81.0)	46.9 (116.4)
Mean daily maximum °C (°F)	13.9 (57.0)	16.9 (62.4)	23.2 (73.8)	29.8 (85.6)	36.0 (96.8)	41.0 (105.8)	41.8 (107.2)	39.7 (103.5)	35.5 (95.9)	29.6 (85.3)	22.0 (71.6)	16.7 (62.1)	28.8 (83.8)
Daily mean °C (°F)	6.3 (43.3)	9.3 (48.7)	15.4 (59.7)	21.6 (70.9)	27.2 (81.0)	31.5 (88.7)	32.7 (90.9)	30.0 (86.0)	24.7 (76.5)	18.7 (65.7)	12.0 (53.6)	7.9 (46.2)	19.8 (67.6)
Mean daily minimum °C (°F)	0.6 (33.1)	3.0 (37.4)	8.2 (46.8)	13.5 (56.3)	17.4 (63.3)	21.2 (70.2)	23.4 (74.1)	20.3 (68.5)	14.3 (57.7)	9.0 (48.2)	3.6 (38.5)	0.9 (33.6)	11.3 (52.3)
Record low °C (°F)	−15.0 (5.0)	−8.6 (16.5)	−4.3 (24.3)	2.7 (36.9)	5.3 (41.5)	9.5 (49.1)	16.2 (61.2)	11.0 (51.8)	5.2 (41.4)	−9.0 (15.8)	−8.5 (16.7)	−11.8 (10.8)	−15.0 (5.0)
Average precipitation mm (inches)	26.2 (1.03)	27.5 (1.08)	29.2 (1.15)	8.4 (0.33)	2.5 (0.10)	0.0 (0.0)	0.3 (0.01)	0.1 (0.00)	0.0 (0.0)	2.0 (0.08)	3.9 (0.15)	14.9 (0.59)	115.0 (4.53)
Average rainy days	5	4	4	3	0	0	0	0	0	0	1	3	20
Average snowy days	0	0	0	0	0	0	0	0	0	0	0	0	0
Average relative humidity (%)	62	60	51	43	34	26	28	29	29	35	49	55	41
Mean monthly sunshine hours	200.5	194.5	236.9	267.6	335.5	348.2	336.8	313.3	322.7	283.4	253.7	208.9	3,302
Source: NOAA

== Demographics ==
Lashkargah has an estimated population of 191,458 people. In 2015 the estimate was given as 300,000 people, and there were 30,709 dwelling units in the city.

== Economy ==
The economy of Lashkargah is mainly based on agriculture, trade, transport, and tourism. For the first time the city will be connected by a railroad with Farah to the northwest and Kandahar to the east. Many residents of the city go to work in Kabul and other Afghan cities.

As it is located at the confluence of the Helmand and Arghandab rivers, it is blessed with the most hectares of water (4,940 ha (12,200 acres)) of any provincial capital in the country. Agriculture consequently accounts for the largest amount of land use (61%). Dwellings are clustered in the central districts. Recently the Ghazi Mohammad Ayub Khan Township was built on a 650 acres of land in the Sarkar neighborhood of Lashkargah. Named in honor of Mohammad Ayub Khan, victor of the 1880 Battle of Maiwand, it is one of the most modern residential areas in the city.

== Education ==
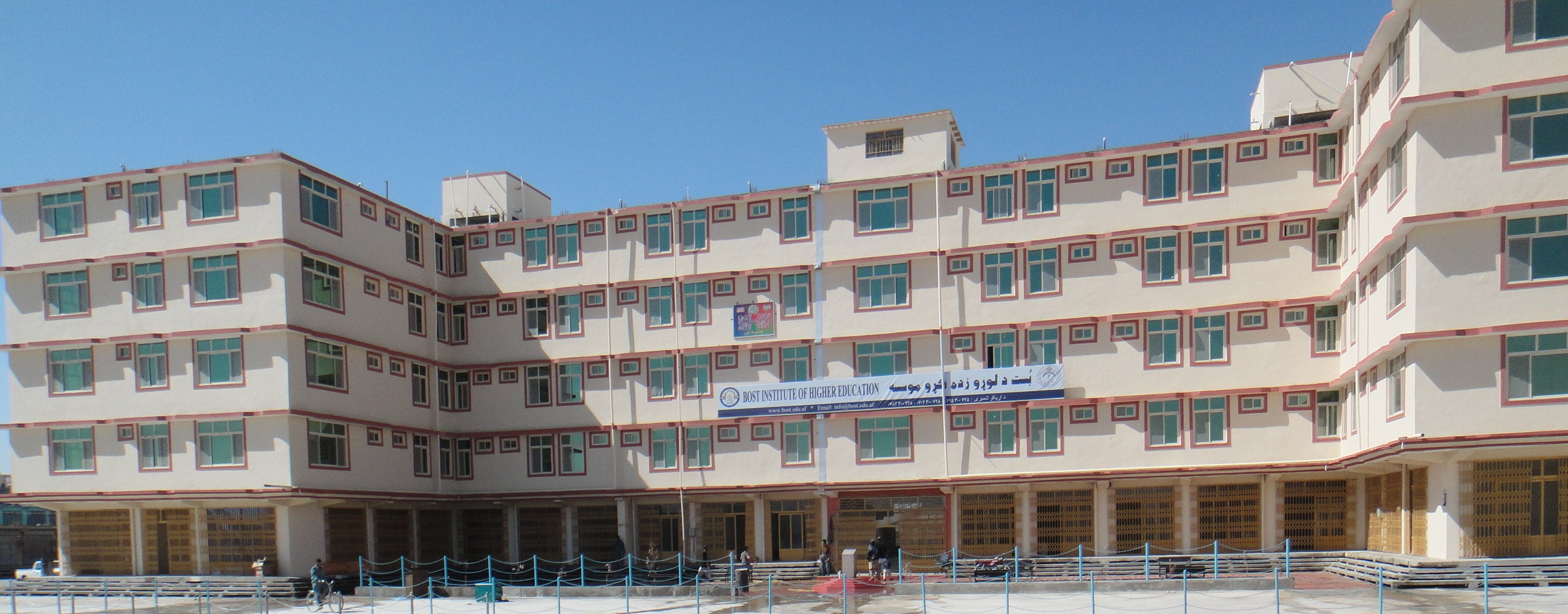
Bost University

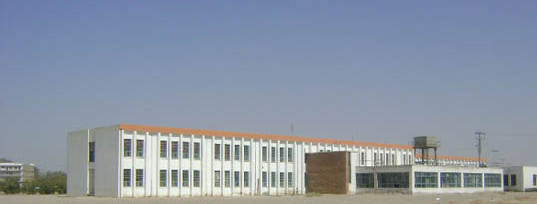
Helmand Institute of Teacher's Training

The level of education in Lashkargah had reached high before the Soviet invasion of 1979. Students were taking up good positions within the universities. The decades of war that followed prevented citizens of the country from obtaining formal education as most schools and universities were closed.

There are around 27 public schools and universities in the city. The Helmand University was established in 2006. Bost University was accredited by the Ministry of Higher Education in 2015. Another is the Wadi Helmand Higher Education Institution.

Besides the activities of the Department of Culture and Information of Helmand Province, the youths are also involved in different cultural and educational activities. There are different cultural groups operating in Lashkargah, including the Helmand Youth Organization, the Bost Cultural Society, the Allama Mahmud Tarzi Educational and Cultural Association, and the Helmand Cultural Group.

== Healthcare ==
There are a number of hospitals and clinics in Lashkargah.

== Sports ==
Cricket and football are the most popular sports in Lashkargah. The city has two major stadiums, one for cricket and the other for football tournaments. There are also several other smaller sports grounds in the city, including gymnasiums.

Other sports Lashkargah's people enjoy are futsal, volleyball, wrestling, taekwondo, and bodybuilding. Aziz Ahmad Nikyar gained the title of Mr. Afghanistan in 2006, and also participated in the 2006 Asian Games representing Afghanistan.

== Places of interest ==
The Lashkari Bazar, which contains a fortress built by the Ghaznavids, is located on the outskirts of the city. To the south, the great Fort of Bost remains an impressive ruin. It is located near the convergence of the Helmand and Arghandab rivers, a half-hour's drive south of Lashkargah. The Fort of Bost is famous for its decorative arch, which appears on the 100 afghani note (Afghan currency). As of April 2008, it was possible to descend into an ancient shaft about 20 feet across and 200 feet deep, with a series of dark side rooms and a spiral staircase leading to the bottom. In 2006 construction began on a cobblestone road to lead from the south of Lashkargah to the Fort of Bost.

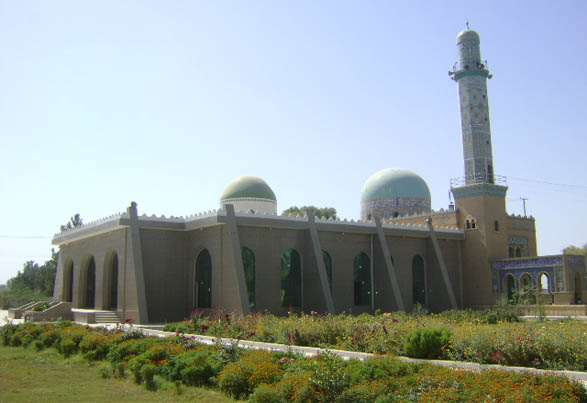
The Lashkargah Mosque is one of the largest mosques in the city

- Mosques
  - Abu Bakr Sadiq Mosque
  - Al Aqsa Mosque
  - Al Madina Mosque
  - Lashkargah Mosque
- Parks and Gardens
  - Baba-e-Millat Park covers an area of seven hectares. It is located on the bank of the Helmand River, on the outskirts of Lashkargah.
  - Ghazi Mohammad Ayub Khan Park is in the Sarkar area
  - Mirwais Nika Park is located on the bank of the Helmand River
  - Mohammadd Rasul Akhondzada Park is located in center of the city

== Notable people ==
- Tamim Ansary, author
- Abu al-Fath al-Busti, Persian secretary and famous poet
- Muhammad ibn Hibban al-Busti, Islamic scholar
- Ehsan Aman, Afghan musician
- Hasan Maymandi, 10th century governor of Bost under Ghaznavid ruler Sabuktigin

== See also ==
- List of cities in Afghanistan
