= Bost University =

Afghan university in Helmand province

- د بوسټن پوهنتون / بُست پوهنتون
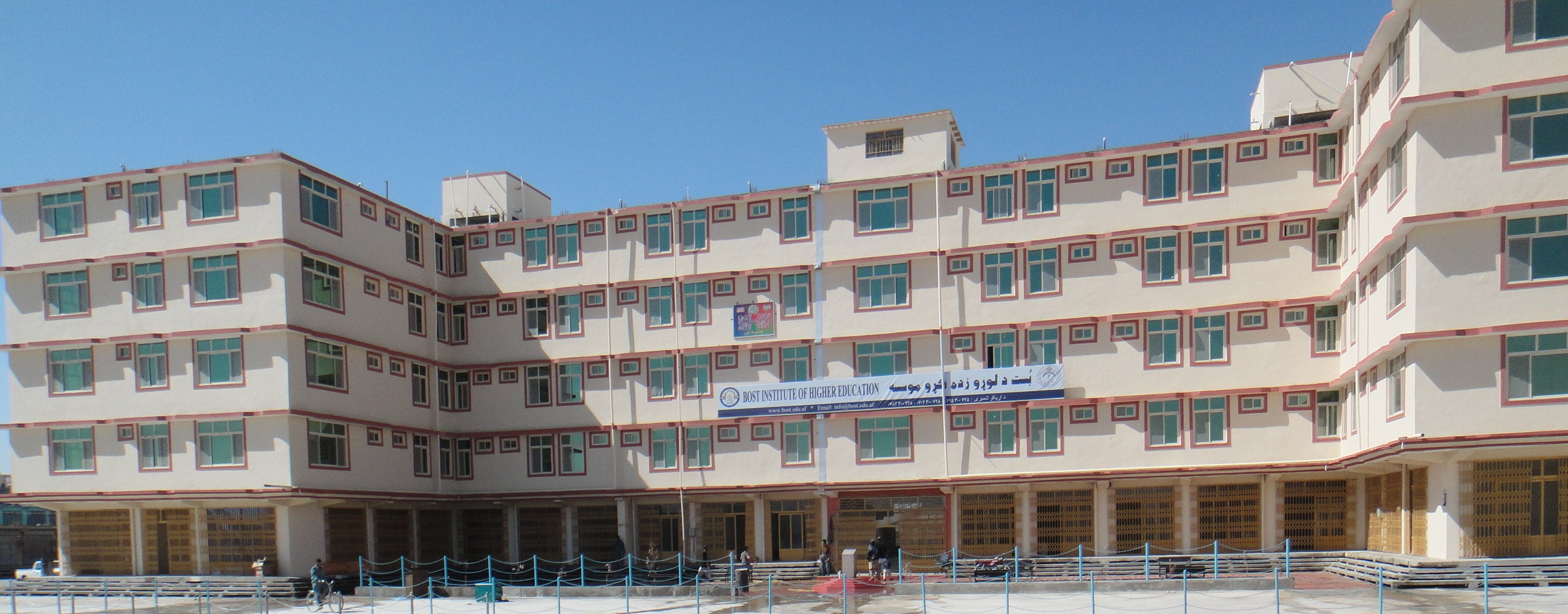
- Bost University, Helmand
- Motto: Quality is our priority
- Type: Private
- Established: 2012
- Founder: Ahmad Jan Popal
- Affiliations: Bost Foundation
- President: Mahmood Sangin
- Vice-Chancellor: Abdul Ghani Rashidzooi
- Location: Lashkar Gah, Helmand, Afghanistan; 31°51′24″N 064°13′15″E
- Campus: Lashkar Gah
- Colors: Black, red, and green
- Website: www.bost.edu.af

Bost University (Note: Pashto: د بوسټن پوهنتون Dari: پوهنتون بوست) is a university in Lashkargah, Helmand Province, Afghanistan. It is a private institution of higher education founded by Ahmad Jan Popal in 2010. Bost University offers two-year to six-year undergraduate degrees and diplomas. Four to six-year undergraduate programs include engineering, law and political science, economics, medicine, computer science, and education.

Certificates for short-term courses and training that are three years or less are part of the university's Institute of Health Science such as midwife, nursing, laboratory, physiotherapy, dentistry and pharmacy.

== History ==
From the beginning, it was called the Bost Institute of Higher Education. In 2013 the Ministry of Higher Education Quality Commission Board investigated all the private universities in the country. In 2015 the board announced its results and Bost Institute of Higher Education got the top marks (88.3) and was announced the top university of all private universities in Afghanistan.

The Ministry of Higher Education promoted the university to Bost University (بُست پوهنتون) awarded in November 2015.

== Faculties and departments ==
- Faculty of Law and Political Science
  - Law
  - Management (Political Science)
- Bachelor of Business Administration
  - Management
- Faculty of Engineering
  - Architecture
  - Civil
  - Mechanical
  - Electrical Engineering
- Faculty of Medicine, six-year program in General Medicine
- Faculty of Computer Science
  - Software
  - Hardware
  - Networking & Database
- Faculty of Education
  - Physic
  - Chemistry
  - Math
  - Biology
  - Pashto

== Institute of Health Science ==
- Nursing (NRS): a three-year program
- Midwife (MW): two-year program
- Laboratory (LAB): two-year program
- Pharmacy (PHR): two-year program
- Physiotherapy (PTR): two-year program
- Dentistry (DNT): two-year program

== Library ==
The library has more than 8,000 Pashto, Dari, and English books.

== Laboratory ==
The university has a laboratory for its engineering faculty students.

== See also ==
- List of universities in Afghanistan
