= Fletcher and Jenks =

2016 film by Tony Olmos

- Poster
- Directed by: Tony Olmos
- Written by: Jordan Jacobo
- Produced by: Ryan Binse; Tony Gorodeckas; George Jac; Allie Lennox; Kelly Potts
- Starring: George Jac; Kayla Schaffroth; Luke Pensabene; Kelly Potts
- Cinematography: Luke Pensabene
- Edited by: Anais Bernard
- Music by: Steve Garbade
- Production companies: Film Consortium San Diego; Satiated Sadists
- Release date: September 8, 2016 (48 Hour Film Project)
- Country: United States
- Language: English

Fletcher and Jenks is a 2016 American dark comedy short film directed by Tony Olmos, written by Jordan Jacobo, and starring George Jac and Kayla Schaffroth. The film was made as part of the 48 Hour Film Project in 2016 and Schaffroth won Best Actress at the GI Film Festival San Diego in 2017.

== Cast ==
- George Jac as Fletcher
- Kayla Schaffroth as Jenks
- Luke Pensabene as Luke
- Kelly Potts as Chief
- Tony Gorodeckas as Herman Hill
- Mark Atkinson as Detective
- Jordan Jacobo as Detective
- Brian Patrick Butler as Ives
- Sasha Doppelt as Detective
- Ron Perkins as Detective
- Ryan Binse as S.W.A.T.
- Justin Lea as Detective
- Adam Eron Welch as Detective
- Rachel Gallenberger as Detective
- Kalli Cavitt as Detective

== Production ==
Ryan Binse produced the film with George Jac, who also performed as the lead actor. Luke Pensabene was the cinematographer and also acted in the film with Kayla Schaffroth. Jodi Cilley was the executive producer.

== Release ==
The film premiered in 2016 as part of the 48 Hour Film Project in San Diego.

== Reception ==
Festival	Year	Award	Recipient(s)	Result	Ref.
48 Hour Film Project	2016	Best Actor	George Jac	Nominated	
48 Hour Film Project	2016	Best Writing	Jordan Jacobo	Nominated	
48 Hour Film Project	2016	Best Film	Fletcher and Jenks	Nominated	
GI Film Festival San Diego	2017	Best Narrative Short	Tony Olmos	Nominated	
GI Film Festival San Diego	2017	Local Choice Award	Tony Olmos	Nominated	
GI Film Festival San Diego	2017	Best Film Made by a Veteran or Service Member	Ryan Binse, Luke Pensabene	Nominated	
GI Film Festival San Diego	2017	Best Actor	George Jac	Nominated	
GI Film Festival San Diego	2017	Best Actor	Luke Pensabene	Nominated	
GI Film Festival San Diego	2017	Best Actress	Kayla Schaffroth	Won	
