= Speed & Angels =

2008 documentary film by Peyton Wilson

- Directed by: Peyton Wilson
- Produced by: Velvy Appleton; Francesco "Paco" Chierici; Michelle Hansen; Peyton Wilson
- Starring: Jay "Faceshot" Consalvi; Meagan "Slick" Varley
- Cinematography: Norman Bonney
- Edited by: Jessica Congdon
- Music by: Eric Holland
- Production company: Spellbound Productions
- Release date: 2008
- Running time: 95 minutes
- Budget: $1.5 million

Speed & Angels is a 2008 independent documentary film following the journey of two United States Navy pilots through air combat training and deployment in the Iraq War flying the F-14 Tomcat during the last years of its service.

== Production ==
Director Peyton Wilson and producer Paco Chierici found inspiration from the surfing documentary Step into Liquid and from Paco's background in the Navy's VFC-13 Fighting Saints adversary squadron. Paco wanted to create a film that tells the story of naval aviation from a realistic and dramatic point of view. The project turned into a documentary, and filming started in 2003 lasting four years.

The filmmakers initially focused on the Fighting Saints, the squadron that teaches dogfighting, but shifted to students Jay Consalvi and Meagan Varley, who were 2002 graduates of the Naval Academy, because their stories represented a more compelling story arc. Initially Varley and Wilson avoided each other because Wilson was not seeking a token woman for her film. She wanted to tell a good story, and was drawn towards Varley for her honesty.

The filmmakers raised money from friends and family to make a showreel called "Last of the Dogfighters". They used this footage to entice the Navy into the project and to raise additional funds. The budget for Speed & Angels was $1.5 million, most of which went towards fuel for the planes when not on scheduled training flights. Rates were $14,500 per hour for the F-14 and $3k per hour for the F-5.

Speed & Angels was filmed with Navy's cooperation, being the first independent film approved by the Navy. Paco received permission from the Navy Vice Admiral James M. Zortman for aerial filming in San Diego in 2006. The last flight of the F-14 occurred in September that year.

Reenactments of dogfights were filmed with real planes with the intention of being more realistic than Top Gun. Aerial footage of F-5 jets took place in near Naval Air Station Fallon.

Wilson shot 80% of the film herself with handheld cameras. The crew mounted cameras in cockpits for in-plane shots and mounted on the nose and belly of a Learjet for aerial shots. The team captured 450 hours of footage in total.

== Release ==
The film screened theatrically in Washington, San Diego, and Los Angeles in November 2006. It was shown at the Estrella Warbird Museum in Paso Robles, California in February 2007 and was featured in various film festivals.

It aired on Discovery Channel and is available for streaming online. Speed & Angels released on DVD and Blu-Ray on September 16, 2008.

== Reception ==
Speed & Angels was well-received both by critics and audiences military and non-military. Speed & Angels won Audience Choice Award Documentary in the 2008 San Diego Film Festival and Best Documentary and Best in Fest at the San Luis Obispo Film Festival. Bradley Olson of The Baltimore Sun stated that the aerial footage "is reminiscent of the 1986 movie Top Gun, except that it is real". John Clement of SimHQ praised the cinematography of the cockpit and aerial shots and felt that the storytelling "humanizes the experience" of becoming aviators. He recommended the film to fans of the shows American Fighter Pilot, Dogfights, and Wings. Writing for Blu-ray.com, Dustin Somner assessed that Wilson created a "well-balanced documentary, with a nice blend of stunning aerial photography, and dialogue-driven moments with Jay or Meagan".
