= GI Film Festival =

US festival focused on military experiences

- Location: San Diego, California, US
- Established: 2007
- Website: www.gifilmfestival.com

The GI Film Festival is an annual film festival focused on military and veteran experiences, held in San Diego, California. Films featured in the festival reveal the struggles, triumphs, and experiences of service members and veterans.

The festival was held in Washington, D.C. from 2008 to 2018. Since 2018, it has been held in San Diego. The next festival will take place May 7-9, 2025, at the Museum of Photographic Arts in Balboa Park.

== History ==
The inaugural event was held in 2008 over Memorial Day weekend at the Ronald Reagan Building and International Trade Center. The inaugural GI Film Festival San Diego event was held in October 2015 with the British film Kilo Two Bravo as the opening night film.

== Venues ==
Venues in the Washington, D.C. have included the Embassy of Canada, Angelika Film Center at Mosaic, Cannon House Office Building, Howard Theater, Carnegie Institution for Science and the US Navy Memorial Theater, among others. Venues in San Diego have included the USS Midway Museum, Balboa Theatre, Village Theaters in Coronado, UltraStar Cinemas and DoubleTree hotel in Mission Valley, as well as the Museum of Photographic Arts in Balboa Park.

== Notable events ==
=== 2007 ===
- General (Ret.) Richard Myers, former Chairman of the Joint Chiefs of Staff, hosted a special screening of Forrest Gump.
- Actor Gary Sinise received the G.I. Spirit Award.

=== 2008 ===
- Film screenings were presented by Hollywood actors and directors Gary Sinise, Jon Voight, Robert Duvall, James Franco and others.
- A congressional reception honoring members of Congress who served in the military.
- Vince and Linda McMahon received the "Corporate Patriot Award" for their philanthropic work on behalf of the American Armed Forces.
- An "Armed Forces Action Fest" featured World Wrestling Entertainment (WWE) stars and Buck Rogers star Gil Gerard.
- Panel discussions included "The 100 Greatest War Films of All-Time"; "War Stories", featuring Medal of Honor recipients; and "The Portrayal of GIs in Film and the Media".

=== 2009 ===
- Valkyrie - opening night film
- Notable attendees: US Senator John McCain, Kelsey Grammer, Fred Thompson and Robert Duvall.

=== 2010 ===
- Notable appearances: Glenn Close, Bob Woodruff and the band Drowning Pool.

=== 2011 ===
- Ironclad - opening night film (Q&A with producer Rick Benattar, and director Jonathan English).
- Notable attendees: Gary Sinise, Lou Diamond Phillips (GI Spirit Award), and William Devane (GI Choice Awards),

=== 2012 ===
- Notable appearances: Ross Perot, Pat Sajak, Joe Mantegna (GI Spirit Award), Sally Pressman and Brian McNamara (GI Family Award).

=== 2016 ===
- Official Selections: The Finest Hours, Return to Dak To, The Last Man Club
- Featured guests: Gary Sinise, Stephen Lang, J.W. Cortes, Dominic Fumusa.
- Special Screenings: Top Gun, X-Men: Apocalypse.

=== 2017 ===
- Notable attendees in DC: Judd Nelson
- On May 17, filmmakers Ken Burns and Lynn Novick presented over an hour of preview footage from his latest PBS series The Vietnam War at San Diego's Balboa Theatre. In attendance were several guests who were interview subjects in the film.
- On October 18, the west coast opening night film was The 2 Sides Project.

=== 2018 ===
- Notable attendees in SD: George Takei, Jeffrey Wright

=== 2019 ===
- Family Movie Night on the USS Midway

== Award winners ==
=== 2007 ===
- Feature Narrative: Divergence – (dir. Patrick Donnelly).
- Documentary Short: Shakey's Hill (dir. Norman Lloyd).
- Best Short Feature: Old Glory – (dir. James McEachin).
- Feature Documentary: Speed & Angels – (dir. Peyton Wilson)
- Founder's Choice: Patriot Act – (dir. Jeff Ross).
- GI Spirit Award: Gary Sinise

=== 2008 ===
- Feature Narrative: Soldier's Heart – Anthony Lover (Executive Producer).
- Documentary Short: Spitfire 944 – (dir. William Lorton).
- Narrative Short: God and Country – (dir. Daniel Piatt).
- Feature Documentary Winner: Brothers at War – (dir. Jake Rademacher)
- Family Film: The Flyboys – (dir. Rocco DeVilliers)
- Founder's Choice: The Last 600 Meters – (dir. Michael Pack).
- American Pride Film: SWIM – by Chantz Hoover.

=== 2009 ===
- Feature Documentary - Perfect Valor
- Feature Documentary Runner-Up - Bedford: The Town They Left Behind
- Best Narrative Feature - Everyman's War
- Founder's Choice Award - The Triangle of Death
- Best Documentary Short - A Touch of Home
- Best Narrative Short - Witt's Daughter
- Best Student Film - Kapisa
- Best First Time Filmmaker - The Inheritance of War
- Best Military Family Film - Lioness
- Best Short Film - Looking Back

=== 2011 ===
- Military Channel Award - Shepherds of Helmand, directed by Gary Mortensen
- Best International Film - The Telegram Man (Australia), by James Francis Khehtie
- Best Student Film - Thule, by Robert Scott Wildes
- Best Narrative Short - A Marine’s Guide to Fishing, by Nicholas Brennan
- Best Documentary Short - Last to Leave, by Pat Clark
- Best Narrative Feature - Flag of My Father, by Rodney Ray
- Best Documentary Feature - Patrol Base Jaker, by David Scantling
- Founder's Choice Award - The Wereth Eleven, by Robert Child

=== 2012 ===
- Best Documentary Feature - Lost Airmen of Buchenwald (dir. Mike Dorsey)
- Best Documentary Short - Survive. Recover. Live (dir. Ivan Kander)
- Best International Film - Bridges: A Living Graphic Novel (dir. Miguel Pate)
- Best Narrative Feature - Memorial Day (dir. Sam Fischer)
- Best Narrative Short - 8:46 (dir. Jennifer Gargano)
- Best Short Short - The Jockstrap Raiders (dir. Mark Nelson)
- Best Student Film - Stateside (dir. Jacob J. Tanenbaum)
- Founder's Choice Award - (dir. Stephanie Argy and Alec Boehm)
- The Military Channel Award - The Borinqueneers (dir. Noemi Figueroa Soulet)

=== 2013 ===
- Best Short Short - Fallout, (dir. Peter Carruthers)
- Best Student Film - Choice, (dir. Michael Chan)
- Best International Film - Gefallen, (dir. Christoph Schuler)
- Best Narrative Short - The Fifth Horseman, (dir. Kari Barber (VFX Reel)
- Best Documentary Short - The Real Inglorious Bastards, (dir. Min Sook Lee)
- Best Documentary Feature - Honor Flight, (dir. Dan Hayes)
- Founder's Choice - 16 Photographs at Ohrdruf, (dir. Matthew Nash)

=== 2014 ===
- Best Short Short - The Knee Deep Sailor (dir. Tyler Elliot)
- Best Student Film - Kingdom Coming (dir. Alex Fofonoff)
- Best International Film - Last Call (dir. Camille Delamarre)
- Best Dramatic Feature - Field of Lost Shoes (dir. Sean McNamara)
- Best Narrative Feature - Fort Bliss (dir. Claudia Myers)
- Best Narrative Short - Present Trauma (dir. Mark D. Manalo)
- Best Documentary Short - Travis: A Soldier’s Story (dir. Jonathon Link)
- Best Documentary Feature - Rickover (dir. Michael Pack)
- Founder's Choice - Riding My Way Back (dir. Robin Fryday and Peter Rosenbaum)
- American Heroes Channel Award - Forgotten Flag Raisers (dir. Dustin Spence)
- Best Original Screenplay - Christmas Leave written by David Brock
- Best Music Video - Nothing Real (dir. Reed Simonsen)

=== 2015 ===
- Veteran Filmmaker Award (Short) - Day One (dir. Henry Hughes)
- Veteran Filmmaker Award (Feature) - Haebangchon (dir. James William III)
- Best Student Film - Drone (dir. Justin S. Lee)
- Best International Film - Who’s Afraid of the Big Black Wolf (dir. Janez Lapajne)
- Best Short-Short - Beautiful Sunset (dir. Karen Weza)
- Best Documentary Short - The Next Part and Climb (dir. Erin Sanger and Ivan Kander)
- Best Narrative Short - Birthday (dir. Chris King)
- Best Documentary Feature - The Millionaire’s Unit (dir. Darroch Greer and Ron King)
- Best Action Feature - War Pigs (dir. Ryan Little)
- Best Narrative Feature - Kajaki (dir. Paul Katis)
- American Heroes Channel Award Winner - The MIAs on Tiger Mountain (dir. Norman Lloyd)
- Best Screenplay - Text Messages to God written by David Bryant Perkins)
- Founder's Choice Award - Nomadic Veterans and Battle Scars (dir. Matthew R Sanders and Danny Buday)

=== 2019 ===
San Diego:

- Best Actor: Frankie Muniz (The Black String)
- Best Actress: Scottie Thompson (#3 Normandy Lane)
- Best Narrative Short: #3 Normandy Lane (dir. Brenda Strong)
- Best Documentary Feature: The Donut Dollies (dir. Norm Anderson)
- Best Documentary Short: Remains (dir. Joe Day and Jose Rodriguez)
- Best Student Film: A Rodeo Film (dir. Darius Dawson)
- Best First Time Filmmaker: Brenda Strong (#3 Normandy Lane)
- Best International Film: Entrenched (dir. Joseph Chebatte)
- Best Film Made By or Starring Veterans or Military: War Paint (dir. J.C. Doler and Taylor Bracewell)
- Founder's Choice Award: Homemade (dir. Jason Maris and Danielle Bernstein)

=== 2022 ===
San Diego:

Museum of Photographic Arts

- Best Documentary Short: Veterans Journey Home: On Black Mountain (dir. Frederick Marx)
- Best Narrative Short: American Hero (dir. Manny McCord)
- Best Local Narrative Short: My Happy Place (dir. Devin Scott)
- Best Student Film: BRAKE (dir. Aja Weary and Amanda Richardson)
- Best Actor: Evan Hall, Shell Shocked (dir. Paula Cajiao)
- Best Actress: Jomarla Melancon, Blood and Glory (dir. Satinder Kaur)
- Best Narrative Directed by Military or Veterans: THAT NIGHT (dir. Samuel Gonzalez Jr.)
- Best Narrative Starring Military or Veterans: Landing Home (dir. Douglas Taurel)
- Best Documentary Made by Military or Veterans: Walk With Frank
- Best Documentary Feature: Dear Sirs - (dir. by Mark Pedri)
- Local Choice Award: We All Die Alone (dir. Jonathan Hammond)
- Founders’ Choice Award: HERE. IS. BETTER. (dir. Jack Youngelson)
- Best First-Time Director: Ryan Mayers and Matt Mayers, Walk With Frank
