= List of films shot in San Diego =

A list of films shot in San Diego and the surrounding areas within San Diego County. Organized alphabetically in separate sortable tables for features and short films.

== Feature films ==
Title	Year	Location(s)	Ref.
1 Night in San Diego	2020		
8 Seconds	1994	San Diego	
16-Love	2012	La Costa Resort and Spa	
Above the Tin	2018	San Diego	
Adalynn	2023	San Diego	
Almighty Zeus	2022	San Diego	
Almost Famous	2000	Balboa Park	
Almost Famous	2000	Ocean Beach	
Almost Famous	2000	USD High School	
Almost Heroes	1998	Black's Beach	
American Sniper	2014	El Centro	
American Sniper	2014	Malibu	
American Sniper	2014	Venice	
Anchorman: The Legend of Ron Burgundy	2004	Downtown San Diego	
Anchorman 2: The Legend Continues	2013	Balboa Park	
Anchorman 2: The Legend Continues	2013	San Diego Zoo	
Anchorman 2: The Legend Continues	2013	San Diego Waterfront	
Anchorman 2: The Legend Continues	2013	SeaWorld San Diego	
Antwone Fisher	2001	Coronado	
Antwone Fisher	2001	Point Loma	
Attack of the Killer Tomatoes	1978	Oceanside	
Attack of the Killer Tomatoes	1978	San Diego County	
Attack of the Killer Tomatoes	1978	San Diego Harbor	
Attack of the Killer Tomatoes	1978	University of California, San Diego	
Attack of the Killer Tomatoes: Organic Intelligence	2026	Chula Vista	
Attack of the Killer Tomatoes: Organic Intelligence	2026	East County	
Attack of the Killer Tomatoes: Organic Intelligence	2026	Mission Bay	
Attack of the Killer Tomatoes: Organic Intelligence	2026	USS Midway	
Attack of the Killer Tomatoes: Organic Intelligence	2026	USS Midway Museum	
Babel	2006	San Ysidro	
Bang Bang	2011	San Diego	
Battle Cry	1955		
Battle: Los Angeles	2011		
Beneath the Leaves	2019	Julian	
Beyond the Rocks	1922	Hotel del Coronado	
The Big Mouth	1967	SeaWorld San Diego	
Blame it on the Night	1984	San Diego	
Blast	2004	San Diego	
Bloody Wednesday	1988		
Borderline	1980	San Diego	
The Boys in Company C	1978		
Bring It On	2000	The Academy of Our Lady of Peace	
Bring It On	2000	Alliant International University	
Bring It On	2000	Eastlake High School	
Bring It On	2000	Humphreys Half Moon Inn	
Bring It On	2000	Kearny High School	
Bring It On	2000	The Marlin Club	
Bring It On	2000	Oceanside Municipal Fishing Pier	
Bring It On	2000	San Diego State University	
Bruce Almighty	2003	Harbor Island	
The Buildout	2024	Anza-Borrego Desert State Park	
Cannery Row	1982	San Diego	
Carbon	2019	Coronado	
Carving a Life	2017	Encinitas	
Carving a Life	2017	Julian	
The Cell	2000	La Jolla	
The Cell	2000	The Neurosciences Institute	
Chubasco	1968	San Diego	
Citizen Kane	1941	Balboa Park	
The Coast of Folly	1925	Hotel del Coronado	
The Condor	2007		
Continuance	2021	San Diego	
Continuance	2021	Ramona	
Coronado	1935	Hotel del Coronado	
Dangerous Curves	1988	San Diego	
A Day Without a Mexican	2003	San Diego	
Daydream Hotel	2017	Hotel del Coronado	
Demolition Man	1993	Downtown San Diego	
Demolition Man	1993	Downtown Los Angeles	
Demon Protocol	2018	San Diego	
The Devil and Max Devlin	1981	San Diego	
Devil Dogs of the Air	1935	Naval Air Station North Island	
Dive Bomber	1941	Naval Air Station North Island	
Down in San Diego	1941	San Diego	
Driven	2018		
El camino de San Diego	2006		
Emanuelle and the White Slave Trade	1978		
The Endless	2017	Descanso	
Eternity: The Movie	2014	San Diego	
Everybody Dies by the End	2022	C Street Inn	
Everybody Dies by the End	2022	Jamul	
Everybody Dies by the End	2022	San Carlos	
The Evil Rises	2018	San Diego	
Firefox	1982	San Diego	
Flight Command	1940	Naval Air Station North Island	
Flight of the Intruder	1990	San Diego	
The Flying Fleet	1929	Hotel del Coronado	
The Flying Fleet	1929	Naval Air Station North Island	
A Force of One	1979	San Diego Harbor	
Francis in the Navy	1955	Naval Amphibious Base Coronado	
Freaky Friday	1976	Mission Bay	
Friend of the World	2020	C Street Inn	
Friend of the World	2020	Mission Trails Regional Park	
Friend of the World	2020	Point Loma	
Friend of the World	2020	Sunset Cliffs	
Friend of the World	2020	Tierrasanta	
Friend of the World	2020	San Diego	
Frost: Portrait of a Vampire	2002	San Diego	
Frost: Portrait of a Vampire	2002	Borrego Springs	
Galloping On	1925	Julian	
Ghostline	2015	San Diego	
The Girl, the Gold Watch & Everything	1980	Hotel del Coronado	
Glass Casa	2024	San Diego	
Hacksaw	2020	C Street Inn	
Hardcore	1979	San Diego Waterfront	
Heaven & Earth	1993	San Diego	
Hellcats of the Navy	1957	Naval Air Station North Island	
Hell Divers	1932	Naval Air Station North Island	
Hemet, or the Landlady Don't Drink Tea	2023	Ramona	
Hemet, or the Landlady Don't Drink Tea	2023	La Jolla	
Hot Shots!	1991	San Diego	
I Am Not a Hipster	2012	Golden Hill	
I Am Not a Hipster	2012	North Park	
I Am Not a Hipster	2012	South Park	
If You Should Leave Before Me	2025	San Diego	
The Immortal Edward Lumley	2013	San Diego	
In God We Tru$t	1980	Downtown San Diego	
In the Tall Grass	2019		
It's a Mad, Mad, Mad, Mad World	1963	San Diego	
K-9	1989	Hotel del Coronado	
K-9: P.I.	2002	San Diego	
The Kid from Left Field	1979	San Diego Stadium	
Kung Fu Ghost	2022	San Diego	
The Last Ride	2004	San Diego	
Little Nikita	1988	La Mesa	
Little Nikita	1988	San Diego	
Lords of Dogtown	2005	Imperial Beach	
The Lost World: Jurassic Park	1997	Downtown San Diego	
The Lost World: Jurassic Park	1997	Golden Mall	
The Lost World: Jurassic Park	1997	Granada Hills	
The Lost World: Jurassic Park	1997	San Pedro Harbor	
Love All You Have Left	2017	Pacific Beach	
Loving Couples	1980	Hotel del Coronado	
Lucky Lady	1975		
MacArthur	1977	Camp Pendleton	
The Married Virgin	1918	Hotel del Coronado	
The Master Chief: Part One	2023	San Diego	
The Mating Call	1928	Fallbrook	
The Mating Call	1928	San Diego	
Mega64 Version 4.1: Revengurrection	2021	San Diego	
Midway	1976	San Diego	
Mighty Oak	2020	Ocean Beach	
Miracle at Manchester	2022	Cathedral Catholic High School	
Most Likely to Succeed	2015		
Mr. Wrong	1996	Hotel del Coronado	
Murder and Cocktails	2024	Little Italy	
My Blue Heaven	1990	Atascadero Administration Building	
My Blue Heaven	1990	Hotel del Coronado	
My Blue Heaven	1990	San Luis Obispo	
My Blue Heaven	1990	Warner Bros. Studios	
My Blue Heaven	1990	Westchester	
My Husband's Wives	1924	Hotel del Coronado	
My Son, My Son, What Have Ye Done?	2009	Point Loma	
My Son, My Son, What Have Ye Done?	2009	Balboa Park	
My Son, My Son, What Have Ye Done?	2009	Downtown San Diego	
My Son, My Son, What Have Ye Done?	2009	Ocean Beach	
Mystery Highway	2023	San Diego	
No Man's Land	1987		
One Battle After Another	2025	Otay Mesa	
One Battle After Another	2025	San Diego	
One Battle After Another	2025	Westgate Hotel	
On the Beach	1959		
Only God Knows	2006	San Diego	
Paranormal Activity	2007	Rancho Peñasquitos	
Paranormal Activity 2	2010	Rancho Peñasquitos	
Paul	2011	Downtown San Diego	
Phantasm	1979	Julian	
The Playground	2017	San Diego	
Poto and Cabengo	1979	San Diego	
Princess Virtue	1917	Hotel del Coronado	
Raise the Titanic	1980	San Diego	
Rampage	2018		
Red Light Teachers	2026	San Diego	
Resolution	2012	East County	
Return of the Killer Tomatoes	1988	South Bay	
Riley	2023	East County	
Runaway Daughters	1994		
The Saint	2017		
The Samuel Project	2018	Balboa Park	
The Samuel Project	2018	Downtown San Diego	
The Samuel Project	2018	Hillcrest	
The Samuel Project	2018	La Jolla	
The Samuel Project	2018	Point Loma	
The Samuel Project	2018	Ramona	
San Diego, I Love You	1944		
San Diego Surf	2012		
San Diego's Gay Bar History	2018	Hillcrest	
Sarah Landon and the Paranormal Hour	2007	Fallbrook	
Sarah Landon and the Paranormal Hour	2007	Pine Valley	
Satan's Blade	1985	El Cajon	
Satan's Blade	1985	Julian	
Scarface	1983	Coronado Beach	
Scavenger Hunt	1979	Balboa Park	
Scavenger Hunt	1979	Downtown San Diego	
Scavenger Hunt	1979	Mission Beach	
Scavenger Hunt	1979	San Diego Stadium	
Sharpshooter	2007	Julian	
Sideways	2004	Santa Barbara County	
Sins of Silence	1996		
Sincerely Saul	2024	San Diego	
Skid Marks	2007	Hillcrest	
Skid Marks	2007	Kearny Mesa	
Skid Marks	2007	Point Loma	
Skin: The Movie	2020	Valley Center	
Slaughterhouse	1987	Lakeside	
Sleep Dealer	2008		
Some Like It Hot	1959	Hotel del Coronado	
South of 8	2016	Alpine	
South of 8	2016	City Heights	
South of 8	2016	C Street Inn	
South of 8	2016	La Jolla	
South of 8	2016	La Mesa	
South of 8	2016	Mission Valley	
South of 8	2016	National City	
South of 8	2016	Paradise Hills	
South of 8	2016	Ramona	
South of 8	2016	San Diego	
Splash	1984	Coronado Beach	
Spiker	1986	San Diego	
The Stunt Man	1980	Hotel del Coronado	
Surrogates	2009		
Sweet Taste of Souls	2020	Julian	
Tell It to the Marines	1926		
Tentacles	1977	Oceanside	
Tentacles	1977	San Diego	
The Terminators	2009	San Diego	
Texas Across the River	1966	San Diego	
Thane of East County	2015	Borrego Springs	
Thane of East County	2015	Fallbrook	
Thane of East County	2015	Victory Theatre	
Three Way	2004		
A Ticklish Affair	1963	Balboa Park	
A Ticklish Affair	1963	Naval Air Station North Island	
Tiger Cruise	2004		
To Fall in Love	2023	San Diego	
Top Dog	1995	Balboa Park	
Top Gun	1986	Kansas City Barbeque	
Top Gun	1986	Miramar Naval Air Station	
Top Gun	1986	New Point Loma Lighthouse	
Top Gun	1986	Oceanside	
Top Gun: Maverick	2022	Fort Rosecrans National Cememtery	
Top Gun: Maverick	2022	New Point Loma Lighthouse	
Traffic	2000	Balboa Park	
Traffic	2000	Downtown San Diego	
Traffic	2000	La Jolla	
Traffic	2000	Rancho Bernardo	
Transformers: Revenge of the Fallen	2009	Imperial Beach	
Transformers: Revenge of the Fallen	2009	Naval Amphibious Base Coronado	
Transformers: Revenge of the Fallen	2009	Naval Base Point Loma	
Transformers: Revenge of the Fallen	2009	San Diego Bay	
True to the Navy	1930		
The Very Thought of You	1944		
Wake Up, Ron Burgundy: The Lost Movie	2004	San Diego	
The Walk	2001		
Way of the Warrior Kid	2026	San Diego	
The Wedding Hustler	2023	Mission Valley	
The Wedding Hustler	2023	National City	
The Wedding Hustler	2023	Pechanga Resort & Casino	
Who Made the Potatoe Salad?	2006		
Why the Nativity?	2022	Lakeside	
Why the Nativity?	2022	Ramona	
Wicked, Wicked	1973	Hotel del Coronado	
Wings Over Honolulu	1937	Naval Air Station North Island	
You Can See Everything	2026	San Diego	
Yours for the Asking	1936	Hotel del Coronado	
Zipperface	1992		

== Short films ==
Title	Year	Ref.
The $5 Movie	2001	
Assumption	2017	
Daisy Belle	2018	
The Dark Resurgence: A Star Wars Story	2018	
Deviant	2018	
Fatty and Mabel at the San Diego Exposition	1915	
The Fifth of November	2018	
Fletcher and Jenks	2016	
The Flourish	2019	
Graduation Afternoon	2021	
The Heiress Lethal	2010	
Hush	2016	
The Last Butterflies	2023	
Leave 'Em Laughing	2020	
Libertyville	2021	
Once Guilty, Now Innocent, Still Dead	2017	
Our Barrio	2016	
The Phantom Hour	2016	
The Power Agent	2020	
Pulp Friction	2021	
A Rodeo Film	2021	
Things We Dig	2020	
Touch	2022	
We All Die Alone	2021	

== See also ==
- List of media set in San Diego
