= List of media set in San Diego =

San Diego list

This is a list of media set in San Diego, California, including media set in either the city of San Diego proper or in surrounding portions of San Diego County.

== Novels ==
- The Angel Gang by Ken Kuhlken (1993)
- The Fallen by T. Jefferson Parker (2006)
- Kiln People by David Brin (2002)
- The Loud Adios by Ken Kuhlken (1989)
- Rainbows End by Vernor Vinge (2006)
- Tijuana Straits by Kem Nunn (2004)
- The Vagabond Virgins by Ken Kuhlken (2008)
- The Venus Deal by Ken Kuhlken (1991)
- The Winter of Frankie Machine by Don Winslow (2006)

== Films ==
Feature films
Title	Year	Ref.
1 Night in San Diego	2020	
16-Love	2012	
Above the Tin	2018	
Adalynn	2023	
Almighty Zeus	2022	
Almost Famous	2000	
American Sniper	2014	
Anchorman: The Legend of Ron Burgundy	2004	
Anchorman 2: The Legend Continues	2013	
Antwone Fisher	2001	
Attack of the Killer Tomatoes	1978	
Babel	2006	
Bang Bang	2011	
Battle Cry	1955	
Battle: Los Angeles	2011	
Beneath the Leaves	2019	
Beyond the Rocks	1922	
The Big Mouth	1967	
Blame it on the Night	1984	
Blast	2004	
Bloody Wednesday	1988	
Borderline	1980	
The Boys in Company C	1978	
Bring It On	2000	
The Buildout	2024	
Carbon	2019	
Carving a Life	2017	
The Cell	2000	
Chubasco	1968	
The Coast of Folly	1925	
The Condor	2007	
Continuance	2021	
Coronado	1935	
Dangerous Curves	1988	
A Day Without a Mexican	2003	
Daydream Hotel	2017	
Demolition Man	1993	
Demon Protocol	2018	
The Devil and Max Devlin	1981	
Devil Dogs of the Air	1935	
Dive Bomber	1941	
Down in San Diego	1941	
Driven	2018	
Emanuelle and the White Slave Trade	1978	
The Endless	2017	
Eternity: The Movie	2014	
Everybody Dies by the End	2022	
The Evil Rises	2018	
Fast Times at Ridgemont High	1982	
Firefox	1982	
Flight Command	1940	
Flight of the Intruder	1990	
The Flying Fleet	1929	
Francis in the Navy	1955	
Freaky Friday	1976	
Friend of the World	2020	
Frost: Portrait of a Vampire	2002	
Galloping On	1925	
Ghostline	2015	
The Girl, the Gold Watch & Everything	1980	
Hacksaw	2020	
Hardcore	1979	
Heaven & Earth	1993	
Hellcats of the Navy	1957	
Hell Divers	1932	
Hot Shots!	1991	
I Am Not a Hipster	2012	
The Immortal Edward Lumley	2013	
In the Tall Grass	2019	
K-9	1989	
K-9: P.I.	2002	
The Kid from Left Field	1979	
Kung Fu Ghost	2022	
The Last Ride	2004	
Little Nikita	1988	
The Lost World: Jurassic Park	1997	
Love All You Have Left	2017	
Loving Couples	1980	
Lucky Lady	1975	
MacArthur	1977	
The Married Virgin	1918	
The Master Chief: Part One	2023	
The Mating Call	1928	
Mega64 Version 4.1: Revengurrection	2021	
Midway	1976	
Mighty Oak	2020	
Miracle at Manchester	2022	
Most Likely to Succeed	2015	
Mr. Wrong	1996	
Murder and Cocktails	2024	
My Blue Heaven	1990	
My Husband's Wives	1924	
My Son, My Son, What Have Ye Done?	2009	
No Man's Land	1987	
Novocaine	2025	
On the Beach	1959	
One Battle After Another	2025	
Only God Knows	2006	
Paranormal Activity	2007	
Paranormal Activity 2	2010	
Paul	2011	
Phantasm	1979	
The Playground	2017	
Poto and Cabengo	1979	
Princess Virtue	1917	
Rampage	2018	
Resolution	2012	
Return of the Killer Tomatoes	1988	
Riley	2023	
Runaway Daughters	1994	
The Saint	2017	
The Samuel Project	2018	
San Diego, I Love You	1944	
San Diego Surf	2012	
San Diego's Gay Bar History	2018	
Sarah Landon and the Paranormal Hour	2007	
Satan's Blade	1985	
Scarface	1983	
Scavenger Hunt	1979	
Sharpshooter	2007	
Sideways	2004	
Sins of Silence	1996	
Skid Marks	2007	
Skin: The Movie	2020	
Slaughterhouse	1987	
Sleep Dealer	2008	
South of 8	2016	
Spiker	1986	
The Stunt Man	1980	
Surrogates	2009	
Sweet Taste of Souls	2020	
Tell It to the Marines	1926	
Tentacles	1977	
The Terminators	2009	
Thane of East County	2015	
Three Way	2004	
A Ticklish Affair	1963	
Tiger Cruise	2004	
To Fall in Love	2023	
Top Dog	1995	
Top Gun	1986	
Top Gun: Maverick	2022	
Traffic	2000	
Transformers: Revenge of the Fallen	2009	
True to the Navy	1930	
The Very Thought of You	1944	
Wake Up, Ron Burgundy: The Lost Movie	2004	
The Walk	2001	
The Wedding Hustler	2023	
Who Made the Potatoe Salad?	2006	
Wicked, Wicked	1973	
Wings Over Honolulu	1937	
Zipperface	1992	

Short films
Title	Year	Ref.
The $5 Movie	2001	
Assumption	2017	
"The Case of Evil"	2014	
Daisy Belle	2018	
Deviant	2018	
Fatty and Mabel at the San Diego Exposition	1915	
The Fifth of November	2018	
Fletcher and Jenks	2016	
The Flourish	2019	
Graduation Afternoon	2021	
The Heiress Lethal	2010	
Hush	2016	
The Last Butterflies	2023	
Leave 'Em Laughing	2020	
Our Barrio	2016	
The Phantom Hour	2016	
The Power Agent	2020	
Pulp Friction	2021	
A Rodeo Film	2021	
Things We Dig	2020	
Touch	2022	
We All Die Alone	2021	

== TV shows ==
- Abby's on NBC (2019)
- Cavemen on ABC (2007)
- Drake & Josh on Nickelodeon (2004–2007)
- The Ex List on CBS (2008)
- The Fosters on ABC Family (2013–2018)
- The Game on The CW (2006–2009) and BET (2011–2015)
- Grace and Frankie on Netflix (2015–2022)
- Harry O on ABC (1974–1976)
- Hennesey on CBS (1959–1962)
- High Tide on Syndication (1994–1997)
- Hunter on NBC (2003 revival season)
- John from Cincinnati on HBO (2007)
- Manhunt on Syndication (1959–1961)
- NTSF:SD:SUV:: on Adult Swim (2011–2013)
- Physical on Apple TV (2021–2023)
- Pitch on Fox (2016–2017)
- Renegade on USA Network (1992–1997)
- Simon & Simon on CBS (1981–1988)
- Terriers on FX (2010)
- That '80s Show on Fox (2002)
- Veronica Mars on UPN (2004-2007)

=== Reality shows ===
- Beach Patrol on Court TV (2006 season)
- The Real World: San Diego on MTV (2004)

== Video games ==
- Midnight Club 3: Dub Edition and Midnight Club 3: Dub Edition Remix, a racing free roam city
- Tony Hawk's Underground Balboa Park is featured as a skate level

== Comic books/Manga ==
- Aquaman Vol. 6 #15–49 (March 2003–April 2006) and irregularly since (as Sub Diego)
- Fathom Vol. 1, 2, 4, and 5; certain portions of the comic book series take place in San Diego
- JoJo's Bizarre Adventure Part 7: Steel Ball Run Vol. 1 (2004); takes place in 1890s San Diego

== See also ==
- List of films shot in San Diego
