= Caroline Amiguet =

French actress, film producer, and model (born 1977)

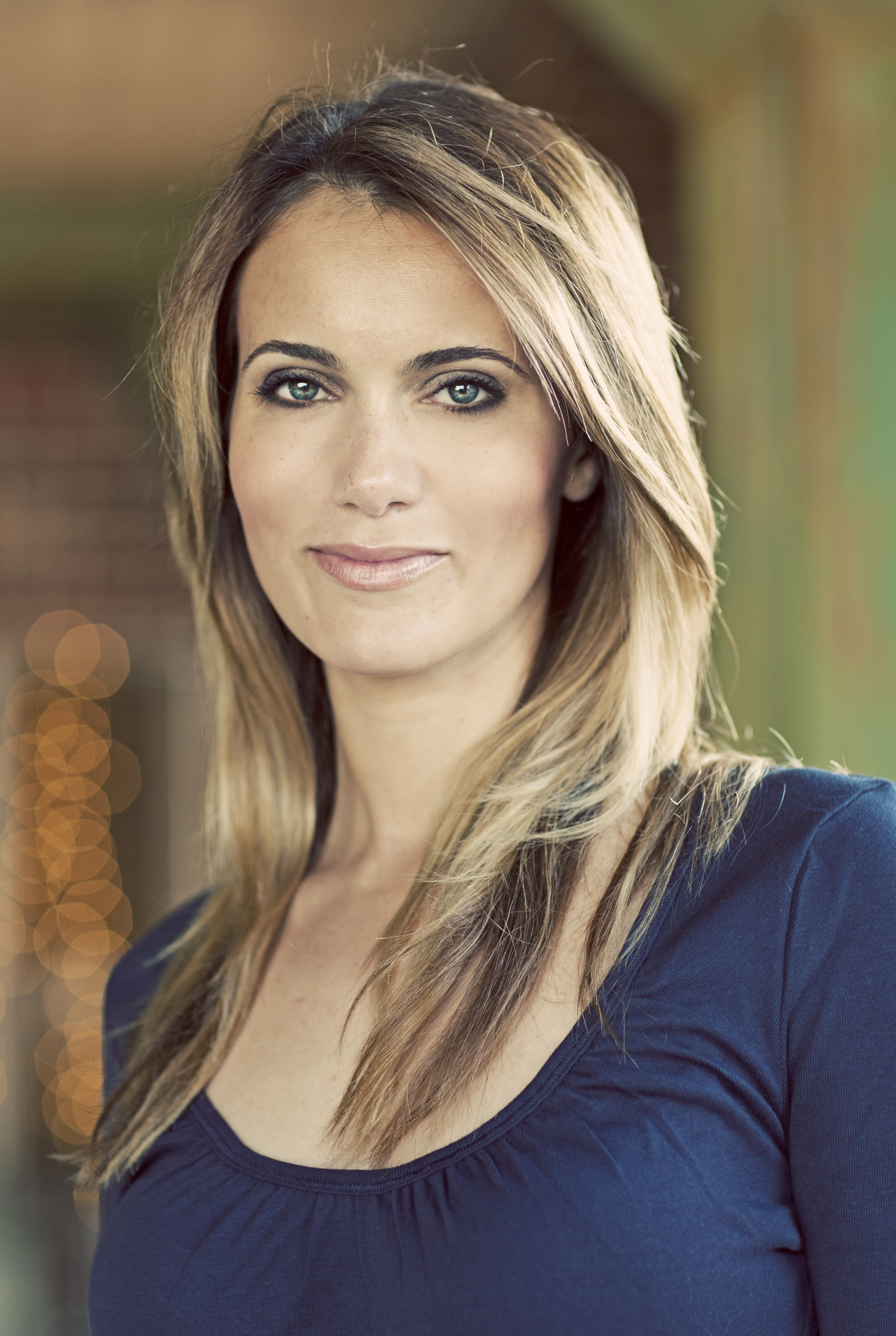
- Amiguet in 2012
- Born: May 23, 1977 (age 49); Paris, France
- Occupations: Actress; film producer; model
- Years active: 1997–present
- Spouse: Matt Sivertson (m. 2008)
- Website: carolineamiguet.com

Caroline Amiguet (born 23 May 1977) is a French actress, film producer, and model, best known for her roles in the films Love All You Have Left (2017), Angels Fallen (2020), and Everybody Dies by the End (2022), and for producing the short film Daisy Belle (2018). She has been nominated for best actress at the GI Film Festival San Diego in 2017 and at the Oceanside International Film Festival in 2022. She was crowned Miss Suisse romande in 1997.

== Life and career ==
Amiguet was born in Paris, France, grew up in Vaud, Switzerland, and was crowned Miss Suisse romande in 1997. She moved to San Diego in 2003, married Matt Sivertson of Autodesk in 2008, and settled in Pacific Beach around 2010.

In 2016, Amiguet filmed a tourist video in Vaud titled Pure Inspiration. In 2017, she produced the film Love All You Have Left, written and directed by her husband. The story was influenced by their visit to the Anne Frank House. The film, in which she co-starred with Sara Wolfkind, was filmed in its entirety at her home in Pacific Beach by William Wall.

In 2019, Amiguet worked with Brand USA on a tourism video in Sioux Falls, South Dakota. In 2022, she directed a play called 2 Weeks with Ma Mère at San Diego Mesa College, which she wrote inspired by a visit from her mother. That same year, she starred in the found footage mockumentary film Everybody Dies by the End, which was made during the COVID-19 pandemic.

== Filmography ==
Year	Title	Actor	Producer	Role	Notes
2008	2012: Doomsday	Yes	No	Dr. Trish Lane	by Nick Everhart
2009	El americano	Yes	No	Officer Pérez	Short film, 2nd Place Drama for ATAS Foundation College Television Awards
2011	Just Desserts	Yes	Executive	Valentine Fornier	Short film, story credit
2012	Lucy	Yes	No	Mother	Short film, Cannes Film Festival selection
2016	Pure Inspiration	No	Executive	Self	
2016	Daydream Hotel	Yes	Yes	Grace Taylor	
2017	Caravaggio and My Mother the Pope	Yes	No	Caterina Sforza	
2017	Refuge	Yes	No	Carla Petit	Short film featuring Karenssa LeGear
2017	Love All You Have Left	Yes	Executive	Juliette Forster	
2018	Daisy Belle	No	Executive	—N/a	
2018	Demon Protocol	Yes	No	Anna Wilson	Featuring Gary Graham and David Gerrold
2019	Poverty of Will	Yes	No	Cadence Kersberg	Short film
2019	The Art of Self-Defense	Yes	No	French Audio Instructor	Voice
2019	Old Aquatics	Yes	Executive	Edie Bowprey	Short film
2020	Angels Fallen	Yes	No	Valentina	
2021	Angel Mountain	Yes	No	Agnes	
2021	Immortal Game	Yes	No	Ema	Short film featuring Randy Davison
2022	Everybody Dies by the End	Yes	No	Laura	
2022	3 Little Kungpoo Goats	Yes	No	Big Hungry One	Voice
2023	Riley	Yes	No	Madame Dupont / French Teacher	
2024	Murder and Cocktails	Yes	No	Maizie	
2024	Kerfol	Yes	No	Marie Lanrivain	Short film
2024	Frenchie	Yes	No	Frenchie	Short film
2024	Sincerely Saul	Yes	No	The Madam	
	Daydreamer	Yes	No	Fabiana	

== Stage credits ==
Year	Title	Role	Location	Notes
2023	The Red Lamp	Annie	Community Actor's Theatre, San Diego, California	
2022	2 Weeks with Ma Mère	—N/a	Mesa College Theatre Company, San Diego, California	Director
2022	Pardon My French	Self	Zephyr Theatre, Los Angeles, California	
2019	Old Aquatics	Edie Bowprey	Clairemont Act One Community Theatre, San Diego, California	

== Dubbing ==
Year	Title	Role	Notes	Ref.
2014	The Hundred-Foot Journey	ADR	voice	
2018	The 15:17 to Paris	ADR	voice: English version	
2018	State Like Sleep	ADR	voice: English version	
2018	Mamma Mia! Here We Go Again	ADR performer	voice	
2021	Resort to Love	ADR Actor	voice	

Accolades
List of awards and nominations
Event	Year	Award	Title	Result	Ref.
Oceanside International Film Festival	2022	Best Actress in a Lead Role	Immortal Game	Nominated	
GI Film Festival San Diego	2017	Best Actress	Refuge	Nominated	
San Diego Film Awards	2014	Best Actress	Just Desserts	Won	
