= Whitney Wegman-Wood =

American actress

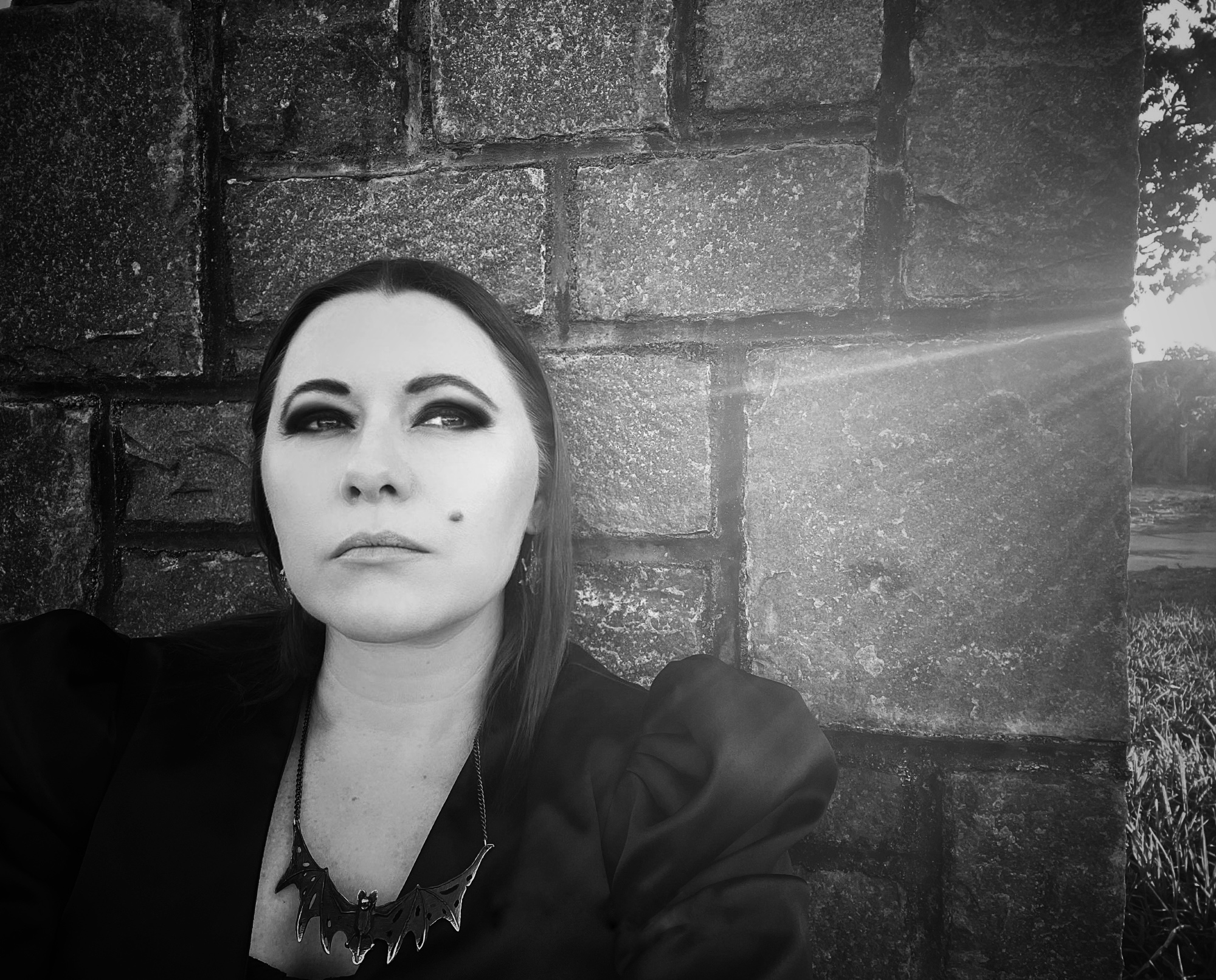
- Wegman-Wood in 2024
- Born: Whitney Elaine Wegman; Columbia, Missouri, U.S.
- Education: Washington High School; Avila University; University of Virginia
- Occupations: Actress; screenwriter; film producer
- Known for: The Last Butterflies
- Notable credits: Kung Fu Ghost; The Evil Rises
- Parents: Fred Wegman (father); Sharon Hubenthal (mother)
- Awards: 2023 Frances Marion Award at Coronado Island Film Festival
- Website: whitneywegmanwood.com

Whitney Elaine Wegman-Wood is an American actress, screenwriter and film producer who wrote, produced and starred in the film The Last Butterflies (2023), and appeared in the films Kung Fu Ghost (2022), Carbon (2019), and The Evil Rises (2018).

== Personal life ==
Wegman-Wood was born in Columbia, Missouri, to Fred Wegman and Sharon Hubenthal. She graduated from Washington High School, attended Avila University, and was involved with the Hurricane Katrina disaster relief. After living in Atlanta, Georgia, she pursued a Master of Fine Arts at the University of Virginia.

== Career ==
Wegman-Wood is an actress who frequently works in multiple markets across the country. In 2023, she wrote, produced and acted in a short film called The Last Butterflies and received the Frances Marion Award for outstanding achievement in screenwriting by a woman at Coronado Island Film Festival.

== Filmography ==
Year	Title	Role	Notes
2008	Nobody Gets Out Alive	Paris Girl	
2015	Gulag Barashevo	Tatiana	
2018	The Evil Rises	Lucy	
2018	Valhalla	Carson	
2019	Carbon	Carson	
2021	Mystery Highway	Bonnie / Henrietta Hill	
2022	Kung Fu Ghost	The Boss	
2023	The Last Butterflies	Mom	Also screenwriter and producer
2023	The Mad Doctor of the Intercontinental Hotel	Eva	Screened at the 13th Oceanside International Film Festival
