= The Ten Commandments (2007 film) =

2007 animated film

- DVD cover
- Directed by: John Stronach; Bill Boyce
- Written by: Ed Naha
- Produced by: Cindy Bond; John Stronach
- Starring: Christian Slater; Alfred Molina; Elliott Gould
- Narrated by: Ben Kingsley
- Edited by: Adam Scott
- Music by: Reg Powell
- Production companies: Huhu Studios; iVL Animation; Sparky Animation; Ten Chimneys Entertainment
- Distributed by: Promenade Pictures
- Release date: October 19, 2007
- Running time: 88 minutes
- Countries: United States; Canada
- Language: English
- Budget: $10 million
- Box office: $1.1 million

The Ten Commandments is a 2007 animated biblical fantasy film directed by John Stronach and Bill Boyce, and written by Ed Naha. The film follows Moses from his childhood, as the adopted grandson of Pharaoh, to his adulthood, as the chosen one of Yahweh and liberator of his people.

With narration by Ben Kingsley, the film stars Christian Slater as Moses, Alfred Molina as Ramses and Elliott Gould as God. It was theatrically released on October 19, 2007 to largely negative reviews. It was also a box office failure, having grossed only $1.1 million against a budget of $10 million, resulting in having the worst opening for an animated movie in history.

== Plot ==
The Pharaoh is a nervous man, outnumbered by his Hebrew slaves; he orders them to be worked harder, that doesn't break their spirits, so he has all the newborn male babies thrown into the Nile; Moses' parents, Amram and Jochebed, are desperate to save their baby son, and put him in a basket and send him down the river while his sister, Miram, follows to make sure he's okay. The next morning, the Pharaoh's daughter adopts and raises him as her own, with Jochebed as his nurse growing up. His playmate and uncle is Ramses, the Pharaoh's son. As teens, they wrestle, but Ramses does not like Moses much, and Moses is exiled from town after Moses comes to the aid of a slave being beaten, and the beater is killed. Moses is mistaken for a Hebrew slave based on his appearance. His brother Aaron comes forward, revealing his past and how they are actually brothers-making Moses a Hebrew.

They all grow up, Ramses is now Pharaoh, God speaks to Moses, telling him to get the Hebrews from Egypt into the promised land. Ramses says no, the ten plagues come, and Ramses gives in only when his son is killed (as God's spirit kills all the firstborn Egyptian sons). Moses leads the people from Egypt, ditches Ramses and his army at the parting of the Red Sea, and Moses receives the Ten Commandments and delivers them to the Hebrews. Moses puts Joshua in charge of leading the people the rest of the way.

== Cast ==
- Ben Kingsley as the Narrator
- Christian Slater as Moses
- Alfred Molina as Ramses
- Elliott Gould as God
- Scott McNeil as Seti
- Christopher Gaze as Aaron
- Kathleen Barr as Miriam
- Lee Tockar as Dathan
- Matt Hill as Joshua
- Tabitha St. Germain (credited as "Kitanou St. Germain") as the Princess
- Trevor Devall as Amram
- Jane Mortifee as Zipporah
- Brian Dobson as the Task Master
- Garry Chalk as the General
- Nico Ghisi as Ramses' Son
- Colin Murdock as the Elderly Slave

== Box office ==
The film opened in 830 theaters in the United States and grossed $478,910 on its opening weekend. Brandon Gray of Box Office Mojo wrote that it and Sarah Landon and the Paranormal Hour had "two of the worst national debuts of all time". The film ended up grossing $952,820 in the United States and $99,087 elsewhere, for a total of $1,051,907.

== Reception ==
On the review aggregator website Rotten Tomatoes, 19% of 21 critics' reviews are positive. The website's consensus reads: "The Ten Commandments proves that not even one of humanity's most enduring tales is strong enough to overcome a biblical plague of cheap-looking animation." Metacritic, which uses a weighted average, assigned the film a score of 25 out of 100, based on 6 critics, indicating "generally unfavorable" reviews.

Joe Ledyon of Variety gave a negative review, calling it "a well-intentioned misfire featuring 3-D CGI animation that recalls lesser vidgames [sic] of the mid-1990s".

Keith Phipps of The A.V. Club wrote that it "fails on every conceivable level" and "seems to have been made using public-domain software, and targeted squarely at kids impressed by any brightly colored moving objects".

Roger Moore of the Orlando Sentinel was also critical, writing "a big-name voice cast doesn't cover for a script that may hit the Biblical high points but somehow misses the dramatic heart of the story", and that "the filmmakers certainly could have used a little VeggieTales humor".

Lou Carlozo of the Chicago Tribune was more positive, stating "There's an endearing, earnest quality to The Ten Commandments that transcends its star-studded cast and computer-generated animation".
