= Lucy Boryer =

American actress

- Born: February 14, 1966 (age 59)
- Occupation: Actress
- Years active: 1987–present

Lucy Boryer is an American actress. She is best known for her role as Janine Stewart on the comedy-drama series Doogie Howser, M.D. Recurring in the first season; she was promoted as a main cast member in second season until the end of season three. She reprised her role for two additional episodes in the fourth and final season.

Boryer's other television credits are Star Trek: The Next Generation, Major Dad and the ABC Afterschool Special "The Day the Kid Went Punk". She also appeared in the films Zapped Again! (1990), Sleepwalkers (1992), and the television films Body Bags (1993) and In the Line of Duty: The Price of Vengeance (1994).

== Filmography ==
Year	Title	Role	Notes
1987	ABC Afterschool Special	Girl	Episode: "The Day the Kid Went Punk"
1989–1993	Doogie Howser, M.D.	Janine Stewart	Recurring role (season 1), Series regular (season 2–3), 2 episodes (season 4)
1990	Zapped Again!	Friend #1	Direct-to-video film
1992	Sleepwalkers	Jeanette	Theatrical film
1992	Star Trek: The Next Generation	Ensign Janeway	Episode: "Man of the People"
1992	Major Dad	Melissa	Episode: "One for the Road"
1993	Body Bags	Peggy (in the segment "The Gas Station")	Television film
1994	In the Line of Duty: The Price of Vengeance	Unknown	Television film
2001	Murder Among Friends	Rhonda	Television film
2012	Let's Big Happy	Party Mom	Episode: "Andrew W.K."
2013	Unusual Suspects	Investigater	Short film
2015	Beat The Heat	Umpire Lucy	Short film
2016	Our Lips Are Sealed	Rabid Fan	Short film
2016	Anti Social	Mrs. Parker	Short film
2016	(Mis)Adventures in Hollywood	Suzanne	Episode: "Reese Witherspoon"
2017	Dreadspace	Tim's Mom	Short film
2017	Tosh.O	MOM	Episode: "Golf Fight"
2018	God's Gracie	Kathy	Short film
2018	Tater	Mom	Short film
2018	An Ordinary Day	Sally Smithson	Short film
2019	Liza on Demand	Women	Episode: "The Art of Settling"
2020	My Nightmare Landlord	Lucia	Television film
2020	Hard Luck Love Song	Cross Eyed Women	Theatrical film
2024	Murder and Cocktails	Rose	Theatrical film
