= Benjamin Howard (filmmaker) =

American filmmaker

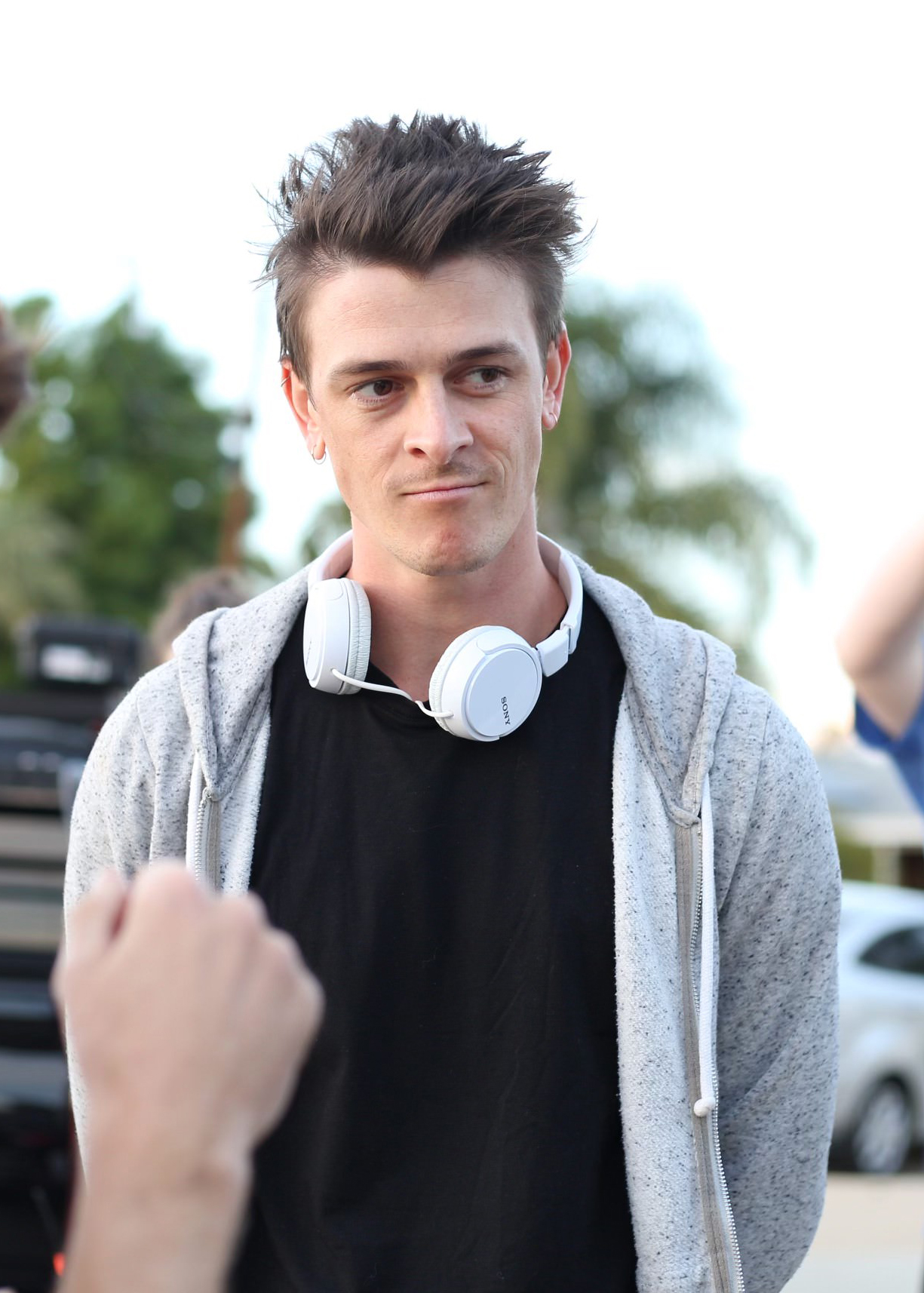
- Howard on the set of Riley, 2022
- Other name: Ben Howard
- Education: Valhalla High School; San Diego State University; University of California, Los Angeles
- Occupation: Filmmaker
- Years active: 2015–present
- Known for: Riley
- Notable work: Deviant; We All Die Alone
- Father: John Howard
- Awards: 2019 Student Programming - Short Form Emmy at Pacific Southwest Chapter of the National Television Academy for Deviant
- Website: windsorfilmcompany.com

Benjamin Howard is an American film director, screenwriter, film producer and film editor who is known for the films Deviant (2018), Rendezvous (2021), and Riley (2023).

== Early life ==
Howard grew up in East County, San Diego, graduating from Valhalla High School in 2013. He received a Master of Fine Arts in Film Production / Directing at UCLA after briefly attending SDSU. His father John Howard is a sportscaster at KFMB-TV.

== Career ==
In 2017, Howard remade the music video for Do They Know It's Christmas? with developmentally disabled students. His short film Deviant premiered in 2018 at Dances with Films and won a Student Emmy Award in 2019. Howard made the short film Rendezvous at UCLA, which screened at FilmOut San Diego in 2022.

=== Riley ===
Howard's debut feature film Riley premiered at Calgary International Film Festival and is an expansion of his short film Rendezvous. He based the story on his own experiences as a high school athlete trying to come out. The film won eight San Diego Film Awards.

== Filmography ==
Short films
Year	Title	Director	Writer	Producer	Notes
2015	Toast	Yes	Yes	Executive	
2016	The Final Days of Elliot Morrison	Yes	Yes	Executive	
2016	No Teeth	Yes	Yes	Executive	
2016	Disconnect	Yes	Yes	Yes	
2016	Sleep on It	Yes	Yes	Executive	
2017	Adolescence	Yes	Yes	No	
2018	Deviant	Yes	Co-writer	Co-producer	
2019	Snakeskin	Yes	No	No	
2020	Immersion	Yes	Yes	Co-producer	
2021	We All Die Alone	No	No	No	First assistant director
2021	Rendezvous	Yes	Yes	Co-producer	

Feature films
Year	Title	Director	Writer	Producer
2023	Riley	Yes	Yes	Yes
2024	Adjunct	No	No	Executive
