= Zapped Again! =

1990 film by Doug Campbell

- Directed by: Doug Campbell
- Screenplay by: Jack Morris; Vince Cheung; Ben Montanio
- Story by: Jack Morris
- Based on: Zapped! by Bruce Rubin; Robert J. Rosenthal
- Produced by: Jeff Apple; Robert J. Rosenthal
- Starring: Todd Eric Andrews; Kelli Williams; Reed Rudy; Linda Blair; Karen Black; Lyle Alzado
- Cinematography: Tom Grubbs
- Edited by: Michael Spence
- Music by: Brian Scott Bennett
- Production company: ITC Entertainment
- Distributed by: Nelson Entertainment
- Release date: April 14, 1990
- Running time: 96 minutes
- Country: United States
- Language: English

Zapped Again! is a 1990 American direct-to-video science fiction comedy film directed by Doug Campbell and starring Todd Eric Andrews and Kelli Williams. It is a sequel to Zapped! (1982).

== Plot ==
Kevin Matthews becomes a new pupil at Ralph Waldo Emerson High School. Rejected by the trendy Key Club, he instead joins the Science Club. There, he accidentally discovers a number of vials that were made by former student Barney Springboro (from the original film) behind a hidden panel in the lab.

After drinking the contents of the vials, Kevin develops psychokinetic powers. He amuses himself by lifting girls' dresses and humiliating the Key Club jocks, becoming popular in the process. However, the Key Club plots a cruel revenge.

== Cast ==
- Todd Eric Andrews as Kevin Matthews
- Reed Rudy as Wayne
- Ira Heiden as Elliott
- David Donah as Cecil
- M.K. Harris as Mike
- Maria McCann as Amanda
- Ross Harris as Chris
- Linda Larkin as Joanne
- Sue Ane Langdon as Miss Rose Burnhart
- Linda Blair as Miss Mitchell
- Karen Black as Teacher
- Lyle Alzado as Coach Kirby
- Kelli Williams as Lucy Kaminsky
- Michael Colyar as Shelton
- Brent Hinkley as Larry
- Shannon Wilcox as Mrs. Matthews
- Lucy Boryer as Friend

== Production ==
Filming completed in May of 1989.

== Release ==
Released direct-to-video in United States on April 26, 1990.

== Reception ==
On Rotten Tomatoes, the film has an approval rating of 0% based on reviews from 5 critics.
