= Sue Vicory =

American film producer

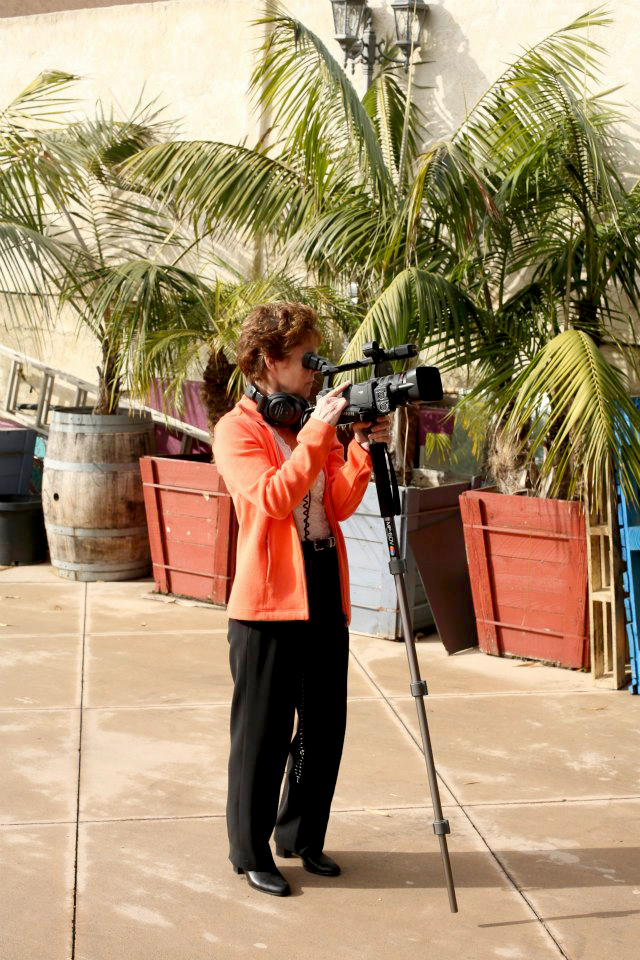
- Born: DeKalb, Illinois
- Education: Webster University
- Occupations: Writer; film producer; filmmaker
- Known for: Homelessness & the Power of One; Kansas City Jazz & Blues: Past, Present & Future

Sue Vicory is an American director, producer, and filmmaker. She is a six-time Emmy Award nominee and a seven-time Telly Award winner, and the founder of the nonprofit production company Heartland Films, Inc.

== Early life ==
Vicory was born in DeKalb, Illinois and grew up in the Midwestern United States. She earned a bachelor’s degree from Washburn University and a master’s degree in Computer Resource Management from Webster University.

== Career ==
=== Business career ===
In 1987, Vicory joined her family business, W. F. Norman Corporation in Nevada, Missouri, serving as co-owner and vice president of the company, which was founded in 1898.

=== Film career ===
Vicory entered filmmaking in 2002 after attending the New York Film Academy. Her first film, Homelessness & the Power of One, premiered in 2005 and examined homelessness in multiple U.S. cities, raising more than $200,000 for shelters. The film received numerous awards and was followed by related educational and community initiatives, including the My Power of One project in urban high schools.

In 2003, she founded Heartland Films, Inc., focusing on community-based and socially engaged projects.

Vicory directed and produced the feature documentary Kansas City Jazz & Blues: Past, Present & Future, which premiered at the Gem Theater and later aired on KCPT and KTWU. She also released 1898: The W. F. Norman Story, documenting her family’s historic manufacturing company.

Her feature documentary One explored themes of global humanity and personal impact and won a Telly Award. In the same year, she completed the narrative short Absent, which won an audience award at its San Diego premiere and later received a Telly Award.

In 2015, Vicory founded Team XX, an all-female filmmaking team that produced the short film Down Stage, nominated for a San Diego film award and winner of a 2016 Telly Award. She also produced the pilot for the web series My Power of One and later directed the eight-part series Finding Freedom Within.

In 2016, Vicory undertook a year-long, 48-state tour titled My Power of One – 12 Acts of Kindness, producing community projects and raising funds for nonprofit organizations across the United States.

She served as an associate producer on the reality television series Win Place Show, which aired on TVG Network.

Her feature documentary Original Jayhawker premiered in 2021, was nominated for an Emmy Award, won a Telly Award in 2022, and raised more than $30,000 for a community splash-park project at its premiere. The film later aired on KTWU and Kansas City PBS.

Vicory has also executive produced and co-produced a range of narrative, documentary, and music-related projects, including Panic at Parq, The Last Butterflies, Cultivating Kindness (Telly Award winner), and the feature documentary A Beautiful Place, which is in post-production.

Vicory is the creator and host of the podcast series The Wizard of One (launched in 2022), featuring interviews with individuals from across the United States.

Vicory has served as a judge for both regional and national Emmy Awards. She is a member of the Alliance of Women Directors and serves on the Board of Advisors of the San Diego Film Consortium.

She has appeared as a panelist and moderator at major industry events, including the Sundance Film Festival, the Cannes Film Festival festival cannes france and the French Riviera Film Festival, as well as multiple women-focused film industry panels in the United States and abroad.

Vicory received a Lifetime Achievement Award from Washburn University, and the San Diego Film Awards established the Sue Vicory Women in Film Award in her honor.

== Awards ==
Sue received an Industry Excellence Award at the French Riviera Film Festivals's awards ceremony. Her production company, Heartland Films, Inc. Executive Produced the San Diego film awards which aired on KPBS in May 2021. Vicory presented the My Power of One award and the Best Child Actor award. She received a Lifetime Achievement award from Washburn University. The San Diego film awards have named the Women in Film award the "Sue Vicory Women in Film Award".

== Personal life ==
Vicory married her college fellow, Jay, in 1978. They have two daughters and one grandson. She is a longtime runner and has completed three marathons. Vicory and her husband live in Overland Park, Kansas, on a farm that includes a small vineyard.

== Filmography ==
Year	Title	Notes
2003	Homelessness and the Power of One	Documentary short
2011	Kansas City Jazz & Blues; Past, Present & Future	Documentary
2011	1898: The W.F. Norman Story	Documentary short
2014	One	Documentary
2014	Absent	Short film
2015	The Brazilian Affair	Short film / executive producer
2015	Down Stage	Short film
2015	My Power of One	TV Short
2015	San Diego Film Awards	TV Special
2016	Film InDiego	TV Series documentary / executive producer – 6 episodes
2016	San Diego Film Awards	TV Special / co-producer
2016	Aberrant	Short film / executive producer
2017	San Diego Film Awards	TV Special
2017	Different Flowers	Executive producer
2018	Intentions	Short film / producer
2019	Jump Start a Life Telethon	TV Movie / executive producer / line producer
2019	Deep In Her Heart	Short film / executive producer
2020	She	Documentary / executive producer
2021	7th Annual San Diego Film Awards	TV Special / executive producer
2021	Simple Twist	Executive producer
2021	Original Jayhawk	Executive producer
2022	Athenia's Last Voyage	Documentary / associate producer / post-production
2023	The Last Butterflies	Short film / executive producer
