= Borderline (1980 film) =

American-Mexican action drama film by Jerrold Freedman

- Theatrical release poster by Drew Struzan
- Directed by: Jerrold Freedman
- Written by: Jerrold Freedman; Steve Kline
- Produced by: James Nelson
- Starring: Charles Bronson
- Cinematography: Tak Fujimoto
- Edited by: John F. Link
- Music by: Gil Melle
- Production companies: ITC Entertainment; Marble Arch Productions
- Distributed by: Associated Film Distribution
- Release date: 1980
- Running time: 104 minutes
- Countries: United States; Mexico
- Languages: English; Spanish
- Budget: $5.8 million
- Box office: $4.3 million

Borderline is a 1980 American-Mexican action drama film directed and co-written by Jerrold Freedman. Starring Charles Bronson, Ed Harris and Bruno Kirby, it is set in the San Diego–Tijuana area of the U.S.-Mexican border and follows a United States Border Patrol (USBP) Agent who poses as an illegal alien to catch a killer smuggling laborers from Mexico.

== Plot ==
Patrol Agent in Charge Jeb Maynard (Bronson) is trying to identify the killers of a young Mexican boy and Maynard's friend, veteran USBP Senior Patrol Agent "Scooter" Jackson (Wilford Brimley). Maynard is the Agent in Charge of Otay Border Patrol Station (a fictional composite of the actual El Cajon and Brown Field stations), located in the hills east of San Diego. He is later helped by the boy's mother, Elena Morales (Karmin Murcelo) and a rookie Patrol Agent, Jimmy Fantes (Bruno Kirby). Hotchkiss (Harris) is an illegal alien smuggler, known by the aliens only as "the Marine." Hotchkiss works for a local fruit rancher, Carl Richards (Bert Remsen), a ranch he uses as a front for his alien-smuggling operation.

Jackson, on routine road patrol, stops Hotchkiss's truck full of aliens, driven by a subordinate smuggler. The truck has boxes of tomatoes on top but the main body, accessed by rear doors, is a compartment carrying illegal aliens. When Jackson demands the driver open the back of the truck, Hotchkiss riding in back with the aliens shoots Jackson with a sawn-off shotgun at close range. The Mexican boy is badly wounded by stray buckshot, so Hotchkiss kills him with another blast and drags both bodies into the roadside bushes where he also parks Jackson's Border Patrol sedan. The F.B.I. is called to investigate, having primary jurisdiction investigating murders of any federal agents. The truck's driver, disturbed by the murders, is later killed when Hotchkiss wrecks the truck, attempting to mislead the FBI and the Border Patrol into believing the murders were related to drug smuggling. Maynard thinks Jackson was murdered by smugglers of aliens and tries to convince the F.B.I. that the marijuana in the truck was merely a ruse, but the F.B.I. does not want to believe him. The FBI seems convinced the murders are drug related, but not Jeb Maynard who doesn't believe someone would go to the trouble of removing all identifying information from the truck but carelessly leave several bags of marijuana behind.

Jackson's and the Mexican boy's bodies are found by USBP Agents where Hotchkiss had hidden them. Agent Fantes discovers some fresh tomatoes near the bodies and Agent Maynard notices military style boot prints with odd markings on the soles among the footprints at the crime scene. A Patrol Agent's professional skills include "sign-cutting," knowing how to examine, analyze and interpret tracks and marks made in the ground, a skill used to track illegal border crossings, and his suspicion is aroused. Maynard has Fantes take the tomatoes to a university's agriculture department for analysis. Meanwhile Maynard and Fantes start checking the trails in the hills that the smugglers use to bring in illegal aliens and drugs. They find the same military boot prints along a trail where a USBP electronic ground sensor has been dug up and disabled. Hotchkiss, running a sophisticated and highly profitable alien smuggling operation, is a former U.S. Marine who had been trained on such equipment while in the Marine Corps. He had discovered the sensor and had disabled it on a prior smuggling run.

After Jackson's funeral Maynard tells his boss, INS Commissioner Malcolm Wallace, about his suspicions. Wallace cautions him to proceed carefully, so Maynard begins his own investigation with Fantes's assistance. Maynard had found a San Diego address on a piece of paper in the murdered Mexican boy's clothes, and so goes there to discover the boy's mother, Elena Morales, working as a nanny at a well-to-do family's home. He takes her to the morgue to identify her son's remains and then asks for her help to find the killers. Elena agrees, so Maynard goes undercover posing as her cousin. They cross into Mexico and she introduces him to an alien smuggler in Tijuana who had brought her over the border when she last crossed. This smuggler is Hotchkiss's partner in Mexico. Maynard's physical features are such that he can pass for Mexican, but he does not speak Spanish fluently, and so Elena tells the smuggler that her cousin is simple minded and doesn't talk much.

Elena pays the smuggler with money Maynard gave her, and they are smuggled across the border into the United States along with a group of thirty other migrants. Maynard hears the smuggler guiding them mention "the Marine who runs things" to Elena, but then the group is ambushed by bandits. Maynard and Elena escape unharmed but lose their chance to encounter the ringleader (Hotchkiss) and walk on towards the suburbs of San Diego. He drives Elena home and thanks her for helping, saying that if she stops by his office next week, he will try to help her straighten out her U.S. immigration status.

Maynard goes home, cleans up and tries to sleep. Fantes stops by to tell him the agriculture report on the tomatoes indicates they were treated with a particular brand of pesticide. Fantes has checked with the local office of the U.S. Dept. of Agriculture and discovered that only a few large farms in the area use the brand. They meet later at the Border Patrol station to plan their next move. Maynard and Fantes visit the local fruit farms using that pesticide and arrive at Richards's fruit ranch. Maynard knows of Richards's reputation for exploiting illegal aliens, hiring them at poor wages to harvest his fruit. Hotchkiss is in the main ranch house when Maynard and Fantes arrive but stays inside as Richards goes out to speak to the Agents. While talking to Richards, Maynard notices the military boot prints in the dirt near the main house that he had detected earlier.

Maynard and Fantes set up a surveillance of the ranch with the assistance of Border Patrol Agents Lambert and Monroe. Using binoculars, they see Hotchkiss wearing his combat boots and camouflage marine field jacket leaving the house with other smugglers including the Mexican who had guided the group that Maynard and Elena had infiltrated. Maynard has found "the Marine." Hotchkiss plans a large smuggling run soon that will bring hundreds of illegal aliens into the U.S. in one night, after which he plans to shut down operations until things cool off. Maynard deduces Hotchkiss's plans from what he witnesses in surveilling the ranch over the following days, calls all his agents together at the station and plans an operation to raid the Richards Ranch next evening.

They raid the ranch after dark, capture the illegal aliens and smugglers and hold them in the ranch's main barn. At dawn, Hotchkiss arrives with the last load of aliens. As the Patrol Agents attempt to arrest him, he pulls out a MAC-10 machine-pistol and fires at them. They take cover and Hotchkiss jumps in a car and speeds away, but Maynard pursues him in a Border Patrol S.U.V. Hotchkiss attempts to lose him on an old dirt road that comes to a dead end, and then runs into the surrounding trees and bushes. Maynard draws his revolver and tracks him through the woods. Hotchkiss circles back thinking he has given Maynard the slip, but just as he is about to get back into his car, Maynard appears with his revolver pointed at Hotchkiss and says, "The end of the road." Hotchkiss wheels about and starts firing but Maynard kills Hotchkiss with a single shot.

Maynard and Fantes watch Richards leaving San Diego's United States District Court House after being sentenced to two-to-five years in federal prison. Richards' boss, also on trial, is not convicted for "lack of evidence." Fantes laments that Richards will probably go right back to work smuggling aliens within a month of release. Maynard smiles and responds by saying, "It's okay kid, so will we."

== Cast ==
- Charles Bronson as Patrol Agent in Charge Jeb Maynard
- Wilford Brimley as Senior Patrol Agent Scooter Jackson
- Bruno Kirby as Border Patrol Agent Jimmy Fantes
- Ed Harris as Hotchkiss
- Michael Lerner as Henry Lydell
- Bert Remsen as Carl Richards
- Kenneth McMillan as INS Commissioner Malcolm Wallace
- Karmin Murcelo as Elena Morales
- Norman Alden as Supervisory Border Patrol Agent Willie Lambert
- John Ashton as Border Patrol Agent Charlie Monroe
- Charles Cyphers as Ski
- Enrique Castillo as Arturo

== Production ==
According to director Jerrold Freedman, Producer/Actor Michael Douglas was originally set to produce the movie, with Gene Hackman set to play Jeb Maynard. However, once the screenplay was finished, Hackman had made the decision to retire from acting, something he did numerous times during his career. Once Bronson was attached, Douglas lost interest, claiming he had no desire to make a "Charlie Bronson movie."

This film received the technical support of the United States Border Patrol and the United States Immigration and Naturalization Service. Veteran United States Border Patrol Agents served as technical advisors during the making of the film. The Border Patrol uniforms, firearms, "sign-cutting" techniques, and vehicles used during the film were all accurate.

It was the first major film made on the topic of illegal border crossings, although it was shortly followed by another, The Border. Filming started in San Diego in December 1979. Two thousand extras were used to play illegal aliens.

Bronson said, "I didn't do the film entirely for altruistic reasons but the issue does interest me. Here are these people whose lives are simply caught up in politics. They almost live in the United States and they are willing to do the work that some Americans aren't willing to do."

== Reception ==
=== Box office ===
By 1981 the film had generated over $4 million. A Spanish subtitled version proved especially popular in the border states.

=== Critical response ===
Tom Buckley of The New York Times said the film "has an air of cheapness and improvisation. The characterization and dialogue are rudimentary, as is the direction".

== See also ==
- List of media set in San Diego
