= Karenssa LeGear =

American actress

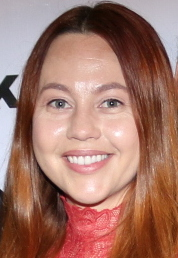
- LeGear in 2019
- Education: Vista High School; University of California, Los Angeles
- Occupations: Actress; filmmaker
- Years active: 2001–present
- Known for: Musical theatre performances throughout California, Arkansas, Arizona and film roles for television network Lifetime
- Notable credits: Carving a Life; Cosette in Les Misérables; Puck in A Midsummer Night's Dream; Man of La Mancha; The House of Yes; Veronica Mars

Karenssa LeGear is an American actress, filmmaker and SAG/AFTRA member who appeared in musical theatre plays including Les Misérables (2014) as Cosette and Puck in A Midsummer Night's Dream (2007). She has Best Actress nominations at Idyllwild International Festival of Cinema for Carving a Life (2017) and at GI Film Festival San Diego for Refuge (2017).

== Early life ==
LeGear grew up in Oceanside, California, starting her career as a singer at age 13. She graduated from Vista High School and holds a bachelor of arts degree in music-voice at University of California, Los Angeles. In 2015, LeGear graduated from Ruskin School of Acting where she studied Meisner technique. She is a member of SAG-AFTRA and Actors' Equity Association and has dual citizenship in the United States and Australia.

== Career ==
In 2004, LeGear portrayed Margarita Fischer for a recreation of the historical past at Rancho Buena Vista Adobe. She has performed in several musicals and plays including The Legend of Sleepy Hollow and Les Misérables and has conducted interviews with Geena Davis, Adrien Brody and John Boyega for That's My Entertainment at the San Diego International Film Festival. In 2017, LeGear starred as Lauren in Carving a Life. The film was not well received but Adam Keller at Film Threat said her performance was "solid" and Katie Walsh at Los Angeles Times called her presence "empathetic". LeGear has supporting roles in the Lifetime films Killer Caregiver and Killer Contractor, guest starred in Veronica Mars and co-directed a short film called Capture.

== Stage credits ==
Year	Title	Role	Location	Notes
2001	The History of Tom Jones, a Foundling	—N/a	Vista High School, Vista, California	High school performance
2001	The Legend of Sleepy Hollow	Woman in White	Encore Youth Theater, Vista, California	
2003	Annie	Lily	Moonlight Youth Theatre, Vista, California	
2007	A Midsummer Night's Dream	Puck	Schoenberg Hall, Los Angeles, California	
2008	The Medium	Mrs. Nolan	Schoenberg Hall, Los Angeles, California	
2008	The Legend of Sleepy Hollow		Encore Youth Theater, Vista, California	Director
2008	The Threepenny Opera	Lucy (matinee) / Whore	Los Angeles Theater Center, Los Angeles, California	
2009	Music and Memories	Angel	Welk Resorts Theatre, Escondido, California	
2010	The Pirates of Penzance	Mabel	Welk Resorts Theatre, Escondido, California	
2010	The House of Yes	Lesly	Compass Theatre, San Diego, California	
2010	Into the Woods	Rapunzel	New Village Arts Theatre, Carlsbad, California	
2011	The Phantom of the Opera	Christine Daaé	McKinney Theatre, Mission Viejo, California	
2011	Phantom	Carlotta	Candlelight Pavilion, Claremont, California	
2011	Man of La Mancha	Antonia	Welk Resorts Theatre, Escondido, California	
2012	Man of La Mancha	Antonia	Carpenter Performing Arts Center, Long Beach, California	Musical Theatre West
2014	Les Misérables	Cosette	Arkansas Repertory Theatre, Little Rock, Arkansas	
2014	Les Misérables	Cosette	The Phoenix Theatre, Phoenix, Arizona	
2015	Gianni Schicchi	Nella	Cowell Theater, San Francisco, California	Merola Opera Program
2016	On The Twentieth Century	Imelda Thornton	Los Angeles Theatre, Los Angeles, California	

== Filmography ==
Feature films
Year	Title	Role	Notes
2012	The Kult	Natasha Snow	
2017	Carving a Life	Lauren	
2018	Killer Caregiver	Patty	Lifetime TV Movie
2018	The Calling	Holly Jensen	
2018	Christmas Harmony	Pamela	Lifetime TV Movie
2019	Killer Contractor	Claire	Lifetime TV Movie
2022	Starf*cker	Karen	

Short films
Year	Title	Role	Actor	Director	Producer
2015	The Recency Effect	Trixy	Yes	No	Yes
2016	Remember Me	Leslie	Yes	No	Co-producer
2016	Valhalla	Naomi King	Yes	No	No
2017	Refuge	Diane	Yes	No	No
2017	Jordan Hates the Writing	Marilyn Monroe	Yes	No	No
2017	One Good Day	Diana	Yes	No	No
2019	Capture	Dana	Co-director	Yes	Co-producer
2019	In the Absence of Eden	Kalissa 'Lissy'	Co-director	Yes	Yes
2021	Moving Out	Joanne	Yes	No	Executive

== Accolades ==
Event	Year	Award	Title	Result	Ref.
GI Film Festival San Diego	2017	Best Actress	Refuge	Nominated	
Idyllwild International Festival of Cinema	2018	Best Actress Feature Film	Carving a Life	Nominated	
Idyllwild International Festival of Cinema	2018	Best Ensemble Cast Feature Film	Carving a Life	Nominated	
Horrible Imaginings Film Festival	2020	Best Home Grown Local Film	Capture	Won	
