= Flight Command =

- Theatrical release poster
- Directed by: Frank Borzage
- Written by: Harvey S. Haislip (story and screenplay); John Sutherland (story); Wells Root (screenplay)
- Produced by: J. Walter Ruben; Frank Borzage (uncredited)
- Starring: Robert Taylor; Ruth Hussey; Walter Pidgeon
- Cinematography: Harold Rosson
- Edited by: Robert Kern
- Music by: Franz Waxman
- Production company: Metro-Goldwyn-Mayer
- Distributed by: Loew's Inc.
- Release date: December 27, 1940
- Running time: 115 minutes
- Country: United States
- Language: English
- Budget: $837,000
- Box office: $2,292,000

Flight Command is a 1940 American U.S. Navy film from MGM, produced by Frank Borzage and directed by J. Walter Ruben and Frank Borzage (uncredited), starring Robert Taylor, Ruth Hussey, and Walter Pidgeon. It has the distinction of often being credited as the first Hollywood film glorifying the American military to be released after the outbreak of World War II in Europe, a year before the U.S. entered the conflict.

== Plot ==
Hotshot ensign Alan Drake, fresh from flight school at Pensacola, Florida, gets off to a bad start with the pilots of an elite Fighting 8 squadron (VF-8), nicknamed the "Hellcats", to which he has been posted in San Diego. Making a nearly disastrous landing attempt in heavy fog against orders and disqualifying the squadron during a competitive shooting exercise by colliding with the target drogue does not endear him to his fellow pilots. He also asks out a woman he has met, Lorna, not knowing that she is the squadron commander Billy Gary's wife.

However, Drake is earnest and contrite. He mixes with the Hellcats at the Garys' large house, which the sociable couple have opened as an unofficial officers' club. His flying and his social errors are forgiven, and his fellow pilots accept him, nicknaming him "Pensacola".

Drake further proves himself when he helps Lieutenant Jerry Banning solve a problem in a blind-landing apparatus he is developing. Just after Commander Gary is sent out of town on assignment, Banning decides the apparatus is ready to test in fog — but it fails and Banning is killed. Working with Banning's assistant, Drake soon identifies the problem, but no further testing is allowed until Commander Gary's return.

Banning is the brother of Lorna Gary. She sinks into a deep depression. She also knows that Gary will expect her to hide her feelings and carry on, something that is very much not in her nature. Drake, appreciating the help the Garys gave him when he arrived, visits her at her home, and convinces her she should not suffer alone. They go for walks, drives, and tennis; he amuses her with jokes. Finally, at a restaurant she reaches for his hand and in doing so realizes she is falling for him. She quickly breaks away, and says she cannot see him any more.

As soon as her husband returns, she tells him she needs to leave him for a while. She explains that she cannot again hide her feelings and carry on after a tragedy, as he expects. He is surprised, and says she should have said so before. Not mentioning Drake, she also says that she has changed. He tells her to leave if she must, but that he still loves her and hopes she will come back to him, but only if she loves him.

Because Drake and Lorna were seen together, and Lorna went away shortly after, Lieutenant Commander Dusty Rhodes and the squadron confront Drake, accusing him of trying to take Lorna from Gary. Out of respect for her privacy, Drake says nothing. But he is extremely offended that they would accuse him of this, and files a letter of resignation. Commander Gary tries to discourage him, but reluctantly puts it through channels. While waiting for a response, they participate in an emergency search and rescue, during which Gary's engine fails, and he is badly injured in a crash-landing. Drake acts against orders, and goes to his rescue. Learning that San Diego is fogged in, he arranges to use Banning's equipment to land, and then removes his radio and places Gary in the tail of the plane. Drake then uses the new equipment to lead his group of five down through the fog to a safe landing.

In response to a telegram about Gary's crash, Lorna Gary returns to San Diego and visits her husband in the hospital. Rhodes witnesses her praying for him, their tearful reunion, and her promise to come home. Rhodes tells Drake that his resignation has been turned down, and apologizes to Drake for his behavior. But, Drake is still angry and says he will get a transfer. Mugger Martin says, "Come on Pensacola, give in!" and the rest of the squadron urge him to stay. He agrees.

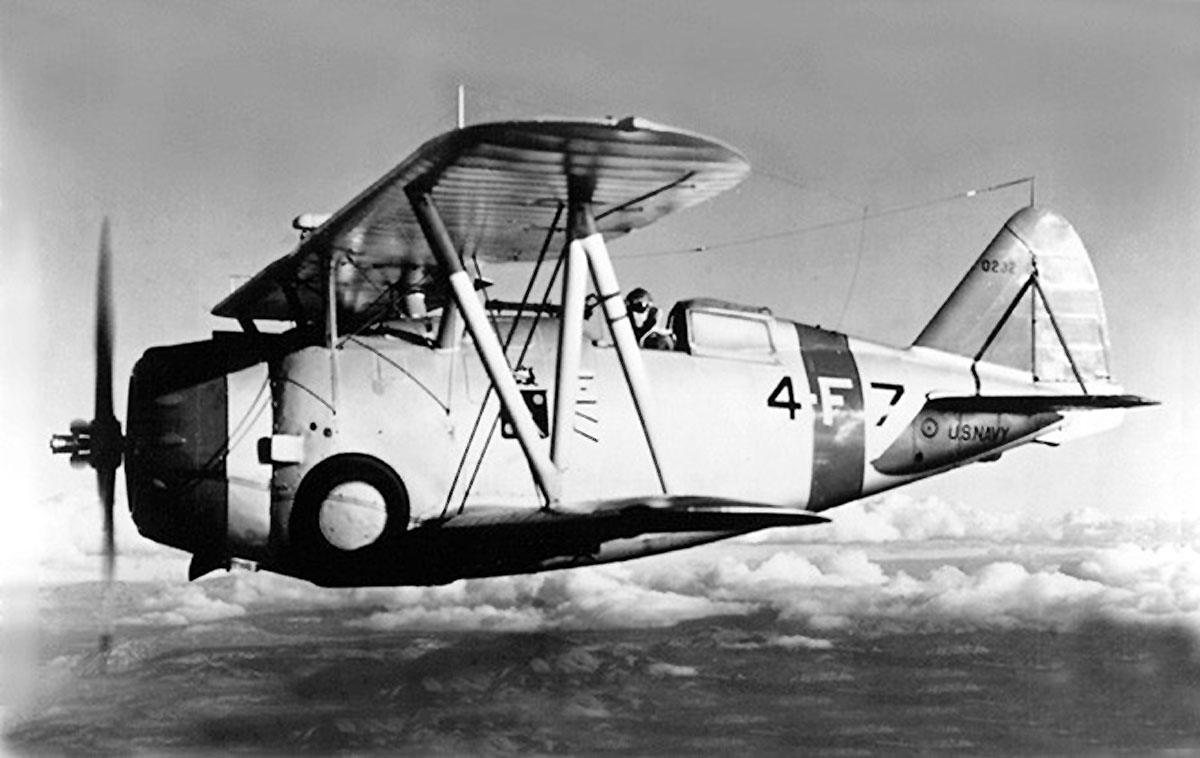
Although operational in 1940, the Grumman F3F series was obsolete by the time the US entered World War II.

== Cast ==
- Robert Taylor as Ensign Alan Drake
- Ruth Hussey as Lorna Gary
- Walter Pidgeon as Squadron Commander Billy Gary
- Paul Kelly as Lieutenant Commander "Dusty" Rhodes
- Shepperd Strudwick as Lieutenant Jerry Banning
- Red Skelton as Lieutenant "Mugger" Martin
- Nat Pendleton as C.P.O. "Spike" Knowles
- Dick Purcell as Lieutenant "Stitchy" Payne
- William Tannen as Lieutenant Freddy Townsend
- William Stelling as Lieutenant Bush
- Stanley Smith as Lieutenant Frost
- Addison Richards as Vice Admiral
- Donald Douglas as 1st Duty Officer
- Pat Flaherty as 2nd Duty Officer
- Forbes Murray as Captain
- Marsha Hunt as Claire
- Lee Tung Foo as Jung (The Gary's Servant) (uncredited)
- Reed Hadley as Admiral's Aide (uncredited)
- Gayne Whitman as Doctor (uncredited)
- John Hamilton as Pensacola Commander (uncredited)

== Production ==
Flight Command had impressive aerial scenes due to the full cooperation of the US Navy, with the loan of VF-6 squadron, flying Grumman F3F biplanes. Noted film pilot and aerial sequence director Paul Mantz was the "air boss" on the production, in charge of all the flying scenes. The USS Enterprise based in California and operating during maneuvers off Hawaii, also featured prominently in the production. The setting of the film is Naval Air Station North Island.

Taylor was especially busy in 1940, with three films in production. He also starred in MGM's Escape and Waterloo Bridge. (Note: Taylor was caught up in the excitement of flying and obtained his own flying license as a result. During World War II, he served as a US Navy flying instructor.)

== Reception ==
Flight Command was received as a mild attempt to bolster patriotic spirits, but as Bosley Crowther of The New York Times observed, the film had some obvious strengths as well as annoying encumbrances."... as usual in these big flying pictures, the actual air shots are beautiful— the scenes of planes flying in tight formations above the majestic clouds, dropping away in screaming power dives, taking off and landing on a carrier's deck. Then you feel it really has wings. Otherwise, 'Flight Command' is just a routine adventure film— exciting for the youngsters, no doubt, but rather pulpy for a grown-up's taste."

According to MGM records, the film earned $1,445,000 in the US and Canada and $847,000 elsewhere resulting in a profit of $707,000.

== Nominations ==
A. Arnold Gillespie and Douglas Shearer were nominated for the Oscar for Best Special Effects.

== See also ==
- List of media set in San Diego
