= Sarah Landon and the Paranormal Hour =

- Theatrical release poster
- Directed by: Lisa Comrie
- Written by: John Comrie
- Produced by: Andrew Cohen
- Starring: Rissa Walters; Brian Comrie; Dan Comrie; Jane Harris
- Cinematography: Andrew Kuepper
- Edited by: Andrew Cohen
- Music by: Joseph Conlan
- Distributed by: Freestyle Releasing
- Release date: October 19, 2007
- Running time: 81 minutes
- Country: United States
- Language: English
- Box office: $858,415

Sarah Landon and the Paranormal Hour is a 2007 American supernatural thriller film starring Rissa Walters, Brian Comrie (in his only film appearance before his death), Dan Comrie and Jane Harris. It was released on October 19, 2007 by Freestyle Releasing. It is billed as "the first in a series of Sarah Landon Mysteries".

== Plot ==
After the death of her close childhood friend, 17-year-old Sarah Landon (Rissa Walters) goes to visit her friend's grandmother, Thelma Shaw (Jane Harris), in the small town of Pine Valley, California. Upon arriving in Pine Valley, Sarah's car starts making strange noises, and she stops at the repair shop. While there, she talks with the owner and learns of a story involving a local family and asks Mrs. Shaw to get the full story. As the story goes, a young man named David Baker (Brian Comrie), who lives in Pine Valley, will be killed by his deceased uncle on his 21st birthday, which is that coming Monday.

David's uncle, Ben Woods (Rusty Hanes), was angry with his sister because of her involvement in the car crash that killed his own son, Johnny, on his 21st birthday. After receiving the threat as a child and learning of his uncle's death, David became obsessed with the paranormal, trying to find out how Ben would kill him. He became a recluse, moving to a loft above the family's barn. Sarah and Matt (Dan Comrie), David's brother, try to help him before his birthday arrives, though initially Matt doesn't believe that his brother will really die. At first, David believes Ben was reincarnated, and that a boy who moved next door to the Bakers, Justin Van Kamp (Kendell Linley), will murder him.

After encountering Ben's spirit in the man's former home, he realizes Ben is still a spirit and will instead possess someone else to kill him. As it grows closer to midnight (the paranormal hour) on David's 21st birthday, Sarah, Matt, and David, with the help of a local psychic's niece named Yolanda Lopez (Sylvia Enrique), uncover a ritual that may save David's life. At midnight, they begin the ritual, and when Matt and Sarah return to Mrs. Shaw's house, they find out that Mrs. Shaw is the person who was possessed by the spirit of Ben Woods. The two teens race back to the Bakers' home, with Mrs. Shaw/Ben in close pursuit.

Just as the possessed woman is about to kill David, Justin van Kamp appears, and it is revealed that he is actually the reincarnation of Ben's son, Johnny. Johnny convinces his father not to kill David, and Ben's spirit moves on. Later that day, Sarah returns home to San Diego, saying that this adventure was only the beginning of strange occurrences in Pine Valley, hinting at a possible sequel.

== Cast ==
- Rissa Walters as Sarah Landon
- Alessandra Daniele as Young Sarah Landon
- Brian Comrie as David Baker
- Dan Comrie as Matt Baker
- Rusty Hanes as Ben Woods
- Rick Comrie as Johnny Woods
- Michael A. Evans as Lee Baker
- Nicole Des Coteaux as Mary Ann Baker
- Sylvia Enrique as Frida
- Jane Harris as Thelma Shaw
- Dave Lindley as Ron
- Kendell Lindley as Justin Van Camp
- Dakota Jade as Young Megan

== Production ==
Principal photography took place in San Diego County at a house in Fallbrook. Additional filming took place in Pine Valley where the movie is set.

== Home media ==
The DVD's initial release date was March 25, 2008, but the release was postponed due to the movie's failure at the box office. However, the movie was finally released on DVD on September 9, 2008.

== Box office ==
The film opened in 1,121 theaters in the United States and grossed $586,283 on its opening weekend. Brandon Gray of Box Office Mojo wrote that it and The Ten Commandments had "two of the worst national debuts of all time". The film ended up grossing a total of $858,415.

== Reception ==
Sarah Landon and the Paranormal Hour was widely panned by critics. On Rotten Tomatoes, the film has an approval rating of 0% based on 12 reviews, with an average rating of 2.9/10. Criticisms were directed towards the acting, dialogue and cinematography, with John Anderson of Variety writing that the film is "beset by bad lighting, limited visual imagination and acting so wooden it might have termites." Andy Webster of The New York Times stated that "the film is sunk by a pervasive stasis, the byproduct not of mood but of the filmmakers' amateurish abilities. If there's one thing Nick and Disney know, it's that youthful entertainment needs to keep moving." Ty Burr of The Boston Globe was also critical, writing "the ear-numbing dialogue explains (and explains) rather than dramatizes, though, and the performances are earnest and flat".

The protagonist Sarah Landon was also criticized, with Jim Ridley of LA Weekly stating that "Do-nothing Sarah may be the dullest, most featureless and inactive protagonist in recent movies -- great news for those Scooby-Doo die-hards who never got enough Freddy."

== Cancelled sequel ==
Although the director signed up for a sequel, and the movie was billed as 'the first in a series of Sarah Landon mysteries', there have been no plans for a sequel due to the poor box office performance of the first film.

== See also ==
- List of media set in San Diego
