= Mighty Oak =

2020 American film by Sean McNamara

- Theatrical release poster
- Directed by: Sean McNamara
- Screenplay by: Matt R. Allen
- Story by: Frank Ragen; Matt R. Allen
- Produced by: Frank Ragen; David Brookwell; Sean McNamara
- Starring: Janel Parrish; Alexa PenaVega; Carlos PenaVega; Raven-Symoné; Levi Dylan; Tommy Ragen
- Cinematography: Robert Hayes
- Edited by: Maysie Hoy; Matt Michael
- Music by: John Coda
- Production company: Brookwell McNamara Entertainment
- Distributed by: Paramount Pictures
- Release date: June 5, 2020
- Running time: 102 minutes
- Country: United States
- Language: English

Mighty Oak is a 2020 American comedy-drama musical film directed by Sean McNamara.

== Plot ==
A young guitarist, reminiscent of a late vocalist, joins a musical band which leads to theories of reincarnation.

== Cast ==
- Janel Parrish as Gina Jackson
- Alexa PenaVega as Valerie Scoggins
- Carlos PenaVega as Pedro
- Raven-Symoné as Taylor Lazlo
- Levi Dylan as Vaughn Jackson
- Tommy Ragen as Oak Scoggins
- Ben Milliken as Darby
- Rodney Hicks as Dwayne Biggs

== Production ==
Most of the film was shot in Ocean Beach and other parts of San Diego.

== Reception ==
On the review aggregator website Rotten Tomatoes, 52% of 21 critics' reviews are positive, with an average rating of 5.7/10.

Philip Martin of Arkansas Democrat-Gazette gave it an 80 out of 100, stating "It's sunny and wistful; something to go see if that's what you need right now."

Nick Allen at RogerEbert.com scored it a 1.5 out of 4 and said "This premise would excel far better, and go much deeper with its targeted themes, in something like a dark comedy; that Mighty Oak embraces this delusion with no sarcasm and a lot of wish fulfillment is at the very least worrisome."

== See also ==
- List of media set in San Diego
