= Sara Wolfkind =

American actress

- Occupation: Actress
- Years active: 2013–present
- Known for: Grimcutty; Love All You Have Left

Sara Wolfkind is an American actress known for Grimcutty (2022) and for her portrayal of Anne Frank in Love All You Have Left (2017).

== Career ==
While living in University City, San Diego, in 2013, Wolfkind portrayed the White Rabbit in North Coast Repertory Theatre's production of Disney's Alice in Wonderland in Solana Beach, California and was nominated for Outstanding Supporting Actress (Junior Division) by the National Youth Arts Awards. Later that year, she was an assistant director on NCR's production of The Diary of Anne Frank. In 2017, Wolfkind was cast as Anne Frank in Love All You Have Left through Facebook auditions.

=== Grimcutty ===
In 2022, Wolfkind starred in the Hulu original horror film Grimcutty. In an interview with UPI, Wolfkind talked about the relation to her character because her own parents didn't understand how the internet works. While critics on the whole were not kind to the film, some individual reviews highlighted Wolfkind's performance. Rob Price at Comic Watch said she was a "bit uneven in her performance, for the most part she was good, but there were times she just didn’t seem genuine." In a positive review of the film, Clement Tyler Obropta at Film Inquiry wrote that "Wolfkind plays the hell out of the role. She’s got bottomless reserves of pathos, and [writer-director John] Ross even trusts her to give a final ASMR address to the audience at the end of the picture. She’s the latest in a line of amazing young actresses emerging in Hollywood, many of whom got their start in horror: Wolfkind stands shoulder-to-shoulder in Grimcutty with Amber Midthunder in Prey, Jenna Ortega in X and Scream, Devery Jacobs in Rhymes for Young Ghouls and Blood Quantum, Anya Taylor-Joy in The Witch and Split, and Blu Hunt in The New Mutants — a legion of Gen Z Final Girls."

== Filmography ==
Year	Title	Role	Notes
2013	The Playing Ground	Sara Holloway	Short Film
2014	Year of the Snake	Sam	Short Film
2017	Unbreakable Bond	Maria	
2017	Impromptu	Trisha	Short Film
2017	Love All You Have Left	Anne Frank	
2018	HR 805	Jazmin	TV movie
2019	Kid Fix	Vera	TV movie
2020	Don't Fear the Dead	Alex	Short Film
2021	From Under the Bridge: When Bullies Become Trolls	Stacey Brown	Short Film
2022	Grimcutty	Asha Chaudhry	
