= The Dark Resurgence: A Star Wars Story =

2018 film by Michael McCumber

- Poster
- Directed by: Michael McCumber
- Written by: Michael McCumber
- Starring: Daniel Sosa Porter; Christopher Szabo; Kayla Sweet; Gerren Hall; Erik Cram
- Cinematography: Michael McCumber; Mike Peterson
- Edited by: Michael McCumber
- Music by: Adam Hooper
- Production company: Mike The Marine
- Distributed by: YouTube
- Release date: April 10, 2018
- Running time: 13 minutes
- Country: United States
- Language: English

The Dark Resurgence: A Star Wars Story is a 2018 Star Wars fan film written and directed by Michael McCumber. The film stars Daniel Sosa Porter, Christopher Szabo, Kayla Sweet, Gerren Hall and Erik Cram.

== Plot ==
A Sith Lord emerges during the fall of the Galactic Empire.

== Cast ==
- Daniel Sosa Porter
- Christopher Szabo
- Kayla Sweet
- Gerren Hall
- Erik Cram

== Production ==
Principal photography took place on Mount Laguna in San Diego County.

== Release ==
The film premiered on April 10, 2018, at University of California, San Diego and was released on YouTube on May 4, 2018. On September 28, 2018, it screened at the Museum of Photographic Arts as part of GI Film Festival San Diego.

== Reception ==
=== Critical response ===
Alex Hernandez at Techaeris called it "impressive." Chloe Esser at UCSD Guardian and Richard Propes at The Independent Critic rated it a B+. Trenton Bowser at Project Louder said it is "a fantastic fan film."

Accolades
List of awards and nominations
Festival	Year	Award	Recipient(s)	Result	Ref.
Azure Lorica's Fan Film Awards	2019	Best Actor	Christopher Szabo	Nominated	
Azure Lorica's Fan Film Awards	2019	Best Actress	Kayla Sweet	Nominated	
San Diego Film Awards	2019	Best Fight Choreography	Michael McCumber	Won	
San Diego Film Awards	2019	Best Visual Effects: Narrative Short Film	Annie Caps-Wightman, Michael McCumber, Roman Shcherbakov	Nominated	
San Diego Film Awards	2019	Best Costume: Narrative Short Film	Rosalie Barrio, Kristen Guerra	Nominated	
San Diego Film Awards	2019	Best Sound Design: Narrative Short Film	Michael McCumber	Nominated	
Austin Indie Fest	2018	Best Fan Film	The Dark Resurgence	Won	
GI Film Festival San Diego	2018	Best Film Made By or Starring Veterans or Military	Michael McCumber	Nominated	
GI Film Festival San Diego	2018	Local Film Showcase: Best Actor	Christopher Szabo	Nominated	
GI Film Festival San Diego	2018	Local Film Showcase: Best Actress	Kayla Sweet	Nominated	
GI Film Festival San Diego	2018	Local Film Showcase: Best Student Film	The Dark Resurgence	Nominated	
GI Film Festival San Diego	2018	Local Choice Award	The Dark Resurgence	Nominated	
