= The Last Ride (2004 film) =

2004 American television film

- DVD cover
- Genre: Action drama; Crime thriller
- Screenplay by: Ron McGee
- Story by: Rob Cohen; Ron McGee
- Directed by: Guy Norman Bee
- Starring: Dennis Hopper; Will Patton; Chris Carmack; Nadine Velazquez; Fred Ward
- Music by: Frankie Blue Sposato
- Country of origin: United States
- Original language: English

Production
- Executive producers: Rob Cohen; Angela Mancuso; Bruce Mellon
- Producer: Oscar Luis Costo
- Cinematography: Karl Herrmann
- Editors: Sean Albertson; Jonathan Del Gatto
- Running time: 81 minutes
- Production companies: Stu Segall Productions; Nowita Productions

Original release
- Network: USA Network
- Release: June 2, 2004

The Last Ride is a 2004 American action drama television film directed by Guy Norman Bee and starring Dennis Hopper, Will Patton, Chris Carmack, Nadine Velazquez and Fred Ward. The story for the film was written by Rob Cohen, well known for directing another automotive action film, The Fast and the Furious (2001).

The movie premiered on June 2, 2004, on the USA Network and, at the time of its release, was primarily used by General Motors to market the new Pontiac GTO. During late 2004 and early 2005, it was also released in several countries outside the United States, mostly as a straight-to-DVD movie.

== Plot ==
In 1970, Ronnie Purnell is caught at the California–Mexico border after a robbery and sentenced to over 30 years in prison. During the police chase, Purnell's wife tragically loses her life, leaving their son Aaron to be raised by, California Highway Patrol Officer Darryl Kurtz. Decades later, when Ronnie is released, he becomes determined to seek revenge against Darryl. Meanwhile, Aaron is now a police officer and has disowned his father and has nothing to do with him. However, Aaron's son, Matthew, is a San Diego street racer, is very interested in his grandfather's exciting past. To help Ronnie, Matthew joins Ronnie in searching for his old car, a 1969 Pontiac GTO Judge, which contains a key to a safe that may contain evidence that can put Darryl behind bars.

== Cast ==
- Dennis Hopper as Ronnie Purnell
- Will Patton as Aaron Purnell
- Chris Carmack as Matthew Purnell
- Fred Ward as Darryl Kurtz
- Nadine Velazquez as J.J. Cruz
- Peter Onorati as Burt Walling

== Production ==
Rob Cohen came up with the idea for the film while directing commercials for the 2004 Pontiac GTO. Filming took place in San Diego.

== See also ==
- List of media set in San Diego
