= Love All You Have Left =

2017 film by Matt Sivertson

- Poster
- Directed by: Matt Sivertson
- Written by: Matt Sivertson
- Produced by: Caroline Amiguet; Matt Sivertson; Kimberly Wall
- Starring: Caroline Amiguet; Sara Wolfkind; Michael Christopher Shantz; Mike Burnell; Kathleen Sheehy
- Cinematography: William Wall
- Edited by: Matt Sivertson
- Music by: Steve Garbade
- Production company: Dongo Productions
- Distributed by: Indie Rights
- Release date: 2017
- Running time: 90 minutes
- Country: United States
- Language: English

Love All You Have Left is a 2017 drama film written and directed by Matt Sivertson. The film stars Caroline Amiguet, Sara Wolfkind, Michael Christopher Shantz, Mike Burnell and Kathleen Sheehy. The story depicts Anne Frank surviving in the attic of a grieving family.

== Plot ==
After losing her daughter in a school shooting, a woman finds a girl in her attic who claims she is Anne Frank.

== Cast ==
- Caroline Amiguet as Juliette Forster
- Sara Wolfkind as Anne Frank
- Michael Christopher Shantz as Jeff Forster
- Mike Burnell as Nazi Soldier
- Kathleen Sheehy as Melanie Forster

== Production ==
Much of the principal photography took place at the director's home in Pacific Beach, San Diego. The story was influenced by Sivertson and Amiguet's visit to the Anne Frank House. In an interview with San Diego Reader, Sivertson said inspiration was discovered from the album In the Aeroplane Over the Sea by Neutral Milk Hotel. It contained references to Anne Frank and the songwriter felt haunted by her after reading The Diary of Anne Frank.

== Release ==
The film screened at the Museum of Photographic Arts and San Diego Jewish Film Festival before a theatrical release in Los Angeles. It was distributed by Indie Rights.

== Reception ==
San Diego Reader said "this is basically a two-hander." An article by The Forward, Talya Zax claims the idea of Anne Frank surviving is overdone. Kimber Myers at Los Angeles Times says "the issue isn't the lack of money; it's the choices made by the filmmakers."
