= Ken Kuhlken =

American writer (born 1945)

- Born: Kenneth Wayne Kuhlken; September 4, 1945; San Diego, CA
- Died: July 29, 2024; San Diego, CA
- Education: BA, San Diego State University MFA, University of Iowa
- Occupation: Novelist
- Children: Darcy (Kuhlken) Mentone, Cody Kuhlken, Zoe Kuhlken
- Writing career
- Genre: Fiction
- Notable works: Midheaven; The Loud Adios; The Do-Re-Mi
- Notable awards: Ernest Hemingway Award, Shamus Award, St Martin's Best First PI Novel, San Diego Book Award
- Website: www.kenkuhlken.net

Ken Kuhlken was born and grew up in San Diego, played semi-pro baseball in Tijuana, and attended San Diego State University, first as a philosophy and then as an English major. After college, he wrote, played guitar and sang in a rock and blues band, and taught high school, before relocating to attend the University of Iowa Writers’ Workshop.

His stories have appeared in Esquire and dozens of other magazines and anthologies, been honorably mentioned in Best American Short Stories, and earned a National Endowment for the Arts Fellowship.

During the 1980s, his fascination with novels of crime, punishment, and redemption, led him to conceive of the Hickey family series, which he continues to write. He has also been a frequent contributor of fiction and feature articles and a columnist for the San Diego Reader.

He has taught creative writing at the University of Arizona; California State University, Chico; and San Diego State University. With his wife Pam, he founded Perelandra College, which he serves as president and chair of Creative Writing.

== Novels ==
- Midheaven, (1980) finalist for the Ernest Hemingway Award for best first novel
- The Loud Adios, (1989) Private Eye Writers of America Best First Mystery Novel
- The Venus Deal (1991)
- The Angel Gang (1993)
- The Do-Re-Mi (2006) Shamus Award finalist
- The Vagabond Virgins (2008)
- "The Biggest Liar in Los Angeles" (2010)
