= Riley (film) =

2023 film by Benjamin Howard

- Theatrical poster
- Directed by: Benjamin Howard
- Written by: Benjamin Howard
- Produced by: Tommy Anderson; Benjamin Howard; Laura Scarano
- Starring: Jake Holley; Colin McCalla; Riley Quinn Scott; Connor Storrie; Rib Hillis
- Cinematography: Michael Elias Thomas
- Edited by: Benjamin Howard
- Music by: Jerik Centeno
- Production companies: Charthouse; Windsor Film Company
- Distributed by: Dark Star Pictures
- Release dates: September 24, 2023 (Calgary International Film Festival); January 14, 2025 (VOD)
- Running time: 93 minutes
- Country: United States
- Language: English

Riley is a 2023 American coming-of-age drama film written and directed by Benjamin Howard in his feature film debut. The film stars Jake Holley, Colin McCalla, Riley Quinn Scott, Connor Storrie and Rib Hillis. The story follows a closeted high-school football player struggling to accept his identity.

The film is inspired by Howard's experience as a student athlete and was filmed on location in San Diego, California. It screened at the Calgary International Film Festival, the BFI Flare: London LGBTIQ+ Film Festival, and was distributed by Dark Star Pictures.

Critics generally responded positively to the film, praising its message and realism while noting that it does not introduce anything new. Riley received several accolades during its film festival run.

== Plot ==
Dakota Riley is a star wide receiver and rising senior at Middleton High School in suburban San Diego, living under intense pressure from his father, the school's head football coach, to secure a college scholarship. Though he presents himself as heterosexual, Riley privately struggles with his attraction to other boys, particularly his quarterback and best friend, Jaeden Galloway.

While dating a classmate, Skylar, Riley grows increasingly conflicted about his identity. His friendship with openly gay classmate Liam prompts him to confront his feelings, placing strain on his relationship with Skylar and creating tension within his social circle. As Riley navigates secrecy, guilt, and fear of damaging his football future, his internal conflict begins to affect his behavior both on and off the field.

After a series of emotional confrontations and misunderstandings, Riley starts to accept his sexuality. He comes out to Skylar, and the two part amicably. Jaeden reassures Riley of his support and agrees to keep his secret. Before a crucial rivalry game, Riley sees Skylar and Liam in the crowd and delivers a motivational speech to his teammates, signaling a growing sense of self-acceptance despite the pressures he still faces.

== Cast ==
- Jake Holley as Dakota Riley
- Colin McCalla as Jaeden Galloway
- Riley Quinn Scott as Skylar Braxton
- Connor Storrie as Liam Hauser
- Rib Hillis as Carson Riley
- J.B. Waterman as 'Obi Wan' Hookup
- René Ashton as Miriam Riley
- Marcus Winchester-Jones as Desmond
- Nigel Siwabessy as Hector
- Dallas Perry as Caleb Mitchell
- Alyssa Latson as Courtney
- Caroline Amiguet as Madame Dupont / French Teacher
- Kaleti Williams as Coach Drey

== Production ==
Riley was Benjamin Howard's feature film debut and it was inspired by his experiences as a student athlete. Howard, who is from East County, San Diego, said many sequences were filmed in places formative to his upbringing, including Mt. Helix Park. It was crowdfunded through Seed&Spark and was filmed in April 2022.

Howard described the range of colors in the film as a reflection of multiple character emotions and experiences. Shades of blue and light gray were used when Riley felt happy, while neutral and warmer tones mirrored his unfavorable or gloomy feelings.

== Release ==
Riley held its world premiere at Calgary International Film Festival on September 24, 2023. The American premiere took place at Bend Film Festival in Bend, Oregon. It later screened at San Diego Film Week, Sedona International Film Festival, San Luis Obispo International Film Festival, and Florida Film Festival.

In 2024, it screened at BFI Flare: London LGBTIQ+ Film Festival. It was released on video on demand on January 14, 2025, and was distributed by Dark Star Pictures.

It is also available in Asia on GagaOOLala.

== Reception ==
=== Critical response ===
Vidal Dcosta of The Movie Buff gave the film an A+ and wrote that it "excels at tackling multiple issues that plague the protagonist" both on and off the field. Ris Fatah of Queerguru wrote that "Howard's feature-length drama is an impressive, authentic debut." Neil Baker at Cinerama Film praised the screenplay as it "captures a realism rarely seen in coming-out movies."

Rich Cline of Shadows on the Wall rated it 4 out of 5, saying "as the drama gets increasingly serious, the film grabs hold powerfully. So even if things begin to turn a bit melodramatic, there's truth in the way the story plays out." Cline also wrote that "there's nothing particularly new here, as these themes are frequently explored on-screen."

Josh Winning of Radio Times rated it 3 out of 5, writing that it "does hit a lot of the expected beats of a gay coming-out story." He added that "it makes up for any lack of originality with its sincere and beautifully shot exploration of young people figuring out their place in the world."

=== Accolades ===
Festival	Year	Award	Recipient(s)	Result	Ref.
NewFilmmakers Los Angeles	2024	Best Feature Film	Riley	Won	
Riverside International Film Festival	2024	Audience Favorite	Benjamin Howard	Won	
Riverside International Film Festival	2024	Founder's Award	Benjamin Howard	Won	
Woods Hole Film Festival	2024	Feature Narrative – Drama	Benjamin Howard	Won	
