= Murder and Cocktails =

2024 film by Henry Barrial

- Release poster
- Directed by: Henry Barrial
- Written by: Ron Jackson
- Produced by: Ron Jackson
- Starring: Jason Bernardo; Jessicah Neufeld; Colleen O'Shaughnessey; Ricardo Molina; Lucy Boryer; Brian Lally; Nerissa Tedesco; Caroline Amiguet; Jeff Nimoy
- Cinematography: John Paul DeFazio
- Edited by: Jill D'Agnenica
- Music by: Archie Thompson
- Production company: 905 Productions
- Distributed by: Vision Films
- Release date: January 23, 2024 (VOD)
- Running time: 89 minutes
- Country: United States
- Language: English
- Budget: $75,000

Murder and Cocktails, also known as Cocktails with Nick and Lana, is a 2024 American murder mystery film directed by Henry Barrial and written by Ron Jackson. The film stars Jason Bernardo, Jessicah Neufeld, Colleen O'Shaughnessey, Ricardo Molina and Lucy Boryer.

== Plot ==
Murder and Cocktails follows Nick and Lana, a financially struggling couple living in a Los Angeles apartment complex who livestream their daily lives online. After one of their neighbors is found dead, the police investigation quickly stalls, prompting the couple to conduct their own informal inquiry. Disguised as friendly cocktail gatherings, Nick and Lana invite fellow residents into their apartment to socialize, subtly question them, and observe their behavior. As the evenings progress, hidden resentments and personal conflicts among the neighbors surface, while the couple’s relationship becomes increasingly strained by obsession, public attention, and the ethics of turning a tragedy into entertainment.

The murderer is revealed to be Rosie, a quiet and outwardly friendly neighbor who had developed an intense fixation on Lana. Rosie’s actions are motivated by obsessive jealousy: she idolized Lana's confidence and online persona while simultaneously resenting her perceived ease, warmth, and visibility. Feeling overlooked and inferior by comparison, Rosie’s admiration gradually transformed into hostility, ultimately leading her to commit the murder.

== Cast ==
- Jason Bernardo as Nick
- Jessicah Neufeld as Lana
- Colleen O'Shaughnessey as Sarah
- Ricardo Molina as Esteban
- Lucy Boryer as Rose
- Brian Lally as Sargent Russell
- Nerissa Tedesco as Bernice
- Caroline Amiguet as Maizie
- Jeff Nimoy as Peter Westbay
- Patrick Wolff as Sam Jones
- Thurman Dalrymple as Detective Barrett
- Alex Kip as William
- Mike Sears
- Christopher Botiller as Carl
- Jasmine M. Garcia as Fedlia

== Production ==
Jackson was inspired by Nick and Nora Charles in The Thin Man. Principal photography took place in Jackson's Little Italy, San Diego condominium. The film was made for $75,000.

== Release ==
The film was released on January 23, 2024, and was distributed by Vision Films.

== Reception ==
Bobby LePire at Film Threat scored the film a 9.5 out of 10. Mike Haberfelner at (Re)search My Trash said it is "a great watch, not only for whodunit fans." Rebecca Cherry at Film Carnage scored it 5 out of 10 and said the film "had a good idea but the execution lacks style."
