= Satan's Blade =

1984 American slasher film directed by L. Scott Castillo Junior

- Video cover art
- Directed by: L. Scott Castillo, Jr.
- Screenplay by: Thomas Cue
- Story by: L. Scott Castillo
- Starring: Stephanie Leigh Steel; Thomas Cue; Janeen Lowe
- Cinematography: Terry Kempf
- Edited by: Martin Jaquish
- Music by: Martin Jaquish
- Production company: M.C. Productions
- Release date: 1984
- Running time: 82 minutes
- Country: United States
- Language: English

Satan's Blade is a 1984 (Note: While filmed circa 1980, some sources note the film as a 1982 production; however, it was not released until 1984.) American slasher film directed by L. Scott Castillo Jr., and starring Tom Bongiorno, Stephanie Leigh Steel, and Thomas Cue. It follows two groups of people lodging at a mountain resort who are stalked by a mysterious killer potentially linked to a supernatural entity in the mountains.

Shot circa 1980 in Big Bear, California, Satan's Blade was released on VHS in 1985, and later received Blu-ray releases by Olive Films in the United States in 2015, and by Arrow Films in the United Kingdom in 2016.

== Plot ==
In November 1981, (Note: A calendar shown in the film's opening scene shows the film is set in November 1981.) a pair of female bank robbers, Ruth and Trish, make off with $50,000 after they kill two bank tellers in cold blood. They lay low at a snowy mountain cabin resort while waiting to rendezvous with their partner, George. As they wait, Ruth gets greedy and shoots Trish to death. She plans to do the same to George when he arrives, but she does not get the chance, as she is stabbed in the back by an unseen assailant while dragging her ex-partner's body. Ben, the local sheriff, and another officer arrive at the cabin after gunfire is reported, and discover the bodies.

The next day, two married couples arrive at the resort to celebrate one of the men's (Tony) graduation from law school and passing of the bar examination. Simultaneously, a group of college girls also arrive with a friend whose father has recently died. Despite being told of the murders and a local legend about a murderous mountain man who comes from the bottom of a nearby lake, the college girls decide to take the cabin, which is right next door to where the married couples are staying.

During the night, one of the young women has a nightmare of a man murdering her and everyone else. The following day, one of the college women, Stephanie, meets Tony on the lake, and the two talk. Stephanie ends up spending the afternoon with Tony, while her friends stay back at their cabin. That night, an unseen killer enters the girls' cabin and systematically stabs each of them to death.

Stephanie returns to the cabin later in the evening and discovers all of her friends have been murdered. She retreats to Tony and his friends' cabin, which the killer eventually breaches, murdering everyone inside except for Stephanie, who hides under a bed. The following morning, she emerges from the cabin and meets Deputy Sheriff "Ski", who embraces her before stabbing her in the stomach. When she asks him why, he admits that he simply wanted the money stowed in the cabin, and that he didn't want to hurt anyone; however, he alternately explains that he is possessed and brandishes a knife that is a talisman. Stephanie flees back into the cabin, but Ski follows, chasing her up the staircase, where he tackles her to the floor and stabs her to death. Afterwards, Ski throws the knife in the lake. The Sheriff arrives and calls Ski "George", revealing that Ski is the unseen accomplice of the bank robbers who appeared at the start of the film.

Later, a hand emerges from the lake and throws the knife back out, the blade sticking in the side of a tree. A man hiking through the woods notices the knife and dislodges it from the tree bark.

== Cast ==
- Tom Bongiorno as Tony
- Stephanie Leigh Steel as Stephanie
- Thomas Cue as Al
- Elisa R. Malinovitz as Lisa
- Janeen Lowe as Lil
- Ramona Andrada as Sue
- Diane Taylor as Rita
- Marti Neal as Marlene
- Susan Bennett as Mary
- Ski Mark Ford as Ski
- Fred Armond as Sheriff Ben
- Meg Greene as Ruth
- Mary Seamen as Trish
- Richard Taecker as Lodgekeeper Duncan Mackler
- Carrol Cotion as Lodgekeeper's Mother

== Production ==
Satan's Blade took director L. Scott Castillo Jr. years to finish and get released. The film was shot in Big Bear, California in the spring of 1980 over a period of 33 days. Some scenes were shot near San Diego in Julian, California.

== Release ==
=== Home media ===
Satan's Blade was first released on VHS in the United States by the Los Angeles-based home video distributor Prism Entertainment in 1984. It was released in 1985 on VHS through the Canadian distributor Galaxy Video. Diabolique Magazine stated that following the film's release, it "mostly existed as a forgotten relic of the VHS era."

Olive Films released Satan's Blade on Blu-ray and DVD in the United States on May 12, 2015. This release of the film runs 82 minutes in length.

In the United Kingdom, the film was submitted for approval by the British Board of Film Classification (BBFC) in 2016. This version approved by the BBFC was cut at 79 minutes. There, it subsequently received a Blu-ray and DVD combination release from Arrow Films, which runs approximately 83 minutes.

=== Critical response ===
In his book The Gorehound's Guide to Splatter Films of the 1980s, Scott Aaron Stine stated that "despite cut-rate acting, stilted dialogue, and sometimes-tedious direction, Satan's Blade is surprisingly engaging." His review concluded that the film was "pretty typical B-grade slasher fare, even though it's more representative of '70s horror than '80s fare." In Legacy of Blood: A Comprehensive Guide to Slasher Movies, Jim Harper notes: "Despite the promise of legendary creatures and supernatural goings-on, this is standard stalk'n'slash stuff, with plenty of point-of-view shots to (unsuccessfully) obscure the killer's identity."

Joe Yanick of Diabolique Magazine wrote: "Satan's Blade is firmly entrenched in a genre of so-bad-their-good films and it's hard to see how many would flock to this movie without a heavy veneer of irony. This is where the film is the most charming, however, because the film's many failures work in the viewer's favors." On a scale of 1 to 10, HorrorNews.net awarded the film a rating of 6/10. The reviewer noted the film's poor acting, audio, lighting, and film quality; but further stated, "unless you are a fan of old school low budget slasher films, this may not be the film for you. otherwise, it is a good example of the genre and the time period." Hysteria Lives! rated the film a negative 1.5 out of 5 stars, stating that although the film had its moments, it was essentially a zero budget copy of the first two Friday the 13th films.

== Sources ==
- Harper, Jim (2004). Legacy of Blood: A Comprehensive Guide to Slasher Movies. Manchester, England: Critical Vision. ISBN 978-1-900-48639-2.
- Stine, Scott Aaron (2003). The Gorehound's Guide to Splatter Films of the 1980s. Jefferson, North Carolina: McFarland. ISBN 978-0-786-41532-8.
