= Kung Fu Ghost =

2022 film by Jennifer N. Linch

- Poster
- Directed by: Jennifer N. Linch
- Written by: Ivan White
- Produced by: Jennifer N. Linch
- Starring: Jennifer N. Linch; Noah Sargent; Mark Atkinson; Amber Grayson; David S. Dawson; Whitney Wegman-Wood
- Cinematography: Jérôme Dolbert
- Edited by: Jennifer N. Linch
- Music by: Dyathon
- Production company: Nameless Productions
- Distributed by: Vision Films
- Release date: August 2, 2022
- Running time: 95 minutes
- Country: United States
- Language: English

Kung Fu Ghost is a 2022 action comedy film directed by Jennifer N. Linch in her feature directorial debut and written by Ivan White. The film stars Linch, Noah Sargent, Mark Atkinson, Amber Grayson and David S. Dawson. Kung Fu Ghost was released on August 2, 2022, by Vision Films.

== Plot ==
Daisy inherits a mysterious aged property from her late grandfather, a martial arts master whom she never met. When she shows up on the grounds, she finds the house is being haunted by ghosts. When burglars stumble into the estate, she calls on the spirits to put a stop to them.

== Cast ==
- Jennifer N. Linch as Daisy
- Noah Sargent as William
- Mark Atkinson as Marv
- Amber Grayson as Thief
- David S. Dawson as Grandpa
- Whitney Wegman-Wood as The Boss
- Eddie Lain as Harry
- Kiki Yeung as Auntie Minh
- Rene Fernandez as Warren

== Production ==
This is the feature length directorial debut for Linch. An indie martial arts film, Kung Fu Ghost was produced by Nameless Studio. The film was shot with an Angenieux Lens on a Red Epic 8K camera in San Diego. After wrapping principal photography in 2019, additional scenes were scheduled to be filmed in July 2020. Larry Johnson of Stanford, Kentucky was an associate producer on the project.

== Release ==
The film was initially scheduled to release late in 2020 though it would later be announced to release in summer 2020. It was then delayed until the following Summer, before an eventual release on August 2, 2022. The film was distributed by Vision Films.

== Reception ==
Alan Ng at Film Threat scored it 6 out of 10 claiming “dialogue is the film’s greatest weakness.” Jim Morazzini of Voices From The Balcony rated it 3 out of 5 and stated it should be of interest to a younger audience. That's My Entertainment praised the film, saying "it knows exactly what it’s supposed to be and leans into it." Space Jockey Reviews says it includes an homage to Ghost, claiming that it's a "fun, ultimately uplifting movie." The Action Elite compared the film to older Jackie Chan movies and complimented the choreography. World Film Geek scored it a B+ claiming that the "choreography is actually pretty decent for an American B movie." In a mixed review, Trina Boice says that that "musical score is appropriately goofy" but the "dialogue is clunky and stiffly delivered."
