= Daisy Belle (film) =

2018 film by William Wall

- Directed by: William Wall
- Written by: William Wall
- Produced by: Caroline Amiguet; Ginger Holland; Beryl Huang; Jean-Francois Cavelier; Marisa Kapavik; Matt Sivertson; Edward Wall; Kimberly Wall
- Starring: Lily Elsie
- Cinematography: William Wall
- Edited by: William Wall
- Music by: Steve Garbade
- Production company: Bruber Media Partners
- Distributed by: Dust
- Release date: October 13, 2018
- Running time: 11 minutes
- Country: United States
- Language: English

Daisy Belle is a 2018 science fiction short film written and directed by William Wall. The film stars Lily Elsie, qualified for an Oscar at Bermuda International Film Festival, won five Pacific Southwest Emmy Awards at National Academy of Televisions Arts and Sciences, was distributed by Dust and shot in San Diego.

== Plot ==
In a world full of strange creatures, a domestic robot dedicates its life to looking after Daisy Belle, its owner who has passed away.

== Cast ==
Lily Elsie as Daisy Belle

== Production ==
The film was created in San Diego using computer animation and miniatures. It's an existential film with "technical movie production challenges." Wall said he and his team brainstormed the idea of the story, making sure it fit into the scope of his usual short film budget. He made the robot "Oono" out of metal to give it a rusty, vintage look. Wall’s film includes themes of surrealism and dark fantasy.

== Release ==
The film screened at San Diego International Film Festival, Oceanside International Film Festival, Coronado Island Film Festival, Trieste Science+Fiction Festival, Idyllwild International Festival of Cinema, Grossmann Fantastic Film and Wine Festival, DaVinci International Film Festival, NOLA Horror Film Fest, Madeira Fantastic FilmFest, Menorca International Film Festival, Amarcort Film Festival, New Hope Film Festival, Apocalypse Later Film Festival and The Not-So-Silent Short Film Fest. It qualified for the Oscar list at Bermuda International Film Festival and was later released on Dust.

== Reception ==
=== Accolades ===
List of awards
Festival	Year	Award	Recipient(s)	Result	Ref.
Idyllwild International Festival of Cinema	2019	Best Animation	Daisy Belle	Won	
San Diego International Film Festival	2018	Best Local Film	Daisy Belle	Won	
National Academy of Television Arts & Sciences	2018	Pacific Southwest Emmy Award for Short Format Program	William Wall	Won	
National Academy of Television Arts & Sciences	2018	Pacific Southwest Emmy Award for Graphic Arts – Animation	Mike Smith	Won	
National Academy of Television Arts & Sciences	2018	Pacific Southwest Emmy Award for Graphic Arts –Art Direction/Set Design	Eva Pfaff	Won	
National Academy of Television Arts & Sciences	2018	Pacific Southwest Emmy Award for Musical Composition/Arrangement	Steve Garbade	Won	
National Academy of Television Arts & Sciences	2018	Pacific Southwest Emmy Award for Director - Non-Live	William Wall	Won	
New Hope Film Festival	2018	Best Experimental Short	Daisy Belle	Won	
Vision Feast Film Festival	2018	Best Cinematography	William Wall	Won	
