= Carving a Life =

2017 American film by Terry Ross

- Poster
- Directed by: Terry Ross
- Written by: Lisa Bruhn
- Produced by: Evette Betancourt
- Starring: Tyler Bruhn; Karenssa LeGear; Aaron Landon Bornstein; Lisa Winans; Sandi Todorovic; Jay Jee; Laura Bohlin; Navid Negahban; Tiffany Espensen
- Cinematography: Oscar Velázquez
- Edited by: Janna Reznik
- Music by: Edna Alejandra Longoria
- Production company: Life In Reels Productions
- Distributed by: Indie Rights
- Release date: October 13, 2017
- Running time: 83 minutes
- Country: United States
- Language: English

Carving a Life is a 2017 American romance drama film directed by Terry Ross and written by Lisa Bruhn. The film stars Tyler Bruhn and Karenssa LeGear.

== Plot ==
Mitch (Tyler Bruhn), a woodworker struggling with alcoholism after the death of his mother, begins a relationship with Lauren (Karenssa LeGear), a local elementary schoolteacher. His past trauma and difficult relationship with his father strains his romantic relationship with Lauren.

== Cast ==
- Tyler Bruhn as Mitch
- Karenssa LeGear as Lauren
- Aaron Landon Bornstein as Stephen
- Lisa Winans as Rebecca
- Sandi Todorovic as Eric
- Jay Jee as Dr. Johnson
- Laura Bohlin as Mary
- Navid Negahban as Dr. Kasem
- Tiffany Espensen as Veronica
- Lindsay Kaye Sainato as Lyndsey
- Marla Bingham as Rehab Psychologist
- Kathleen Holt as Nurse Mary
- Max Baroudi as Young Mitch
- Samuel James Pfoser as Young Eric
- Kellen Rose as Kid at beach
- Mark Benjamin as Ethan
- Frank Papia as Gordon
- Lizet Benrey as Rehab Counselor

== Production ==
It was the debut film of director Terry Ross. Principal photography took place in North County of San Diego, Anaheim and Julian, California.

== Release ==
The film was presented at the American Film Market. The film had a screening in San Diego, a limited theatrical release in Los Angeles and was distributed by Indie Rights.

== Reception ==
The film received mixed to negative reviews from critics. Katie Walsh at Los Angeles Times described it as well-intentioned but amateurish, calling it "the kind of DIY indie film that tries very, very hard but completely misses the mark." Adam Keller at Film Threat scored it 1 out of 5 stating it was "stream-of-consciousness mush." Chris Olson at UK Film Review scored it 4 stars calling it "genuinely moving [...] tender and engaging." Occhi Magazine rated the film 3 stars and said it would've been better with an "expanded plot and more focus on the characters."
