= Slaughterhouse (film) =

- Theatrical release poster
- Directed by: Rick Roessler
- Written by: Rick Roessler
- Produced by: Ron Matona
- Starring: Joe B. Barton; Sherry Bendorf; Don Barrett; William Houck
- Cinematography: Richard Benda
- Edited by: Sergio Uribe
- Distributed by: American Artists
- Release date: September 11, 1987
- Running time: 85 minutes
- Country: United States
- Language: English
- Budget: $110,000

Slaughterhouse is a 1987 American black comedy slasher film directed by Rick Roessler and starring Joe B. Barton.

In the film, an eccentric farmer is about to lose ownership of his property. Learning that his simple-minded son has started killing random people, the farmer decides to use his son as a weapon against the people which he blames for his property loss. Meanwhile, the daughter of the local sheriff attempts to shoot a video in the farmer's slaughterhouse, and soon has to fight to survive.

== Plot ==
Lester Bacon is an old farmer living with his simple-minded, obese son Buddy. Lester's old hog farming ways have been replaced with modern factory-type slaughterhouses. Buddy kills two teenagers, Kevin Matthews and Michelle Mitchell, at Lovers Lane. The next day, Lester's attorney Harold Murdock, along with his law partner Tom Sanford and Sheriff Fred Borden, visit Lester at his house to offer him $55,000 to buy his property, along with the closed-down slaughterhouse next door, but he refuses. Fred tells Lester that the assessor's office is foreclosing his property, and he has 30 days to vacate it.

Meanwhile, high-schoolers Skip, Buzz, Annie, and Liz—Sheriff Borden's daughter—are planning to shoot a "horror video" and believe that the area around the Bacon Slaughterhouse would be perfect. Back at Lester's property, Buddy shows him the dead Michelle and Kevin, and Lester says that Tom, Harold, and Fred deserve such a fate.

Deputy Dave Thomas goes to the slaughterhouse to look for the missing couple. As Dave finds a dead hanging cat, Buddy kills him by chopping off his hand. Harold arrives shortly after, and Buddy crushes his skull. Buddy then takes Dave's squad car for a joy ride. He encounters Dave's girlfriend Sally Duncan, who flees when she sees him. Buddy pursues her, catches up to her, and cuts her throat. When Tom arrives at the slaughterhouse, Lester lures him to the processing room, where Buddy drops him into a grinder.

That night, Fred finds Dave's abandoned car and calls for backup. Liz and her friends arrive at the slaughterhouse and split up. Buddy kills Skip, Annie, and Buzz in quick succession. Liz finds the bodies of the other victims. Meanwhile, Fred learns that Tom and Harold have mysteriously disappeared.

Buddy and Lester capture Liz and begin torturing her, but when Fred arrives, Liz kicks Lester and runs off, reuniting with her father. As Fred pauses at his car door, Lester stabs him in the back, and Liz shoots Lester with her father's gun before loading in Fred and running over Lester's head, killing him. As Liz drives away, Buddy rises from the backseat, finishes off Fred, and swings his knife at Liz, the film ending on her scream.

== Cast ==
- Joe B. Barton as Buddy Bacon
- Don Barrett as Lester Bacon
- William Houck as Sheriff Fred Borden
- Sherry Leigh (credited as Sherry Bendorf) as Liz Borden
- Jeff Wright as Deputy Dave Thomas
- Bill Brinsfield as Tom Sanford
- Lee Robinson as Harold Murdock
- Dave Fogel as Disc Jockey

== Production ==
Principal photography occurred over 21 days, primarily in San Ysidro and a few days in Lakeside, California. The hog farm depicted in the opening sequence was located in Oregon.

== Release ==
The film was given a limited release theatrically in the United States by American Artists on September 11, 1987.

=== Home media ===
Slaughterhouse was subsequently released on VHS by Charter Entertainment. The film was released in a special edition DVD in 1999 by Program Power Entertainment.

In the United Kingdom, the film was released on Blu-ray on February 23, 2015 as Number 05 of 88 Films' "Slasher Classics Collection" series. A restored 30th anniversary director's cut edition of the film was independently released on Blu-ray in December 2015, and is available via Amazon Prime.

Vinegar Syndrome released Slaughterhouse on Blu-ray in 2017, from a 2K master direct, from a 35 mm interpositive and master magnetic surround soundtrack.

== Reception ==
=== Critical response ===
The film received an unfavorable review from The Washington Post. Stephen Hunter of The Baltimore Sun compared the film negatively to The Texas Chain Saw Massacre (1974), and awarded it one out of five stars.
