= Demon Protocol =

2018 film by Kelly Parks

- Poster
- Directed by: Kelly Parks
- Written by: Kelly Parks
- Produced by: Brian Daley; Janice Daley; Peter Lugo; Leonard McLeod; Raymond Montemayor; John Niewiadomy; Kelly Parks
- Starring: Gary Graham; Sarah Agor; Caroline Amiguet; David Gerrold; Bethany Regan; Tim Baran; Lexsy McKowen; Matt Bradford; Scott Hopkins; Christina Alexandra Boyd
- Cinematography: Peter Lugo
- Edited by: John Niewiadomy
- Music by: Sasikumar B.
- Production company: Late in Life Productions
- Distributed by: Meridian Releasing Group
- Release date: March 23, 2018
- Running time: 60 minutes
- Country: United States
- Language: English

Demon Protocol is a 2018 supernatural horror film written and directed by Kelly Parks in his feature film debut. The film stars Gary Graham, Sarah Agor, Caroline Amiguet, David Gerrold and Bethany Regan.

== Plot ==
After an exorcism goes awry, a religious team is to determine who the demon has possessed.

== Cast ==
- Gary Graham as Father Prester J. Bedford
- Sarah Agor as Silver
- Caroline Amiguet as Anna Wilson
- David Gerrold as James McCarthy
- Bethany Regan as Melanie Santos
- Tim Baran as David Haber
- Lexsy McKowen as Camilla
- Matt Bradford as John Wilson
- Scott Hopkins as Gregory
- Christina Alexandra Boyd as Luisa

== Production ==
The film was produced by Late in Life Productions. It was shot in San Diego, California and is the feature film debut for director Kelly Parks. Parks said while working with Graham, he opted out of the script at times letting his character try something else.

== Release ==
The film released on March 23, 2018, and streaming on April 9, 2018, by Meridian Releasing Group. Kelly Parks uploaded the film on YouTube on November 10, 2022.

== Reception ==
Mark Longden at We Are Movie Geeks compared the film to The Thing. Jim Morazzini at Voices From The Balcony gave it 3.5 out of 5, claiming it is an "enjoyable watch." A review at Without Your Head was scored 2 out of 5 but claimed the dialogue stands out. Peter Hopkins at Horror Screams Video Vault said it is an "easy to follow story."
