= Daydream Hotel =

2017 film by Tony Perri

- Original title: Nadoland
- Directed by: Tony Perri
- Written by: Tony Perri; Marg Stark
- Produced by: Caroline Amiguet; Christian Esquevin; Susan Espinoza Hunt; Lori Morkunas Jones; Susan Kidd; Tony Perri; Bill Reitmeyer; Shane Schmeichel; Morgan Willis
- Starring: Mark Allyn; Caroline Amiguet; Felicity Bryant; Mark Anthony Cox; Josh Concepcion; Halle Cox; Hannah Alicia Cox; John D. Culver; Kelsey Fordham
- Cinematography: Tony Perri; Austin Varco
- Edited by: Carlos Pelayo; Tony Perri
- Production company: Coronado School of the Arts
- Release date: January 17, 2016 (Coronado Island Film Festival)
- Running time: 72 minutes
- Country: United States
- Language: English
- Budget: $30,000

Daydream Hotel, also known as Nadoland, is a 2016 fantasy drama film directed by Tony Perri and written by Perri and Marg Stark. The film stars Mark Allyn, Caroline Amiguet, Felicity Bryant, and Mark Anthony Cox.

It was produced by the Coronado School of the Arts and filmed at the Hotel Del Coronado. The film won awards at WorldFest-Houston International Film Festival and Coronado Island Film Festival.

== Plot ==
In 2022, guests at a scenic hotel discover the ability to become fantasized versions of themselves.

== Cast ==
- Mark Allyn as Chuck
- Caroline Amiguet as Grace Taylor
- Felicity Bryant as Sandy
- Mark Anthony Cox as Harry Canon
- Josh Concepcion as Josh
- Halle Cox as Bella
- Hannah Alicia Cox as Brooklyn
- John D. Culver as Dr. Herschell Flint
- Kelsey Fordham as Kelly Bale

== Production ==
Originally called Nadoland, it is the first feature film shot at the Hotel del Coronado since The Stunt Man starring Peter O'Toole in 1979. Another location used for filming was the Glorietta Bay Inn with local actors and CHS students from San Diego. The setting takes place in the year 2022. The film was produced by Coronado School of the Arts.

== Release ==
The film premiered at Coronado Island Film Festival on January 17, 2016.

== Reception ==
=== Critical response ===
Lamarshell Karnas at Coronado Times called the film "original and playful." Dana Chisholm complimented the acting and aerial photography.

=== Accolades ===
| Festival | Year | Award | Recipient(s) | Result | Ref. |
|---|---|---|---|---|---|
| WorldFest-Houston International Film Festival | 2017 | Dramatic Feature | Tony Perri | Won | |
| WorldFest-Houston International Film Festival | 2017 | Best Actress - Critics Choice | Emma Kidd | Nominated | |
| Coronado Island Film Festival | 2017 | Student Feature Film Grand Winner | Daydream Hotel | Won | |
| Accolade Global Film Competition | 2016 | Award of Merit - Feature Film | Daydream Hotel | Won | |
