= Zipperface =

1992 American film by Mansour Pourmand

- VHS released by Action International Pictures
- Directed by: Mansour Pourmand
- Written by: Mansour Pourmand (story); Barbara Bishop (screenplay)
- Story by: Mansour Pourmand
- Produced by: Mansour Pourmand
- Starring: David Clover; Donna Adams; Jonathan Mandell
- Cinematography: F. Smith Martin
- Edited by: John Dagnen
- Music by: Jim Halfpenny
- Production company: Shiman Productions Inc.
- Distributed by: Shiman Productions Inc.
- Release date: July 15, 1992 (Germany)
- Running time: 90 minutes
- Country: United States
- Language: English

Zipperface is a 1992 American erotic slasher film written and directed by Mansour Pourmand, and co-written by Barbara Bishop. It stars David Clover, Donna Adams, and Jonathan Mandell.

== Plot ==
A sadomasochistic serial killer in a bondage suit is running amok in Palm City, murdering stage actresses who moonlight as BDSM prostitutes. Assigned to the case are Detectives Lisa Ryder and Harry Shine, who are under pressure to apprehend the culprit as soon as possible in order to appease the ruthless Mayor Angela Harris. As the duo's investigation progresses, they uncover a number of different suspects, including a misogynist fellow officer named Willy Scalia, a cross-dressing mayor's aide named Devon McClain, a charitable preacher named Reverend Dimsdale, and a professional photographer named Michael Walker.

Lisa begins dating Michael in secret, which leads to her suspension from the force when mounting circumstantial evidence points towards him being "Zipperface". After a warrant is put out for Michael's arrest, he and Lisa go to confront Reverend Dimsdale, having realized that he is in some way connected to all of Zipperface's victims, possibly acting as a pimp for the sex workers who he was supposed to be helping find God. The two discover the reverend dead from a slit throat, and question one of his prostitutes, who informs them that Dimsdale had earlier called her, begging her not to go to her appointment with a new "John".

Lisa and Michael follow the directions that the prostitute had been given to an abandoned warehouse that contains Zipperface's sex dungeon, unaware that they are being tailed by Detective Shine. Zipperface wounds Michael and attempts to strangle Lisa, but Michael recovers, saves her and stabs Zipperface with his own machete. This incapacitates him long enough for Shine to arrive with both backup and Mayor Harris. Zipperface is unmasked to reveal that he is the mayor's husband, Brewster. After her husband rants about how feelings of emasculation drove him to dominate and eventually murder prostitutes, the distraught Mayor Harris, realizing that her political career is now over, pulls out a gun and shoots Brewster.

== Cast ==
- Donna Adams as Detective Lisa Ryder
- Jonathan Mandell as Michael Walker
- David Clover as Detective Harry Shine
- Trisha Melynkov as Mayor Angela Harris
- Bruce Brown as Brewster Harris
- Harold Cannon as Chief Wexford
- Timothy D. Lechner as Devon McClain
- Richard Vidan as Detective Willy Scalia
- Jillian Ross as Natalie
- Rikki Brando as Sherry Lockwood
- Kimberly Hamilton-Mansfield as Janet Manson
- Laureen E. Clair as Elizabeth
- Mike Ferraro as Alvin Russo
- Denise Ezell as Lana Baker
- Christopher Dakin as Reverend Dimsdale

== Reception ==
Zipperface was panned by critics. The film was heavily criticized by TV Guide, which condemned it as a cross between "female exploitation and feminist-bashing" that was "low-grade in all departments, not just gender politics". The film was similarly derided by Todd Martin of Horror News, who wrote, "Not only is it unoriginal and poorly-written, it also has some of the worst acting I have seen in a very long time and is just a mighty bad movie in general in every conceivable way." Horror Society also reviewed the film, writing that "Overall, Zipperface is bad but I had fun with it. I can’t recommend it to everyone but if you like the shittier side of cinema then you may enjoy this oddball film."
