= The Last Butterflies =

2023 film by Patrick Rea

- Poster
- Directed by: Patrick Rea
- Written by: Whitney Wegman-Wood
- Produced by: Cooper Andrews; Jake Jackson; Whitney Wegman-Wood; John Wood
- Starring: Whitney Wegman-Wood; Cooper Andrews; Merrick McCartha; Adam Boyer; Amber Grayson; Ivy Hickman; Herb Jackson Jr.
- Cinematography: Taylor Snyder
- Edited by: Patrick Rea
- Music by: Ben Adams; Bobby Brader
- Production companies: Barnacle and Spoon Productions; Heartland Films
- Release date: September 19, 2023 (Arizona Underground Film Festival)
- Country: United States
- Language: English
- Budget: $36,000

The Last Butterflies is a 2023 short survival drama directed by Patrick Rea and written by Whitney Wegman-Wood. The film stars Wegman-Wood, Cooper Andrews, Adam Boyer, Merrick McCartha, Amber Grayson and Ivy Hickman.

== Plot ==
A mother and child seek shelter in a dystopia after environmental disasters caused society to plummet.

== Cast ==
- Whitney Wegman-Wood
- Cooper Andrews
- Merrick McCartha
- Adam Boyer
- Amber Grayson
- Ivy Hickman
- Herb Jackson Jr.

== Production ==
Wegman-Wood was inspired by nightmares and anxiety dreams she experienced in 2019 about "world rife with drought, famine and environmental devastation." Principal photography occurred in 2022 in Kansas City, Mound City, The Mildred Store in Mildred, Kansas, and Oceanside, California. Wegman-Wood co-starred in the film with Cooper Andrews. Patrick Rea directed and Sue Vicory was the executive producer.

== Release ==
The film premiered in 2023 at Arizona Underground Film Festival and screened at Coronado Island Film Festival, Culver City Film Festival San Diego Film Week, Borrego Springs Film Festival, and Always Late TV Movie Awards.

== Reception ==
Accolades
Festival	Year	Award	Recipient(s)	Result	Ref.
Arizona Underground Film Festival	2023	Best Narrative Short	The Last Butterflies	Won	
Coronado Island Film Festival	2023	Frances Marion Award for outstanding achievement in screenwriting by a woman	Whitney Wegman-Wood	Won	
San Diego Film Week	2023	Best Drama Short Film	The Last Butterflies	Nominated	
