= Things We Dig =

2020 film by Pia Thrasher

- Poster
- Directed by: Pia Thrasher
- Written by: Pia Thrasher
- Produced by: Courtney Eastman; Jeremy Katz; Stephen Mickelsen; Miguel Rodriguez; J.R. Thrasher; Pia Thrasher
- Starring: Jenn Larson; Pia Thrasher; Cat Forrest; Morgan Marlow; Marc Biagi; Stephanie Scurry; Patrick Russel Burton; Deepti Kingra Mickelsen
- Cinematography: Peter Mickelsen
- Edited by: Peter Stoll
- Music by: Eric Recourt
- Production company: Spinnera Filme
- Distributed by: Screamfest
- Release date: October 14, 2020 (Screamfest Horror Film Festival)
- Running time: 19 minutes
- Country: United States
- Language: English

Things We Dig is a 2020 comedy horror short film written and directed by Pia Thrasher. The film stars Jenn Larson, Thrasher, Cat Forrest and Morgan Marlow.

== Plot ==
Four female vampire roommates gather together to make a quick buck.

== Cast ==
- Jenn Larson as Lucretia
- Pia Thrasher as Kuni von Stechen
- Cat Forrest as Helgi
- Morgan Marlow as Brynn 'The Hacker'
- Marc Biagi as Miles
- Stephanie Scurry as Deanna
- Patrick Russel Burton as Scott
- Deepti Kingra Mickelsen as Mona
- Beth Accomando as Dead Clown
- Billy Colestock as Freddy
  - Mike Burnell as Freddy's voice
- Phillip Lorenzo as Dead Monk
- Elsa Mickelsen as Wrapped Victim
- Matt Rotman as Dead Alien
- Didi Tee as The Stiff
- Tony Weidinger as Dead Hunter

== Production ==
Thrasher was inspired to create something like What We Do in the Shadows. She said the film took four years to make, with pre-production and principal photography in 2019 and wrapping post-production in 2020. The film was shot in San Diego mockumentary style and was crowdfunded on Indiegogo.

== Release ==
Things We Dig premiered at Screamfest Horror Film Festival on October 14, 2020. The festival later distributed the film on YouTube. The film screened at Horror Haus in 2020, Ax Wound Film Festival in 2021 and San Diego International Film Festival in 2022.

== Reception ==
Emilie Black at Cinema Crazed said how the good casting helps create magic with only a few minutes of screen time. Ben Ragunton at TG Geeks said the production value was rich and is worth watching with a glass of wine. Berlyn Nikolunauer at Morbidly Beautiful said the film was "a playful kind of silly." They all compared the film to What We Do in the Shadows.

Accolades
Festival	Year	Award	Recipient(s)	Result	Ref.
International Vampire Film and Arts Festival	2020	Golden Stake	Pia Thrasher	Nominated	
Misty Moon International Film Festival	2020	Best Short Film	Pia Thrasher	Finalist	
6ix Screams International Horror Film Festival	2021	Classic Villain	Pia Thrasher	Won	
Austin After Dark Film Festival	2021	Best Director	Pia Thrasher	Nominated	
Austin After Dark Film Festival	2021	Best Dark Comedy Film	Pia Thrasher	Nominated	
End of Days Film Festival	2021	Best Cast Ensemble	Jenn Larson, Pia Thrasher, Cat Forrest, Morgan Marlow	Won	
Sick Chick Flicks Film Festival	2021	Best Horror Film	Pia Thrasher	Won	
Night Terrors Film Festival	2021	Best Film	Pia Thrasher	Nominated	
San Diego Film Awards	2022	Best Hair and Makeup	Ty Marie Combe	Nominated	
San Diego Film Awards	2022	Best Production Design	Elsa Mickelsen	Nominated	
San Diego Film Awards	2022	Best Costume Design	Elsa Mickelsen	Nominated	
San Diego Film Awards	2022	Best Emerging Actor	Morgan Marlow	Nominated	
