= William Wall (filmmaker) =

American filmmaker (born 1977)

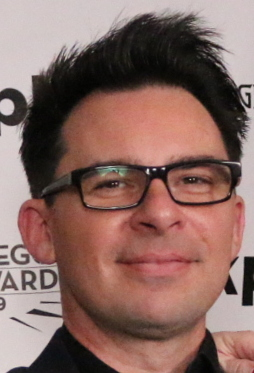
- Wall in 2019
- Born: May 6, 1977 (age 49)
- Education: Santana High School
- Occupations: Film director; screenwriter; cinematographer; film producer
- Years active: 2010–present
- Known for: Daisy Belle
- Notable credit: Love All You Have Left
- Awards: List of Awards

William Wall (born May 6, 1977) is an American filmmaker and cinematographer known for Daisy Belle (2018), Zero (2014), The Immortal Edward Lumley (2013) and Love All You Have Left (2017).

== Early life ==
Wall grew up in East County, San Diego. He graduated from Santana High School in 1995 and moved to Maine for a brief period before settling in Escondido, California.

== Career ==
Wall began his career in film after working on music videos. He primarily focuses on short film productions because they are much easier to make on a financial level.

Wall started planning his project Zero: Dawn of the Darklighters in 2015, based on his 2014 film. In 2018, his film Daisy Belle screened at Oceanside International Film Festival, winning multiple Pacific Southwest Emmy Awards at National Academy of Television Arts and Sciences and Best Local Film at San Diego International Film Festival.

Wall considers Oscar Wilde and Steven Spielberg to have the most influence on his work.

== Filmography ==
Year	Title	Director	Writer	Producer	Cinematographer	Notes
2010	The Wheeler of Oz	Yes	Yes	Yes	Yes	Short film
2013	The Immortal Edward Lumley	Yes	Yes	Yes	Yes	
2014	Zero	Yes	Yes	Yes	Yes	Short film
2017	Love All You Have Left	No	No	No	Yes	
2018	Daisy Belle	Yes	Yes	No	Yes	Short film

== Accolades ==
Festival	Year	Award	Title	Result	Ref.
Idyllwild International Festival of Cinema	2019	Best Animation	Daisy Belle	Won	
San Diego International Film Festival	2018	Best Local Film	Daisy Belle	Won	
National Academy of Television Arts & Sciences	2018	Pacific Southwest Emmy Award for Short Format Program	Daisy Belle	Won	
National Academy of Television Arts & Sciences	2018	Pacific Southwest Emmy Award for Director - Non-Live	Daisy Belle	Won	
New Hope Film Festival	2018	Best Experimental Short	Daisy Belle	Won	
Vision Feast Film Festival	2018	Best Cinematography	Daisy Belle	Won	
