= Deviant (2018 film) =

2018 film by Benjamin Howard

- Poster
- Directed by: Benjamin Howard
- Written by: James Hall; Benjamin Howard
- Produced by: Brian DeGour; Benjamin Howard; Ricardo Osuna; Wally Schlotter; Rich Underwood
- Starring: Rudy Pankow; Mike Burnell; Krystina Montemurro; Court Rutter
- Cinematography: Alex Niknejad
- Edited by: James Hall; Benjamin Howard
- Music by: Tyler Rivera Stein
- Distributed by: Omeleto
- Release date: June 9, 2018
- Running time: 10 minutes
- Country: United States
- Language: English
- Budget: $6,500

Deviant is a 2018 drama short film directed by Benjamin Howard and written by Howard and James Hall. The film stars Rudy Pankow, Mike Burnell, Krystina Montemurro and Court Rutter.

== Plot ==
In the 1960s, a sexually conflicted teenager escapes the tortures of electrotherapeutic conversion therapy to find hope and acceptance.

== Cast ==
- Rudy Pankow
- Mike Burnell
- Krystina Montemurro
- Court Rutter

== Production ==
The project is Howard's undergraduate capstone film made at San Diego State University in the spring of 2017. He said "Deviant takes a young teenager, whose sexual preference comes into direct conflict with his faith and family." In scouting locations for the church, members of the production visited numerous LGBT-friendly churches in the San Diego area. Several turned down the production due to the script's mature themes. The church sequences were eventually filmed at Kensington Community Church, in San Diego.

== Release ==
Deviant premiered on June 9, 2018, at Dances with Films. It went on to screen at Outfest, HollyShorts Film Festival, Cleveland International Film Festival, Nashville Film Festival, GI Film Festival San Diego and San Diego International Film Festival. The film was distributed by Omeleto on April 20, 2020. It has amassed over a quarter-million views since its release online.

== Reception ==
Before the film's festival premiere, Howard was recognized with an award for Best Directing at San Diego State's Emerging Filmmakers Showcase in the spring semester, 2017. In 2019, Deviant received a Student Emmy Award at the Pacific Southwest Chapter for National Academy of Television Arts and Sciences.

The film received more than 20 awards and nominations over the year and a half it played on the festival circuit, including several for Pankow and Howard, for acting and directing, respectively. Howard used the film as part of his application to UCLA film school, and was admitted into the program in 2018.

=== Accolades ===
List of awards and nominations
Festival	Year	Award	Recipient(s)	Result	Ref.
Pacific Southwest Emmy Award	2019	Student Programming - Short Form	Deviant	Won	
Fine Cut Festival of Films	2019	Best Student Film	Deviant	Nominated	
San Diego Film Awards	2019	Best Narrative Short Film	Benjamin Howard	Won	
San Diego Film Awards	2019	Best Direction: Narrative Short Film	Benjamin Howard	Won	
San Diego Film Awards	2019	Best Cinematography: Narrative Short Film	Alex Niknejad	Won	
San Diego Film Awards	2019	Best Production Design: Narrative Short Film	Phuong Truong	Won	
San Diego Film Awards	2019	Best Editing: Narrative Short Film	Benjamin Howard	Nominated	
San Diego Film Awards	2019	Best Editing: Narrative Short Film	James Hall	Nominated	
San Diego Film Awards	2019	Best Costume: Narrative Short Film	Alejandra Guerrero	Nominated	
Prison City Film Festival	2019	The Captain's Award (Best Director)	Benjamin Howard	Won	
Prison City Film Festival	2019	The C.O. Award (U.S. Narrative Short)	Benjamin Howard	Nominated	
Prison City Film Festival	2019	The C.O. Award (U.S. Narrative Short)	James Hall	Nominated	
Prison City Film Festival	2019	The C.O. Award (U.S. Narrative Short)	Ricardo Osuna	Nominated	
Prison City Film Festival	2019	The Major's Award (Narrative Short - Best Actor)	Rudy Pankow	Nominated	
Prison City Film Festival	2019	The Major's Award (Narrative Short - Best Supporting Actor)	Court Rutter	Nominated	
Prison City Film Festival	2019	The Desk Boss Award (Best in Genre: Drama)	Benjamin Howard	Nominated	
Prison City Film Festival	2019	The Desk Boss Award (Best in Genre: Drama)	James Hall	Nominated	
Prison City Film Festival	2019	The Desk Boss Award (Best in Genre: Drama)	Ricardo Osuna	Nominated	
Prison City Film Festival	2019	U.S. Short Film Award (Best Overall Submission)	Benjamin Howard	Nominated	
Prison City Film Festival	2019	U.S. Short Film Award (Best Overall Submission)	James Hall	Nominated	
Prison City Film Festival	2019	U.S. Short Film Award (Best Overall Submission)	Ricardo Osuna	Nominated	
Humboldt International Film Festival	2019	Honorable Mention for Acting	Rudy Pankow	Won	
Humboldt International Film Festival	2019	Honorable Mention for Acting	Court Rutter	Won	
Humboldt International Film Festival	2019	Honorable Mention for Acting	Krystina Montemurro	Won	
Humboldt International Film Festival	2019	Honorable Mention for Acting	Mike Burnell	Won	
San Diego Film Week	2019	Jury Award	Benjamin Howard	Won	
