= The Evil Rises =

2018 film by Daniel Florenzano

- Poster
- Directed by: Daniel Florenzano
- Written by: Daniel Florenzano
- Produced by: Daniel Florenzano; Scott Oram
- Starring: Bailey La Flam; Michael Glauser; Julian De La Mora; Joe Paulson; Alec Lobato; Ed Hollingsworth
- Cinematography: Chris Neighbors
- Edited by: Paul Rio
- Music by: Troy Maturo
- Distributed by: Terror Films
- Release date: February 24, 2018 (Hollywood Reel Independent Film Festival)
- Running time: 84 minutes
- Country: United States
- Language: English

The Evil Rises is a 2018 horror film written and directed by Daniel Florenzano in his feature film debut. The film stars Bailey La Flam, Michael Glauser, Julian De Mora and Joe Paulson.

== Plot ==
An ancient statue possessed by an evil spirit terrorizes a group of young kids on its quest for world domination.

== Cast ==
- Bailey La Flam
- Michael Glauser
- Julian De La Mora
- Joe Paulson
- Alec Lobato
- Ed Hollingsworth

== Production ==
The film is Florenzano's feature length debut and shot in San Diego.

== Release ==
The Evil Rises was distributed by Terror Films. It was released on Tubi for a period of time before branching out to other platforms including JoBlo's YouTube channel.

== Reception ==
The film won Best Horror Film at Hollywood Reel Independent Film Festival.

=== Critical response ===
Cryptic Rock said it is a "decent low budget," giving it 4 out of 5 stars. Voices From The Balcony claims it's "the kind of stupid that kicked off so many of the 80s films" and scored it 3.5 out of 5. Movies and Mania rated it 2 out of 5 stars.
