= List of University of California, Berkeley alumni in arts and media =

Notable alumni and students of the University of California, Berkeley, United States, in the areas of arts and media. Alumni who also served as faculty are listed in bold font, with degree and year. Notable faculty members are listed at List of University of California, Berkeley faculty.

== Architecture ==
- Ruth Bancroft – studied architecture for three years, graduating with a teaching certification in 1932; created the Ruth Bancroft Garden in Walnut Creek, California and is known for her extensive collection of plants and her xeric landscape design
- Kofi Bonner – earned a Master of City Planning and a Master of Architecture; known for the heading the redevelopment of the city of Emeryville, California; director of economic development; interim city manager for Oakland, California
- Jonathan Browning – interior designer
- James C. Dodd, B.A. 1952 – first Black architect in Sacramento; founding member of National Organization of Minority Architects
- Hans Hollein, M. Arch. 1960 – architect, awarded the Pritzker Architecture Prize in 1985
- Kathryn McCamant – credited with coining the English term "cohousing" and introducing the cohousing model to North America
- Julia Morgan, B.S. 1894 – architect, designed the Hearst Castle for newspaper businessman William Randolph Hearst
- Eric Owen Moss, M. Arch. 1968 – architect, famous for his contributions in theory and practice in contemporary architecture
- Vladimir Ossipoff, B.A. 1931 – Russia-born "master of modern Hawaiian architecture"
- Sigrid Lorenzen Rupp, graduated 1966 – German-born architect in Silicon Valley
- Sally Bould Stan, B.A. 1939 – residential and commercial architect in Northern California
- Kenneth Tsang – Hong Kong actor who graduated as an architect
- Takeo Uesugi – landscape architect, designer of Japanese gardens throughout the world
- Ella Lillian Wall Van Leer – architect, artist and women's rights activist; also known as the First Lady of Georgia Tech
- Peter Walker, B.S. 1955 – landscape architect, commissions include the World Trade Center Memorial and the Sony Center in Berlin
- Bernard Zimmerman B.A. 1953 – modernist architect and longtime educator at the Cal Poly Pomona College of Environmental Design

== Books ==
- Amir Aczel, B.A. 1975, M.S. 1976 – popular mathematics writer, author of the bestseller Fermat's Last Theorem: Unlocking the Secret of an Ancient Mathematical Problem, former professor of history at Bentley College, Guggenheim Fellow in 2004
- Christopher Andersen, B.A. 1971 – journalist, magazine editor and author of 18 New York Times nonfiction bestsellers including the No. 1 books The Day Diana Died and The Day John Died
- Robert Baer (attended) – former CIA case officer, author of the memoir See No Evil (2003), which served as the basis of the movie Syriana (2005); George Clooney's Academy Award-winning performance is loosely based on Baer
- Mischa Berlinski, B.A. 1998 – novelist, author of Fieldwork (2007)
- Vincent Bevins, B.A. 2006 – journalist, author of The Jakarta Method (2020) and If We Burn (2023)
- Kate Braverman, B.A. 1971 – poet, novelist; author of Lithium for Medea and Palm Latitudes
- David Brock, B.A. 1985 – political author (The Real Anita Hill [1993], Blinded by the Right [2002], The Republican Noise Machine [2004])
- Theresa Hak Kyung Cha, B.A. 1973, B.A. 1975, M.A. 1977, M.F.A. 1978 – multimedia artist; author of Dictee (1982)
- Jeff Chang, B.A. 1989 – hip-hop journalist and political activist; author of Can't Stop, Won't Stop: A History of the Hip-Hop Generation (2005; American Book Award)
- James Chapman, B.A. 1978 – novelist
- Beverly Cleary, B.A. 1938 – author of books for children and young adults
- Susann Cokal, Ph.D. 2001 – novelist, author of Mirabilis, The Kingdom of Little Wounds (Michael L. Printz Award Honor)
- Sara Davidson, 1962 – author
- Lucille Lang Day, B.A. 1971, M.A. 1973, Ph.D. 1979 – poet and author
- Tiffanie DeBartolo, B.A. 1992 – author of God-Shaped Hole and How To Kill A Rock Star, and writer/director of Dream for an Insomniac
- Philip K. Dick (attended) – science fiction author whose stories were made into the movies Blade Runner, Total Recall, Minority Report, Paycheck, Screamers and A Scanner Darkly
- Joan Didion, B.A. 1956 – writer, author of Slouching Towards Bethlehem (1968), The White Album (1979), and The Year of Magical Thinking (2005)
- Chitra Banerjee Divakaruni. Ph.D. 1984 – writer, author of The Mistress of Spices (1997), Sister of My Heart (1999) and The Palace of Illusions (2008)
- Robert Dunn, B.A. 1972 – novelist, publisher, musician
- Meg Elison, B.A. 2014 – novelist and essayist of feminist fiction and non-fiction; winner of the Philip K. Dick Award for The Book of the Unnamed Midwife, and Locus Award winner for "The Pill"
- Karen Joy Fowler, B.A. 1972 – writer, author of The Jane Austen Book Club (2004, later made into a movie of the same name starring Maria Bello, Emily Blunt, and Kathy Baker), We Are All Completely Beside Ourselves (shortlisted for the Man Booker Prize 2014)
- Jackson Gregory, B.L. 1906 – popular author of western and detective novels; many of his works were turned into movies between 1916 and 1944
- Barbara Guest, B.A. 1943 – sole female member of the modernist New York School of poets; awarded the Frost Medal for Lifetime Achievement by the Poetry Society of America (1999)
- Agnes Newton Keith – author/memoirist of seven books about British North Borneo, today Sabah, Malaysia, before and during the Japanese occupation of the 1940s; Three Came Home was made into the Hollywood movie of the same name, starring Claudette Colbert
- Maxine Hong Kingston, B.A. 1962 – author, Senior Lecturer, recipient of 1997 National Humanities Medal awarded by President of the United States Bill Clinton
- Harry Lawton, B.A. 1949 – novelist, author of Willie Boy: A Desert Manhunt (1960), later made into a movie, Tell Them Willie Boy Is Here, starring Robert Redford
- Jack London (attended 1896–1897) – novelist best known for The Call of the Wild, White Fang, and The Sea-Wolf; Martin Eden provides a fictional account of his time at Cal
- Bryan Malessa, B.A. 1999 – novelist, author of The Flight (2007) and The War Room (2011)
- Daniel Marcus, Ph.D. Mechanical Engineering – Science Fiction author
- Greil Marcus, B.A. 1967, M.A. 1968 – cultural and music critic; author of Mystery Train (1975) and Lipstick Traces (1989)
- Terry McMillan, B.A. 1986 – author of Waiting to Exhale (1992; later made into a film of the same name starring Whitney Houston) and How Stella Got Her Groove Back (1996; later made into a film of the same name starring Angela Bassett)
- Dhan Gopal Mukerji – first successful Indian man of letters in the U.S.
- Viet Thanh Nguyen, B.A., Ph.D. 1997 – awarded Pulitzer Prize for the novel The Sympathizer
- Frank Norris (attended 1890–1894) – novelist; author of McTeague (1899), which became the basis for the classic 1924 silent film Greed
- Parker Palmer, Ph.D. 1970 – writer, author of The Courage to Teach (1997), Let Your Life Speak (2000), and A Hidden Wholeness (2004)
- Mary Pipher, B.A. 1969 – author, expert on culture and mental health; author of Reviving Ophelia: Saving the Selves of Adolescent Girls, which was a best seller for over three years; author of the New York Times best seller The Shelter of Each Other: Rebuilding Our Families to Enrich Our Lives
- Rebecca N. Porter, B.A. 1909 – author, journalist, educator
- John V. Robinson, B.A. 1995 – photographer and folklorist, 2006 Guggenheim Fellow, author of several books, including Spanning the Strait: Building the Alfred Zampa Memorial Bridge (2004)
- Anneli Rufus, B.A. 1981 – journalist and author of many books, including Party of One: The Loner's Manifesto
- Shawna Yang Ryan, B.A. 1998 – novelist, author of Water Ghosts (2009), Green Island (2016), professor at University of Hawaiʻi at Mānoa
- Louis Sachar, B.A. 1976 – author, Holes (1998), Sideways Stories From Wayside School series
- Mona Simpson, B.A. 1979 – novelist (Anywhere But Here, later made into a film of the same name starring Susan Sarandon and Natalie Portman), Guggenheim Fellow, professor at Bard College; sister of Steve Jobs (co-founder of Apple Computer)
- Rebecca Solnit, M. Jour. 1984 – author, cultural historian, and activist; books include Wanderlust: A History of Walking (2000) and River of Shadows: Eadweard Muybridge and the Technological Wild West (2003)
- Irving Stone, B.A. 1923 – novelist, Lust for Life (1934, later made into an Academy Award-winning film of the same name starring Kirk Douglas as Vincent van Gogh) and The Agony and the Ecstasy (1961; later made into a film of the same name starring Charlton Heston as Michelangelo)
- Steven L. Thompson, B.A. – novelist, author of The Wild Blue: The Novel of the U.S. Air Force
- William T. Vollmann (attended) – novelist
- Edith Wherry B.A. 1907 – novelist, author of The Red Lantern
- Shawn Wong, B.A. 1971 – novelist, author of American Knees (1995; made into the film Americanese, released in 2009)
- Yang Mu, Ph.D. 1971 – poet, essayist, translator of English poetry into Chinese, first Taiwanese winner of Cikada Prize and Newman Prize for Chinese Literature, professor emeritus of Comparative Literature at University of Washington, author of Hawk of the Mind
- Charles Yu, B.A. 1997 – science-fiction author and writer on TV shows such as Westworld and Here and Now

== Comic strips ==
- Scott Adams, M.B.A. 1986 – creator of Dilbert
- Rube Goldberg, B.S. 1904 – cartoonist and namesake of Rube Goldberg machines, winner of the Pulitzer Prize in 1948(also listed in Pulitzer Prizes section)
- Stephan Pastis, B.A. 1989 – creator of Pearls Before Swine
- Matt Richtel, B.A. 1989 – co-author of the comic strip Rudy Park under the pen name "Theron Heir"; winner of the 2010 Pulitzer Prize for National Reporting (also listed in Pulitzer Prizes section)
- Betty Swords – cartoonist
- Adrian Tomine, B.A. 1996 – comic artist, Optic Nerve; regular illustrator for The New Yorker and other magazines

== Fine art ==
- Gerald M. Ackerman, B.A. 1952 – art historian
- Natalia Anciso, M.A. 2015 – visual and installation artist and educator
- Bruce Ariss, B.A. 1934 – painter, muralist, writer, illustrator, editor as well as theater and set designer, amateur playwright and actor, and overall icon on the Monterey Peninsula
- John Baldessari – conceptual artist
- Dean Byington, M.A. 1987, M.F.A. 1988 – visual artist
- Melanie Cervantes, B.A. 2004 – artist, printmaker, and activist
- Enrique Chagoya, MFA 1987 – artist, printmaker, and professor at Stanford University
- Davi Cheng – visual artist
- Vittoria Chierici – artist
- Robert Colescott, B.A. 1949, M.A. 1952 – artist, educator, and first African American painter to have a solo exhibit at the Venice Biennale
- Warrington Colescott, B.A. 1942, M.A. 1947 – artist, educator, and professor emeritus at University of Wisconsin–Madison
- Jay DeFeo, B.A. 1950 – painter
- Claire Falkenstein, B.A. 1930 – sculptor, painter, print-maker and jewelry designer known for her large-scale abstract metal and glass sculptures
- Sean Go, B.A. Economics, B.A. Geography, B.S. Business Administration – Filipino pop artist
- Joseph Goldyne, B.A. – printmaker, painter
- Hilary Harkness, B.A. – painter
- Ester Hernandez, B.A. 1976 – visual artist
- Gilah Yelin Hirsch – multi-disciplinary artist
- Tom Holland – abstract artist
- Arthur Johnsen, B.A. 1974 – painter, especially of Hawaiiana
- Richard Keyes, M.A. Painting, 1958 – professor emeritus at Long Beach City College, after a 30-year career there teaching life drawing and painting
- Thomas Kinkade, B.A. – painter
- Thomas W. Lentz, M.A. 1978 – art historian
- Taro Masushio, B.A. – artist, writer
- Malaquías Montoya, B.A 1969 – artist and professor emeritus at UC Davis
- Hushidar Mortezaie – collagist and fashion designer
- Shirley Paes Leme, M.A. 1983 – sculptor, printmaker, designer and teacher
- Carole Doyle Peel, M.A 1964 – artist
- John Pollini, M.A. 1973, Ph.D. 1978 – art historian
- Favianna Rodriguez (attended) – artist, printmaker, and activist
- Alexa Sand, M.A. 1994, Ph.D. 1999 – art historian
- Louise Schatz, B.A. 1939 – Canadian-born Israeli artist and designer
- Lanette Scheeline, graduated 1932 – wallpaper and textile designer
- David Scott, Ph.D. 1960 – art historian
- Sarah Seager, B.A. 1982 – artist
- Nancy Selvin, BFA 1969; MA, Ceramics, 1970 – sculptor

== Music ==
- Gregory Abbott – composer and musician; sang "Shake You Down", which reached No. 1 on 1986 Billboard chart
- Thüring Bräm, M.A. – composer
- Suzanne Ciani, M.A. 1970 – composer
- Les Claypool – bassist and singer of Primus
- Stewart Copeland – drummer of The Police
- Henry Cowell (attended 1914) – composer
- Marié Digby (attended) – singer-songwriter
- Adam Duritz (attended) – lead singer of Counting Crows
- Jewlia Eisenberg, B.A. 1998 – musician, co-founder of Charming Hostess
- John Fahey (attended, later transferred to UCLA) – guitarist, founder of Takoma Records
- Liz Harris, B.A. 2002 – singer-songwriter, Grouper
- Davey Havok (attended) – lead singer of AFI
- Susanna Hoffs, B.A. 1980 – lead singer of The Bangles
- Rob Hotchkiss, B.A. 1983 – Grammy winner, guitarist, founding member of Train
- Robert Hurwitz – C.E.O. of Nonesuch Records
- Ivan Ilić, B.A. 2001 – American pianist of Serbian descent based in Paris
- Andrew Imbrie, M.A. 1947 – composer
- Steve Jablonsky – film composer whose works include the scores to Michael Bay's Transformers films, Battleship, and Lone Survivor
- Stephan Jenkins, B.A. 1987 – lead singer and songwriter of Third Eye Blind
- Michael Kang – multi-instrumentalist for the jam band The String Cheese Incident
- Jonathan Kramer, Ph.D. 1969 – composer
- Phil Lesh (attended) – bass guitarist of the Grateful Dead
- Jimmy Lopez, Ph.D. 2012 – classical music composer
- Laura Mam, B.A. Anthropology 2009 – Cambodian singer-songwriter
- Ed Masuga, B.A. 2002 – singer, musician, and songwriter
- Raymond Pepperell – guitarist for Dead Kennedys
- Jade Puget, B.A. 1996 – guitarist of AFI
- Malvina Reynolds, Ph.D. 1938 (also B.A., M.A.) – folk/blues singer-songwriter
- Terry Riley, M.A. 1961 – composer
- Ralph Saenz, Ph.D., aka Michael Starr – lead singer of Steel Panther
- Angela Seo – member of Xiu Xiu
- Shing02 – underground Japanese hip hop artist; achieved mainstream notoriety in the United States primarily for his contributions to the Shinichiro Watanabe anime series Samurai Champloo
- DJ Vlad, DJ
- Matt Wallace, B.A. 1982 – producer, composer
- Charlie Yin, B.A. 2012 – electronic music producer, performs under the name Giraffage
- LaMonte Young (attended) – composer

== Newspapers and magazines ==
- Joan Acocella, B.A. 1966 – dance critic, The New Yorker
- John Battelle, B.A. 1987, M.Jour. 1992 – co-founder of Wired magazine
- Rod Beaton – journalist and media executive with United Press International
- Darrin Bell, B.A. 1997 – 2018 Pulitzer Prize for editorial cartooning
- Susan Berman, M.B.A. 1969 – author (Easy Street, Lady Las Vegas), newspaper reporter, magazine writer (New York)
- Sandra Blakeslee, B.A. 1965 – science writer and correspondent for The New York Times
- Max Boot, B.A. 1992 – conservative columnist and author
- Nina Fallenbaum, B.A. 2000 – food and agriculture editor of Hyphen magazine, writer, and activist
- Frank Finch, B.A. – sportswriter for the Los Angeles Times, covering the Los Angeles Rams and the Los Angeles Dodgers; brother of actress Gloria Stuart
- Pauline Esther Friedman (attended, class of 1938) – aka Abigail Van Buren ("Dear Abby")
- Michelle Goldberg, M.S. – book author and writer for The New York Times and The Nation magazine
- Paul Khlebnikov, B.A. 1984 – investigative journalist, first editor of Forbes in Russia and author of controversial book Godfather of the Kremlin: Boris Berezovsky and the Looting of Russia
- Joseph W. Knowland, B.A. 1953 – former publisher of the Oakland Tribune (1974–1977)
- William F. Knowland, B.A. 1929 – owner, editor and publisher of the Oakland Tribune (1966–1974)
- Wendy Lesser, M.A. 1977, Ph.D. 1982 – cultural critic; founding editor of The Threepenny Review
- Zuzana Licko, B.A. 1984 – co-founder of Emigre magazine and type foundry
- Steve Linde (born 1960) – newspaperman
- T. Christian Miller, B.A. 1992 – founding employee, ProPublica; writer at the Los Angeles Times
- Maureen Orth, B.A. 1964 – author and writer for Vanity Fair magazine
- Susan F. Rasky, B.A. 1974 – former reporter for The New York Times, journalism instructor at UC Berkeley, recipient of the George Polk Award
- Jennifer Rubin, B.A., J.D. – journalist, columnist, Washington Post
- Max Scherr, M.A. – journalist, founder and publisher of the Berkeley Barb
- Hugo Schwyzer – author, speaker and former instructor of history and gender studies
- Lincoln Steffens – one of the most famous practitioners of the muckraking journalistic style
- Steven L. Thompson, B.A. – journalist, columnist at Cycle World
- Adrian Tomine, B.A. 1996 – comic artist, Optic Nerve; regular illustrator for The New Yorker and other magazines
- Rudy VanderLans, B.A. 1984 – co-founder of Emigre magazine and type foundry
- DeWitt Wallace – founder and editor-in-chief of Reader's Digest
- Connie Wang – former executive director of Refinery29
- Jann Wenner (attended) – founder of Rolling Stone magazine

== Broadcasting ==
- Margot Adler, B.A. 1968 – NPR correspondent, host of NPR's Justice Talking
- Robert Bazell, B.A. 1967 – NBC News' Chief Science and Health Correspondent
- Roxy Bernstein, 1996 – California Golden Bears sports announcer
- Jeffrey Brown, B.A. – senior correspondent on the PBS news program The NewsHour with Jim Lehrer
- Peter Chernin, B.A. 1974 – president of News Corporation and CEO of the Fox Group--
- Corey Flintoff, B.A. 1970 – NPR Foreign Desk Correspondent and former host of NPR's All Things Considered
- Greg Gutfeld, B.A. 1987 – blogger and host of the late night talk show Red Eye w/ Greg Gutfeld on the Fox News Channel
- Brianna Keilar, B.A. 2001 – graduated with Phi Beta Kappa in Mass Communication and Psychology; former MTV correspondent; currently a CNN correspondent
- Larry Josephson, B.A. 1973 – public radio producer; former radio host for WBAI and KPFK
- Richard Lui, B.A. Rhetoric – journalist and news anchor for MSNBC; previously a news anchor for five years at CNN Worldwide
- Renée Montagne, B.A. 1973 – co-host of NPR's Morning Edition
- Kent Ninomiya, B.A. 1988 – TV news anchor (KSTP-TV), reporter, executive
- Suchin Pak, B.A. 1997 – MTV correspondent
- Troy Roberts, B.A. 1984 – CBS News correspondent
- Michael Savage, Ph.D. 1978 – conservative radio talk show host, Savage Nation
- Steve Somers, B.A. 1965 – WFAN overnight host
- Michele Tafoya, B.A. 1988 – sports television reporter for ABC Sports and ESPN
- Nicolle Wallace, B.A. – former White House Communications Director, book author and news program host for MSNBC
- Morgan Webb, B.A. 2000 – co-host of X-Play on G4
- Gwendolyn Wright, M.Arch. 1974, Ph.D. 1978 – co-host of popular PBS TV series History Detectives; professor of architecture, history, and art history at Columbia University; Guggenheim Fellow (2004–05)

== Film, television, video games and theatre ==
- Yahya Abdul-Mateen II, B.A. 2008 – actor, best known for portraying David Kane / Black Manta in the DC Extended Universe superhero film Aquaman and Cal Abar in the HBO limited series Watchmen
- Margaret Armen, B.A – television script writer, including three episodes of the original Star Trek series
- George Azar, B.A. 1981 – press photographer and documentary filmmaker, specialising in Middle East coverage
- Bill Bixby (attended) – director, actor (The Incredible Hulk)
- Amir Blumenfeld, B.A. 2005 – writer, comedian, actor and TV host
- Guy Branum, B.A. 1998 – head writer of X-Play
- Golden Brooks, B.A. 1994 – film and television actress
- John Cheng, B.A. 1996 – producer, Horrible Bosses, Mirror Mirror, Horrible Bosses 2, Barely Lethal
- John Cho, B.A. 1996, English literature – actor (American Pie, Harold & Kumar Go to White Castle, Star Trek, Better Luck Tomorrow)
- Jeff Cohen, B.S. 1996 – former actor (Chunk in The Goonies), currently entertainment lawyer
- Michael Colleary, B.A. English 1982 – screenwriter and producer (Face/Off, Firehouse Dog)
- Sachi Cunningham, M.J. – PBS Frontline/world producer and director of photography, Los Angeles Times video journalist
- Brett Dalton, B.A. 2005 – actor (Agents of S.H.I.E.L.D.)
- Zubin Damania, aka ZDoggMD, B.S. 1994 – internet celebrity, hospitalist physician
- Ronald Davidson, B.A. 1921 – screenwriter, director, and producer 1937–1966
- Dix Davis, 1948 – child actor in radio and film
- Roxann Dawson, B.A. 1980 – actress (B'Elanna Torres on the television series Star Trek: Voyager), director, author, playwright
- Camille de Casabianca, M.A. Political Science 1980 – screenwriter, director and novelist
- DougDoug, B.A. (Computer science) – YouTuber and Twitch streamer
- Ralph Edwards, B.A. 1935 – national television host and producer
- George Fan, B.S. 2000 – video game designer best known for designing Plants vs. Zombies (2009)
- Stanley Farrar (attended 1928–1929) – actor
- Syd Field, B.A. 1960 – author of the "bible of scriptwriters"
- Carl Franklin, B.A. 1971 – film director (One False Move [1992], Devil in a Blue Dress [1995], High Crimes [2002], Out of Time [2003])
- Barbara Garson, B.A. 1964 – playwright, author and social activist, best known for the play MacBird!
- Peter Gethers (attended 1970–1972) – screenwriter and author of bestselling Norton the cat trilogy
- Amos Gitai, Ph.D. (Architecture) 1986 – Israeli film director (Field Diary [1982], Eden [2001], Free Zone [2005])
- Mark Goodson, B.A. 1937 – television producer who specialized in game shows
- Karen Grassle, B.A. 1965 – actress, best known for her role as Caroline Ingalls (the mother) on the Little House on the Prairie television series
- Harry Hamlin (transferred to Yale University) – actor, Clash of the Titans, L.A. Law
- Hannah Hart, B.A. (English literature and Japanese Language) 2009 – YouTube content creator and host of My Drunk Kitchen, actress in Camp Takota
- Edith Head, B.A. 1919 – Academy Award-winning costume designer
- Andrew R. Heinze, M.A. 1980, Ph.D. 1987 – playwright and historian
- Amy Hennig, B.A. – video game director (Uncharted trilogy) and writer
- Barbara Holecek – documentary filmmaker
- William Hung (attended) – contestant on American Idol
- Idil Ibrahim – director and producer; founder of Zeila Films
- Chris Innis, B.A. (Film) 1988 – film editor, American Gothic, The Hurt Locker, G.I. Jane (Associate Editor)
- Robbie Jones (Class of 2000) – actor (One Tree Hill)
- Ashley Judd, currently doing PhD – actress (Ruby in Paradise, Divergent)
- Stacy Keach, B.A. 1963 – actor who portrayed Mickey Spillane's Mike Hammer in several films and received a Golden Globe nomination for in 1984, narrator of documentaries by National Geographic and Nova
- Aimee La Joie, B.A. 2012 – actress (Freedom, Wisconsin, Hemet, or the Landlady Don't Drink Tea) and TikToker (The Film Crew)
- Adam Lamberg (Class of 2006) – actor (Lizzie McGuire)
- Sanaa Lathan, B.A. 1992 – actress (Blade [1998], Something New [2006]; Tony Award nomination [2004], Raisin in the Sun)
- David Lee, B.A. 2004 – fashion and celebrity photographer
- Quentin Lee, B.A. 1992 – Asian-American film director (Shopping for Fangs [1997], Drift [2001], Ethan Mao [2004])
- Will Yun Lee, B.A. 1993 – actor (The Wolverine)
- Young Jean Lee, B.A. 1996, Ph.D. candidate 2000–2005 – OBIE Award-winning playwright and director of experimental theater
- Christopher Maclaine, B.A. 1946 – filmmaker and poet
- Johnny Manahan, B.A. 1969 – Filipino film and television director, writer, and actor; head executive of the training and management subsidiary of ABS-CBN Corporation, Star Magic
- Joshua Marston, B.A. 1990 – film director (Maria Full of Grace [2004])
- Quinn Martin, B.A. 1949 – television producer (The Fugitive, The Streets of San Francisco)
- Charles Martinet (attended) – voice actor, former voice of Mario, Luigi, Wario, and Waluigi in the Super Mario series
- Jerry Mathers, B.A. 1974 – actor (Leave it to Beaver)
- Errol Morris (attended 1973–1975) – documentary film director (The Thin Blue Line [1988], Fog of War [2003])
- Barry Nelson, B.A. 1941 – stage and screen actor who was the first to portray James Bond in a television adaptation of Casino Royale
- Shirin Neshat, B.A. 1979, M.F.A. 1982 – Iranian-American filmmaker, video artist, and photographer; 1999 Venice Biennale First Prize winner
- Marc Norman, B.A. 1962, M.A. 1964 – screenwriter, novelist, and playwright, recipient of the Academy Award for Best Original Screenplay (shared with Tom Stoppard) and Academy Award for Best Picture (as co-producer) for Shakespeare in Love (1999)
- Sammy Obeid, degree in business and mathematics – stand-up comedian who has appeared on America's Got Talent and Conan
- Paula Patton (transferred to University of Southern California) – actress, Mission: Impossible – Ghost Protocol and Precious
- Gregory Peck, B.A. 1939 – actor, Academy Award winner and Golden Globe winner (To Kill a Mockingbird, Gentleman's Agreement, Roman Holiday, The Yearling, Twelve O'Clock High)
- David Peoples, BA English – screenwriter (the Ridley Scott film Blade Runner and the Terry Gilliam film 12 Monkeys), nominated for the Academy Award for Best Screenplay for the Clint Eastwood film Unforgiven (which did win the Academy Award for Best Picture); collaborator with Jon Else on the Academy Award-winning documentary Who Are the DeBolts? And Where Did They Get Nineteen Kids? and the Academy Award-nominated documentary The Day After Trinity
- Chris Pine, B.A. 2002, English literature – actor (Star Trek, Wonder Woman, Hell or High Water, The Princess Diaries 2, Smokin' Aces)
- Ed Quinn, B.A. 1991, History – actor (Eureka, 2 Broke Girls)
- Loren L. Ryder, 1924 – sound engineer; winner of five Academy Awards
- Atsushi Sakahara MBA 2000 – Palme d'Or 2001 (associate producer) and IDA shortlisted (director/producer)
- James Schamus, B.A. 1982, M.A. 1987, Ph.D. 2003 – screenwriter and movie producer
- Jonathan Schwartz, B.A., in rhetoric – movie producer and former entertainment lawyer
- Elizabeth Sher, B.A. 1964, M.A. 1967 – documentary and short filmmaker and artist
- Laura Shigihara, degree in international relations and business – lead composer and sound designer for the tower defense game Plants vs. Zombies; creator of the indie RPG Rakuen
- Brett Simon, M.F.A. 2002, Ph.D. 2003 – director, Assassination of a High School President
- Ryan Simpkins (attended) – actress (The House, Brigsby Bear)
- Randi Mayem Singer, B.A. 1979 – writer and producer, Mrs. Doubtfire, Jack and Jill
- Brenda Song, studied psychology and business B.A. 2009 - actress, The Suite Life of Zack & Cody, Wendy Wu: Homecoming Warrior
- Gloria Stuart, studied philosophy and drama (enrolled 1928–1930) – actress and artist, known for her roles in The Invisible Man (1933) and Titanic (1997)
- George Takei (transferred to UCLA) – actor, Star Trek, Star Trek: The Original Series
- Brian Tee, B.A. 1999 – actor
- Nancy Tellem, B.A. 1975 – president of CBS Paramount Television Network Entertainment Group
- Sophie Treadwell, B.Litt. 1906 – playwright, known for Machinal; journalist
- Scott Trimble, B.A. 1999 – location scout and location manager (Transformers, Star Trek, Iron Man 2)
- Morgan Webb, B.A. 2001 – host of X-Play
- Audrey Wells, B.A. 1981 – screenwriter (The Truth About Cats & Dogs [1996]) and director (Under the Tuscan Sun [2003])
- Haskell Wexler (attended) – cinematographer, two-time Academy Award winner, and five-time nominee (Who's Afraid of Virginia Woolf?, Bound for Glory and One Flew Over the Cuckoo's Nest)
- Timothy Wheeler, director, producer, cinematographer
- Aaron Woolfolk, B.A. 1992 – film director, screenwriter, The Harimaya Bridge
- Charles Yu, B.S. 1997 – screenwriter and TV writer of shows such as Westworld, Here and Now, Lodge 49, Legion, Sorry for Your Loss and Dream Corp, LLC

== See also ==
- List of University of California, Berkeley faculty
- UC Berkeley School of Law
