= Martha Tedeschi =

American art historian and curator

- Born: Martha P. Tedeschi; April 1, 1958 (age 68)
- Occupations: Art historian Curator
- Spouse: Michael Lukasiewicz
- Children: 2 (Samuel and Jacob)

Academic background
- Education: Brown University; University of Michigan; Northwestern University
- Thesis: How Prints Work: Reproductions, Originals, and Their Markets in England, 1840–1900 (1994)
- Academic advisors: S. Hollis Clayson; Nancy J. Troy

Academic work
- Discipline: Art history
- Sub-discipline: Nineteenth-century American and British prints and drawings
- Institutions: Art Institute of Chicago; Harvard Art Museums

Martha P. Tedeschi (born April 1, 1958) is an American art historian and curator. Tedeschi served as the Elizabeth and John Moors Cabot Director of the Harvard Art Museums from 2016-2024. She is a scholar of nineteenth-century American and British prints and drawings, especially works by artists such as Winslow Homer, John Marin, and James McNeill Whistler.

== Career ==
Born to John and Anne, Tedeschi received a Bachelor of Arts in Art History from Brown University in 1980, and a Master of Arts in Art History and Museum Studies from the University of Michigan in 1982. Her thesis at Michigan focused on Girolamo Mocetto and was titled "The Calumny of Appelles: An Early Sixteenth-Century Engraving by Girolamo Mocetto." In 1994, Tedeschi received a Doctor of Philosophy in Art History from Northwestern University. Her dissertation, supervised by S. Hollis Clayson and Nancy J. Troy, was titled "How Prints Work: Reproductions, Originals, and Their Markets in England, 1840–1900."

In 1999, Tedeschi was named the Prince Trust Curator of Prints and Drawings at the Art Institute of Chicago. In 2012, she was promoted to Deputy Director for Art and Research. Four years later, she was named the Elizabeth and John Moors Cabot Director of the Harvard Art Museums, succeeding Thomas W. Lentz.

Tedeschi is a member of the Association of Art Museum Curators, the Association of Art Museum Directors, and has served as President of the Print Council of America from 2009 through 2013. She has published extensively within the academic journal Print Quarterly.

== Personal life ==
Tedeschi is married to Michael Lukasiewicz, with whom she has two children: Samuel and Jacob.

== Select works ==
- Great Drawings from the Art Institute of Chicago: The Harold Joachim Years, 1958–1983, 1985, ISBN 9780933920699
- The Lithographs of James McNeill Whistler, with Nesta Spink, 1998, ISBN 9780865591509
- The "Writing" of Modern Life: The Etching Revival in France, Britain, and U.S., 1850-1940, with Elizabeth Helsinger, 2008, ISBN 9780935573459
- Watercolors by Winslow Homer: The Color of Light, with Kristi Dahm et al., 2008, ISBN 9780865592261
- John Marin's Watercolors: A Medium for Modernism, with Kristi Dahm et al., 2010, ISBN 9780300166378
- Coming Away: Winslow Homer and England, with Elizabeth Athens et al., 2017, ISBN 9780300229905

== See also ==
- List of Brown University alumni
- List of female art museum directors
- List of Northwestern University alumni
- List of University of Michigan arts alumni

Preceded by Thomas W. Lentz	Elizabeth and John Moors Cabot Director; Harvard Art Museums; 2016 – present	Incumbent
