= Connie Wang =

Connie Wang may refer to:

- Connie Wang (writer)
- Connie Wang (actress)
