= Bodies in Motion =

Bodies in Motion may refer to one of the following:

- A television fitness show hosted by Gilad Janklowicz
- An episode of CSI: Crime Scene Investigation (season 6)
- A book about motorcycling by Steven L. Thompson
