= Rod Beaton =

Rod Beaton may refer to:

- Rod Beaton (news executive) (1923–2002), American news executive and journalist
- Rod Beaton (sportswriter) (1951–2011), American sportswriter and journalist
- Roderick Beaton (born 1951), British academic
