= Wild Blue =

Wild Blue or The Wild Blue may refer to:

== Literature ==
- The Wild Blue: The Novel of the U.S. Air Force, 1986 book by Walter J. Boyne and Steven L. Thompson
- The Wild Blue, 2001 book by Stephen Ambrose about B-24 bombers

== Music ==
- Wild Blue (Part I), 2019 album by Hunter Hayes
- "Wild Blue", 2021 song by John Mayer from the album Sob Rock

== Other Uses ==
- WildBlue, a two-way satellite ISP subdivision of ViaSat
- Wild Blue, a restaurant on the 107th floor of the North Tower of the World Trade Center
