= Thomas W. Lentz =

American art historian and curator (born 1951)

- Born: Thomas Woodward Lentz Jr. June 11, 1951 (age 75); California, United States
- Occupations: Art historian Curator
- Spouse: Mary Pfeifer

Academic background
- Education: Claremont McKenna College; Harvard University; University of California, Berkeley
- Thesis: Painting at Herat under Bāysunghur ibn Shāhrukh (1985)

Academic work
- Discipline: Art history
- Sub-discipline: Islamic art
- Institutions: Rhode Island School of Design Museum; Los Angeles County Museum of Art; Smithsonian Institution; Harvard Art Museums

Thomas "Tom" Woodward Lentz Jr. (born June 11, 1951) is an American art historian and curator. Lentz served as the Elizabeth and John Moors Cabot Director of the Harvard Art Museums from 2003 to 2015. He was the ninth director in its history.

== Career ==
A native of California, Lentz received a Bachelor of Arts in Art History from Claremont McKenna College in 1974. He continued at the University of California, Berkeley receiving a Master of Arts in Near Eastern Studies in 1978. Lentz then received a Master of Arts and a Doctor of Philosophy in Art History from Harvard University in 1981 and 1985, respectively. His studies focused on Islamic art, and more specifically, on Persian painting. Lentz wrote his doctoral dissertation under Oleg Grabar on the "Painting at Herat under Bāysunghur ibn Shāhrukh."

In 1982, while studying at Harvard, Lentz was hired to his first role as Curator of Asian Art at the Rhode Island School of Design Museum, a post that he held until 1984. He then moved to the Los Angeles County Museum of Art as Curator of Egyptian, Islamic, and West Asian Art. In 1992, Lentz accepted his first directorial position as assistant director of the Freer Gallery of Art and the Arthur M. Sackler Gallery, both at the Smithsonian Institution. Three years later, he was promoted to deputy director, and then to acting director. In 2000, he officially became Director of the International Art Museums.

In 2003, Lentz was named the Elizabeth and John Moors Cabot Director of the Harvard Art Museums, becoming the ninth director in its history and succeeding James Cuno. During the directorship, Lentz guided the museum through a major renovation, led by the architect Renzo Piano. In 2007, Lentz was elected a member of the American Academy of Arts and Sciences. In 2015, he stepped down from his post as director.

== Select works ==
- Architecture in Islamic Painting: Permanent and Impermanent Worlds, with Michele A. De Angelis, 1982, ISBN 0916724514
- Timur and the Princely Vision: Persian Art and Culture in the Fifteenth Century, 1989, ISBN 978-0874747065
- Beyond the Legacy: Anniversary Acquisitions for the Freer Gallery of Art and the Arthur M. Sackler Gallery, with Thomas Lawton, 1999, ISBN 978-0295979083

== See also ==
- List of American Academy of Arts and Sciences members (2006–2019)
- List of Harvard University people
- List of people from California
- List of University of California, Berkeley alumni in arts and media

Preceded by James Cuno	Elizabeth and John Moors Cabot Director; Harvard Art Museums; 2003 – 2015	Succeeded by Martha Tedeschi
