= Honor Bound (1988 film) =

- Home video cover under the title Red End
- Directed by: Jeannot Szwarc
- Written by: Aiken Woodruff
- Based on: Recovery by Steven L. Thompson
- Produced by: Boris Dmitrovic; Jean Gontier; Daniel Marquet; Michel Roy; Tim Van Rellim; Patrick Wells; Eric Weymueller
- Starring: Tom Skerritt; John Philbin
- Cinematography: Robert M. Stevens
- Edited by: John Jympson
- Music by: Mark Shreeve
- Production companies: Film Accord; Jadran Film; TCA
- Distributed by: Ascot Video
- Release date: October 6, 1988
- Running time: 98 minutes
- Countries: United States; Yugoslavia
- Language: English

Honor Bound (also known as Red End) is a 1988 film directed by Jeannot Szwarc.

== Cast ==
- John Philbin as Sgt. Max Young
- Tom Skerritt as Col. Sam Cahill
- George Dzundza as Sergeant Major Wocjinski
- Relja Bašić as General Gorodnikov
- Janez Vajavec as Colonel Ilyushin
- Michael Hofland as Gunther Stahl
- Zdenko Jelčić as Gurkov
- Richard D. Sharp as Sgt. Ray Tanner
- Gene Davis as Sgt. Chester Wind River
- Gabrielle Lazure as Erika Tyler
- Angus MacInnes as Jessup
- Burnell Tucker as Steele
- Lawrence Pressman as General Maxwell

== Production ==
The movie was filmed in Berlin, Germany, and Yugoslavia.
