= Escalon, California =

City in California, United States

- City
- City of Escalon
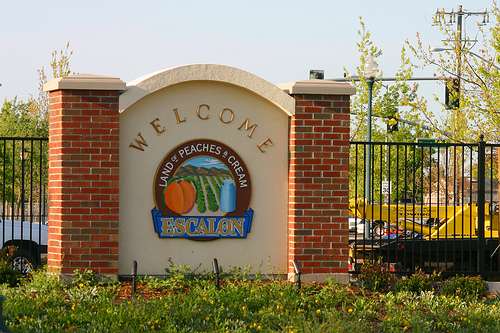
- Escalon, Land of Peaches and Cream, welcome sign

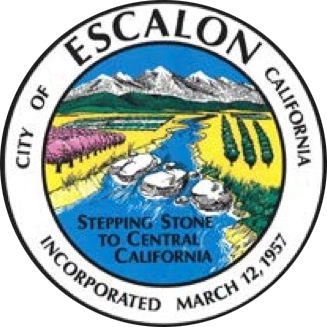
- Seal
- Interactive map of Escalon, California
- Location within California Location within the United States
- Coordinates: 37°47.5′N 120°59.5′W
- Country: United States
- State: California
- County: San Joaquin
- Incorporated: March 12, 1957

Government
  - Mayor: Dave Bellinger
  - Senate: Jerry McNerney (D)
  - Assembly: Heath Flora (R)
  - U. S. Congress: Josh Harder (D)

Area
  - Total: 2.34 sq mi (6.07 km^{2})
  - Land: 2.28 sq mi (5.90 km^{2})
  - Water: 0.066 sq mi (0.17 km^{2}) 2.87%
- Elevation: 118 ft (36 m)

Population (2020)
  - Total: 7,472
  - Density: 3,280/sq mi (1,266.4/km^{2})
- Time zone: UTC-08:00 (PST)
  - Summer (DST): UTC-07:00 (PDT)
- ZIP code: 95320
- Area code: 209
- FIPS code: 06-22790
- GNIS feature ID: 1656002
- Website: escalon.gov

Escalon (Spanish: Escalón, meaning "Step") is a city in San Joaquin County, California, United States. The population was 7,472 at the 2020 census, up from 7,132 at the 2010 census and 5,963 at the 2000 census. Escalon is a Spanish word meaning "stepping stones." Founder John Wheeler Jones is said to have come upon the name in a book in the Stockton Free Library and liked it so much that he gave it to the town.

== History ==
Before the advent of the railroad, the traveler in riding over the French Camp road to the Stanislaus River would notice far out on the plains a large two-story brick house. It was surrounded by trees and shrubs, barns, granaries, and was the only house for miles around. It was the home of "Johnny" Jones, who crossed the plains in 1852 and pitched his tent where Escalon now stands, the country at that time being Government land covered with sage brush. He acquired the amount of land allotted to settlers and started to farm it, planting the first grain ever grown in the Escalon country. He seeded it by broadcast and dragged it in with brush. The yield was heavy and sold for five cents a pound.

He began raising cattle for market and purchased more land until he owned 8,000 acres, a tract more than three miles square. Six to twelve-horse teams were used to plow the fields where Escalon was later developed. In 1867 Jones built his brick house on the prairie, at a cost of $12,000. His brother Richard made the bricks from a field east of Sexton station. In those days all freight carried from Stockton to the mines above Sonora went via the French Camp road, and many of the teamsters boarded and lodged at his farm. The plains were the homes of many antelope, which Jones often served on his table.

Escalon is a Spanish word meaning stepping stones. James W. Jones, the founder of the town, is said to have seen the name in a book in the Stockton Free Library and gave it to the town because he liked it. His father died in 1893, leaving quite a fortune. He willed the old home place to James W., together with the adjoining 1,000 acres. The land was not of any great value, but became more valuable the following year with the construction of the Valley Railroad, whose owners planned to cross Jones's land. Jones engaged a surveyor and laid off the town. The boundary lines run nearly north, south, east and west, but the streets run diagonally, so some blocks are square, others oblong, some are rectangular and several blocks are triangular in shape.

John McGinnis, in recording some of the first events in Escalon says, "In the month of August, 1894, I was accosted, in Stockton, by a promoter of the townsite, Mr. Harlon, and was prevailed upon to make the trip to Escalon. The four-horse stage was brought forward by the hostler and James Jones, popularly called 'Jim, 'took the ribbons. Leaving there about 9:00 o'clock A. M., driving out the old French Camp Road, we arrived at the Jones home place, the brick house, about noon. With hospitality, an attribute of the Jones family, we sat down to a feast, fit for a king, and did full justice to it. We afterwards walked over and viewed the townsite, east of the then only graded roadbed. It was graded by a railroad company called the 'Valley Road.' We then passed, through a thrifty vineyard, the very first vines to be propagated by Johnny Jones — 'Jim's' father. We then passed the Jones' blacksmith shop just east, across the road from where the Tidewater depot used to be located. I again visited Escalon in 1900. There was then a depot, a store had been built but had not opened for business, the pioneer saloon, and. a temporary hotel on the Jackson property, also used as a dwelling and post office, Mrs. Jackson being postmistress."

As soon as the town was surveyed, Jones built a good-sized hotel to accommodate the prospective buyers who came by stage from Stockton, which was located about where the Presbyterian Church now stands. The first Santa Fe train rolled into Escalon in the spring of 1896. The post office and the first store were started by Mrs. Charles Jordan, wife of the station agent, on ground now occupied by the Tuolumne Lumber Company. The second store was built by merchant Nelson Leighton; it was a large two-story building facing the railroad. The hall on the second floor was used for social functions. Leighton's store had the first telephone switchboard in Escalon. The first warehouse was built by David L. Jones and John A. Coley in 1897, and another was built later by Haslacher & Kahn, of Oakdale. The first long-distance telephone was installed in John Coley's residence. He was the first real estate agent and grain dealer in the town, and built many of the dwellings for rent and sale.

The Escalon Commercial Club, formerly known as the Escalon Board of Trade, was organized March 11, 1911, with the following officers: A. St. John, president; C. H. Sheldon, vice-president; H. L. MacPherson, secretary; and R. N. Haines, treasurer. They carried out successfully a Fourth of July celebration in 1913, were active in the formation of the irrigation district, saw the Union high school erected, installed a lighting system; succeeded in getting the supervisors to lay some splendid streets, the town not being incorporated, and held a successful community fair in 1917. The following are the past officers of the club elected in June 1912: H. L. MacPherson, president; S. J. Irvin, vice-president; O. A. Fish, secretary; and W. F. Searcy, treasurer; September 8, 1914, H. L. MacPherson, president; J. H. Martin, vice-president; E. AV. Bidwell, secretary; A. Kerr, treasurer; October 16, 1916, H. L,. MacPherson, president; E. W. Bidwell, vice-president; H. L. Morgensen, secretary; and Dr. J. M. Carr, treasurer; March 10, 1917, John R. Martin, president; S. R. King, vice-president; H. A. Bierschal, secretary; and C. Moorehead, treasurer.

The school was first opened near the celebrated lone tree as early as 1878. It was in session six months of the year, with an enrollment of 31 boys and girls, with an average attendance of 15 pupils. After the founding of Escalon, the school district was divided, and a new district school started in the new town. The trustees of the new district, two of them, AV. A. Owens and J. A. Coley, succeeded in getting the people to bond the district for a small sum and the money was used in purchasing a lot in 1903 and erecting a two-room schoolhouse. The first teacher, Miss Stella Reynolds, had formerly taught at the Lone Tree school. The school has had a steady and substantial growth during its first decade and in 1914 it was found necessary to provide larger accommodations for the pupils. The citizens voted for more bonds, the present grammar school grounds were purchased and a handsome building was constructed of hollow tile. The number of students continued to increase and last year an additional four class rooms were built' at a cost of $18,000. The entire building was then covered with mastic. One, of the features of the additional rooms was an assembly hall seating about 400 persons which can be used as a public auditorium. Mrs. Grace Taylor Pearce has been principal for the past nine years and under her administration the school has been placed on the accredited list of the county.

In 1916, residents decided they wanted a high school; this was a relatively new addition to public schools. says Prof. Oliver E. Irons, that the citizens realized the necessity of a high school. The Escalon Commercial Club led the campaign to approve bonds for funding. The proposition was defeated by three votes, but in 1919 a second bond campaign was passed. A five-member school board was quickly elected: AV. L. Cooms, C. A. Smith, H. L. Morgansen, Otto Peterson, and H. H. McKinney.

The Jones club house was secured and school started in September with Mr. F. AA. Denny and Mrs. A. Cowan as instructors. Mrs. Cowan resigned in mid-year and her place was taken by Miss Orr. The total enrollment the first year was thirty-five. In the second year the enrollment of seventy-five pupils overtaxed the seating capacity of the club house. Citizens of the district voted for a bond of $85,000 for suitable high school rooms. The building was completed early this year with the following teachers in charge : Oliver E. Irons, principal; Paul B. Boehnecke, Miss Nydia Jensen, Miss Minnie Smith, Miss Ruth Williams, and Miss Stella Barnett, under whose able instructions all classes are progressing rapidly.

The Methodist Church was the first church in Escalon. The church was organized in the Lone Tree section in 1893, during the pastorate of the Rev. John Stevens, later for five years pastor of the Central Methodist church of Stockton. While the church was at Lone Tree Corners, it was on a circuit with Farmington, Atlanta, Riverbank and Oakdale. It remained at Lone Tree Corners until September 1908, when the building was moved to Escalon. This building stood until being replaced by a new structure, completed and dedicated on Sunday, April 10, 1921. Since then, the following pastors have been appointed here: U. L. Walker, L. H. Sanborn, Luther Speers, Smith, McWilliams, A. Z. Bose, S. L. Lee, G. W. Grannis, L. H. Jenkins and C. G. Zierk.

The Evangelical Lutheran Church was organized November 15, 1909, by the Rev. Phillip Andreen of San Francisco, assisted by David Magunson of Stockton. Subscriptions were obtained in November 1911 and a building was erected, just west of the old school house in 1913. It was dedicated in the summer of the following year, 1914. The following pastors have been in charge, the Rev. W. X. Magnuson, 1912, Dr. P. E. Berg,. 1913; Rev: C. Anderson, 1916; Rev. N. P. Anseen, 1921 : Rev. O. W. Westhng-, 1922.

The Presbyterian Church was organized November 10, 1913, with the following charter members : Mr. and Mrs. Wm. Campbell, Miss Margaret Campbell, Miss Helen Campbell, Mr. S. H. Irwin, Mrs. Minerva H. Erwin, Mr. and Mrs. E. W. Bidwell, Mrs. O. A. Fisk, Miss Leona Kelley, Miss Hazel Delley, Mr. and Mrs. E. A. Clough, Mrs. J. G. Voorhies. Of the original members, ten remain and are living in and around Escalon, three have moved away, and one is deceased. Services were first held in the Community hall, but in 1915 the trustees purchased the pioneer gram- mar school building and fitted it up for church purposes. The first pastor. Rev. E. B. David- son, served until October 1, 1915, and during the succeeding two months the pulpit was occupied by the Rev. A. M. Wood, then the Rev. I. B. Surface was pastor until December 1, 1916. In March 1917, the Rev. A. L. Bone took charge and was installed the following year.

Escalon came into being in the late 1800s because of the agricultural production in the immediate area and the need to get the products of that agriculture to market by railroad. John Wheeler Jones settled here with his family in the 1850s, and his son, James Wesley Jones, laid out the community of Escalon 40-plus years later. Although Escalon was incorporated in 1957, and celebrated its 50-year anniversary in 2007 by proclamation of Escalon's city council, 1994 was officially acknowledged as the year to celebrate the Escalon centennial.

In 1898, the Santa Fe Depot was constructed (along the San Francisco and San Joaquin Valley Railroad line) and operated until 1970. It was located alongside the Santa Fe Railroad Tracks that bisect the heart of Escalon near Main Street's intersections with Second Street.

In 1909, Oliver A. Fisk began construction on the Fisk Building, completing it in 1911. This building is still located at the corner of Main and First Streets in its modified form. The first business to occupy this building was the Escalon State Bank, the first bank in town, in 1912. The bank was established by S.J. Irwin, the owner of the Irwin Lumber Company.

== Transportation ==
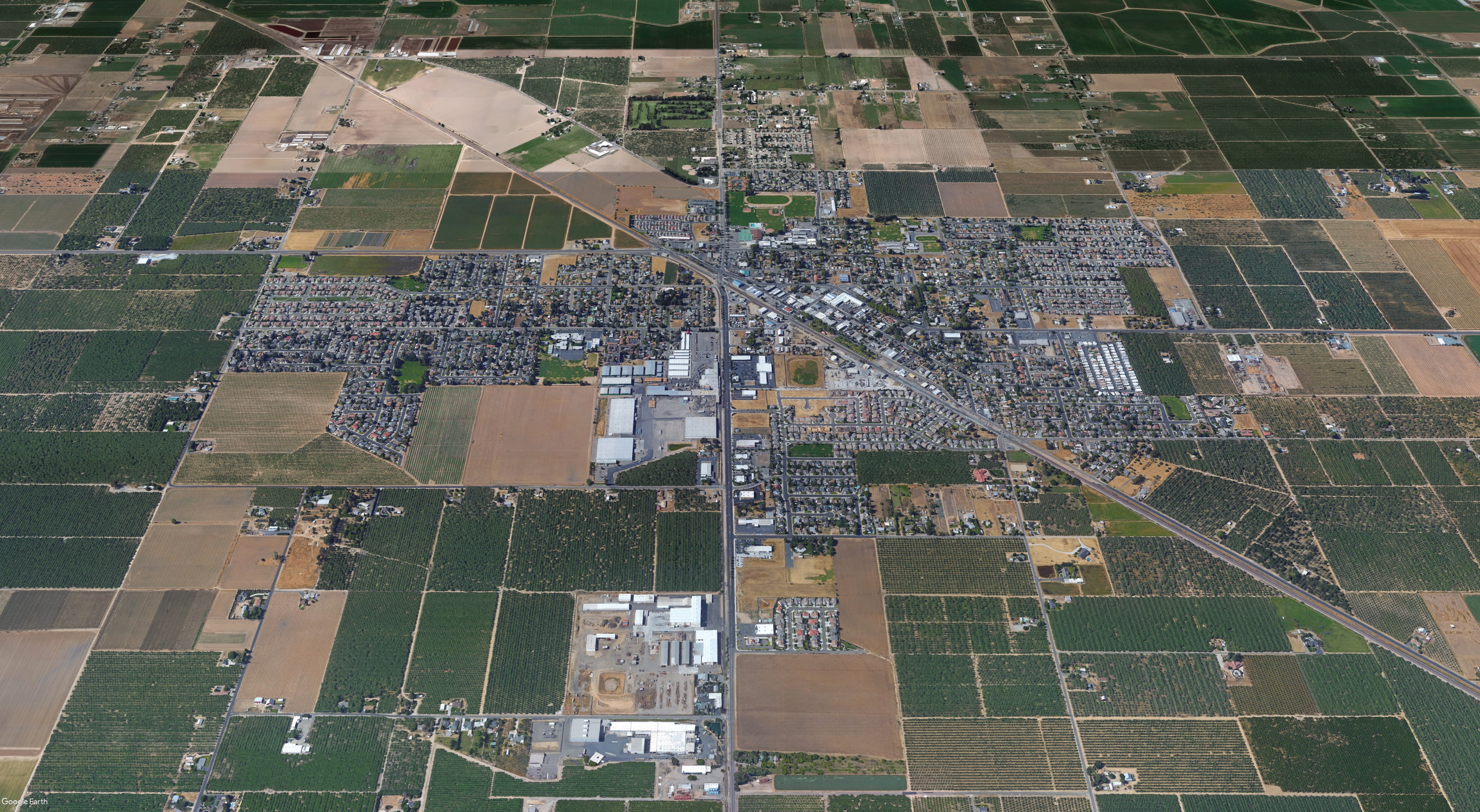
Aerial view of Escalon.

=== Highways and Roads ===
California State Route 120 runs through Escalon connecting it to the Bay Area and to the west through Oakdale where it merges with California State Route 108 to the Sierra Nevada. McHenry Avenue runs south towards Modesto crossing the Stanislaus River over the newly rebuilt McHenry Bridge. Escalon currently has 4 stoplights in town all within a 1/4 mile proximity.

==== Future development ====
South McHenry Avenue: This project will widen the road from two lanes to three lanes from Narcissus Way to Jones Road (3300 lineal feet). The improvements will include pavement widening and curb and gutter on the east side. The need for right of way will not be determined until the design phase. This project is awaiting approval in 2030 for completion by 2036

Ullrey Ave./ McHenry Ave. Traffic Signal: design and construction of a signal at the intersection of McHenry nd Ullrey avenues.

SR 120 at Brennan Avenue In 2020 $446,066 was approved for intersection improvements, no traffic signal. The project is slated for completion in 2026.

Escalon Bellota Road Improvements Widen 2 to 4 lanes with shoulders from Escalon City limits to Mariposa Road. Project is estimated to be completed by 2025.

Caltrans Intercity Rail Construct double main track, panelized turnouts, relocate/renew siding turnout, and realign existing track. From Stockton to Escalon. No estimated completion date.

French Camp at Hwy 120 Roundabout The 2020 SHOPP, approved in May 2020, included the following Collision Reduction item of interest, Route 120 near Manteca, at French Camp Road. Construct roundabout. Programmed in FY23-24, with construction scheduled to start in December 2024. Total project cost is $16,204K, with $10,536K being capital.

=== Railroads ===
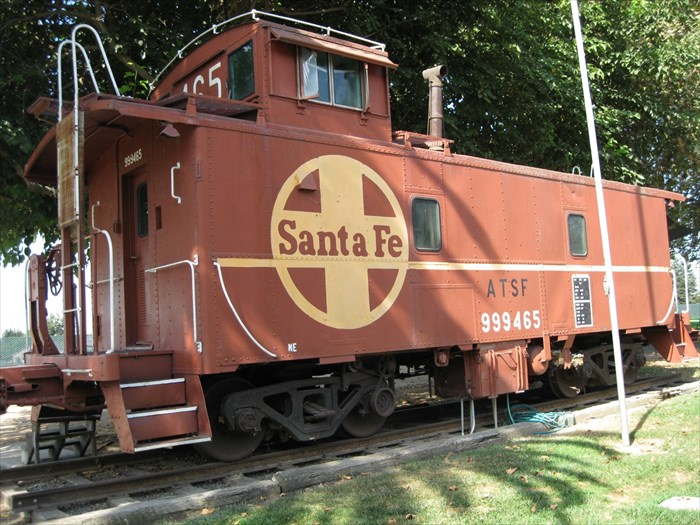
This Atchison, Topeka and Santa Fe Railroad caboose is located in Escalon's Main Street Park and owned by the Escalon Historical Society. The caboose sits very near the spot where the Santa Fe depot was erected as one of the new town's first buildings in the late 1890s. The first train passed through Escalon in 1896.

Escalon has two railways through town. The former Tidewater Southern Railway comes west from Manteca parallel to Highway 120 until it hits McHenry Avenue and heads south out of town. This railway is owned and operated by Union Pacific Railroad and is still in use today, though the tracks end at the city limits of Jones Avenue.

BNSF Railway Stockton Subdivision is the second railway; it has two tracks, dividing the town in a northwest to southeast direction. Two trains will meet and pass on opposing rails through town, often backing up traffic along Highway 120 for over 20–30 mins. The Santa Fe Railway San Francisco Chief served Escalon as a flag stop until 1971, when it ended passenger rail service to the town.

== Geography ==
Escalon is located at 37°47.5'N 120°59.5'W (37.7984,-120.9969), where State Highway 120 crosses the BNSF railroad. According to the United States Census Bureau, the city has a total area of 2.3 square miles (6.0 km^{2}). 2.3 square miles (6.0 km^{2}) of it is land and 2.87% is water.

== Economy ==
=== Industry ===
Escalon has a large agricultural industry which is based on the fertile farmland surrounding the city. Escalon is home to one of the largest walnut processing facilities in the world, DeRuosi Nut. DeRuosi Nut is also a major handler of the Livermore variety of red walnuts, a cultivar developed in the San Joaquin Valley. Some of the largest employers in Escalon include DeRuosi Nut, GoldRiver Orchards, Grower's Choice, and Roche Bros Inc. The nut processing plants account for much of the local agricultural economy.

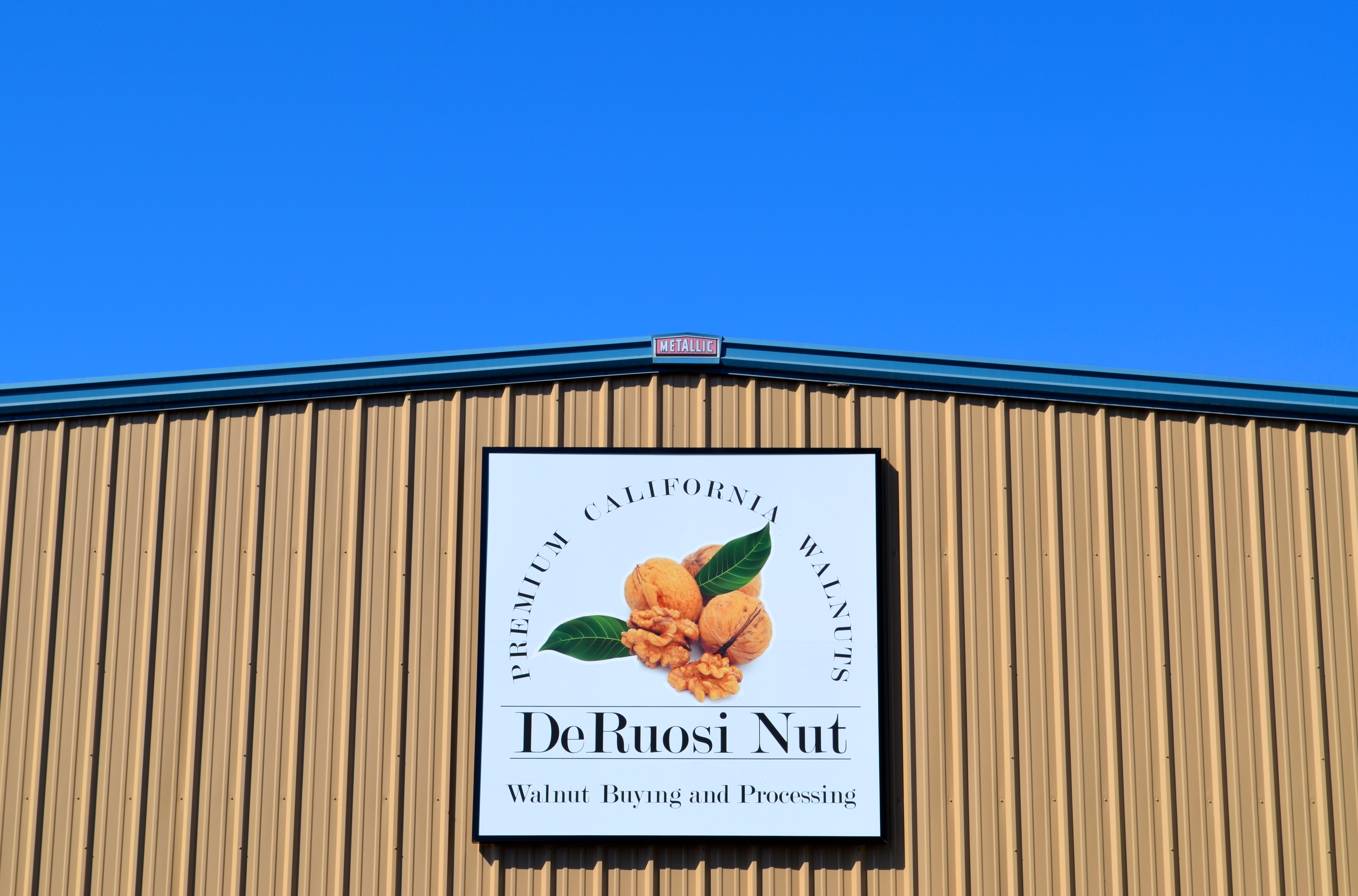
DeRuosi Nut Headquarters

=== Principal employers ===
Major employers in the city include:

#	Employer	# of Employees
1	Kraft Heinz (formerly Escalon Premier Brands)	750
2	Hogan Mfg., Inc.	160
3	DeRuosi Nut	124
4	GoldRiver Orchards	
5	Barton Ranch	
6	Roche Bros Inc.	
7	Grower's Choice	

== Downtown (Main St.) ==
Escalon's downtown along Main St. has been a focal point of the town since inception. Today the strip boasts restaurants, a salon, a bar, and many local family-run businesses. Since the late 20th century, Main Street has been the subject of redevelopment led by local businessman, Mike DeRuosi. The Valley Inn, the town's only bar, is known as one of the longest running bars in California. The bar has been a center of town life since its early years.

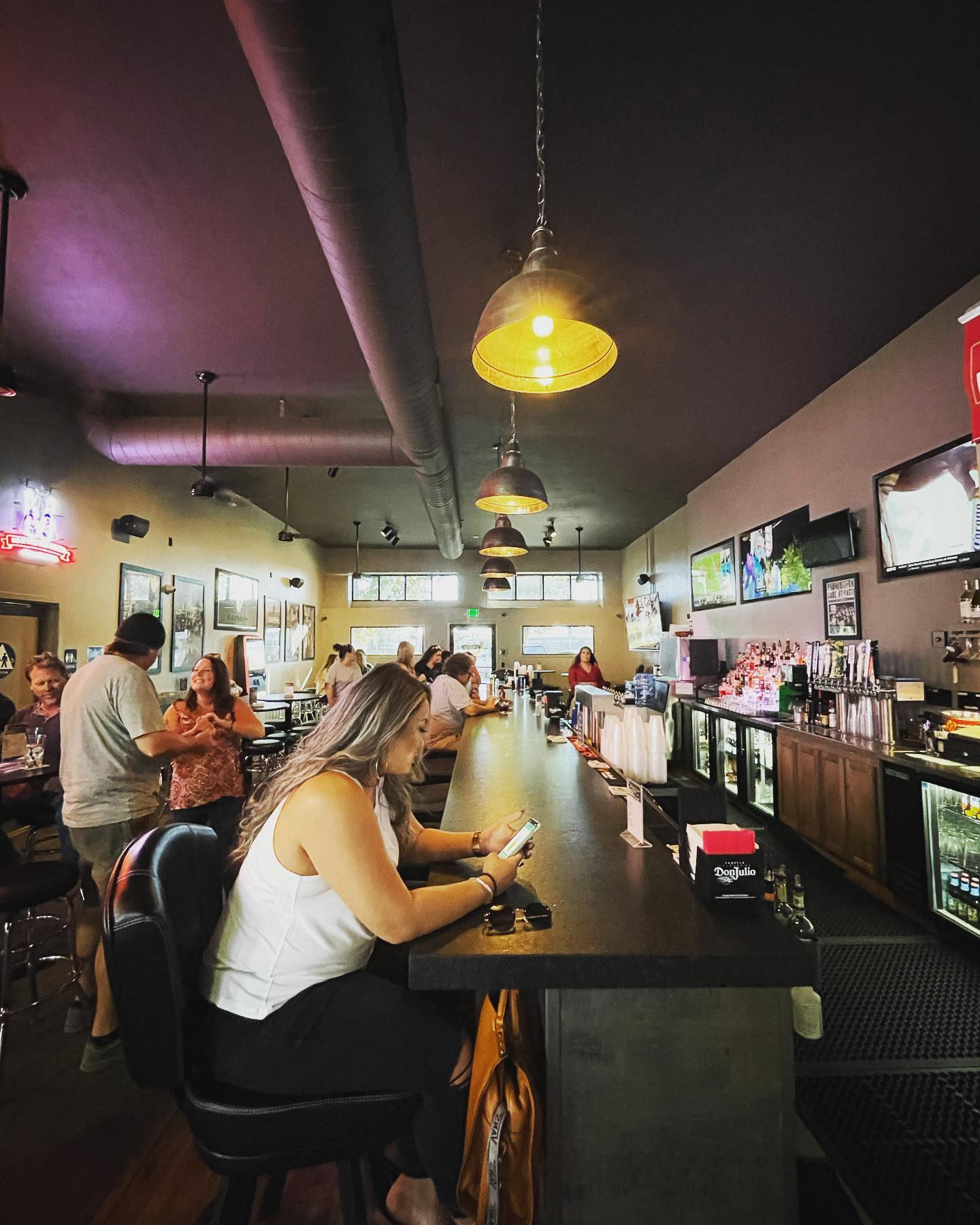
Valley Inn - Escalon's Bar

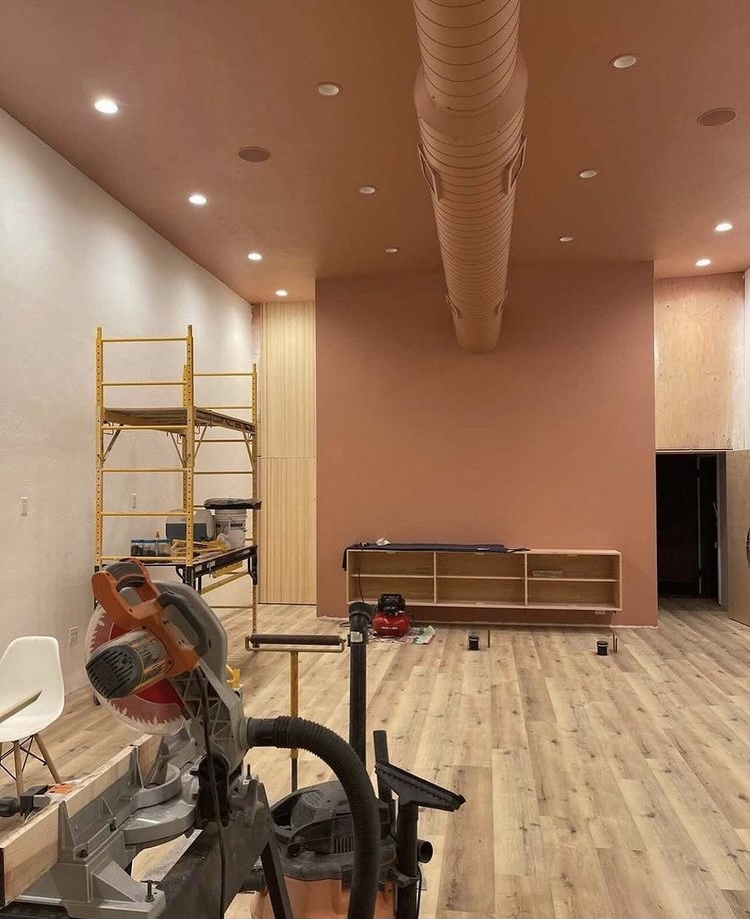
New Main Street Salon

== Police ==
Escalon's Police Department has 12 full-time employees. It also has volunteers who serve in the capacity of Police Reserve Officers, Cadets, and Citizen Volunteers.

== Education ==
In 1963, representatives from eight component districts (Burwood, Collegeville, Dent Union, Escalon Union High, Farmington, Four Tree, Lone Tree, and Van Allen) began a series of six meetings commissioned by their component boards to explore the concept of creating one unified school district to serve the educational needs of these districts. They recommended to the County Superintendent of Schools that the eight districts form a unified district. The San Joaquin County Board of Education approved this proposal in October 1964.

On February 24, 1965, a public hearing was held on the proposal in the Escalon High School library. An election day of March 8, 1966, was designated by County Superintendent Gaylord Nelson. Voters approved the unification and on March 15, 1966, the San Joaquin Board of Supervisors created what would soon become the Escalon Unified School District, effective July 1, 1967.

The Escalon Unified School District is made up of 4 elementary schools (Collegeville Dual Language Immersion, Dent, Farmington and Van Allen), one middle school (El Portal), one comprehensive high school (Escalon High), one continuation high school (Vista), and one charter school (Escalon Charter Academy/Gateway Home School).

=== Schools ===
- Escalon High
- Vista High
- El Portal Middle
- Dent Elementary
- Van Allen Elementary
- Farmington Elementary
- Collegeville Elementary
- Escalon Charter Academy

== Sports ==
The Escalon High Cougars represent the local high school in the Trans Valley League, in which they are founding members. The Escalon High Varsity football team has enjoyed numerous success over the years. Winning five State Championships in the past 30 years and two within the last 3 seasons. The Cougars rank 31st in the state of California among all divisions for their wins, with a record of 590-282-43 as of the end of the 2022 season.

Head Coaching Wins
Coach	Wins	loss	Ties
Mark Loureiro (1989-2017)	282	67	1
Andrew Beam (2018-)	50	10	0

Titles
Division III	Division IV	Division V	Division VI	State
2 (93, 96)	6 (94, 00, 02, 03, 05, 10)	2 (21, 22)	1 (19)	5 (pre-playoff era: 93, 96/ playoff era: 10, 19, 22)

== Notable people ==
- Rod Beaton – an American journalist and media executive with United Press International
- Herbert A. Calcaterra – WWII US Navy sailor for whom the ship USS Calcaterra was named for his deeds during WWII
- Alice Estes Davis – Disney legend/Costume designer for Disney films, television, and theme parks
- James Lew – American martial arts actor
- Ted Nuce - Retired professional bull rider, 1985 PRCA World Champion Bull Rider

== Churches ==
Escalon is home to 14 churches 12 within city limits. The Escalon Methodist Church has the distinction of being the first church in Escalon, constructed in 1893. The church used to sit at Lone Tree Corners until September 1908, when the building was moved to Escalon. This building stood on site of the present church until it was torn down to make room for the new structure, which was completed and dedicated on Sunday, April 10, 1921.

- Escalon Presbyterian Church
- Escalon Christian Reformed Church
- Escalon Covenant Church
- Trinity Church Assembly of God
- First Baptist Church
- Jackson Avenue Church
- Church of Christ
- Saron Lutheran Church
- United Methodist Church
- Impact Community Church
- Seventh Day Adventist Church
- Pentecostal Tabernacle
- Church of Christ
- Saint Patrick's Catholic Church

== Demographics ==
Historical population
Census	Pop.	Note	%±
1960	1,763		—
1970	2,366		34.2%
1980	3,127		32.2%
1990	4,437		41.9%
2000	5,963		34.4%
2010	7,132		19.6%
2020	7,472		4.8%
U.S. Decennial Census

=== 2020 census ===
As of the 2020 census, Escalon had a population of 7,472. The population density was 3,280.1 inhabitants per square mile (1,266.5/km^{2}).

The census reported that 99.5% of the population lived in households, 0.5% lived in non-institutionalized group quarters, and no one was institutionalized. In addition, 99.6% of residents lived in urban areas, while 0.4% lived in rural areas.

There were 2,634 households in Escalon, of which 37.4% had children under the age of 18 living in them. Of all households, 56.1% were married-couple households, 5.2% were cohabiting-couple households, 14.7% were households with a male householder and no spouse or partner present, and 23.9% were households with a female householder and no spouse or partner present. About 20.4% of all households were made up of individuals and 11.0% had someone living alone who was 65 years of age or older. The average household size was 2.82, and there were 1,961 families (74.4% of all households).

The age distribution was 24.6% under the age of 18, 8.1% aged 18 to 24, 25.6% aged 25 to 44, 24.9% aged 45 to 64, and 16.9% who were 65 years of age or older. The median age was 38.2 years. For every 100 females there were 95.2 males, and for every 100 females age 18 and over there were 93.3 males age 18 and over.

There were 2,711 housing units, of which 2.8% were vacant. The homeowner vacancy rate was 0.8% and the rental vacancy rate was 1.9%. Of occupied housing units, 72.4% were owner-occupied and 27.6% were occupied by renters.

Racial composition as of the 2020 census
Race	Number	Percent
White	4,960	66.4%
Black or African American	37	0.5%
American Indian and Alaska Native	76	1.0%
Asian	133	1.8%
Native Hawaiian and Other Pacific Islander	6	0.1%
Some other race	1,170	15.7%
Two or more races	1,090	14.6%
Hispanic or Latino (of any race)	2,330	31.2%

=== Income and poverty ===
In 2023, the US Census Bureau estimated that the median household income was $86,875, and the per capita income was $55,016. About 9.6% of families and 9.5% of the population were below the poverty line.

=== 2010 census ===
The 2010 United States census reported that Escalon had a population of 7,132. The population density was 3,011.5 inhabitants per square mile (1,162.7/km^{2}). The racial makeup of Escalon was 5,823 (81.6%) White, 30 (0.4%) African American, 80 (1.1%) Native American, 96 (1.3%) Asian, 22 (0.3%) Pacific Islander, 823 (11.5%) from other races, and 258 (3.6%) from two or more races. Hispanic or Latino of any race were 1,928 persons (27.0%).

The Census reported that 7,117 people (99.8% of the population) lived in households, 15 (0.2%) lived in non-institutionalized group quarters, and 0 (0%) were institutionalized.

There were 2,476 households, out of which 975 (39.4%) had children under the age of 18 living in them, 1,484 (59.9%) were married couples living together, 291 (11.8%) had a female householder with no husband present, 143 (5.8%) had a male householder with no wife present. There were 130 (5.3%) unmarried. 469 households (18.9%) were made up of individuals, and 241 (9.7%) had someone living alone who was 65 years of age or older. The average household size was 2.87. There were 1,918 families (77.5% of all households); the average family size was 3.28.

The population was spread out, with 1,933 people (27.1%) under the age of 18, 675 people (9.5%) aged 18 to 24, 1,736 people (24.3%) aged 25 to 44, 1,898 people (26.6%) aged 45 to 64, and 890 people (12.5%) who were 65 years of age or older. The median age was 36.0 years. For every 100 females, there were 96.0 males. For every 100 females age 18 and over, there were 95.2 males.

There were 2,610 housing units at an average density of 1,102.1 per square mile (425.5/km^{2}), of which 1,792 (72.4%) were owner-occupied, and 684 (27.6%) were occupied by renters. The homeowner vacancy rate was 2.5%; the rental vacancy rate was 5.9%. 5,082 people (71.3% of the population) lived in owner-occupied housing units and 2,035 people (28.5%) lived in rental housing units.
