= Oh My Mother! =

2023 memoir by Connie Wang

Oh My Mother!: A Memoir in Nine Adventures
- Author: Connie Wang
- Genre: Memoir, travel
- Publisher: Viking Press
- Publication date: May 9, 2023
- Pages: 240
- ISBN: 978-0593490921

Oh My Mother!: A Memoir in Nine Adventures is a 2023 memoir by Chinese American journalist and writer Connie Wang, published by Viking Press. In nine essays, Connie Wang observes the difficulties and changes she experienced with her mother, Qing Li, while growing up. The memoir was included on several anticipated releases lists and recommended reading lists throughout 2023.

== Contents ==
The memoir has an introduction, prologue, and nine essays. Its accounts, often with regard to traveling, span road trips across the United States, homecomings to China, shopping in Amsterdam, a mother-daughter excursion to a Magic Mike show at the Las Vegas Strip, and more.

Excerpts of the memoir appeared in Thrillist and LitHub. In an essay for Refinery29, where she used to work as an executive editor, Connie Wang shared the process of putting together a book in collaboration with her mother.

== Background ==
In 1988, Li came to the United States to visit her husband, Dexin Wang, who was in the country to complete a doctorate in nanomagnetics at the University of Nebraska. Intending to come back to China, where she worked at a publishing house and raised her daughter who was then named Xiaokang, Li's return was complicated by her husband's public support for the protesters at Tiananmen Square that year. At two years old, Connie moved to America.

In The 19th, Connie Wang discussed the way that identity and self-actualization were understated in her family while growing up. In the United States, the Wang family hardly confronted the question of what it meant to be Asian American. Connie Wang noted their disinterest in Chinatowns, as well as the distance they kept from Korean Americans and Japanese Americans. She also reflected on the "strange phrase" of the term "Asian American" which implied cohesion but did not always appear to manifest it: "There's a lot of resentment and anger and historical feelings between countries and people's own histories in their home countries and outside of it too. And then all of that gets transported when you immigrate."

At age three, Xiaokang Wang renamed herself to Connie Wang after Connie Chung. Later, as an adult, she became a journalist, first working at Glam Media before moving on to Refinery29 where she worked for many years in several positions, eventually culminating in a director role. In May 2023, Connie Wang wrote a piece in The New York Times titled "I Got My Name From Connie Chung. So Did They." about the phenomenon of so many Asian American girls being named Connie. In the piece, she recalled speaking to Chung herself in 2020 who had never known about her name's cultural impact.

The book came about during the COVID-19 pandemic. While Connie Wang had been writing essays about her mother since 2010, it was when she shared book recommendations about immigrant stories with her mother that the idea came about. She particularly wanted to write an immigrant story that was not "sad" but rather reflected a different angle and sentimentality to diaspora narratives. Coinciding with Connie Wang's own introduction to motherhood after the birth of her boy, the conversations that would later comprise the book were both difficult and enlightening:

There was so much I did not know about parenthood, and I was curious ... These conversations were excruciating, embarrassing, and confusing. Many of them ended in tears, and not the heartwarming kind. They took twice as long as they could have, not only because we could only use half of our vocabulary, but also because, this time, we didn't skip over what wasn't clear.

== Critical reception ==
Kirkus Reviews called the book "A creative and entertaining shared memoir of identity, place, and their indelible connection to each other." In a starred review, Booklist said "This charming joint memoir, fact-checked by Qing, is by turns hilarious and touching, and defined by Wang's loving refusal to take her mother, and anything about her, for granted."

KQED noted Wang's "mother's defiant and often hilarious journey as an accidental immigrant who never meant to stay long in America." Datebook observed many highlights in the memoir but said "Alternatively, sometimes it feels like this book can't decide what it wants to be. Some of the essays get sidelined by Wang's kvetching about her childhood."

The book made several lists in 2023. The Washington Post recommended the book in a list of new memoirs. Smithsonian called it one of the best travel books of 2023. Brit + Co recommended it as a new read for 2023. Elle included it on a list of summer reads for 2023. Book Riot called it one of the most anticipated travel books for 2023. Oprah Daily placed it on their list of "The Books We Can't Wait to Read in 2023". Bustle and Zibby Mag named it one of the most anticipated books of spring and summer 2023. Good Morning America and Cup of Jo recommended it in May 2023. PureWow recommended it for 2023 Asian American and Pacific Islander Heritage Month. Similarly, StyleCaster recommended it on a list of must-reads by Asian American authors. Time and Shondaland put the book on their respective lists of Mother's Day reads. Katie Couric Media called it a must-read.
