= John Pollini =

American art historian

- Born: John Pollini; October 15, 1945 (age 80); Boston, Massachusetts, United States
- Occupations: Art historian Archaeologist; Educator
- Spouse: Phyllis Marie Van Neste
- Children: Two

Academic background
- Education: University of Washington; University of California, Berkeley
- Thesis: Studies in Augustan Historical Reliefs (1978)
- Doctoral advisor: Erich S. Gruen

Academic work
- Discipline: Art history
- Sub-discipline: Ancient Rome; Classical archeology
- Institutions: Johns Hopkins University; University of Southern California

John Pollini (born October 15, 1945 in Boston, Massachusetts) is an American art historian, archeologist, and educator. A scholar of Ancient Rome, Pollini is the USC Associates Professor of Art History at the University of Southern California.

== Career ==
Born in Boston to Isabell and Frederick, Pollini graduated magna cum laude from the University of Washington with a Bachelor of Arts in Classics in 1968. He then continued on to the University of California, Berkeley, where he received a Master of Arts and a Doctor of Philosophy in Ancient History and Mediterranean Archaeology, in 1973 and 1978 respectively.

In 1979, Pollini began his teaching career as a Visiting Assistant Professor of Classics at Johns Hopkins University. A year later, he was hired to a dual role there as Assistant Professor of Classics and Curator of the Archeological Museum. In 1987, Pollini moved to the University of Southern California as Associate Professor of Classics and Art History. Four years later, he was made Professor of Art History, and in 2018, the professorship was endowed as the USC Associates Professor of Art History. Pollini has also held administrative posts there, namely that of Chair of the Department of Art History from 1990 to 1993, and Dean of the School of Fine Arts from 1993 to 1996.

A scholar of ancient history and classical archeology, Pollini has worked extensively on such subjects as the Ara Pacis, the Augustus of Prima Porta, the Farnese Cup, and the Skyphos. In 2006, he was awarded a Guggenheim Fellowship to further work on similar topics.

== See also ==
- List of Guggenheim Fellowships awarded in 2006
- List of Johns Hopkins University people
- List of people from Boston
- List of University of California, Berkeley alumni in arts and media
- List of University of Southern California people
- List of University of Washington alumni
