= Gerald M. Ackerman =

American art historian

- Born: Gerald Martin Ackerman; August 21, 1928; Alameda, California, United States
- Died: January 1, 2016 (aged 87); Claremont, California, United States
- Occupations: Art historian Educator
- Spouse: Leonard R. Simon

Academic background
- Education: University of California, Berkeley; Princeton University
- Thesis: The Structure of Lomazzo's Treatise on Painting (1964)
- Doctoral advisor: Rensselaer W. Lee
- Other advisor: Erwin Panofsky

Academic work
- Discipline: Art history
- Sub-discipline: Nineteenth-century French art
- Institutions: Bryn Mawr College; Stanford University; Pomona College

Gerald "Jerry" Martin Ackerman OAL (August 21, 1928 – January 1, 2016) was an American art historian and educator. Ackerman was Professor of Art History Emeritus at Pomona College. He was a leading authority on the art of Jean-Léon Gérôme and Charles Bargue.

== Career ==
Born in Alameda, but raised in Santa Cruz, Ackerman was one of four siblings born to Alois and Eva Sadler. While studying at the University of California, Berkeley, Ackerman had a brief relationship with poet Robert Duncan. Ackerman graduated with a Bachelor of Arts in 1952, and then continued on to receive a Doctor of Philosophy from Princeton University in Art History in 1964. His doctoral dissertation was on the painter Gian Paolo Lomazzo, supervised by Rensselaer W. Lee.

In 1959, while studying at Princeton, Ackerman began his teaching career at Bryn Mawr College as a lecturer. Six years later, he was hired at Stanford University as assistant professor of art history. In 1971, Ackerman was hired at Pomona College at the level of associate professor. Five years later, he became professor and department chair, and spent the rest of his career at Pomona. Ackerman retired from teaching in 1989 and became professor emeritus. In 1994, he had a stint as Appleton Distinguished Professor at Florida State University. In 2012, Ackerman was named Officer of the Ordre des Arts et des Lettres by the French government.

== Personal life ==
In 1962, Ackerman met his long-time partner and husband, Leonard R. Simon, his life partner of 52 years. The couple remained together until Simon's death in 2014. Ackerman died two years later, survived by two siblings and many nieces and nephews.

== See also ==
- List of Bryn Mawr College people
- List of Florida State University people
- List of gay, lesbian or bisexual people: A
- List of members of the Ordre des Arts et des Lettres
- List of people from Santa Cruz, California
- List of Pomona College people
- List of Princeton University people
- List of Stanford University people
- List of University of California, Berkeley alumni in arts and media
