= Sean Go =

Filipino Pop Artist

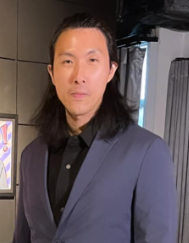
- Sean Go at a public event in 2023.
- Born: 20 July 1993 (age 32); Manila, Philippines
- Education: University of California, Berkeley (BS, BA); Columbia University (MS); Emory University (MBA, JM); Fashion Institute of Technology (MA); Parson's School of Design (MA)
- Occupations: Visual artist, sculptor

Sean Go (born 20 July 1993) is a Filipino pop artist. His work incorporates appropriation and comments on societal themes such as capitalism, perceptions of beauty, and colonialism in the Philippines, often through the use of popular fictional characters.

== Early life and education ==
Go has stated that, coming from a conservative family, he did not initially receive support from his elders to pursue art as a career. However, the death of a close friend from cancer shifted his perspective. Go has spoken about the importance of Asian representation in the arts, as creativity is not often encouraged as a career path in traditional households. Go also hopes to destigmatize anime and cartoon fandom culture.

Go holds degrees from UC Berkeley, Emory, Columbia University, and the Fashion Institute of Technology. He has earned four master's degrees and three bachelor's degrees. He completed his bachelor's degree in 2015 and his law and MBA degrees in 2019. His bachelor's degrees are in Business administration, economics, and geography. He obtained a master's degree in real estate development from Columbia University in 2021 and a Master of Arts in Art Market Studies from the Fashion Institute of Technology in 2022. He also graduated with a Master of Arts in Fashion from Parsons Paris where he wrote about Asian representation in superhero costumes within the Marvel Cinematic Universe.

He studied film at USC and is a graduate of the International School of Manila.

== Career ==
Go started a hedge fund, HGR Digital Asset Group, in 2018. Before becoming an artist, he worked at Ernst and Young, Techstars, and HSBC.

Go's work was included in the inaugural Modern and Contemporary Arts Festival in Manila in 2022, by art agent Derek Flores. His art was also featured in Art Moments Jakarta and Indo Seni's "Wave to the Moon" exhibition in 2022.

In April 2023, Go was included as a featured artist at "Agos," an exhibit on environmental conservation in the Philippines. The works incorporated recycled materials and paints. Go's collaborated with PickUP Coffee for a collection which was released in December 2023, featuring the PickUP Dragon.

In June 2024, Go held a solo show titled "Victory Road" at Secret Fresh Gallery in Manila, which had a Pokémon-based theme. “Victory Road” focused on individual journeys and explored themes of triumph, perseverance, and resilience. In August 2024, Go launched art toys with Toki, an Australian toy company. Go was included in the exhibit titled "Pearls of Color" in London at the D Contemporary Gallery in September 2024, an event which partnered with the Philippine Embassy in the UK.

In 2025, Go hosted shows across several nations, including in Japan, France,, Netherlands and his home country of the Philippines.

== Work ==
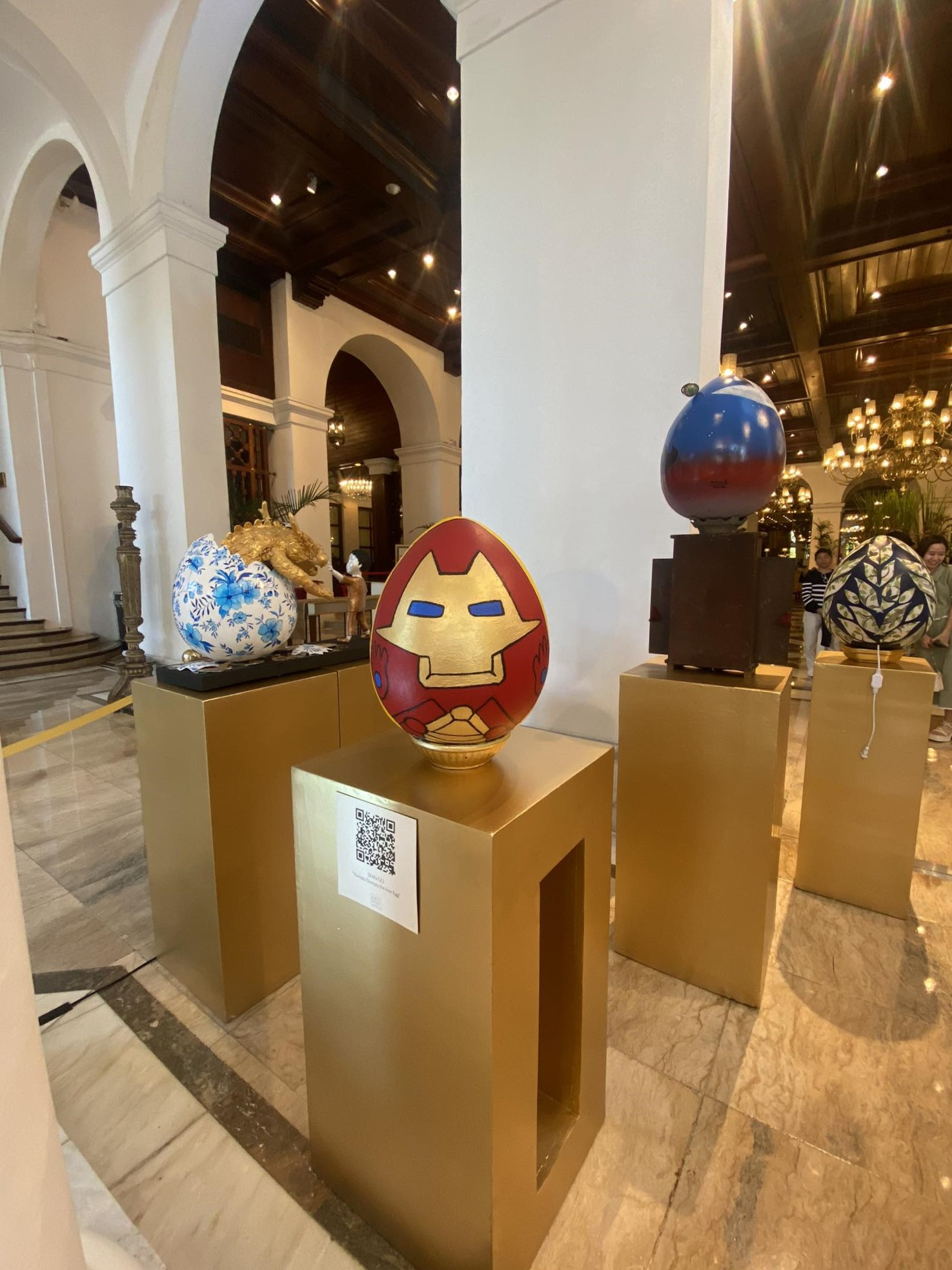
Go's Humpty the Iron Egg at the Manila Hotel in March 2024

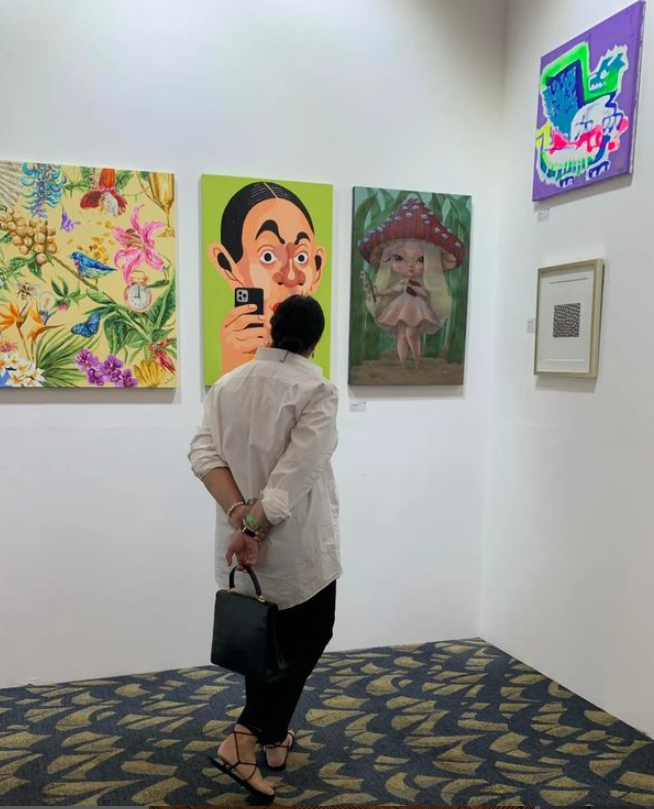
Go's Disco Bolt Dragon the Jakarta Art Moments Art Festival of 2024

Go uses references to toy brands including Barbie, Playmobil, Thomas the Tank Engine, Lego, Transformers, and Little Tikes. Go's works often remix pop culture elements such as brand logos and popular characters. Go often combines characters from different universes; for example, Iron Man and Humpty Dumpty, to create Humpty the Iron Egg. Go also combines Japanese anime characters with Filipino food, including characters from Hello Kitty, Yu-Gi-Oh!, and Naruto.

Drawing from his background in finance, Go often incorporates capitalist critiques in his art. Go has used reference materials from Marvel, Pokémon, and Star Wars, employing a satirical style. Go has cited childhood parables, popular television and movies, and Bible stories as inspiration.

Go's works deal with the themes of the ephemerality of beauty and the interplay between perception and reality. Go's work also explores the fetishization of women’s bodies and the dangers of commercial systems that market sexuality and sensuality.

Go uses spray paint, colors, and crayons to communicate a child-like tone in his paintings.

== Recognition ==
Go's work has been featured in Vogue, GQ, Harper's Bazaar, Elle, L'Officiel, Wonderland, and Esquire.

Go has also collaborated with Manila Hotel and JAG Jeans.

== Personal life ==
Go has a vestibular balance disorder, which caused balance issues growing up. Some commentators suggest that this condition has impacted his art. Go practices martial arts and combat sports. He has trained with UFC and Bellator champion Lyman Good and four-time champion and Olympic boxer Brian Viloria. Go sponsors MMA and boxing fighters, including former WBC Latino Champion Ron "Diablo" Cruz and WBA Intercontinental champion Kareem Hackett.

Go founded the UC Berkeley Club of the Philippines and serves on the executive committee.

== Gallery ==
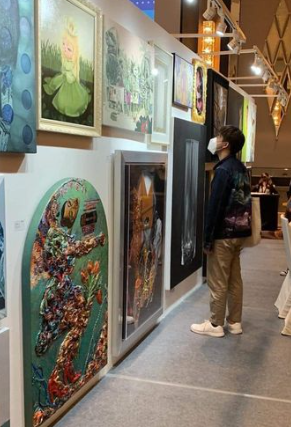
Go's works at MOCAF in 2022

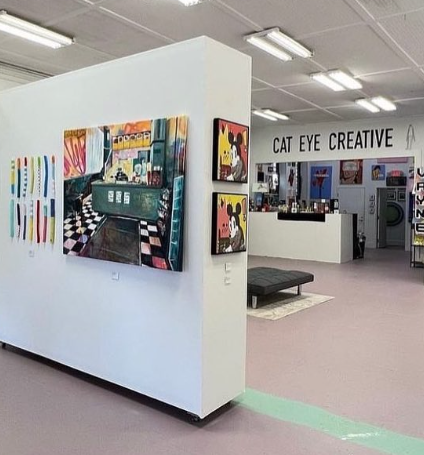
Go's Playmouse variations at Cat-Eye Creative Gallery in Atlanta, Georgia

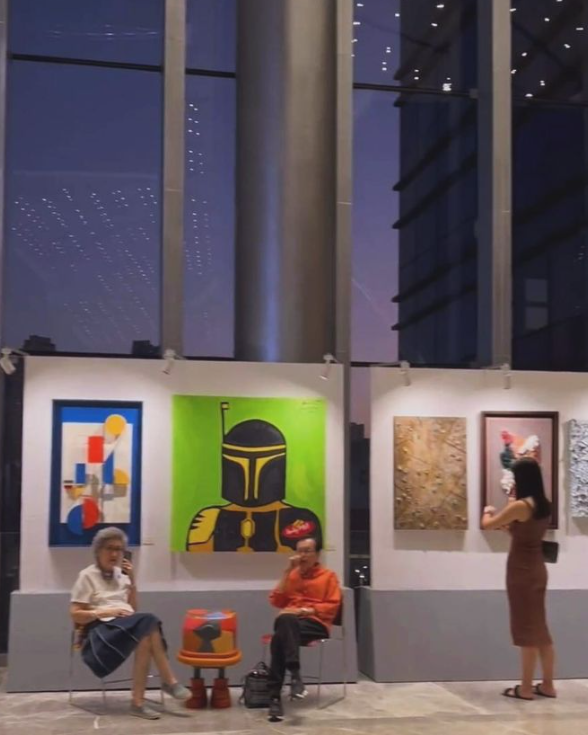
Go's Lucky Mandalorian at the Samsung Performing Arts Theater in Manila, Philippines

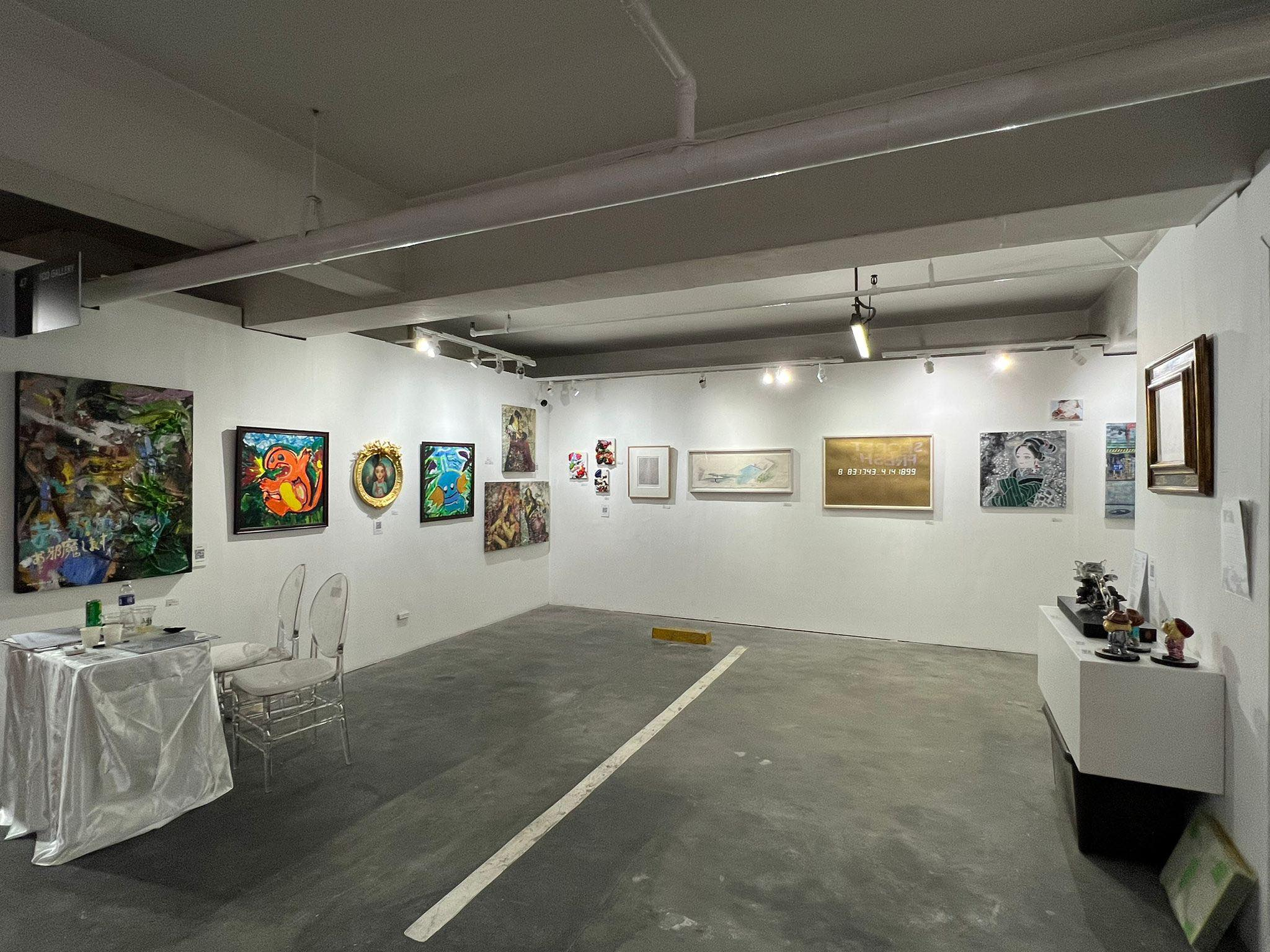
Go's Pokemon at YOD Gallery Tokyo in 2024
