= Aimee La Joie =

American actress

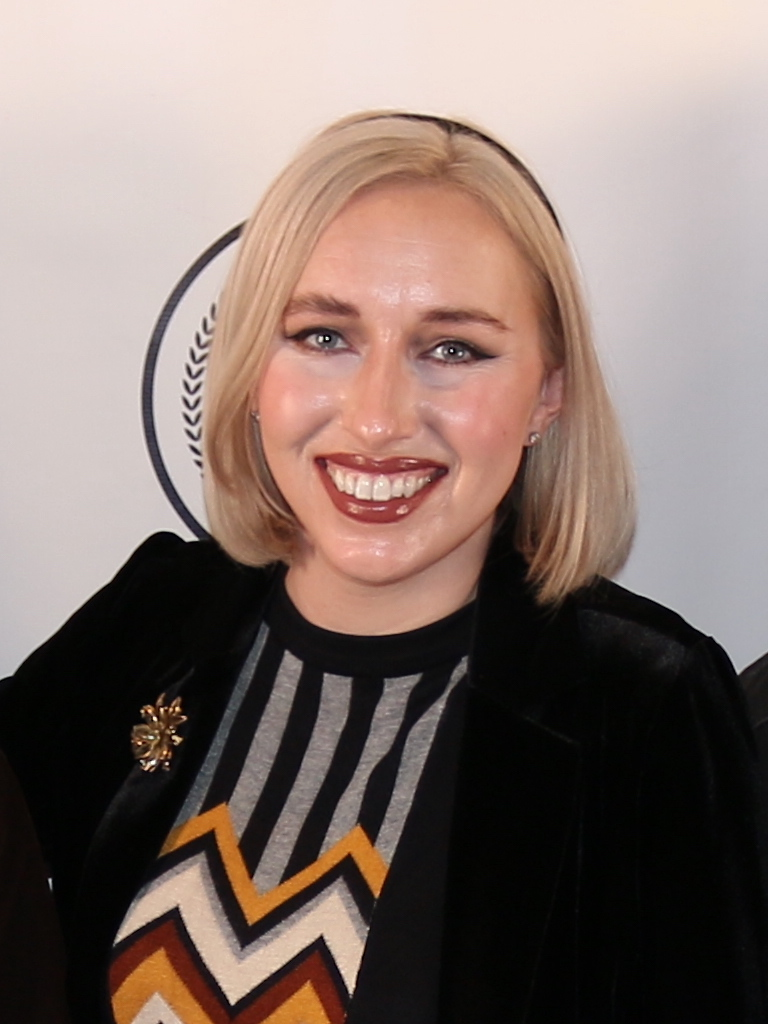
- La Joie in 2024
- Born: 1990 or 1991 (age 35–36); San Diego, California, U.S.
- Education: University of California, Berkeley
- Occupations: Actress; photographer; videographer; model
- Years active: 2012–present
- Known for: The Film Crew
- Notable credits: Freedom, Wisconsin; Hemet, or the Landlady Don't Drink Tea

Instagram information
- Page: Aimee La Joie
- Followers: 38.8K (June 2026)

TikTok information
- Page: Aimee La Joie
- Followers: 122.3k (July 2026)
- Website: aimeelajoie.com

Aimee La Joie (born 1990 or 1991) is an American actress, photographer, videographer and model. She is best known for the viral video The Film Crew and appeared in the films Hemet, or the Landlady Don't Drink Tea (2023), Freedom, Wisconsin (2023), Buy Roses for Me (2019), and Refuge (2017).

La Joie made guest appearances at Location Managers Guild Awards, St. John's International Women's Film Festival and her work screened at the 13th Oceanside International Film Festival. She was nominated for acting at the 2017 GI Film Festival San Diego and was a juror at the 2025 HollyShorts Film Festival.

== Personal life and career ==
La Joie was born in 1990 or 1991 and grew up in Bonsall, California. She began acting while attending Fallbrook High School. In 2012, she received a bachelor's degree in film studies at the University of California Berkeley before returning to San Diego County to settle in Poway.

La Joie is an actress, photographer, videographer and model. She created a YouTube web series called The Bumble Bums and was nominated for Best Actress at the 2017 GI Film Festival San Diego for her performance in the film Refuge. La Joie created online sketch parodies of Home Town, MasterChef, Queer Eye, and Say Yes to the Dress.

=== 2020: The Film Crew ===
In August 2020, La Joie was inspired by the "Mr. Blue Sky" song trend of people in everyday situations on TikTok. She based her version on her own film set experience and The Film Crew shows every crew member on a film set, all played by La Joie. The video went viral, prompting La Joie to make more. Cinemanía wrote that they hope La Joie's videos help her career and bring more attention to women working on and off camera in the film industry. John Plunkett at The Poke said her "one-woman depiction of a film crew is simply brilliant." Her videos were included in Make it Work, a women in film special that aired on The CW, and were listed on Ad Age's "The Top 5 Creative Brand Ideas You Need to Know About Right Now: August 7, 2020." On September 3, 2020, La Joie was featured in a social distance toast for a Women in Film Cincinnati virtual event.

=== 2021–present ===
In 2021, La Joie made a guest appearance at the Location Managers Guild Awards and was featured in Scene and Heard at St. John's International Women's Film Festival. She talked about her desire to join Saturday Night Live and expressed that she began creating her own content because she didn't get results from working on the projects of others.

La Joie co-starred with Stephen George in the dark comedy film Freedom, Wisconsin by Molly Preston in 2023. She described her role of Kate Myrtle in the satirical horror film Hemet, or the Landlady Don't Drink Tea as someone different from herself that was "out of her comfort zone" and "pushed her to the limits." La Joie was a juror at the 2025 HollyShorts Film Festival alongside Celia Imrie, Penelope Wilton, Catherine Hardwicke, Jake Lacy, and Mena Suvari.

== Filmography ==
Films
Year	Title	Role	Notes
2016	Hail, Caesar!	Brown Derby Patron	
2017	Refuge	Jeanine Fischer	Short film featuring Caroline Amiguet, Beth Gallagher and Karenssa LeGear
2018	Beverly Hills Bandits	Kerri	Featuring Natasha Alam and Ron Jeremy
2019	Buy Roses for Me	Shayna	Short film featuring Jon Allen and Brian Patrick Butler
2021	Golden Hour	Script-Girl (voice)	Animated short film by Gobelins School of the Image
2023	Freedom, Wisconsin	Penny	
2023	Hemet, or the Landlady Don't Drink Tea	Kate Myrtle	
2023	Ladies of the '80s: A Divas Christmas	Worker	

Television, web series, and videos
Year	Title	Role	Notes
2016	Pitch	Fan	Episode: "Pilot", uncredited
2019	The Bumble Bums	Aimee	Web series, also creator, director, producer and editor
2020	The Film Crew	Every character on a film set	Web video, also creator
2023	Accident, Suicide or Murder	Rachel Winkler	Episode: "Cutting Ties"

== Accolades ==
Festival	Year	Award	Title	Result	Ref.
GI Film Festival San Diego	2017	Best Actress	Refuge	Nominated	
San Diego Film Awards	2024	Best Ensemble Cast	Hemet, or the Landlady Don't Drink Tea	Nominated	
