= Nancy J. Troy =

American art historian

Nancy J. Troy (born 27 December 1952) is Victoria and Roger Sant Professor in Art at Stanford University. She was previously professor of modern art and chair of art history at the University of Southern California until 2010. Troy is a specialist in modern European art and has written books on the De Stijl movement, modernism and the decorative arts in France, and the works of Piet Mondrian.

== Early life ==
Nancy J. Troy was born on 27 December 1952. She received her BA from Wesleyan University in 1974, her MA from Yale University in 1976, and her PhD from Yale University in 1979.

== Career ==
Troy taught at Johns Hopkins University (1979–83), Northwestern University (1983-93), and the University of Southern California (1994-2010). She is currently the Victoria and Roger Sant Professor in Art at Stanford University. Troy is a specialist in modern European art and has written books on the De Stijl movement (1983), modernism and the decorative arts in France (1991) and the afterlife of the works of Piet Mondrian (2013) in which she explored how the artist's work had been exploited by commercial interests after his death to become a brand.

She is a past president of the National Committee for the History of Art and was editor-in-chief of the art history journal, The Art Bulletin, from 1994 to 1997.

== Selected publications ==
- The De Stijl Environment. MIT Press, 1983.
- Modernism and the Decorative Arts in France: Art Nouveau to Le Corbusier. Yale University Press, New Haven, 1991.
- Architecture and Cubism. MIT Press, 1998. (Edited with Eve Blau)
- Couture Culture: A Study in Modern Art and Fashion. MIT Press, 2003.
- The Afterlife of Piet Mondrian. University of Chicago Press, 2013.
