= Taro Masushio =

Japanese artist and writer

Taro Masushio is a Japanese artist and writer living in New York, NY. Masushio attended the University of California, Berkeley where he earned a BA and New York University where he earned an MFA.

Masushio has exhibited internationally and participated in an artist residency at Denniston Hill in Glen Wild, NY. He has written for ArtAsiaPacific, Artforum, and Shift

== Exhibitions ==
- Berkeley Art Museum and Pacific Film Archive, Berkeley, CA
- University of California, Santa Barbara
- 321 Gallery, New York, NY
- 80WSE Gallery, New York, NY
- Miyako Yoshinaga, New York, NY
- Washington State University Dengerink Administration Building Gallery, Vancouver, WA
- S1, Portland, OR
- Practice Space, New York, NY
- Work Sound International, Portland, OR
- Capsule Shanghai, Shanghai, China
