= S. Hollis Clayson =

Art historian

S. Hollis Clayson is an art historian and Bergen Evans Professor in the Humanities at Northwestern University. Her work focuses on 19th-century Europe, particularly France, as well as exchanges between France and the United States. Clayson was the founding director of Northwestern's Alice Kaplan Institute for the Humanities, serving from 2006 to 2013.

Clayson studied art history at Wellesley College, and earned a doctorate in the field at the University of California at Los Angeles. Her dissertation was supervised by T.J. Clark.

She was Robert Sterling Clark Visiting Professor in the Williams College Graduate Program in the History of Art in the fall of 2005. In early 2014, she was named a Chevalier in the Ordre des Palmes Académiques by the French Ministry of Culture. In fall of 2015, she was Kirk Varnedoe Visiting Professor at the Institute of Fine Arts, New York University. She was the 2013–2014 Samuel H. Kress Professor at the National Gallery of Art's Center for Advanced Study in the Visual Arts. She returned to CASVA in November–December 2017 as the Paul Mellon Visiting Senior Fellow, and was named Chercheuse invitée by the Institut national d’histoire de l’art in Paris, for April–May 2018.

== Works ==
- "Representations of prostitution in early Third Republic France." (Ph.D. dissertation, UCLA, 1984)
- Painted Love: Prostitution in French Art of the Impressionist Era (Yale University Press, 1991)
- (Edited, with Alexander Sturgis), Understanding Paintings: Themes in Art, Explored and Explained. (Watson-Guptill, 2000)
- Paris in Despair: Art and Everyday Life Under Siege (1870–71) (University of Chicago Press, 2002)
- (Edited, with André Dombrowski), Is Paris Still the Capital of the Nineteenth Century? Essays on Art and Modernity, 1850-1900 (Routledge, 2016)
- Illuminated Paris: Essays on Art and Lighting in the Belle Époque (University of Chicago Press, 2019)
