= Walter J. Boyne =

US Air Force officer (1929–2020)

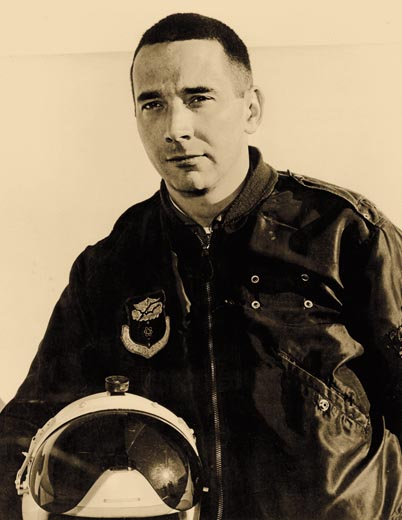
- Pilot Walter Boyne in the 1950s
- Born: February 2, 1929; East St. Louis, Illinois, U.S.
- Died: January 9, 2020 (aged 90); Calverton, Maryland, U.S.
- Military career
- Allegiance: United States of America
- Branch: United States Air Force
- Service years: 1951–1974 (23 years)
- Rank: Colonel
- Commands: 635th Services Squadron
- Other work: Museum Director; Author

Walter J. Boyne (February 2, 1929 – January 9, 2020) was a United States Air Force officer, Command Pilot, combat veteran, aviation historian, and author of more than 50 books and over 1,000 magazine articles. He was a director of the National Air and Space Museum of the Smithsonian Institution and a Chairman of the National Aeronautic Association.

== Early life ==
Walter Boyne was born in East Saint Louis, Illinois, and grew up the son of a poor family during the time of the Great Depression. He attended Holy Angels grade school where he first discovered an interest in writing. His love of flying was encouraged by dime novels of the day such as Robert J. Hogan's G-8 and His Battle Aces that depicted "America's World War I Flying Spy" engaged in air-to-air combat. He decided at this young age that he would become a pilot for the Air Force and focused his efforts to achieve that goal. Boyne earned a number of scholarships that enabled him to attend Washington University in St. Louis.

== Military career ==
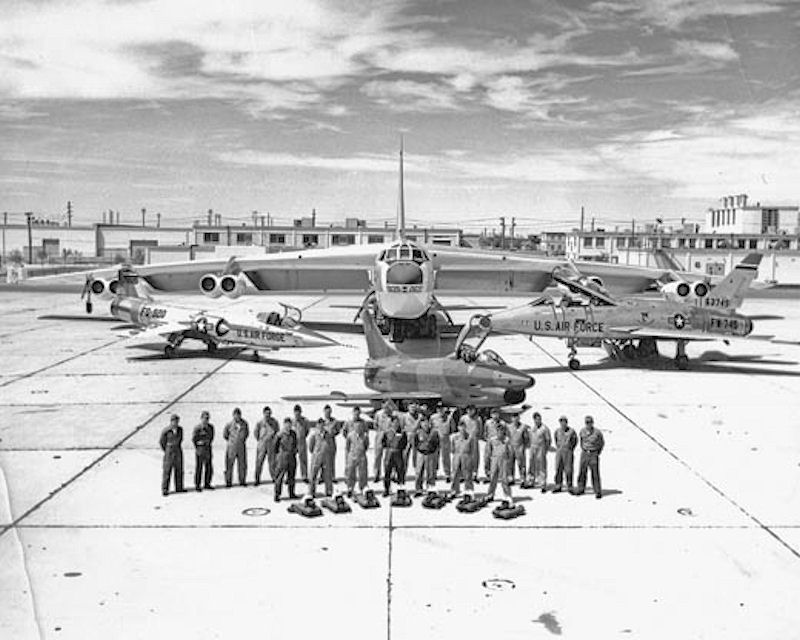
4925th Test Group. Boyne is in the back row, fourth from the left

In May 1951, after two years at the university, Boyne entered the U.S. Air Force's Aviation Cadet program, where he learned a profound respect for the enlisted grades of the military. Boyne started flight school in November 1951 and became the first of his class to solo. On December 19, 1952, he was awarded his wings as an Air Force Pilot and a commission as a second lieutenant in the United States Air Force.

While stationed at Castle Air Force Base in central California, Boyne flew the B-50 Superfortress as a member of the 330th Bomb Squadron of the 93rd Bomb Wing. Although Boyne had relatively few hours in bombers, he received orders in May 1954 to McConnell Air Force Base in Wichita, Kansas, for training in the B-47 Stratojet, which he flew for several years. In 1957, he returned to college and graduated with honors from the University of California, Berkeley with a bachelor's degree in business administration. Boyne continued his education and later earned a master's degree in business administration from the University of Pittsburgh.

Boyne returned to active flying as a nuclear test pilot with the 4925th Nuclear Test Group at Kirtland Air Force Base near Albuquerque, New Mexico. While at Kirtland, he became an aircraft commander in both the B-47 and B-52 Stratofortress. Boyne served during the Vietnam War as commander of the 635th Services Squadron at U-Tapao Royal Thai Air Base where he flew 120 combat hours as a C-47 Skytrain instructor pilot. Colonel Boyne retired from the Air Force on June 1, 1974, with more than 5,000 hours in various military aircraft.

== Author and historian ==
Boyne began his writing career in 1962 while still in the Air Force. He wrote about lesser-known people and airplanes, starting with an article on the Curtiss P-36. Boyne's article was accepted by a magazine in Britain which paid him $29. The P-36 aircraft now resides in the National Museum of the United States Air Force at Wright-Patterson AFB near Dayton, Ohio. Boyne was the author of over fifty books and over one thousand magazine articles.

=== Works ===
Non-fiction

- (1979) The Jet Age: Forty Years of Jet Aviation
- (1980) Messerschmitt Me 262: Arrow to the Future
- (1980) Flying, an introduction to flight, airplanes, and aviation careers
- (1981) Boeing B-52: A Documentary History
- (1982) The Aircraft Treasures of Silver Hill
- (1983) Vertical Flight: The Age of the Helicopter
- (1984) De Havilland DH-4: From Flaming Coffin to Living Legend
- (1985) Phantom in Combat
- (1986) The Leading Edge
- (1987) Classics: U.S. Aircraft of World War II
- (1987) The Smithsonian Illustrated History of Flight
- (1988) The Smithsonian Book of Flight for Young People
- (1988) The Power Behind The Wheel
- (1990) Flight
- (1991) Weapons of Desert Storm (New York Times' Best Seller List)
- (1991) Gulf War
- (1992) Classic Aircraft
- (1992) Art in Flight: The Sculpture of John Safer
- (1993) Silver Wings
- (1994) Clash of Wings: World War II in the Air
- (1995) Clash of Titans: World War II at Sea
- (1995) Fly Past, Fly Present
- (1997) Beyond the Wild Blue, A History of the USAF, 1947–1997
- (1998) Beyond the Horizons:The Story of Lockheed
- (1999) Brassey's Air Combat Reader (editor)
- (2001) Aces in Command: Fighter Pilots as Combat Leaders
- (2001) German Military Aircraft
- (2001) The Best of Wings
- (2001) Aviation 100, Volume I
- (2001) Classic Aircraft, 2001
- (2002) Aviation 100, Volume II
- (2002) The Two O'Clock War
- (2003) Aviation 100, Volume III
- (2003) Encyclopedia of Air Warfare
- (2003) The Influence of Air Power on History
- (2003) Chronicle of Flight: A Year-By-Year History of Aviation
- (2003) Rising Tide
- (2003) Operation Iraqi Freedom, What Went Right, What Went Wrong and Why
- (2003) The Alpha Bravo Delta Guide to the U.S. Air Force
- (2003) The Alpha Bravo Delta Guide to the U.S. Navy
- (2003) The Alpha Bravo Delta Guide to the U.S. Army
- (2003) The Alpha Bravo Delta Guide to the U.S. Marines
- (2003) The Yom Kippur War: And the Airlift Strike That Saved Israel
- (2004) Today's Best Military Writing
- (2007) Soaring to Glory: the Story of the Air Force Memorial
- (2011) How the Helicopter Changed Modern Warfare
- (2018) The 25 Most Influential Aircraft of All Time

Fiction

- (1986) The Wild Blue: The Novel of the U.S. Air Force
- (1989) Trophy for Eagles
- (1991) Eagles at War
- (1992) Air Force Eagles
- (2003) Dawn Over Kitty Hawk: The Novel of the Wright Brothers
- (2006) Roaring Thunder: A Novel of the Jet Age
- (2006) Supersonic Thunder: A Novel of the Jet Age
- (2009) Hypersonic Thunder: A Novel of the Jet Age

== National Air and Space Museum career ==
In 1974, after retiring from the Air Force, Boyne joined the National Air and Space Museum as curator of air transport. Prior to the opening of the museum in 1976, he was assigned responsibility for introducing all aircraft into their exhibits. Boyne was also responsible for transforming the museum's dilapidated Silver Hill facility into the world's premier restoration facility. He also organized the effort to rename the facility in honor of Paul E. Garber, a curator of the National Air Museum—the predecessor to the National Air and Space Museum.

Boyne was named acting director of the museum in 1982, and director on February 10, 1983. Boyne performed a number of notable actions during his tenure as museum director including:

- Founded the best-selling aviation magazine Air & Space
- Orchestrated flights of an IMAX camera on the Space Shuttle
- Supervised the production of the IMAX movies The Dream is Alive and On the Wing
- Worked with the then-FAA Administrator, retired Vice Admiral Donald D. Engen, to provide the land upon which the Steven F. Udvar-Hazy Center was built
- Arranged for the Space Shuttle Enterprise to be flown and stored at the museum in 1985
- Pioneered the museum's video disc program and patented the "Digitizer" automated storage and retrieval system

He resigned as director of the museum in 1986.

== Later years ==
In 1998, Boyne co-founded the cable television channel, Wingspan—the Air and Space Channel, that was purchased by the Discovery Channel a year later. Boyne lived in Ashburn, Virginia. His first wife, the former Jeanne Quigley, died in 2007. They have four children, Molly, Katie, Bill and Peggy, five grandchildren, J.D., Grace, Walter, Charlotte and Charles. Boyne remarried on January 10, 2008, to Terezia Takacs.

Boyne previously served as chairman of the board of the National Aeronautic Association, the oldest aviation organization in the United States, stepping down in 2014.

Boyne died on January 9, 2020, at 90 years of age. He was interred at Arlington National Cemetery in May 2021.

== Honors ==
In 1984, Boyne was awarded an honorary Doctorate in Aerospace Sciences from Salem College, West Virginia. In 1987, the National Aeronautic Association (NAA) awarded him the Cliff Henderson Trophy for lifetime achievement in aviation. In 1998, the NAA named him a Distinguished Statesman of Aviation that honors outstanding living Americans that have made contributions of significant value to aeronautics. Also in 1998, the Fédération Aéronautique Internationale honored Boyne with the Paul Tissandier Diploma awarded to those who have served the cause of Aviation in general and Sporting Aviation in particular. In 2005, the Aircraft Industries Association presented Boyne with the Lauren D. Lyman Award for outstanding achievement in aviation public relations. In 2007, he was enshrined in the National Aviation Hall of Fame. In 2016, the Aero Club of Washington, D.C. awarded Boyne the Donald D. Engen Trophy for Aviation Excellence.
