= Freedom, Wisconsin (film) =

2023 film by Molly Preston

- Poster
- Directed by: Molly Preston
- Written by: Molly Preston
- Produced by: Katie Dalziel; Aileen Sheedy
- Starring: Aimee La Joie; Stephen George; Melissa Shoshahi; Michelle Renee Thompson; Cory Hardin; Jessica Ambuehl; Richard Baiker; John Clark
- Cinematography: Kevin Forrest
- Edited by: Molly Preston
- Production company: Preston Productions
- Release date: September 27, 2023 (Oregon Independent Film Festival)
- Country: United States
- Language: English

Freedom, Wisconsin, also known as Freedom, WI, is a 2023 coming of age dark comedy film written and directed by Molly Preston in her feature film debut. It stars Aimee La Joie and Stephen George. It was nominated for a Femmy Award at the Nevada Women's Film Festival.

== Plot ==
A young woman seeking self-discovery is held up after running into a struggling writer from the big city.

== Cast ==
- Aimee La Joie as Penny
- Stephen George as Ephram
- Melissa Shoshahi as Trisha
- Michelle Renee Thompson as Shelly
- Cory Hardin as Young Priest
- Jessica Ambuehl as Lily
- Richard Baiker as Bruce
- John Clark as Farmer

== Production ==
The film was shot in Kaukauna, Wisconsin and the Fox Cities in August and September of 2021. Preston originally penned the script around 2011 when she lived in Appleton, Wisconsin after graduating from Lawrence University. The film is set in Freedom, Wisconsin and features Kaukauna Mayor Tony Penterman.

== Release ==
The film premiered at the Oregon Independent Film Festival in Eugene, Oregon on September 27, 2023. In 2024, it screened at the 10th Nevada Women's Film Festival, Red Cedar Film Festival in Menomonie, Wisconsin, Cactus Club Independent Film Festival in Milwaukee, Wisconsin, Kansas City Underground Film Festival in Kansas City, Missouri, and Klamath Independent Film Festival in Klamath Falls, Oregon.

== Reception ==
The film was nominated for a Femmy Award in the category of Best Feature Film at the Nevada Women's Film Festival.
