= Steven L. Thompson =

American novelist

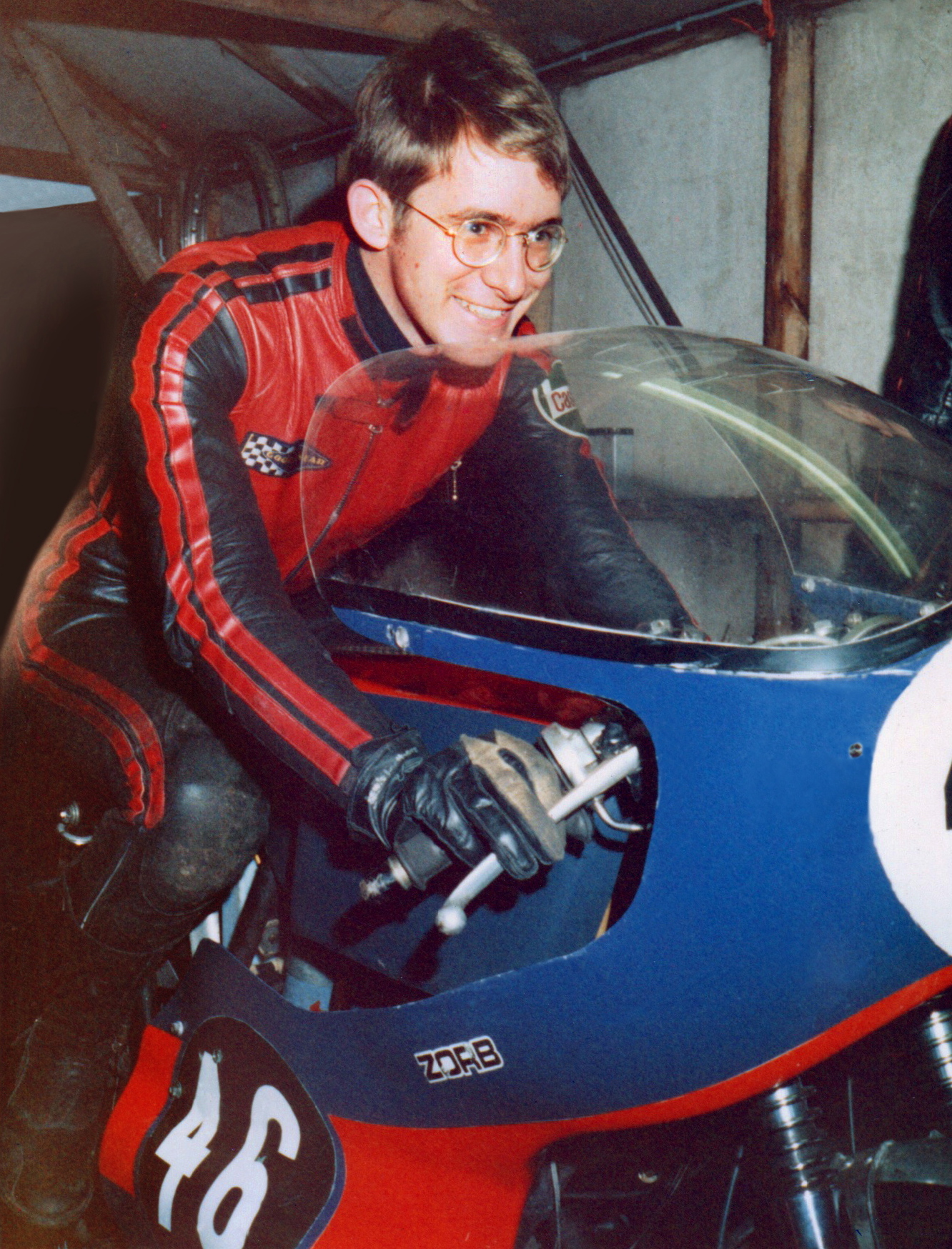
- Thompson in 1971, aboard his racing motorcycle
- Born: Steven Lynn Thompson; May 27, 1948 (age 78); San Antonio, Texas
- Education: UC Berkeley
- Occupations: Author, journalist
- Spouses: Merry L. Barker (May, 1973–May, 1982); Laning Pepper (July 24, 1982–present)
- Writing career
- Language: English
- Genres: Motorcycling; Cold War fiction
- Notable work: The Wild Blue
- Notable awards: Maggie Award, 1986

Steven Lynn Thompson (born 1948) is an author, magazine journalist, historian of technology and former motorcycle racer.

== Early life and education ==
Thompson was born May 27, 1948, at Ft. Sam Houston, San Antonio, Texas, to career US Air Force pilot Major Ray Lynn Thompson (1921–1991) and his wife, Velma Mildred Thompson (1923–1991). He holds a BA in history from the University of California, Berkeley and served in the US Air Force from 1968 to 1972.

== Writing ==
As an author, Thompson wrote five Cold War thrillers during the 1980s (Recovery, Countdown to China, Bismarck Cross, Airburst and Top End), in which he explored such themes as the role of the US Military Liaison Mission in Potsdam, East Germany, in both clandestine intelligence gathering and in resolving east–west tensions, as well as the reunification of East and West Germany, the coming of the Islamic Jihad to the United States via general aviation aircraft used for terror, and the consequences of contracting to private companies the role of coastal surveillance. The 1988 movie Honor Bound, directed by Jeannot Szwarc and starring Tom Skerritt, was based on Recovery, but not released in the United States after audience previews. In 1985, Thompson invited Walter J. Boyne, then Director of the Smithsonian National Air & Space Museum and a columnist for AOPA Pilot at Thompson's request, to join him in co-authoring a social history of the United States Air Force. Boyne had completed a career in the Air Force and Thompson had been born and bred in the service, as well as serving in it during the Viet Nam war. Boyne subsequently agreed to co-author the book but argued that it should be fiction, and it was sold to Crown Publishers in 1985 by Thompson's literary agent, Jacques de Spoelberch, who represented both authors. Published in 1986 in hardback, the resulting novel, The Wild Blue: The Novel of the U.S. Air Force, became a national best-seller. The Aviation/Space Writers Association awarded Boyne and Thompson its 1986 Journalism Award for fiction in aviation books for the novel.

Thompson's 2008 book Bodies in Motion: Evolution and Experience in Motorcycling, published by Aero Design and Manufacturing, was described by author Melissa Holbrook Pierson as "the most important book ever written on the subject" of motorcycling, and is recommended reading in the Idiot's Guide series. In it, Thompson investigates the psychology of motorcycle riding and "what our vehicles of automobility do to, and not just for, their operators," through the lens of evolutionary biology and psychology. For the book, he also commissioned the Stanford University Smart Products Design Lab to test nine motorcycles for their unique vibration signatures in an attempt to quantify the differences described by enthusiasts. Bodies in Motion received reviews in academic journals.

During Thompson's career in magazines, he helped set circulation records at every publication he directed as editor-in-chief, editorial director, or executive editor, and as a consultant, he redesigned both Autoweek in 1986 and Cycle Guide in 1978. He wrote hundreds of editorial columns and features for the magazines he edited, including a monthly column for AutoWeek called "At Large" from 1994 to 2008, and a monthly column also called "At Large" for Cycle World from 1986 to 1991; his 1986 "At Large" column entitled "Talking Tees" was awarded a "Maggie Award for Excellence" by the Western Publications Association. Also, his "At Large" column "Silver Wing for a Silver Eagle", from the April, 1989 Cycle World, was selected for inclusion in The Devil Can Ride: The World's Best Motorcycle Writing, (Lee Klancher, ed.), p. 260. At the publisher's request, Thompson also authorized Urban Moto Magazine to reprint some of his Cycle World "At Large" columns.

As a historian, Thompson wrote essay reviews and reviewed books for the Society for the History of Technology's journal, Technology & Culture, and was named an Advisory Editor for the journal. He also published historical-analysis articles in Air & Space/Smithsonian, for which he was a consulting, and later a contributing editor, as well as in American Heritage of Invention & Technology, and in automotive, aviation and motorcycle special-interest publications.

== Motorcycle racing ==
As a motorcycle racer, Thompson competed in the US, Britain, Australia, and New Zealand. He also competed three times in the Isle of Man; in the 1970 and 1971 Manx Grands Prix, he was unable to start the Junior (350cc) race on his Shepherd-Kawasaki because of machine failures in practice and qualifying. In 1987, racing as the sole rider for Team Cycle World, he entered the Formula One and 750 Production TT races in May–June, and completed both races, lapping in the 750 Production race at 101.2 mph, making him the first American journalist and fourth American professional racer to have lapped the TT course at over "the ton"—100 mph.

Thompson also was a member of Team Cycle World's successful attempts in 1985 to set new World Speed Records on standard US-specification Suzuki GSX-R750s at the Uniroyal tire-proving course in Laredo, Texas. Two motorcycles were used, and Thompson rode both in the shorter-duration classification and the 24-hour event, in the process being awarded, with the rest of the team, 6, 12, and 24-hour FIM World Speed Records.

== Professional timeline ==
- August 1972–March 1973: Freelance commercial artist
- March 1973–Oct. 1974: Art Director and Senior Editor, Competition Press & Autoweek magazine, Reno, Nevada
- Oct. 1974–Dec. 1976: Editor-in-Chief, Road Test magazine, Compton, CA
- Jan 1977–May 1978; Executive Editor, Car and Driver magazine, New York City, NY
- July 1978–Jan. 1980; editorial director, Cycle Guide magazine
- Jan 1980–Dec. 1981; Director of Editorial Development, Cycle Guide Publications
- April 1982–Oct 1984, Executive Editor, AOPA Pilot magazine
- 1982–1985, Editor-at-Large, Cycle Guide magazine
- Jan 1983–Oct 1984, Vice President, Publications Division, Aircraft Owners and Pilots Association
- 1985–1992, Editor-at-Large, Cycle World magazine
- 1993–2007, Senior Contributing Editor, AutoWeek magazine
- 2005-2025, Outside Editor, Range magazine
- December 2011–December 2017, Contributing Editor, Cycle World

== Books ==
- Recovery, fiction, Warner Books, hardcover 1980, ISBN 0446512079; softcover, 1981; with foreign editions in Italy, Holland, and Japan
- Countdown to China, fiction, Warner Books, softcover, 1982, ISBN 0450055477; foreign editions
- Bismarck Cross, fiction, Tor Books, softcover, 1983, ISBN 0812509447; foreign editions
- The Wild Blue, fiction, (with Walter J. Boyne), Crown Publishers, hardcover 1985, ISBN 0517562855; softcover 1987; foreign editors
- Airburst, fiction, Worldwide, softcover, 1987, ISBN 0373970560; foreign editions
- Top End, fiction, Worldwide, softcover, 1989, ISBN 0373970919; foreign editions
- Bodies in Motion: Evolution and Experience in Motorcycling, non-fiction, Aero Design, 2008, softcover, ISBN 0981900119
- Steven L. Thompson (contributor) (2010). The Devil Can Ride: The World's Best Motorcycle Writing. Motorbooks. ISBN 978-0760334775.
