= The Film Crew (video) =

2020 viral video

- Some of La Joie's depictions in The Film Crew
- Produced by: Aimee La Joie
- Release date: June 19, 2020 (TikTok)
- Running time: 20 seconds
- Country: United States
- Language: English

The Film Crew is a viral video created by Aimee La Joie in 2020. Her depiction of film crew members began from a TikTok trend before going viral on Twitter.

== Background ==
In the summer of 2020, the song "Mr. Blue Sky" became a trend for people in everyday situations on TikTok. Aimee La Joie contributed to the trend, basing her version on the professions of people on a film set. Some of the characters include the actress, the director, the sound guy, the screenwriter, the first camera assistant, the costume designer, the producer, the production assistant, the stuntwoman, the child star, her mother, and the set teacher. In August 2020, the video went viral, reaching over 100,000 shares and 7 million views on Twitter, which prompted La Joie to make more videos of other film set personnel.

== Response ==
John Plunkett at The Poke praised the video and said it initially went viral after Twitter user @leesteffen had shared it. Cinemanía said that they hope it draws attention to films in which women are mainly behind the camera. After La Joie released several similar videos by 2021, Scroll.in pointed out that La Joie had included Tom Cruise, referring to Cruise's altercation with crew members of Mission: Impossible – Dead Reckoning Part One in December 2020. Variety said the video aired on The CW and shared a link to the original which was published on La Joie's TikTok account on June 19, 2020.
