= Connie Wang (writer) =

Chinese American journalist and writer

Connie Wang is a Chinese American journalist and writer. She was the former executive director of Refinery29 and has been awarded several Front Page Awards for digital video and fashion. Her multimedia essay published in The New York Times won the Online Commentary, Personal Narrative Online Journalism Award in 2023.

== Early life and education ==
Wang was born in Jinnan, Tianjin, China, but was raised in Minnesota. She attended the University of California, Berkeley for college.

== Work and publications ==
Wang interned with Glam Media (now known as "Mode Media") after graduating. She would later go onto work for Refinery29, where she wrote numerous articles and hosted and co-produced "Style Out There," a Refinery29 documentary series. In 2018, Wong was awarded two Front Page Awards for her work, one in digital video category for her Style Out There and one in the fashion category. In 2019, she was awarded another Front Page Award in fashion. While at Refinery29, she became the executive director.

In 2021, she left Refinery29 and started working at Netflix.

In 2023, she wrote a multimedia essay titled "I Got My Name From Connie Chung. So Did They" for The New York Times, which was about how Connie Chung inspired a generation to name their daughters after her. That multimedia essay would go on to win a 2023 Online Journalism Award in the Online Commentary, Personal Narrative category. Also in 2023, she published her first book Oh My Mother!, a collection of short stories about her relationship with her mother.
