= The Wild Blue (novel) =

1986 historical fiction novel

- Author: Walter J. Boyne & Steven L. Thompson
- Cover artist: Mangal
- Language: English
- Subject: Historical
- Genre: Fiction
- Publisher: Crown Publishers; Ballantine Books
- Publication date: October 1986
- Publication place: United States
- Media type: Print (Hardback & Paperback)
- Pages: 628 (hardback edition)
- ISBN: 978-0-7434-5062-1

The Wild Blue: The Novel of the U.S. Air Force is a 1986 historical fiction novel written by historians Walter J. Boyne and Steven L. Thompson. It was published by Crown Publishers and Ballantine Books. It was Boyne's first written novel, after nine previous works of non-fiction.

The novel explores the fictionalized careers and life experiences of characters within the United States Air Force, depicting their journey from initial encounters at Basic Training to their departure from the Air Force.

Boyne released a non-fiction book titled Beyond the Wild Blue, about the history of the air force between 1947 and 1997, in 1997.
