= Rod Beaton (news executive) =

American news agency executive and journalist (1923–2002)

- Born: April 16, 1923; Escalon, California, US
- Died: July 5, 2002 (aged 79); Sonoma, California, US
- Education: University of California, Berkeley
- Occupation: Journalist
- Known for: United Press International president and CEO
- Awards: Order of Merit of the Federal Republic of Germany

Roderick W. Beaton (April 16, 1923 – July 5, 2002) was an American news agency executive and journalist. He began writing for United Press International in 1948, then served as its president and chief executive officer from 1972 to 1982. He oversaw the changeover from delivering the news via teleprinter to a datanews receiver, relocating the company's communications center from New York to Dallas, and the upgrade of its receivers for news, photos and audio. He was a graduate of University of California, Berkeley, and received the Commander's Cross of the Order of Merit of the Federal Republic of Germany for his work in press relations.

== Early life ==
Roderick W. Beaton was born on April 16, 1923, in Escalon, California. His father Philip C. Beaton, was the executive editor of the Stockton Record. Beaton served in the United States Navy as a correspondent for the Pacific Ocean theater of World War II. He later graduated from the University of California, Berkeley with a degree in journalism.

== Journalism career ==
Beaton was hired by United Press International (UPI) in San Francisco as a reporter and editor in 1948. He once stated that he was on route to an interview with Associated Press, when an acquaintance convinced him to apply at UPI instead. Beaton was soon promoted to manager of the Fresno, California bureau, and then became the regional business representative for Los Angeles. He later worked as the division manager for the Southeastern United States, and then in the Midwest, and then to New York City in 1962 as the company's vice president and general business manager. In 1965, he began overseeing UPI operations in Europe, Africa and the Middle East, via the UPI bureau in London. He resumed to his role as vice president and general manager in New York in 1969.

Beaton was promoted to president and chief executive officer of UPI on April 28, 1972. He oversaw the changeover from delivering the news via a 60-word-per-minute teleprinter to a 1,200-word-per-minute datanews receiver. He also had the UPI communications center relocated from New York to Dallas, Texas, and upgraded its receivers for news, photos and audio. He retired from UPI on September 1, 1982.

== Honors and awards ==
Beaton received the Commander's Cross of the Order of Merit of the Federal Republic of Germany for his work in press relations, and the Carr Van Anda Award from Ohio University for contributions to journalism.

== Personal life ==
Beaton was married to Evelyn Miller from 1945 until her death in 2001. They had one son and one daughter. Beaton died from heart failure in Sonoma, California, on July 5, 2002.
