= Mark Atkinson (actor) =

American actor and filmmaker

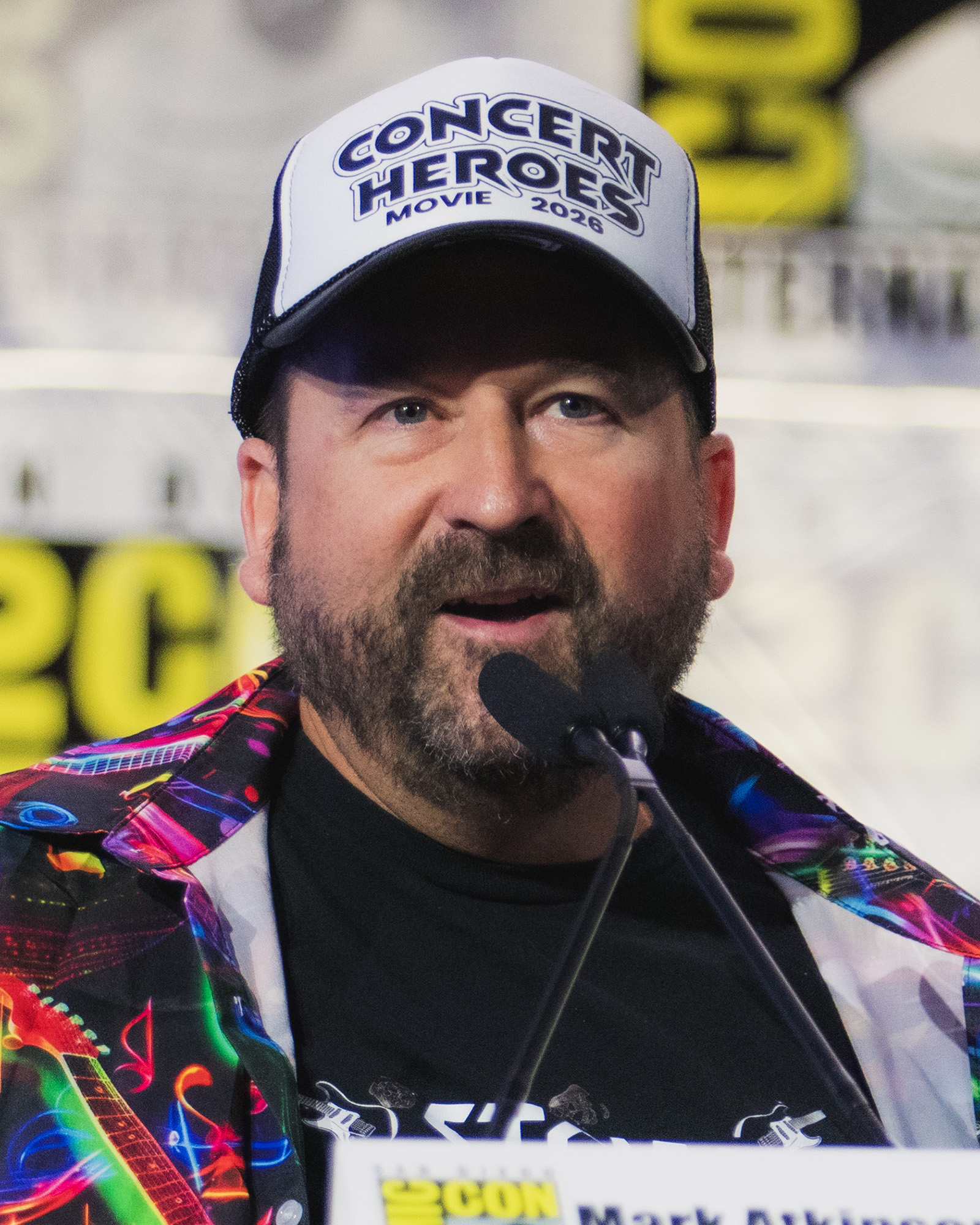
- Atkinson in 2026
- Born: 1980 or 1981 (age 45–46); Rhode Island, U.S.
- Education: South Kingstown High School; University of Rhode Island
- Occupations: Actor; filmmaker; comedian
- Years active: 2003–present
- Known for: Pulp Friction; Leave 'Em Laughing; The Power Agent
- Notable credits: Hemet, or the Landlady Don't Drink Tea; Kung Fu Ghost; Skin: The Movie
- Awards: 2020 Best Supporting Actor World Music & Independent Film Festival

Mark Atkinson is an American actor, filmmaker and comedian who appeared in the films Skin: The Movie (2020) and Hemet, or the Landlady Don't Drink Tea (2023), and produced the short films Pulp Friction (2021) and Leave 'Em Laughing (2020). Atkinson won Best Supporting Actor at World Music & Independent Film Festival and received acting nominations at Austin Revolution Film Festival and Oceanside International Film Festival.

== Personal life ==
After graduating from South Kingstown High School in 1997, Atkinson received a bachelor's degree to conclude four years at University of Rhode Island. He moved to San Diego and briefly studied comedy in Los Angeles at The Groundlings and The Second City. Atkinson later settled in Ocean Beach, San Diego.

== Career ==
Atkinson worked as a lifeguard in South Kingstown and had a job at Marriott for a short period. He moved to California after doing comedy in Boston and Rhode Island at locations such as AS220 and The Station.

In 2007, Atkinson did commercial work that aired on ESPN. Years later he started his own production company and produced the films 92115, Leave 'Em Laughing, and The Power Agent.

In 2020, he was cast as a Denny's manager in Selena: The Series. In 2021, Atkinson starred alongside Randy Davison in Pulp Friction, a film he also wrote and produced. In 2022, he played Marv in Kung Fu Ghost and voiced an animated character in a film called 3 Little Kungpoo Goats, featuring Caroline Amiguet and Brian Patrick Butler. In 2023, Atkinson appeared in the film Hemet, or the Landlady Don't Drink Tea.

=== Panelist moderator ===
In 2025, Atkinson moderated a panel at San Diego Comic-Con to celebrate the 50th anniversary of the release for the film Jaws. Panelists included film critic Chris Gore, author Pat Jankiewicz, Fangoria columnist Steph Cannon, and world record Jaws memorabilia collector Chris Kiszka. Atkinson hosted the same panel at WonderCon in 2026, as well as Aliens' 40th anniversary with panelists Jenette Goldstein and Mark Rolston.

The Aliens' panel continued that year at San Diego Comic-Con with Atkinson, Goldstein, Rolston and Ricco Ross. Atkinson also hosted the Concert Heroes panel at the Indigo Ballroom with Chris Kattan, Joe Nunez, and other cast members.

== Filmography ==
Feature film
Year	Title	Role	Notes
2006	What's The Vig?	Phil	
2019	Dark Harbor	The Restaurant Manager	
2020	Skin: The Movie	Beaver	
2021	Continuance	Homeless Man	
2021	Mega64 Version 4.1: Revengurrection	Steve Vacation	
2022	Kung Fu Ghost	Marv	
2022	3 Little Kungpoo Goats	Hyena (voice)	
2022	Last Chance	Tom	
2023	Hemet, or the Landlady Don't Drink Tea	Keith	
2024	Sincerely Saul	Stew the Suit	
2024	You, Me and Christmas Makes Three	Boris	
TBA	Concert Heroes †	Zeke	
TBA	A Corpse in Kensington †	Bar Patron	
TBA	Fruitful Mold †	Benway	
TBA	Way of the Warrior Kid †	Bridge Driver	

Key
†	Denotes films that have not yet been released

Short film
Year	Title	Role	Actor	Director	Screenwriter	Producer	Notes
2016	A Quint-mas Carol	Uncle Quint	Yes	No	Yes	Yes	Directed by Justin Burquist
2017	The Patio: A Bad Parody to a Bad Movie	Mark / Tommy	Yes	Yes	Yes	Yes	
2017	Forgotten Hero	Lieutenant "Pinky" McKellar	Yes	No	No	No	Featuring Larry Poole
2018	When Howie Met Ronnie	Ronnie Mund	Yes	Yes	Yes	Yes	
2018	92115	Craig Kilpatrick	Yes	No	No	Yes	
2019	Lucky	Brad	Yes	No	No	No	
2019	Old Aquatics	Drew Hunsler	Yes	No	No	No	
2020	Leave 'Em Laughing	Awkward Stagehand	Yes	No	No	Yes	
2020	The Power Agent	Mark	Yes	Yes	Yes	Yes	
2021	Pulp Friction	Marty	Yes	Yes	Yes	Yes	
2021	Sunken Holiday	—N/a	Yes	No	No	No	
TBA	The Plan	Owen	Yes	No	No	No	

== Accolades ==
List of awards and nominations
Event	Year	Award	Film	Result	Ref.
Oceanside International Film Festival	2019	Best Supporting Actor	Lucky	Nominated	
World Music & Independent Film Festival	2020	Best Supporting Actor in a Feature Film	Skin: The Movie	Won	
Austin Revolution Film Festival	2022	Actor of the Year	Pulp Friction	Nominated	
Idyllwild International Festival of Cinema	2022	Indie Spirit Award	Pulp Friction	Won	
Idyllwild International Festival of Cinema	2022	Best Short Film	Pulp Friction	Nominated	
Idyllwild International Festival of Cinema	2021	Best Ensemble Cast Short Film	GPS	Nominated	
Idyllwild International Festival of Cinema	2021	Best Short Film	The Power Agent	Nominated	
Idyllwild International Festival of Cinema	2021	Best Director – Short	The Power Agent	Nominated	
Idyllwild International Festival of Cinema	2021	Best Screenplay – Short	The Power Agent	Nominated	
Idyllwild International Festival of Cinema	2020	Best Ensemble Cast Featurette	Skin: The Movie	Nominated	
Idyllwild International Festival of Cinema	2020	Best Ensemble Cast – Short Film	92115	Nominated	

== Kahuna Productions ==
Kahuna Productions
- Genre: Comedy; Parody
- Headquarters: San Diego, California, U.S.

Atkinson formed his own film production company Kahuna Productions based on a his love for wearing Hawaiian shirts while growing up, something he said he picked up from Ace Ventura. The company was behind the films A Quintmas Carol, The Patio: A Bad Parody to a Bad Movie, When Howie Met Ronnie, 92115, The Power Agent, and Pulp Friction.

In A Quintmas Carol, Atkinson portrayed Captain Quint as an uncle in a short film about 'Twas the Night Before Christmas. It was directed by Justin Burquist. The Patio: A Bad Parody to a Bad Movie is a short parody of The Room and The Disaster Artist. When Howie Met Ronnie is a Howard Stern fan film that was edited by Tony Olmos and distributed by Film Threat. 92115 is a short film about a postal carrier in San Diego that was written and adapted by Jordan Jacobo. Film Threat scored it 7 out of 10.
