= Pulp Friction (film) =

2021 film by Mark Atkinson and Tony Olmos

- Poster
- Directed by: Mark Atkinson; Tony Olmos
- Screenplay by: Mark Atkinson
- Story by: Quentin Tarantino (characters)
- Based on: Pulp Fiction
- Produced by: Mark Atkinson
- Starring: Mark Atkinson; Randy Davison; Elliott Branch Jr.; Savannah Hayworth
- Cinematography: Justin Burquist; Tony Olmos
- Edited by: Tony Olmos
- Music by: Paul Cincotta; Anton Elms
- Production companies: Kahuna Productions; Rosewood Five
- Release date: October 16, 2021 (Show Low Film Festival)
- Running time: 14 minutes
- Country: United States
- Language: English

Pulp Friction is a 2021 parody short film directed by Mark Atkinson and Tony Olmos and written by Atkinson. The film spoofs Pulp Fiction and stars Atkinson, Randy Davison and Elliott Branch Jr. The film won the Indie Spirit Award at Idyllwild International Festival of Cinema; received nominations at Austin Revolution Film Festival, Oceanside International Film Festival, and Award This!; and screened at San Diego Latino Film Festival.

== Plot ==
Jules applies to be Marty and Gary's roommate.

== Cast ==
- Mark Atkinson as Marty
- Randy Davison as Gary
- Elliott Branch Jr. as Jules
- Savannah Hayworth as Mia
- Arabia Essence as Bonnie
- Justin Burquist as Albino Corpse

== Production ==
The story is based on Pulp Fiction by Quentin Tarantino. Elliott Branch Jr. plays Jules, a character originally portrayed by Samuel L. Jackson.

== Release ==
The film screened at Oceanside International Film Festival, San Diego Latino Film Festival, Albuquerque Film & Music Festival and Marina Del Rey Film Festival.

== Reception ==
=== Critical response ===
Sumner Forbes at Film Threat scored it 8.5 out of 10 and said "The five people in the world that haven’t seen Tarantino’s film will be lost, but that’s a sacrifice worth making for a film centered around the world of the most influential film of the 1990s." Audiences at Fan Fiction Film Festival recommended the film.

=== Accolades ===
Festival	Year	Award	Recipient(s)	Result	Ref.
Show Low Film Festival	2021	Best Short 10-15 USA	Pulp Friction	Won	
Imperial County Film Commission Comedy Film Festival	2021	Best Film	Tony Olmos, Mark Atkinson	Runner-up	
Idyllwild International Festival of Cinema	2022	Indie Spirit Award	Pulp Friction	Won	
Idyllwild International Festival of Cinema	2022	Best Short Film	Pulp Friction	Nominated	
Idyllwild International Festival of Cinema	2022	Best Director - Short Film	Tony Olmos	Nominated	
Idyllwild International Festival of Cinema	2022	Best Actor - Short Film	Elliott Branch Jr.	Nominated	
Idyllwild International Festival of Cinema	2022	Best Cinematography - Short Film	Justin Burquist	Nominated	
Oceanside International Film Festival	2022	Best Supporting Actor	Elliott Branch Jr.	Nominated	
Austin Comedy Film Festival	2022	Best Mockumentary	Tony Olmos, Mark Atkinson	Finalist	
Austin Revolution Film Festival	2022	US Comedy Short	Pulp Friction	Nominated	
Austin Revolution Film Festival	2022	Actor of the Year	Mark Atkinson	Nominated	
Block Island Film Festival	2022	Best Comedy Short Film	Mark Atkinson	Won	
Fan Fiction Film Festival	2022	Audience Award - Best Performances	Pulp Friction	Won	
San Diego Film Awards	2022	Best Original Screenplay	Mark Atkinson	Nominated	
San Diego Movie Awards	2022	Best Comedy/Dramedy - Summer	Tony Olmos, Mark Atkinson	Won	
San Diego Film Week	2022	Best Comedy Film	Tony Olmos, Mark Atkinson	Nominated	
Southeast New England Film, Music & Arts Festival	2022	Best Acting - Comedy	Elliott Branch Jr.	Won	
Night of Comedy Shorts	2022	Best Parody - 2nd period	Tony Olmos, Mark Atkinson	Won	
Silicon Beach Film Festival	2023	Best Comedy/Parody Short	Pulp Friction	Won	
Award This!	2023	Award This! Short Film	Pulp Friction	Nominated	
