= The Power Agent =

2020 film by Mark Atkinson

- Poster
- Directed by: Mark Atkinson
- Written by: Mark Atkinson
- Produced by: Mark Atkinson
- Starring: Mark Atkinson; Jeff Krapf; Charlie Krapf
- Cinematography: Aiden Keltner
- Edited by: Daniel N. Butler
- Music by: Paul Cincotta
- Production company: Kahuna Productions
- Distributed by: San Diego International Airport Arts Program
- Release dates: August 2020 (Oceanside International Film Festival); October 4, 2021 (San Diego International Airport)
- Running time: 5 minutes
- Country: United States
- Language: English

The Power Agent is a 2020 comedy short film written and directed by Mark Atkinson. The film stars Atkinson, Jeff Krapf and Charlie Krapf.

== Plot ==
An actor seeks advice from his agent.

== Cast ==
- Mark Atkinson as Mark
- Jeff Krapf as Dad
- Charlie Krapf as Charlie

== Production ==
Atkinson is the film's writer, director, producer and star. Aiden Keltner was the film's director of photography, Daniel N. Butler was the editor and Justin Burquist was the gaffer. It is a coming of age short film made in San Diego.

== Release ==
The film screened at Oceanside International Film Festival, San Diego International Film Festival, SENE Film Festival, Block Island Film Festival and Borrego Springs Film Festival. In 2021, it was distributed by San Diego International Airport's Film Program.

== Reception ==
=== Critical response ===
Alan Ng at Film Threat scored it 7.5 out of 10 saying "it gets right to the point" and that it's "funny and squeezes all the cuteness it can get out of young Charlie Krapf’s cinematic debut."

=== Accolades ===
List of awards and nominations
Festival	Year	Award	Recipient(s)	Result	Ref.
Show Low Film Festival	2021	Best Youth Acting	Charlie Krapf	Won	
Show Low Film Festival	2021	Best Mockumentary	The Power Agent	Won	
Imperial County Film Commission Comedy Film Festival	2021	Best Film	The Power Agent	3rd Place	
Idyllwild International Festival of Cinema	2021	Best Short Film	The Power Agent	Nominated	
Idyllwild International Festival of Cinema	2021	Best Director - Short	Mark Atkinson	Nominated	
Idyllwild International Festival of Cinema	2021	Best Screenplay - Short	Mark Atkinson	Nominated	
Idyllwild International Festival of Cinema	2021	Best Child Actor	Charlie Krapf	Nominated	
Oceanside International Film Festival	2020	Best Actress	Charlie Krapf	Nominated	
