= Justin Burquist =

American filmmaker

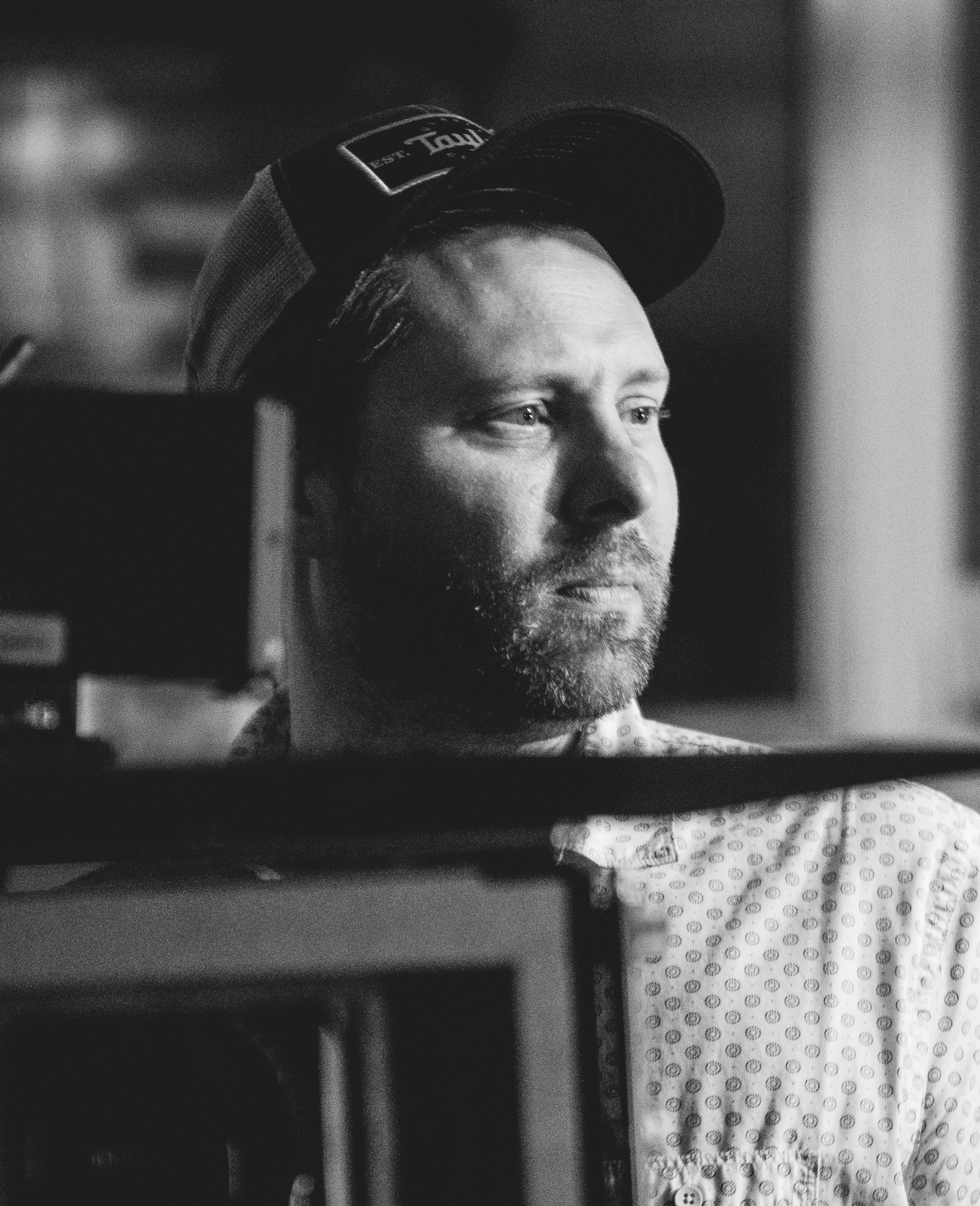
- Burquist in 2024
- Education: Holtville High School; Imperial Valley College; San Diego State University Imperial Valley Campus
- Occupations: Film director; screenwriter; cinematographer; film producer; music video director
- Years active: 2009–present
- Known for: Broken Knuckles; Touch
- Notable credits: Hemet, or the Landlady Don't Drink Tea; Pulp Friction
- Awards: List of Awards
- Website: jburq.com

Justin Burquist is an American filmmaker and music video director who directed the films Broken Knuckles (2013), Touch (2022), and was the cinematographer for the films Hemet, or the Landlady Don't Drink Tea (2023) and Pulp Friction (2021). Burquist's films have won awards at Oceanside International Film Festival and Berlin Short Film Festival.

== Early life ==
Burquist grew up in El Centro and Imperial County, California. He got involved in filmmaking at a young age after his brother brought home a video camera from school. He graduated from Holtville High School in 2001, attended Imperial Valley College and graduated from San Diego State University Imperial Valley Campus in Calexico before moving to Kensington, San Diego.

== Career ==
Burquist started his career making short films and music videos, directing videos like Glitter Star by Dynamite Doll. He helped pitch the idea for the Imperial Valley Film Festival which began in 2010, and his work is often submitted there.

In 2013, Burquist started production on the second season of the web series Proxy titled Proxy 2: The Mortido, citing Brian De Palma and Andrei Tarkovsky as influences. He completed a music video in 2019 that he had been working on for more than five years.

Burquist was the director of photography on a dystopian film called Hemet, or the Landlady Don't Drink Tea which screened at the 13th Oceanside International Film Festival in 2024. He later produced a slasher romcom titled A Corpse in Kensington.

=== Touch short film ===
Burquist's short film Touch screened at Monster Fest in 2022, opening for the premiere of The Cost by Matthew Holmes. In 2023, it screened at Berlin Short Film Festival, Oceanside International Film Festival, and the San Diego Comic-Con Independent Film Festival, where Burquist was a panelist with actors Eva Ceja and Randy Davison. It was released on Klipist and received positive reviews.

== Personal life ==
Burquist currently resides in San Diego, California.

== Filmography ==
Year	Title	Director	Writer	Producer	Cinematographer	Notes
2009	Lou's Place	Yes	Yes	Yes	Yes	Short film
2011	Proxy	Yes	Yes	Yes	No	Web series
2013	Broken Knuckles	Yes	Yes	Yes	No	Short film
2013	Between Bullets	Yes	No	No	No	Web series featuring James Kyson
2014	Twisted Road	Yes	Yes	Yes	No	Short film
2016	A Quintmas Carol	Yes	No	No	No	Short film, also editor
2021	Pulp Friction	No	No	No	Yes	Short film
2022	Touch	Yes	Yes	No	No	Short film
2023	Hemet, or the Landlady Don't Drink Tea	No	No	No	Yes	
2025	Full Tilt Boogie, Daddy-O	No	No	No	No	Gaffer
TBA	A Corpse in Kensington †	No	No	Yes	No	Also gaffer
TBA	Fall of Giselle †	No	No	No	Yes	Directed by Brian Patrick Butler
TBA	Pinhole †	No	No	No	Yes	Directed by Derrick Acosta
TBA	Vape Witch †	Yes	Yes	No	Yes	Short film

Key
†	Denotes films that have not yet been released

== Accolades ==
Festival	Year	Award	Title	Result	Ref.
Oceanside International Film Festival	2013	Best Picture – Audience Choice	Broken Knuckles	Won	
Idyllwild International Festival of Cinema	2022	Juan Ruiz Anchia Award for Best Cinematography	Pulp Friction	Nominated	
Berlin Short Film Festival	2023	Best Horror Short Film – Audience Choice	Touch	Won	
Imperial Valley Film Festival	2013	Best Cinematography	Broken Knuckles	Won	
Various Artists independent Film Festival	2017	Best Comedy	A Quint-mas Carol	Won	
Imperial Valley Film Festival	2017	Best Music Video	One Hundred Twenty by Emerald Portal	Won	
San Diego Film Awards	2023	Best Narrative Short Film	Touch	Won	
San Diego Film Awards	2023	Best Director	Touch	Nominated	
Brightside Tavern Film Festival	2024	Best Director Horror/Thriller	Touch	Nominated	
Brightside Tavern Film Festival	2024	Best Horror/Thriller	Touch	Nominated	
Brightside Tavern Film Festival	2024	Best Concept	Touch	Nominated	
