= Arabia Shanklin =

American naval officer, former track athlete, and actress

- Born: Arabia Littlejohn
- Other name: Arabia Essence
- Education: Steubenville High School; United States Naval Academy
- Occupations: Naval officer; actress
- Military career
- Allegiance: United States
- Branch: United States Navy

Arabia Shanklin (née Littlejohn), also known professionally as Arabia Essence, is an American United States Navy officer, former collegiate track and field athlete, and actress who is the subject of the Proudly She Served portrait series honoring women who served in the United States Armed Forces.

== Early life and education ==
Shanklin was raised in Steubenville, Ohio, and graduated from Steubenville High School in 2009. She competed as an athlete and was a two-time All-Ohio and All-Academic selection in track. Shanklin also served on the local American Red Cross and was the first high-school liaison elected to the local YWCA board of directors. She graduated from the United States Naval Academy in 2013 and was commissioned as a Navy officer.

== Career ==
=== Athletics ===
Shanklin, known then as Littlejohn, competed on the Navy Midshipmen women's track and field team. She was on the Patriot League's 4 × 400-meter relay teams in 2010 and 2011 and won the indoor 400-meter championship in 2011 and 2012, earning first-team All-Patriot League honors.

=== Naval career ===
Shanklin was a surface warfare officer assigned to the USS Simpson (FFG-56) and USS Whidbey Island (LSD-41), and had assignments with I Marine Expeditionary Force and Expeditionary Strike Group Three.

While serving aboard Simpson, she was deployed to Casablanca, Morocco in 2014. In 2017, Vogue included Shanklin, then identified as Littlejohn, in a feature about Black women supporting their natural hair in the U.S. military. She went on to co-found the United States Naval Academy Minority Association.

In 2021, Shanklin was one of 12 women featured in Proudly She Served, an appreciation for women who served in the United States military.

=== Acting ===
Shanklin was cast as Bonnie in the 2021 short comedy film Pulp Friction, co-directed by Mark Atkinson and Tony Olmos.
