= 3 Little Kungpoo Goats =

2022 Iranian film by Farzad and Kianoush Dalvand

- Directed by: Farzad Dalvand; Kianoush Dalvand
- Written by: Darioush Dalvand; Bahram Heidari; Eliza Ip
- Based on: Shangoul and Mangoul
- Produced by: Darioush Dalvand
- Starring: Jon Allen; Caroline Amiguet; Zack Andrews; Mark Atkinson; Brian Patrick Butler; Robert Clark; Jacob Farry; Krista Feallock; Mark Christopher Lawrence; Tiffany Loui; Kaitlyn McCormick; M. Keala Milles Jr.; Connie Terwilliger; Melissa Tozeski
- Music by: Mark Willott
- Animation by: Reza Moazami Farahani
- Production company: Aria Animation Studio
- Distributed by: Phoenix Animation Studio
- Release dates: September 10, 2022 (World Festival of Animated Film); April 13, 2023 (Russia); May 24, 2024 (Turkey)
- Running time: 89 minutes
- Countries: Iran; China
- Languages: Persian; Chinese; English
- Box office: $365,087

3 Little Kungpoo Goats, also known as The Gools, Shangol and Mongol, Kung Fu Gools, and Keçigiller, is a 2022 animated adventure martial arts film directed by Farzad and Kianoush Dalvand and written by Darioush Dalvand, Bahram Heidari and Eliza Ip. It features the voices of Jon Allen, Caroline Amiguet, Mark Atkinson and Brian Patrick Butler.

The film screened at Red Sea International Film Festival and the 54th International Film Festival of India, had limited theatrical releases in Russia and Turkey, and won Best Director in the animation category at International Film Festival for Children and Youth. It has grossed $365,087 worldwide.

== Plot ==
Three young goats go on an adventure to prevent a truce from being broken.

== Cast ==
- Jon Allen as Don Lupo
- Caroline Amiguet as Big Hungry One
- Zack Andrews as Shakhtala
- Mark Atkinson as Hyena
- Brian Patrick Butler as One Leg
- Robert Clark as One Horn
- Jacob Farry as Albino
- Krista Feallock as Shangool
- Mark Christopher Lawrence as Hyena
- Tiffany Loui as Bunny Mom
- Kaitlyn McCormick as Bunny Bob
- M. Keala Milles Jr. as Helper
- Connie Terwilliger as Nazboozi
- Melissa Tozeski as Mangool

== Production ==
Production began in 2015. The film features martial arts as a key component to the story and is based on a legend that inspired Shangoul and Mangoul and The Wolf and the Seven Young Goats.

The film was translated in five languages with Kaitlyn McCormick, Brian Patrick Butler, Caroline Amiguet, and Mark Atkinson as part of the English-language cast, and Hootan Shakiba, Hamed Ahangi, Hooman Haji Abdollahi, Behnoush Bakhtiari, and Hadi Kazemi included for the Persian-language cast. Kianoush Dalvand said the script was originally a very serious story with a different title, and required a rewrite to appeal to children under the age of 12.

== Release ==
The film was expected to release in 2021 under the title The Gools in the United States and Kung Fu Gools in China. It was included the film lineup as The Gools at 2022 Marché du Film through Iuvit Media Sales and again in 2025 as 3 Little Kungpoo Goats through Galloping Entertainment.

It premiered as The Gools on September 10, 2022, at World Festival of Animated Film in Varna, Bulgaria and had a limited theatrical release in Russia on April 13, 2023. Later in 2023, the film premiered in Asia under the title Three Little Kungpoo Goats at the 54th International Film Festival of India, followed by Red Sea International Film Festival and 14th Cairo International Animation Forum. It was distributed by Phoenix Animation Studio. Other festivals include the Warsaw Film Festival and Sundance Children's Film Festival. On May 24, 2024, the film had a limited theatrical release as Keçigiller in Turkey. As of October 2024, the film grossed $365,087 worldwide.

The film had a theatrical release in Iran on November 20, 2024.

== Reception ==
=== Critical response ===
On episode 30 of Haft, animator Bahram Azimi said that the "execution of this animation was very good; to the point that I couldn't believe that its creators didn't have help from outside" and agreed with the filmmakers that it was given an unfair number of screenings for its theatrical release. Ravanbakhsh Sadeghi praised the direction by saying "one of the main advantages is that the Dalvand brothers have followed an international model."

Hossein Abdollahi Kermani at iNAGHD called the film a weak, blind imitation that lacked cultural elements.

=== Accolades ===
Event	Year	Award	Recipient(s)	Result	Ref.
Golden FEMI Film Festival	2024	Best 3D Animation Film	3 Little Kungpoo Goats	Won	
International Film Festival for Children and Youth	2024	Best Director -Animation	Farzad Dalvand, Kianoush Dalvand	Won	
