= Brooklyn United =

Brooklyn United may refer to:

- Brooklyn Northern United AFC, a New Zealand association football team
- Brooklyn United FC, a former United States association football team
- Brooklyn United (film): a 2014 short film by Tracey Anarella
