= Skin: The Movie =

2018 film by Ronn Kilby

- Poster
- Directed by: Ronn Kilby
- Written by: Ronn Kilby
- Produced by: Marti Kilby; Ronn Kilby
- Starring: Mark Christopher Lawrence; Diane Sargent; Michelle Way; Angel Cassidy; Merrick McCartha; Mark Atkinson; Karl Backus; "Shotgun Tom" Kelly; Kirin Kim; Thais Maya
- Cinematography: Eric J. Addison; Tom Antl; Ronn Kilby
- Edited by: Michael Towe
- Production company: Ronn Kilby Creative
- Distributed by: FilmFestDistribution
- Release dates: November 28, 2018 (San Diego, California); April 14, 2020 (VOD)
- Running time: 51 minutes
- Country: United States
- Language: English
- Budget: $15,000

Skin: The Movie is a 2018 American comedy film written and directed by Ronn Kilby. The film stars Mark Christopher Lawrence, Diane Sargent, Michelle Way, Merrick McCartha and "Shotgun Tom" Kelly.

== Plot ==
Blanche, a Minnesota woman in her forties, wants to be a writer but settled for the life of a publisher's researcher in Minneapolis. Her long lost father is a born entrepreneur, making a small fortune in the Los Angeles and San Diego porn industry. Though he died, that doesn't keep him from directing Blanche by way of a DVD he left behind. But Melissa feels the business should be hers.

== Cast ==
- Mark Christopher Lawrence as Marvin
- Diane Sargent as Amber
- Angel Cassidy as Bikini Babe With Dog
- Michelle Way as Blanche
- Merrick McCartha as Hitchcock
- Duane Weekly as "Spike"
- Jack Emmel as Construction Worker
- Mark Atkinson as "Beaver"
- Karl Backus as Lance
- Erik Carpenter as "Gladiator"
- 'Shotgun Tom' Kelly as Morning Jock
- Chunzi He as SF Employee
- Theresa Layne as Melissa
- Kirin Kim as Kelly
- Thais Maya as Twins One & Two
- Charlie Steele as Stuart
- Oscar Camarillo as "Cowpoke"
- Kayla Coburn as Sexy Cop
- Leah Lebzelter as Legal Assistant
- Bryce Alexander as SF Employee

== Production ==
Kilby originally penned a one hundred page script that was entered into the Screenplay Competition at Beverly Hills Film Festival. Years later he realized it was worth rewriting as a smaller project and set up a GoFundMe to fund the film with a micro budget. The rewritten forty page project was shot over twenty days for $15,000. Kilby dedicated the project to his sister Peggy.

== Release ==
The film screened at Idyllwild International Festival of Cinema, Indie Short Fest, Global Indie Film Fest and Hobnobben Film Festival. It was released on video on demand on April 14, 2020.

== Reception ==
=== Critical response ===
In a review by Rome Prisma Film Awards, they found the film interesting, "technically well done" and "the only downside being an original score." Nami Melumad at New York Film Awards praised the film for its direction, performances, storyline, pacing and music. Roy Zafrani at Los Angeles Film Awards said it is “a small indie film with a big heart.” Michelle Way received recognition for a “well done” performance, winning Best Actress at Actor Awards. Mark Christopher Lawrence won for Best Supporting Actor.

=== Accolades ===
List of awards and nominations
Festival	Year	Award	Recipient(s)	Result	Notes
World Music & Independent Film Festival	2020	Best Supporting Actress in a Feature Film	Diane Sargent	Won	
World Music & Independent Film Festival	2020	Best Supporting Actor in a Feature Film	Mark Atkinson	Won	
World Music & Independent Film Festival	2020	Best Director in a Feature Film	Ronn Kilby	Won	
Burbank International Film Festival	2019	Comedy - Short Films	Skin: The Movie	Nominated	
Highway 61 Film Festival	2019	First Place - Comedy Feature	Skin: The Movie	Won	
