= Concert Heroes =

Comedy film directed by Joe Nunez

- Directed by: Joe Nunez
- Written by: Steven Mark; Robert Weinberger
- Produced by: Steven Mark; Joe Nunez; Robert Weinberger
- Starring: Chris Kattan; Joe Nunez; Robert Romanus; E. G. Daily; David DeLuise; Ken Davitian; Eddie McClintock; Gleb Savchenko; Ryan Ochoa; Carolyn Hennesy; Josh Sussman
- Cinematography: Willy Laszlo
- Production companies: Steven Mark Productions; Olympus Studios
- Country: United States
- Language: English

Concert Heroes is an upcoming American comedy film directed by Joe Nunez in his feature film debut and written by Steven Mark and Robert Weinberger. It stars Chris Kattan, Nunez, Robert Romanus, and E. G. Daily.

== Premise ==
When a videographer who shoots local bar bands gets the opportunity of a lifetime - to document the farewell tour of his musical heroes - he's thrust into a whirlwind of obsessive superfans, backstage chaos, and a ruthless rival determined to undermine him. As the tour unfolds, he discovers that the true rock stars aren't the ones on stage, but the people who dedicate their lives to making the show happen.

== Cast ==
- Chris Kattan as Stan
- Joe Nunez as Peter
- Robert Romanus as The Guy
- E. G. Daily as Betty
- David DeLuise as Francis
- Ken Davitian as Jasper
- Eddie McClintock as Gash
- Gleb Savchenko as Tank the Plumber
- Ryan Ochoa as Diaper Jim
- Carolyn Hennesy as Erma
- Josh Sussman as Jonesy
- Maria Libri as Margaret
- Richard Cotovsky as Chuck
- Rasika Mathur as Sue Sue
- Chad Wolf
- Rudy Quintanilla as Esteban
- Randy Davison as William
- Brooke McCormick as Linda
- Mark Atkinson as Zeke

== Production ==
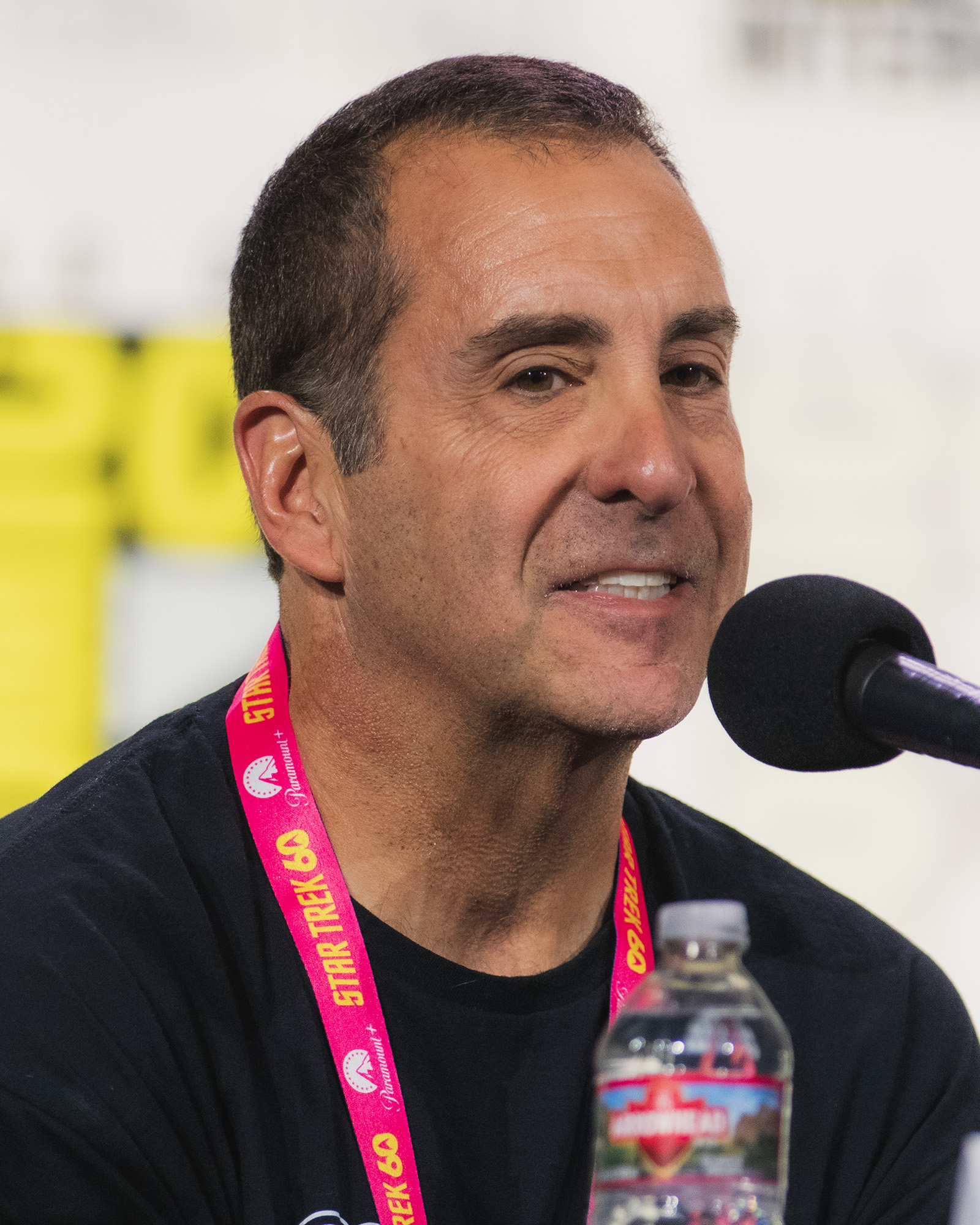
Writer and producer Steven Mark

The film is Joe Nunez's directorial debut. It stars Nunez and Chris Kattan, and is about two filmmakers hired to film a classic rock band during their farewell tour. Most of the filming took place at Encore Event Center and Spark Studio in Kearny Mesa, San Diego. The band Carolina Liar contributed their music to the film. Vanguard Culture discussed the film as turning point for film production in San Diego, comparing it to other films made in the region like Attack of the Killer Tomatoes: Organic Intelligence and One Battle After Another.

== San Diego Comic-Con ==
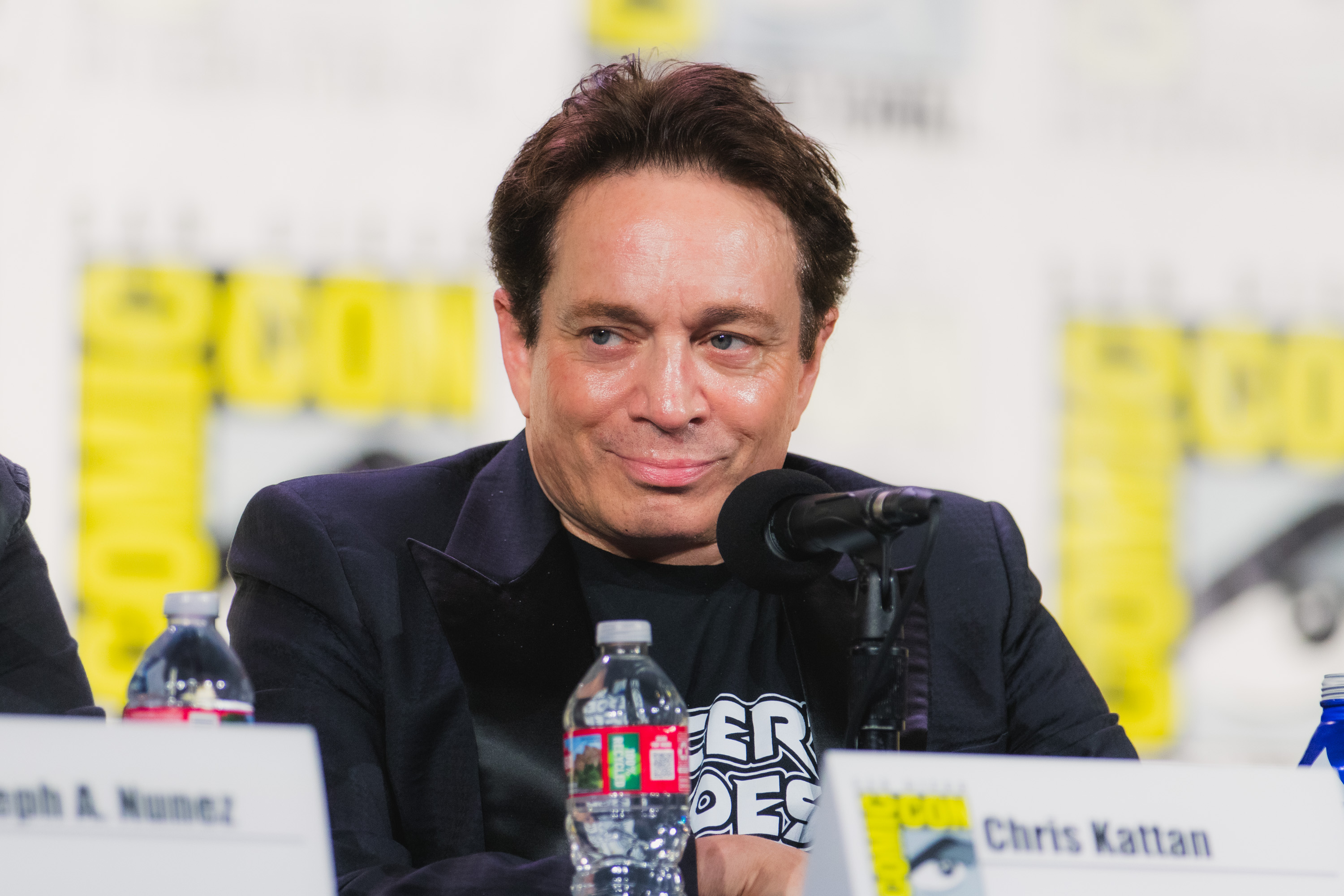
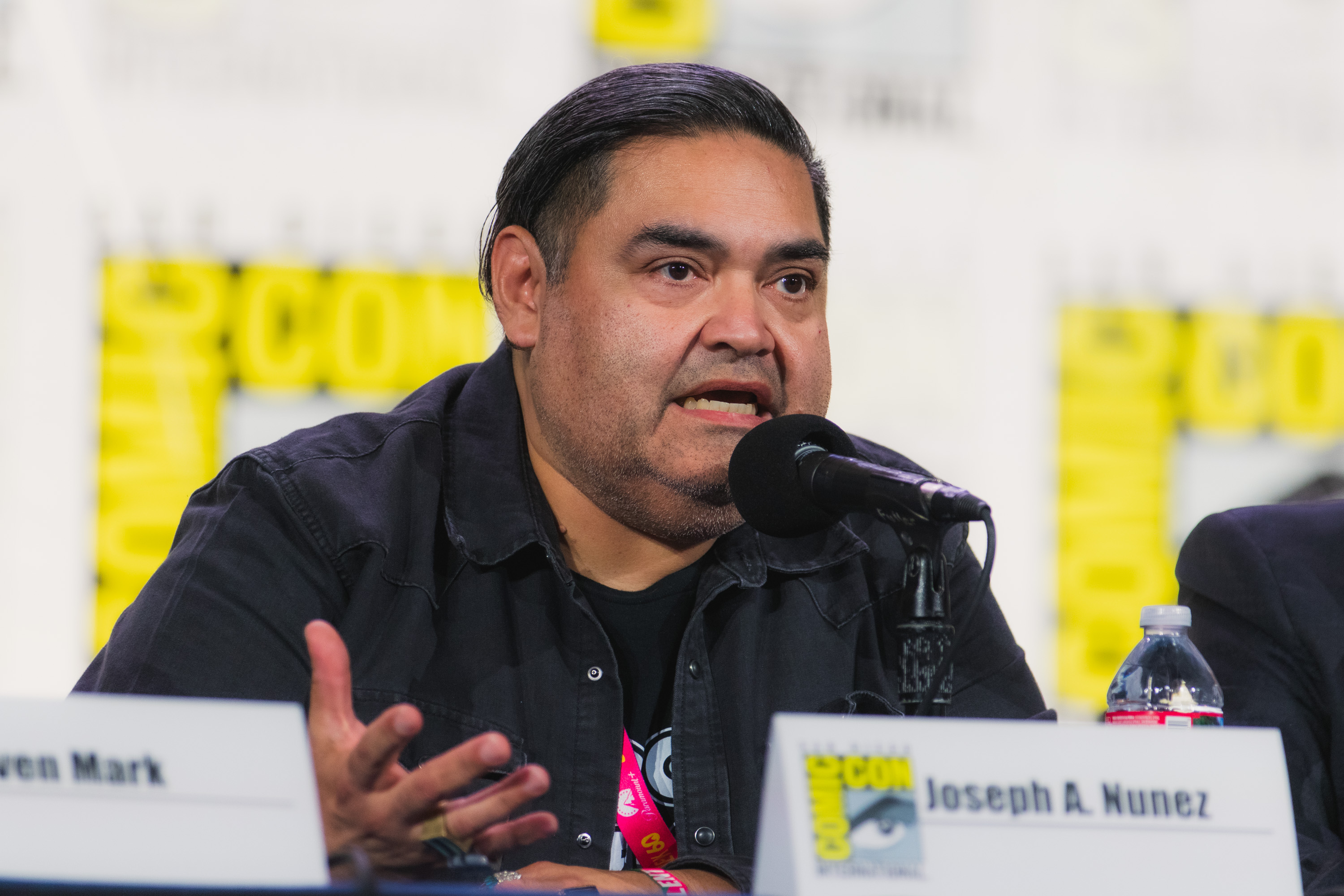
Kattan and Nunez at San Diego Comic-Con 2026

In July 2026, it was announced that Nunez, Mark, and some of the cast will appear at San Diego Comic-Con to premiere the film's trailer and other clips. Martin Cid Magazine wrote about how unusual it is for a film outside of a franchise or studio production to have an opportunity for a panel at one of the event's larger venues.

== See also ==
- No Air Guitar Allowed
