= Torabi =

Torabi is a surname. Notable people with the surname include:

- Farkhondeh Torabi (born 1965), Iranian animation director
- Farnoosh Torabi (born 1980), Iranian-American journalist, author, television personality and personal finance expert
- Kavus Torabi (born 1971), British-Iranian musician and composer, record label owner and broadcaster
- Mehdi Torabi (born 1994), Iranian footballer
- Mehraneh Mahin Torabi (born 1957), Iranian actress
