= Hemet, or the Landlady Don't Drink Tea =

2023 American film by Tony Olmos

- Poster
- Directed by: Tony Olmos
- Written by: Brian Patrick Butler
- Produced by: Tony Olmos
- Starring: Kimberly Weinberger; Brian Patrick Butler; Aimee La Joie; Randy Davison; Merrick McCartha; Matthew Rhodes; Nick Young; Pierce Wallace
- Cinematography: Justin Burquist
- Edited by: Brian Patrick Butler
- Music by: Anton Elms
- Production companies: Charybdis Pictures; Rosewood Five
- Distributed by: BayView Entertainment
- Release dates: November 18, 2023 (San Diego Film Week); November 26, 2024 (VOD)
- Running time: 89 minutes
- Country: United States
- Language: English
- Budget: $29,000

Hemet, or the Landlady Don't Drink Tea is a 2023 American satirical comedy horror film directed by Tony Olmos and written by Brian Patrick Butler. Butler also leads the ensemble cast that includes Kimberly Weinberger, Aimee La Joie, Randy Davison, Merrick McCartha, and Nick Young. Olmos and Butler produced the film together through their companies Rosewood Five and Charybdis Pictures. The story focuses on tenants who grapple with each other while attempting to oust their fascistic landlord.

The film is set in a fictional dystopia in Riverside County, California but was filmed in San Diego County with a microbudget in 2021. Some key aspects of the film involve capitalism and fairy tales, as well as slasher film and zombie apocalypse tropes. The film premiered in 2023 at Digital Gym Cinema for San Diego Film Week, screening at Oceanside International Film Festival and Hemet Film Festival in 2024. It was released on video on demand on November 26, 2024, where it was distributed by BayView Entertainment.

The film was received as a political satire with mixed reviews from critics. Some complimented the originality, humor, special effects, and performances of Weinberger and Butler, while others found issues with pacing, some dialogue, and unlikable characters. Butler received nominations for acting, screenplay, and editing at the 13th Oceanside International Film Festival.

== Plot ==
During an epidemic in Hemet that is turning bath salt users into cannibals, landlady Liz Topham-Myrtle grows more vicious toward her tenants every day. For some, she revokes privileges such as their parking spot, while others face eviction, all for no reason other than Liz's seemingly random cruelty. With the local law enforcement also under her thumb, Liz seems unstoppable.

A tenant named Rosie tolerates Liz out of fear of what might happen if she is evicted, while Gary devises a plan to overthrow his oppressor. When Gary begins enacting his plan, Liz amps up her abuse of the tenants, drawing Rosie into a web of paranoia that hurtles them all down a path of explosive violence.

== Cast ==
- Kimberly Weinberger as Rosie Perkins
- Brian Patrick Butler as Liz Topham-Myrtle
- Aimee La Joie as Kate Myrtle
- Randy Davison as Sheriff Hunting
- Merrick McCartha as Martin
- Matthew Rhodes as Gary
- Nick Young as Tank
- Pierce Wallace as Howie Stumpp
- Jake Golden as Willy Christensen
- Mia Gascon as Emma Myrtle
- Derrick Acosta as Mickey
- Mark Atkinson as Keith
- Aleksander D'Avignon as Jason
- Sandy Nissou as Madeleine Duncan
- Michael J. Kim as Prostitute
- Mark Allyn as President Phil Graves
- Derrick Mangin as Deputy
- Alice Bé as Homeless Woman
- Marie Cuvadar as Newscaster
- Tony Gorodeckas as T.V. Reporter
- Scott Schramp as New Tenant
- Tanya Ruth Linsdau as New Tenant
- Roger Guy English as Saltie
- Savannah Hayworth as Saltie
- Allie Pizzo as Saltie

== Production ==
The setting of film is Hemet, in Riverside County, California.

Brian Patrick Butler came up with the idea in 2018 and principal photography took place in the summer of 2021 in San Diego County, California. He said by the time he was finishing the script, at the start of the COVID-19 pandemic, he had "much more material to work with" than when he'd started, referring to the state of the world. Kimberly Weinberger, who played Rosie, attended college with Butler. Aimee La Joie and Nick Young also worked with Butler on previous film productions.

Butler was also the film's executive producer with his production company Charybdis Pictures. Justin Burquist signed on as the director of photography and Tony Olmos as director. Olmos' company Rosewood Five produced the film in association with Rob Padilla Jr. of Irontree Entertainment. The budget of the film was $29,000 and the setting is in Hemet, California. Exterior scenes were filmed in Ramona, California and interior shots in La Jolla.

== Genres and themes ==
=== B movie slasher ===
Battle Royale With Cheese said it has "Texas Chainsaw Massacre influence." Film Carnage indicated the film is "playing by its own rules and embracing the b-movie vibe." Film Purgatory suggested a complex addition to the genre, calling it a "B-movie with A-movie ideas." 1428 Elm noted slasher elements. Film Threat said it matches the tone of The Texas Chainsaw Massacre 2, "but with the energy of a stage play" and About Boulder noted Butler's character resembles "Granny Leatherface." Horrorverse said it is as if Butler is "taking cues from Leatherface, circa The Texas Chainsaw Massacre: The Next Generation."

=== Capitalism and political satire ===
Some critics said the film centers around capitalism.

Jim McLennan at Film Blitz said the film "takes wild, swinging punches at everything from capitalism to pandemic response," noting "The apartment complex stands in for society in microcosm". He also acknowledged an expansion of ideas from Butler's previous screenplay Friend of the World, "while remaining an exercise in the world falling apart when subjected to external pressures." Film critic Eddie Harrison suggested the film "aims to take down the American/capitalist dream in bloody, unpleasant fashion." Elements of Madness compared the foul-mouthed political nature of the film to William Shakespeare, saying the film "speaks to the current groundlings about relevant issues of housing, community, safety, and the failure of the U.S. government to take care of its citizenry by focusing on capitalism over people."

Variety stated that it "includes elements of political satire that highlight issues of authority and rebellion." Olmos said it is a political film about "abuse of power and how power corrupts people and can turn neighbor against neighbor." Voices from the Balcony praised the "hysterical, social and political commentary." Film critic Sean Parker at 25YL claims it is "the absurd political satire we need now". Anton Bitel at Projected Figures said, "Tony Olmos' crude dystopian satire pits desperate tenants against a Trumpian lessor – and each other." Film Carnage concluded, "It's as if you merged satire with exploitation and created a strange kind of crooked comedy."

=== Dystopia and fairy tale ===
Morbidly Beautiful said it is set in the "dystopian future with fairy tale aspects." Film critic Anton Bitel also described it as a dystopia with the character Liz resembling "a witch and a troll for the almost fairy tale nature of her wickedness." Stuart Monroe called it a "satirical fairy tale horror." Elements of Madness said the film "fulfills its promise as a fairy tale (Grimm style) that cautions audiences that eating the rich creates a vacuum that's best filled with uplifting forces or we're just going to end up where we started."

=== Zombie apocalypse ===
Critics describe the zombies in the film as people driven homicidal by bath salts. Film Threat called it an epidemic of homeless flesh eaters, and 1428 Elm said there is "a zombie-like narrative and epidemic that plays out", but it is mostly part of the setting. Film Purgatory points out that although the zombies are not the main focus of the story, there are references to Night of the Living Dead filmmaker George Romero and 28 Days Later. Upcoming Horror Films mentioned the Miami cannibal attack and some said the film indirectly references the COVID-19 pandemic.

== Release ==
Hemet premiered on November 18, 2023, at the Digital Gym Cinema as part of San Diego Film Week. It screened at the 13th Oceanside International Film Festival on February 24, 2024 and at the Hemet Film Festival on November 9, 2024. It was released on video on demand on November 26, 2024, and was distributed by BayView Entertainment. In 2025, it was released on Tubi.

== Reception ==
=== Critical response ===
On the review aggregator website Rotten Tomatoes, 58% of 12 critics' reviews are positive, with an average rating of 5.7/10. On the review aggregator website CherryPicks, 68% of reviews are positively represented by two cherries, signifying it is "worth a trip to the theater or catching when you can."

Cain Noble-Davies at FilmInk scored it 15 out of 20, calling it "Tromaesque," comparing it to Delicatessen, Titus Andronicus, Pink Flamingos, and stated Butler "is way too effective at portraying the final boss of all psycho biddies." Noble-Davies claimed it is "bonkers with a purpose. Its tar-black comedy and terrific practical effects underpin a blunt but impactful satire on modern America, pulling various pages from the cannibal's playbook to create a uniquely cracked gem of a film."

J. Zimmerman at Video Librarian highly recommended the film, scoring it 4 out of 5, calling it "a fantastic example of modern satire", "an outstanding fairy-tale-like horror flick with a smarmy edge", and "has great potential to earn the coveted position of a cult classic in the coming decades." Jim Morazzini at Voices from the Balcony gave it a 4 out of 5, saying they were "entertained and amused by this combination of crude humour and smart satire."

Rebecca Cherry at Film Carnage scored it 7 out of 10, describing it as "an interesting and unusual take on a number of current issues." Douglas Davidson at Elements of Madness called it "an entertaining farce that would've felt so far from the truth if not for recent history cementing otherwise," scoring it 3.5 out of 5. Stuart Monroe at Get On My Damn Level said the film is 3.5 out of 5 and "one mean mother of an absurdly surrealistic fairy tale." Charlotte Spark at Morbidly Beautiful gave the film 3.5 out of 5, comparing it to Mad Max Beyond Thunderdome, stating "it didn't fully resonate," but had "strong performances and quite a few laughs." Sean Parker at 25YL drew comparisons to the Coen brothers, Shakespeare, and the films of John Waters.

I think it's more than just profanity that unsettles – it's the themes discussed, the pictures painted with the words. A worldview expressed that is truly despicable.

— Brian Patrick Butler

Bee Delores at Horrorverse said it is "a delightfully campy crime/thriller that possesses thematic relevancy." Jenna Jarvish at Ginger Nuts of Horror compared Hemet to Shaun of the Dead and The Dead Don't Die, but stated it has "a point of view that feels completely fresh." A review at Film Blitz scored it a B− calling it a "malevolent atrocity," comparing it to Tootsie and Monty Python's Flying Circus.

Meredith Brown at Upcoming Horror Films scored it 6 out of 10, saying it has "sharp-witted dialogue and adequate horror humor." Eddie Harrison at film-authority scored it 3 out of 5 and said it is a gore film that is "a biting, scabrous, no-holds barred satire." Norman Gidney at HorrorBuzz scored it 6 out of 10, calling it a "campy little indie nugget of joy." Loron Hays at Reel Reviews scored it 3 out of 5, saying "it doesn't always work, but lightning absolutely crashes when it does."

Brian Fanelli at 1428 Elm said it has "heart, grit, laughs, and bloodshed" and is "for those who like something truly strange and unusual." Celia Payne at Let's Talk Terror said "It's like watching a reality show where they all get to murder each other." Josiah Teal at Battle Royale With Cheese described it as "very Clerks-esque; other moments are straight from the vibes of Tarantino, and even the horrifying hillbilly ethos of early Rob Zombie." They said it has "all the right inspiration to create the wacky, violent film promised, but lacks all the charm to make it a camp classic."

Some critics who did not like the film still gave praise to the performances of Weinberger and Butler. Clotilde Chinnici at Loud and Clear Reviews gave the film 2.5 out of 5, claiming it had "tense atmosphere" but that it "could have landed a lot better if its characters had been explored more." A review at Scared Sheepless also scored it 2.5 out of 5, calling it "a small town thriller with much bigger satire at heart." Tim Brennan at About Boulder compared Butler's writing of dialogue to Quentin Tarantino and Diablo Cody, but said he disliked the similarities between the characters' wry personalities. The Independent Critic scored it 2 out of 4 and said it is "for those who appreciate the ballsier side of indie cinema."

Simon Thompson at Bloody Flicks drew comparisons to The Greasy Strangler, Mrs. Brown's Boys, and Serial Mom, but said that Hemet has "scripting issues," "the swearing is structured around clever wordplay," and it "doesn't help that the film's antagonist Liz, is a pound shop Dame Edna Everage." Ryan Devir at Film Threat said it had "solid gore and impressive kills," but criticized the characters, dialogue and humor, scoring it 3.5 out of 10. Roger Moore at Movie Nation scored it 1 out of 4, stating it has "cultish comedy with a few laughs, undercooked politics and undigested zombie victims."

=== Accolades ===
Festival	Year	Award	Recipient(s)	Result	Ref.
San Diego Film Week	2023	Best Dark Comedy Feature Film	Hemet, or the Landlady Don't Drink Tea	Nominated	
Oceanside International Film Festival	2024	Best Editing in a Feature	Brian Patrick Butler	Nominated	
Oceanside International Film Festival	2024	Best Screenplay (Feature)	Brian Patrick Butler	Nominated	
Oceanside International Film Festival	2024	Best Actor in a Lead Role	Brian Patrick Butler	Nominated	
San Diego Film Awards	2024	Best Makeup/Hair in a Narrative Feature Film	Sandy Nissou, John Aviles, Elizabeth Lawson	Won	
San Diego Film Awards	2024	Best Costume Design in a Narrative Feature Film	Sandy Nissou	Nominated	
San Diego Film Awards	2024	Best Ensemble Cast in a Narrative Feature Film	Various	Nominated	
San Diego Film Awards	2024	Best Lead Actor in a Narrative Feature Film	Brian Patrick Butler	Nominated	
San Diego Film Awards	2024	Best Narrative Feature Film	Tony Olmos, Brian Patrick Butler, Rob Padilla Jr.	Nominated	
San Diego Film Awards	2024	Best Original Screenplay in a Narrative Feature Film	Brian Patrick Butler	Nominated	

== See also ==
- Bath Salt Zombies
- The People Under the Stairs, a 1991 American comedy horror film depicting landlords with similar themes of satire, capitalism and class conflict
- Cannibalism in popular culture
