= Karl Backus =

American actor (born 1963 or 1964)

- Born: Karl Laurence Backus; 1963 or 1964 (age 61–62)
- Education: Southern Oregon University; Asolo Conservatory for Actor Training; Portfolio Center
- Occupations: Actor; art director
- Years active: 1981–present
- Known for: Oregon Shakespeare Festival
- Notable credits: Skin: The Movie; Thane of East County; Walking with the Enemy

Karl Laurence Backus is an American actor and art director who appeared in multiple productions of the Oregon Shakespeare Festival in the 1980s and 90s, a San Diego production of Gross Indecency: The Three Trials of Oscar Wilde (2003), and the films Skin: The Movie (2018), Thane of East County (2015), and Walking with the Enemy (2013). Backus has multiple ensemble nominations at the Idyllwild International Festival of Cinema.

== Career ==
In 1983, Backus was a public service announcer for KBST. He worked as an art director for J. Walter Thompson and in 2015, he was with the San Diego Film Commission.

Backus is a member of the Oregon Shakespeare Festival. He became a member around 1986 and was part of seven teams sponsored by the Napa Valley Opera House assigned to visit over 170,000 students annually across eight states in the Western United States, including Alaska and Hawaii. Following a performance at Edward C. Reed High School, Backus and his coworker were robbed of their equipment and clothing after discovering their car was stolen.

=== Reception ===
Phyllis Wolfe at The Des Moines Register said his performance as Malcolm in Macbeth "hones his battle ax with a low, resounding ring downstage" and brought clarity to his lines. Ron Cowan at Statesman Journal said his performance in Moliere Plays Paris "is briefly but unforgettably seen as a king who offhandedly invents the musical comedy." Steven Winn at SFGate said Backus' scene in Arcadia was the best one, playing "a bored king who is both generous and high-handed." George Weinberg-Harter at Backstage Magazine said Backus' performance as Edward Carson in Gross Indecency: The Three Trials of Oscar Wilde was the "understated seriousness of a complete legal professional."

== Personal life ==
Backus was born to Joyce and Laurence Backus of Central Point, Oregon. He started acting around the time he was 20 and in 1987, graduated from Southern Oregon University with Bachelor of Fine Arts in theatre arts. Backus earned a master's degree in 1992 at Asolo Conservatory for Actor Training. Backus graduated from the Portfolio Center in 1999 and married Summer King in 2000. He studied with José Quintero, Oleg Tabakov and did high school theater with Shelley Malil in 1981.

== Stage credits ==
Theater performances
| Year | Title | Role | Location | Notes |
|---|---|---|---|---|
| | Cloud Nine | Betty / Gerry | American College Theatre Festival | Regional winner |
| | Scapino! | Scapino | Southern Oregon State College, Ashland, Oregon | Mainstage |
| | In a Northern Landscape | Samuel | Southern Oregon State College, Ashland, Oregon | Mainstage |
| | Crimes of the Heart | Barnette | Southern Oregon State College, Ashland, Oregon | Mainstage |
| | Rashomon | Woodcutter | Southern Oregon State College, Ashland, Oregon | Mainstage |
| | Bar & Ger | Bar | Southern Oregon State College, Ashland, Oregon | Studio, by Geraldine Aron |
| | Fire in the Dark | Van Gogh | Southern Oregon State College, Ashland, Oregon | Studio |
| | A Life in the Theatre | John | Southern Oregon State College, Ashland, Oregon | Studio |
| | Miss Julie | Jean | Southern Oregon State College, Ashland, Oregon | Studio |
| 1987–1988 | Macbeth | | Elizabethan Stage, Oregon Shakespeare Festival | |
| 1987–1988 | A Midsummer Night's Dream | | Elizabethan Stage, Oregon Shakespeare Festival | |
| 1987–1988 | The Shoemaker's Holiday | | Elizabethan Stage, Oregon Shakespeare Festival | |
| 1987–1988 | Henry IV, Part One | | Elizabethan Stage, Oregon Shakespeare Festival | |
| 1989 | Cyrano de Bergerac | Apprentice Pickpocket / Boy / Cadet | Elizabethan Stage, Oregon Shakespeare Festival | Featuring Roy Abramsohn |
| 1989 | Two Gentlemen of Verona | | Elizabethan Stage, Oregon Shakespeare Festival | |
| 1993 | Macbeth | Malcolm | Iowa Shakespeare Project, Greenwood Park, Iowa | |
| 1996 | Arcadia | King Louis XIV | Angus Bowmer Theatre, Ashland, Oregon | February |
| 1996 | Arcadia | King Louis XIV | Angus Bowmer Theatre, Ashland, Oregon | June |
| 1996 | Moliere Plays Paris | | Elizabethan Stage, Oregon Shakespeare Festival | By Molière |
| 1996 | Coriolanus | | Elizabethan Stage, Oregon Shakespeare Festival | |
| 1996 | Romeo and Juliet | | Elizabethan Stage, Oregon Shakespeare Festival | |
| 1997 | Romeo and Juliet | Gregory | Elizabethan Stage, Oregon Shakespeare Festival | |
| 2003 | Gross Indecency: The Three Trials of Oscar Wilde | Attorney Edward Carson | San Diego, California | |
| 2004 | Thief River | Middle-aged Ray | Diversionary Theatre, San Diego, California | By Lee Blessing |

School visitation performances
| Year | Title | Location | Notes |
|---|---|---|---|
| 1987 | Romeo and Juliet | Yerington High School | |
| 1987 | The Taming of the Shrew | Yerington High School | |
| 1987 | 'Tis Pity She's a Whore | Yerington High School | |
| 1987 | Shoemaker's Holiday | Yerington High School | |
| 1988 | The Tempest | Little Theater, Kingsburg High School | |
| 1988 | Much Ado About Nothing | Little Theater, Kingsburg High School | |
| 1988 | The Catcher in the Rye | Little Theater, Kingsburg High School | |
| 1988 | Dandelion Wine | Little Theater, Kingsburg High School | |
| 1996 | Henry V | Tumwater Middle School, Portland, Oregon | |
| 1996 | Two Soldiers | Tumwater Middle School, Portland, Oregon | By William Faulkner |
| 1996 | The Butter Battle Book | Tumwater Middle School, Portland, Oregon | |
| 1997 | Shh...Listen To Me | Cloverdale High School, Cloverdale, California | Featuring segments from Two Gentlemen of Verona, In Flanders Fields, and Dancing at Lughnasa |

== Filmography ==
| Year | Title | Role | Notes |
|---|---|---|---|
| 1993 | Hidden Fears | Man at the Y | |
| 2006 | What's the Vig? | Kenneth Hart | |
| 2011 | Misdirection | Simsung | Also executive producer |
| 2013 | Walking with the Enemy | Colonel Klein | |
| 2015 | Thane of East County | Duke | |
| 2016 | A Life Lived | Jefferson | |
| 2016 | Undocumented | Reporter | Short film |
| 2018 | Skin: The Movie | Lance | |
| 2019 | GPS | Malcomb | Short film |
| 2024 | Sincerely Saul | Officer Porter | |

== Accolades ==
| Event | Year | Film | Award | Result |
|---|---|---|---|---|
| Blast Off Film Festival | 2019 | Skin: The Movie | Best Acting Ensemble | Nominated |
| Idyllwild International Festival of Cinema | 2020 | Skin: The Movie | Best Ensemble | Nominated |
| Idyllwild International Festival of Cinema | 2021 | GPS | Best Ensemble Cast | Nominated |
