= Everything Will Be Fine in the End =

- Directed by: Joe Bartone
- Written by: Joe Bartone
- Produced by: Joe Bartone
- Starring: Elsa Kennedy; Cheska Zaide; Kent Harper; Steven Michael Martin; Jonathan Mankuta; Holly Rockwell; Turen Robinson; Ken Forsgren
- Cinematography: Jose Zambrallo Cassena
- Edited by: Joe Bartone; Angel Jimenez Jr. Gavin Minton; Ken Scribner; Michael Zisk
- Music by: Joe Bartone
- Production company: Small Factory
- Distributed by: Filmhub
- Release date: 11 May 2023
- Running time: 96 minutes
- Country: United States
- Language: English

Everything Will Be Fine in the End is a 2023 American crime comedy-drama film written and directed by Joe Bartone, starring Elsa Kennedy, Cheska Zaide, Kent Harper, Steven Michael Martin, Jonathan Mankuta, Holly Rockwell, Turen Robinson and Ken Forsgren.

== Cast ==
- Elsa Kennedy as George
- Cheska Zaide as Renka
- Kent Harper as Buzz
- Steven Michael Martin as Kai
- Jonathan Mankuta as Mank
- Holly Rockwell as Julia
- Turen Robinson as Isaiah
- Ken Forsgren as Tom
- Tracey Anarella as Karen
- Dana Godfrey as Juliette
- Katy Delbis as Patricia Short
- Ara Derderian as himself
- Christine Fullwood as Megan
- Lee Rothstein as Uncle Gus
- Izzy Gerson as Laundry Lady
- Shaunte Palmer as Grant
- Eric Dudinsky as Drummer

== Reception ==
Rich Cross of Starburst rated the film 4 stars out of 5 and called it "impressively distinctive" and "more concerned with its ensemble of oddball underachievers and focused on the disappointments of their precarious existence than with advancing a traditional plot." Bradley Gibson of Film Threat wrote that the film is "infused with quality craftsmanship, despite a small budget." He opined that while the performances are all "listless or over-the-top", it "works in this setting." Lisa Nystrom of FilmInk gave the film a score of 12.5/20 and wrote: "With characters like this, it's hard to know exactly how emotionally invested we're supposed to become in their struggles, but nonetheless this disjointed snapshot into grim lives is bold in its execution." Genevieve Radosti of the Video Librarian rated the film 2 out of 5 stars and wrote that it "runs out of steam by the halfway point, despite its undeniable style and the actors’ best attempts at True Romance-esque characters without a Tarantino screenplay."
