= Digital Gym Cinema =

Movie theater in San Diego, California

- Interactive map of Digital Gym Cinema
- Address: 1100 Market St; San Diego, California; U.S.
- Coordinates: 32°42′42″N 117°09′15″W
- Owner: Ethan van Thillo; Phil Lorenzo
- Screen: 1
- Production: Media Arts Center San Diego

Construction
- Opened: April 2013
- Reopened: April 2022

Website
- digitalgym.org

Digital Gym Cinema, also known as Media Arts Center, is a theater and lounge in San Diego, California, that screens international and independent films. It was founded by Media Arts Center San Diego.

== History ==
Digital Gym Cinema opened in April 2013 after Media Arts Center San Diego relocated from a converted residence in Golden Hill to El Cajon Boulevard. Its purpose and focus was to screen mostly unknown films that were not already available to public audiences. Ethan van Thillo and Phil Lorenzo managed the location.

The original address was at 2921 El Cajon Blvd in North Park before it moved to 1100 Market Street at UC San Diego's Park and Market building in downtown San Diego. The new location had a soft opening in October, 2021 and hosted screenings from the Sundance Film Festival in January, 2022. It reopened in April, 2022. It is a screening location for the San Diego Latino Film Festival, San Diego Comic-Con, and San Diego Film Week.

== Notable films ==
- Somos Mari Pepa
- Camp X-Ray
- Spring
- Chastity Bites
- Tercera llamada
- Carving a Life
- Eternity: The Movie
- Daydream Hotel
- South of 8
- The Big Boss
- Police Story
- The Departed
- Robocop
- Revenge of the Ninja
- Cobra
- Adjunct by Ron Najor
- The Toxic Avenger
- Hemet, or the Landlady Don't Drink Tea
- Everybody Dies by the End
- In the Mood for Love
