= Steubenville City School District =

School district in Ohio, United States

Address
- 611 North Fourth Street Steubenville, Ohio, 43952; United States

District information
- Type: Public
- Grades: PK–12
- Schools: 6
- NCES District ID: 3904482

Students and staff
- Students: 2,841 (2025–2026)
- Teachers: 167.25 (on an FTE basis) (2025–2026)
- Staff: 236.50 (on an FTE basis) (2025–2026)
- Student–teacher ratio: 16.99 (2025–2026)

Other information
- Website: www.rollred.org

The Steubenville City School District is a public school district based in Steubenville, Jefferson County, Ohio, United States.

== Schools ==
- Steubenville High School
- Harding Middle School
- Garfield East Elementary School
- Wells Elementary School
- West Pugliese Elementary School

== Steubenville High School rape case ==
District superintendent Michael McVey and some other district employees have been charged with crimes including obstructing justice in the aftermath of the 2012 rape of a female student by students of Steubenville High School.

== See also ==
- List of school districts in Ohio
