= Ethan van Thillo =

American arts administrator and film programmer

- Education: University of California, Santa Cruz
- Occupations: Arts administrator, film festival founder, musician
- Years active: 1990s–present
- Organization: Media Arts Center San Diego
- Known for: Founding the San Diego Latino Film Festival and Media Arts Center San Diego

Ethan van Thillo is an American arts administrator, film programmer, and musician who founded Media Arts Center San Diego and the San Diego Latino Film Festival. He also developed the Digital Gym Cinema, an independent art-house cinema in San Diego. In 2026, he received a Prebys Leadership Award.

== Early life and education ==
Van Thillo grew up in San Clemente, California, born to a bilingual elementary school teacher. He attended the University of California, Santa Cruz and co-produced a short film called Regeneration. After graduating in 1992, Van Thillo moved to San Diego.

== Career ==
=== San Diego Latino Film Festival ===
Van Thillo began organizing a student film festival known as Cine Estudiantil at University of California, San Diego, based on his experience at UC Santa Cruz. He established what became the San Diego Latino Film Festival in 1994. Inspiration for the festival came in response to the lack of a film event in the area devoted to both Latino filmmakers and audiences on each side of the United States–Mexico border. The festival expanded beyond student films in 1998. In 2000, the North County Times wrote it as one of the more respected Latino film festivals in the United States. In 2011, it was reported to be screening around 160 films to about 20,000 people each year. Times of San Diego wrote that Van Thillo played a key role in developing an audience for Latino filmmaking in the region.

=== Media Arts Center San Diego ===
Van Thillo developed the Media Arts Center San Diego (MACSD) in 1999, expanding his work into year-round film exhibition. Van Thillo said that youth media education making films for social change is a key element to the organization's mission. In 2016, MACSD expanded its Latino-film programming in San Diego's South Bay through Éxitos del Cine Latino.

=== Digital Gym Cinema ===
Van Thillo was also involved in developing the Digital Gym Cinema, an art-house theater operated by Media Arts Center San Diego. In 2014, San Diego Reader described Digital Gym as "indispensable" in its discussion for a screening of Amat Escalante's Heli. Digital Gym later relocated to UC San Diego Park & Market.

== Music ==
Van Thillo played violin from an early age but discontinued after college to raise his family and focus on the Media Arts Center and the San Diego Latino Film Festival. He later took up the mandolin. Together with guitarist and violinist Craig McIntosh and singer Camille Sallave, the trio formed Whiskey & Burlap, an Americana and folk group that started performing in 2018. During the COVID-19 pandemic, performances took place on neighborhood porches in South Park, San Diego. They released the album Around the Bend, which was nominated at the 2022 San Diego Music Awards. The group's followup album was Questioning Why in 2023.

== Recognition ==
In 2026, Van Thillo received the Prebys Foundation Leadership Award which included a $100,000 grant. He was one of five chosen from 200 applicants because of his development in community media programs, Digital Gym Cinema and the San Diego Latino Film Festival.
