= Bob Mike =

American gridiron football player (1918–1981)

- Mike in 1949

No. 47
- Position: Tackle

Personal information
- Born: October 29, 1918; Edison, Georgia, U.S.
- Died: June 29, 1981 (age 62)
- Listed height: 6 ft 1 in (1.85 m)
- Listed weight: 225 lb (102 kg)

Career information
- High school: Steubenville (OH)
- College: Florida A&M, UCLA

Career history
- San Francisco 49ers (1948–1949); Calgary Stampeders (1952–1953)

Career AAFC statistics
- Games played: 26
- Games started: 8
- Stats at Pro Football Reference

Robert Melvin Mike (October 29, 1918 – June 29, 1981) was an American football player who played at the tackle position on both offense and defense. He played college football for Florida A&M and UCLA and professional football for the San Francisco 49ers of the All-America Football Conference (AAFC) and the Calgary Stampeders of the Western Interprovincial Football Union (WIFU).

Mike was just the second African-American to make the roster of the 49ers and was one of only 12 black players in the AAFC during its final season, 1949.

== Early life ==
Mike was born in 1920 in Edison, Georgia. He attended Steubenville High School in Steubenville, Ohio.

== Military and college football ==
Mike played college football for the Florida A&M Rattlers and the UCLA Bruins in 1946 and 1947. He also served in the United States Army Air Forces. While serving in the military, he was stationed at the Tuskegee Army Air Field and played for the Tuskegee football team. During his time at UCLA, the California Eagle described him as "probably the best-known Negro athlete in the Southland." He was teammates at UCLA with Jackie Robinson. Robinson went on to break the color barrier in Major League Baseball. Mike became one of the first African Americans to play in the All-America Football Conference.

He left UCLA in 1948 despite having collegiate eligibility remaining.

== Professional football ==
Mike played professional football in the All-America Football Conference (AAFC) for the San Francisco 49ers during their 1948 and 1949 seasons. He appeared in a total of 26 games for the 49ers, eight of them as a starter.

Mike was the second black player in the history of the 49ers franchise, following halfback Joe "The Jet" Perry. In 1949, the last year of the AAFC, Mike one of just 12 black players in the entire AAFC.

In July 1950, Mike was hired as the 49ers first black scout, assigned to search for black players across the country. He was fired in September 1950 after team owner Tony Morabito saw him with a light-skinned black woman who Morabito believed to be white.

He resumed his playing career in the Western Interprovincial Football Union for the Calgary Stampeders during their 1952 and 1953 seasons. He appeared in 21 games for the Stampeders.

== Family and later years ==
After his playing career ended, Mike accepted a position as the line coach for the Wiley Wildcats in Texas. He died in 1981 at age 62.
