= Jon Allen (actor) =

American voice actor (born 1982)

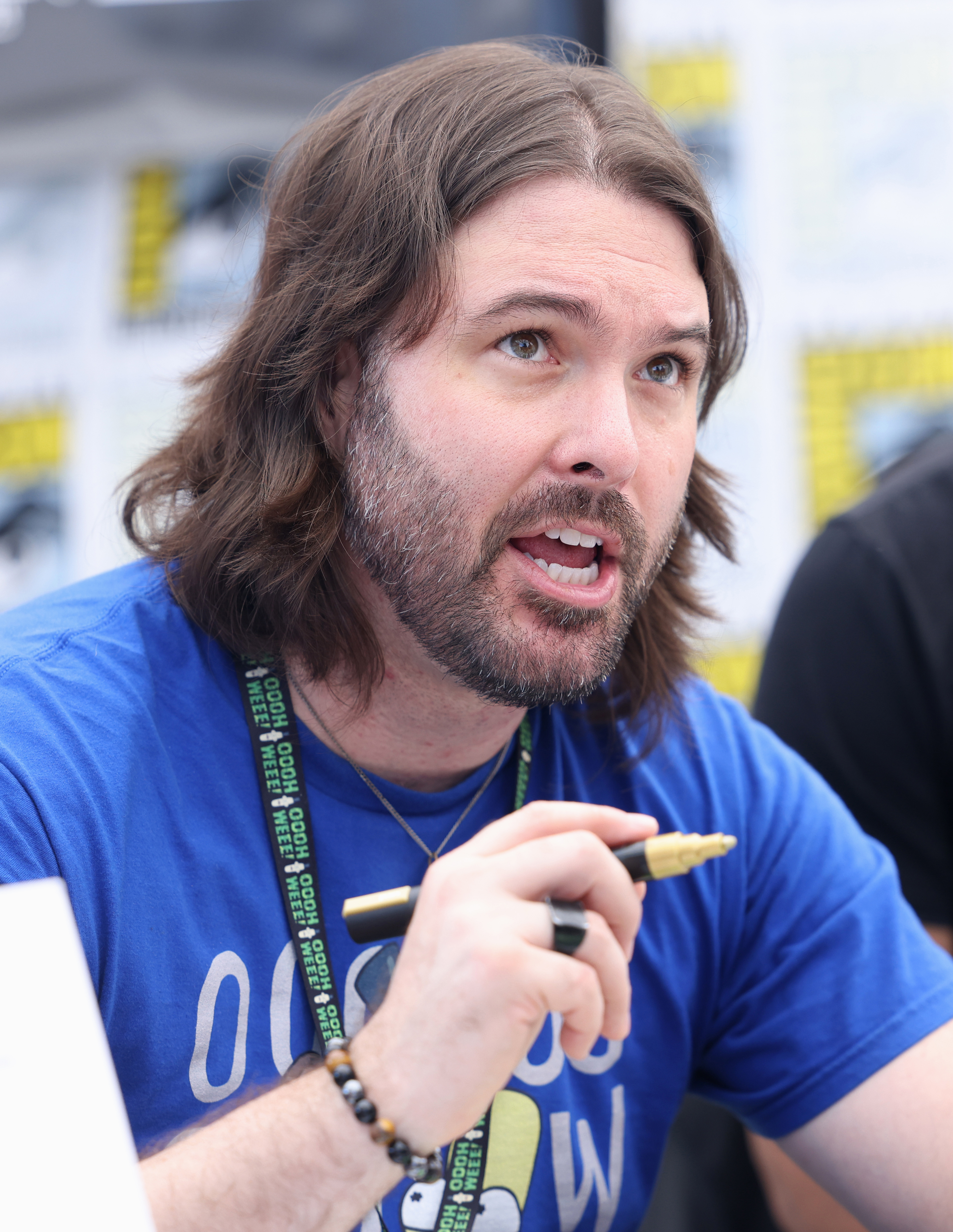
- Allen in 2025
- Born: Jonathan Frederick Allen; August 20, 1982 (age 44); San Diego, California, U.S.
- Other name: John Allen
- Occupation: Voice actor
- Years active: 2001–present
- Known for: Voice acting in anime and video games
- Notable credits: Dragon Ball Super; Mob Psycho 100; Rick and Morty; Sword Art Online

Jonathan Frederick Allen is an American voice actor who appeared in Rick and Morty, Mob Psycho 100, Dragon Ball Super and Sword Art Online.

== Career ==
Allen started his voice acting career in 2001. He frequently contributes his voice to English dub versions of anime and video games. He replaced Justin Roiland as Mr. Poopybutthole on season seven of Rick and Morty. Scott Marder said Allen's role provided room for some of Roiland's other replacements to focus on the main cast.

== Filmography ==
Voice
Year	Title	Role	Notes
2001	Dragon Ball Z	Pink Hat Guy	Uncredited
2007	High Velocity Bowling	Mike the Strike Diaz / Hiro / Jarvis	
2007	PAIN	Jarvis / H8 Squadder	
2013	Hunter x Hunter	Number Zero / Binolt / Kazsule / Nomdieu	4 episodes
2014	SMITE	Krang / Ymir Cryonic Demon / Blazing Tormentor Sylvanus	
2015	JoJo's Bizarre Adventure	Alessi	3 episodes
2016	Mob Psycho 100	Bandai / Edano Tsuyoshi	5 episodes
2016-2017	Mobile Suit Gundam: Iron-Blooded Orphans	Zack Lowe	13 episodes
2017	Dragon Ball Super	Nigrissi	5 episodes
2017-2019	Kakegurui	Emcee	2 episodes
2018	FLCL Progressive	Goro Mori	6 episodes
2019	Pokemon Masters	Brawly / Thornton	
2019	YooHoo to the Rescue	Alvin / Louie	2 episodes
2019-Present	Heroes of Goo Jit Zu	Thrash / Wolfpain / Silverback / Battaxe / Tritops / Verapz / Warsnap / Saturnaut / Squidor / Bowlbreath	13 episodes
2019-2020	Sword Art Online	Critter / Fu Za	5 episodes
2020	Beyblade Burst Rise	Another	3 episodes
2020	Genshin Impact	Ogawa / Kamuna Harunosuke / Yuusaku	
2021	Tasty Tales of the Food Truckers	Sonny / Nageesh / Robo Chef / Bijan / Atlantean King	52 episodes
2021	Cells at Work! Code Black	Red Blood Cell AC1677	11 episodes
2021	Edens Zero	Jamilov / Spider	6 episodes
2022	FriendZSpace	Hamku / Furkira / Arthro / Droom / Wormack / Captain Piddle / Fub 3 / Announcer Piddle / Oddy / Kitus / Cyp	23 episodes
2022	3 Little Kungpoo Goats	Don Lupo	
2023	The Seven Deadly Sins: Four Knights of the Apocalypse	Talisker	3 episodes
2023	Miraculous: Ladybug & Cat Noir, the Movie	The Hunchback	
2023	Honkai Star Rail	Fortune BananAdvisor / Hydra / Gangster 3	
2023-present	Rick and Morty	Mr. Poopybutthole	4 episodes
2024	Sandland the Series	Bandit Leader	2 episodes
2024	Final Fantasy VII Rebirth	Additional Voices	
2024	Mashle: Magic and Muscles	Sitter Baby	1 episode
2024	Ghost Cat Anzu	Tanuki	
2025	Mobile Suit Gundam GQuuuuuuX	Benowa / Chaichi	4 episodes
2025	Go! Go! Loser Ranger!	Nagisa Chabatake / Shochiku Umezawa	2 episodes
2025	Bullet/Bullet	Founder 2/ Additional Voices	1 episode
