= Steubenville High School =

Public high school

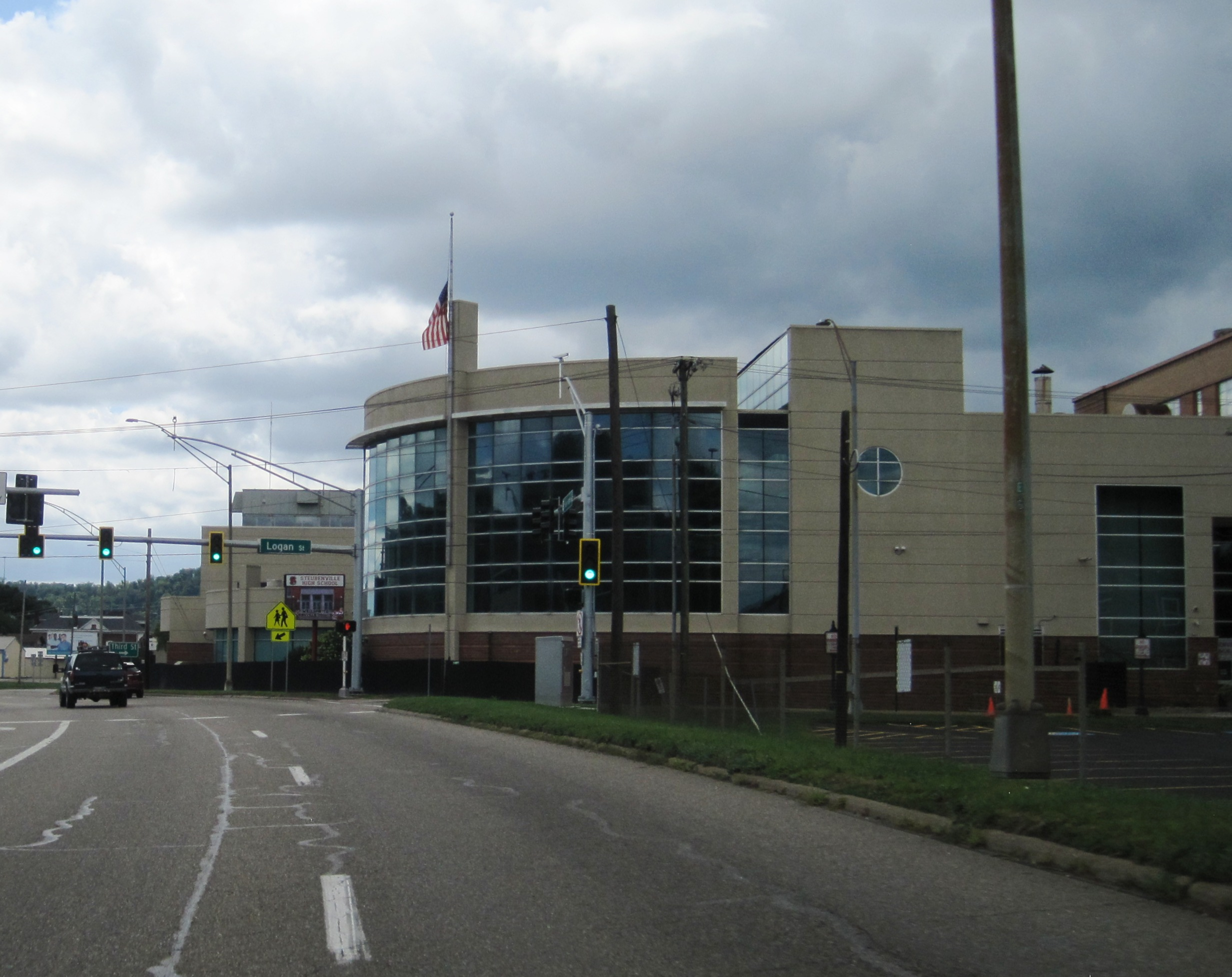
- Front of school along SR 7

Location
- 420 N 4th Street; Steubenville, Ohio 43952; United States; 40°21′54″N 80°36′44″W

Information
- Type: Public, coeducational
- Opened: November 6, 1854
- School district: Steubenville City School District
- Principal: Aaron Newman
- Teaching staff: 43.00 (FTE)
- Grades: 9–12
- Student to teacher ratio: 16.77
- Campus type: Small city
- Colors: Crimson and black
- Athletics conference: Ohio Valley Athletic Conference
- Team name: Big Red
- Accreditation: Ohio Department of Education
- Newspaper: Beacon
- Yearbook: The Steuben
- Website: www.rollred.org/steubenvillehighschool_home.aspx

Steubenville High School is a public high school in Steubenville, Ohio, United States. It is the only high school in the Steubenville City School District.

== Athletics ==
The school offers baseball, basketball, football, golf, soccer, softball, swimming, tennis, track and field, and wrestling. Athletic teams compete as the Steubenville Big Red in the Ohio High School Athletic Association as a member of the Ohio Valley Athletic Conference.

== 2012 Rape and Distribution of Child Pornography Case ==
The school drew international attention after two members of the football team were accused and later convicted of digitally raping, and distributing child pornography of a 16-year-old girl in 2012. The students were seen "joking" about raping a "dead girl" on a 12 minute video. The convicted teens were also charged with the rape of a 14-year-old girl, which occurred only 4 months prior. Four adults were indicted in the cover-up of sexual assault cases involving the school's high school athletes, one being the school coach.

== 2026 Soccer Incident ==
On October 28th, 2026, a Steubenville player body checked a referee after his teammate got a red card, sending the referee to the hospital with broken ribs and a collapsed lung. The video circulated on social media and became a big headline in the news. The local newspaper The Herald-Star stated that "The OHSAA [the Ohio High School Athletics Association] will decide on further discipline after finding out what disciplinary action is taken by the school first, the statement said. The statement indicated that the school’s punishment 'will be significant.'"

== Notable alumni and faculty ==
- Douglas Applegate – U.S. Representative from Ohio (1977–1995)
- Zach Collaros -professional football player in the Canadian Football League (CFL)
- Sylvia Crawley – professional basketball player in the Women's National Basketball Association (WNBA)
- Joe Gilliam Sr. - college football coach
- Paul Hoover – professional baseball player and coach in Major League Baseball
- Calvin Jones – Outland Trophy recipient, professional football player in the CFL, and member of College Football Hall of Fame
- Don Joyce – professional football player in the National Football League (NFL)
- Eddie Kazak – professional baseball player in Major League Baseball
- Dean Martin – singer, actor, and comedian, nicknamed "The King of Cool"
- Bob Mike – professional football player in the All-America Football Conference and NFL
- Najee Murray – professional football player in the CFL
- Will Robinson – college basketball coach and first African American to be a head coach in NCAA Division I history; professional scout in the National Basketball Association (NBA) and NFL
- Arabia Shanklin – United States Navy officer
- Edward Vincent – politician in the California State Legislature and first African American Mayor of Inglewood, California
- Moses Fleetwood Walker – professional baseball player in the American Association and recognized as first African American to play in Major League Baseball
- Weldy Walker – professional baseball player in the American Association and recognized as second African American to play in Major League Baseball
- Johnny Wilson – professional football player in the NFL
