= Not This Part of the World =

1995 film by Phil Atlakson

- Poster
- Directed by: Phil Atlakson
- Written by: Phil Atlakson
- Produced by: Phil Atlakson
- Starring: Adam West; Matt Letscher; Christina Lang; Arthur Glen Hughes; Ashley Martell; Travis Swartz; Tom Willmorth; Randy Davison; Richard Klautsch; Joe Golden
- Cinematography: Jeffrey D. Smith; David Klein
- Edited by: Phil Atlakson
- Music by: Todd Dunnigan
- Production company: Downhouse Productions
- Release date: October 6, 1995 (Boise, Idaho)
- Running time: 107 minutes
- Country: United States
- Language: English
- Budget: $65,000–255,000

Not This Part of the World is a 1995 comedy independent film written and directed by Phil Atlakson in his directorial debut. The film stars Adam West, Matt Letscher and Christina Lang.

== Plot ==
Set on a single day, when former students of Boise High School learn a classmate was killed in a drive-by shooting while doing charity work in South Central LA. They try to remember her as they struggle to find a purpose for their own lives.

== Cast ==
- Adam West
- Matt Letscher
- Christina Lang
- Arthur Glen Hughes
- Ashley Martell
- Travis Swartz
- Tom Willmorth
- Randy Davison
- Richard Klautsch
- Joe Golden

== Production ==
Not This Part of the World is based on a play by Downhouse Productions that was a production in 1993 at the George Street Playhouse. The film adaptation was shot over 27 days in areas south of Kuna and in Boise, Idaho, with a local cast including Adam West and Matt Letscher. It was funded by $65,000 in cash and $190,000 in donations, including a $34,000 grant from the U S West Foundation, the Whittenberger Foundation and Boise State University. Schools Superintendent Anne Fox objected the grant to the Idaho State Department of Education for the film's brief nudity. David Klein worked on the film around his schedule for Mallrats, sharing credit with Jeffrey D. Smith. Atlakson said the film's purpose was to boost filmmaking opportunities in Idaho for the first time in 70 years, since the Nell Shipman-era, something West agreed with.

== Release ==
The film premiered at the Flicks Theater in Boise on October 6, 1995, with a limited release and later screened at the Long Island Film Festival and Sundance Film Festival. It was shopped at the Independent Feature Film Market.

== Reception ==
Not This Part of the World won Best First Feature Film at Long Island Film Festival. Laura Delgado at The Arbiter said some of the dialogue scenes were lengthy but one particular scene with a stuntman was worth the cost.
