= No Air Guitar Allowed =

2012 book by Steve Weinberger

- No Air Guitar Allowed cover
- Author: Steve Weinberger
- Language: English
- Genre: Humor
- Publisher: Tate Publishing & Enterprises
- Publication date: September 2012
- Publication place: United States
- ISBN: 1621479331

No Air Guitar Allowed is a novel by American author Steve Weinberger.

== Background ==
Weinberger said it's a spoof about typical concert goers which has a similar premise to Dazed and Confused, Detroit Rock City, and Get Him to the Greek.

== Reception ==
The Pulse Magazine said the book is "layered with highly entertaining satirical chapters." Isamu Jordan at The Spokesman-Review said "some of his ideas for concert etiquette might seem a little uptight."

== See also ==
- Concert Heroes
