= Richard Cotovsky =

American actor

- Born: Richard Cotovsky; January 13, 1954 (age 72); Chicago, Illinois, U.S.
- Occupations: Actor, Director
- Years active: 1995-present

Richard Cotovsky (born January 13, 1954) is an American character actor of film, stage, and television. He is also a director of stage. He was the artistic director of the Mary-Arrchie Theatre Company.

Richard Cotovsky was born in Chicago, Illinois. He attended Southern Illinois University. He transferred to the University of Illinois at the Medical Center in Chicago to earn a degree in pharmacy. In his senior year, he took introduction to the theater which made him interested in acting.

In 1999, Cotovsky directed Brian Friel's play, "Freedom of the City," at the Mary-Arrchie Theatre Company in Chicago, Illinois. He received a Joseph Jefferson Citation for directing this play which also received best ensemble and production. In 2000, he directed at Chicago, Illinois's Live Bait Theater's the world premiere of the John Susman play "Nelson & Simone". In 2006, he acted in the Sam Shepard play, "Buried Child," at the Mary-Arrchie Theatre Company.

== Filmography ==
Year	Film	Role	Notes
1995	Pictures of Baby Jane Doe	Regenerated Woodman	
1996, 2000	Early Edition	Tools/Bartender	2 episodes
1997	ER	Homeless Man	Episode: Cold Night Into Dawn
1997	The Ride	Mike	
1997	Lionel on a Sunday	Vendor	
1999	Unconditional Love	Homeless man	
1999	Turks	Arcade Manager	Episode: Friends & Strangers
1999	Stir of Echoes	Neighborhood Man	
2002	Design	Plaid Pants Freak	
2003	Mr. Id	Zen	
2004	Bad Meat	Meat Worker 1	
2008	The Professional Interview	Hank	
2009	A Perfect Manhattan	Iggy	
2009	An Evening with Emery Long	Douglass	
2010	Janie Jones	Club Manager	
2016	Office Christmas Party	Salvation Army Collector	
TBA	Concert Heroes		
