= Tracey Anarella =

American documentary film maker

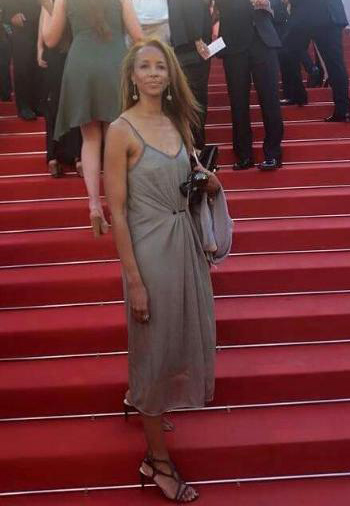
- Tracey Anarella at Cannes Film Festival, France, May 2015
- Born: Tracey Williams Anarella; January 28, 1963 (age 63); Cleveland, Ohio
- Education: Cornell University (1985); Fordham University (2011)
- Occupation: Documentary film maker
- Years active: 2013 – present
- Known for: “Jesse and the Fountain of Youth” (2013), “Not Black Enough” (2017)
- Partner: Peter Fish
- Children: 2
- Awards: Filmmaker of the Year (Austin Revolution Film Festival 2017)
- Website: www.traceyanarella.com

Tracey Anarella (born January 28, 1963) is an American documentary film maker.

== Career ==
Anarella made her debut as the director of Jesse and the Fountain of Youth (2013), an 11-minute documentary about a New York City subway busker. The movie won the "Emerging Artists Award" at the McMinnville Short Film Festival (2013), "Best Short Film" at the Idyllwild International Festival of Cinema (2014) and "Best Documentary" at the Laughlin International Film Festival (2014).

In 2014 Anarella shot a 12-minute documentary Brooklyn United about the Brooklyn United Marching Band. The movie received three nominations at the Idyllwild International Festival of Cinema in 2015 and was featured in the Cannes Short Corner marketplace at the 2015 Cannes Film Festival and at Jecheon International Music & Film Festival (Jecheon, South Korea). She continued with a 10-minute documentary Beautiful Lies (2016) about her father, 87 year-old artist George Williams, who has dementia and talks about his life through his alter ego named Charles. It premiered at 2016 Harlem International Film Festival and later was screened at Laughlin International Film Festival (2016). SENE Film, Art and Music Festival (2017) and YoFiFest (2017).

In 2017, Anarella made Not Black Enough, her first full-length documentary featuring Vanessa Williams, Petey Pablo, Henry Louis Gates Jr. and Florence LaRue. It was featured at WOW Middle Eastern Film Festival (Dubai, United Arab Emirates), The Ethnografilm Festival (Paris, France), at Roxbury Film Festival, Austin Revolution Film Festival, Laughlin International Film Festival, Buffalo Niagara Film Festival, Queens World Film Festival, SENE Film, Art and Music Festival and at International Black Film Festival, Charlotte Black Film Festival, 19th San Francisco Black Film Festival and African Diaspora Film Festival.

In 2017, Anarella started to film Livingston Taylor: Life Is Good, a documentary about American folk musician Livingston Taylor. The movie was partially crowdfunded at Indiegogo.

== Awards and nominations ==
Year	Award	Category	Nominated work	Result
2013	McMinnville Short Film Festival	2013 Best Emerging Artist Award	Jesse and the Fountain of Youth	Won
2013	Idyllwild International Festival of Cinema	Official Selection	Jesse and the Fountain of Youth	
2014	Idyllwild International Festival of Cinema	Best Short Film	Jesse and the Fountain of Youth	Won
2014	SENE Arts, Film and Music Festival	Audience Award for Short Docs	Jesse and the Fountain of Youth	Won
2014	SENE Arts, Film and Music Festival	Honorable Mention	Jesse and the Fountain of Youth	
2014	Rahway International Film Festival	Best Documentary	Jesse and the Fountain of Youth	Won
2014	Accolade Global Film Competition	Award of Merit for Short Documentary Category	Jesse and the Fountain of Youth	Won
2014	Action On Film International Film Festival	Best Short Doc	Jesse and the Fountain of Youth	Nominated
2014	Austin Indie flix Showcase	Best Short Documentary	Jesse and the Fountain of Youth	Won
2014	Rochester International Film Festival	Award of Merit for Short Documentary	Jesse and the Fountain of Youth	Won
2015	SENE Film, Art and Music Festival	Audience Award-Best Short Documentary	Brooklyn United	Won
2015	WorldFest Film Festival	Platinum Remi for Documentary	Brooklyn United	Won
2015	Cannes Short Corner	Short Corner Marketplace	Brooklyn United	
2015	Jecheon International Music & Film Festival (Jecheon, South Korea)	Official Selection	Brooklyn United	
2016	Laughlin International Film Festival	Matthew C. Martino Rising Star Award	Not Black Enough	Won
2016	WorldFest Houston	Remi Award For Documentaries (Bronze)	Jesse and the Fountain of Youth	Won
2016	Hollywood International Independent Film Festival	Documentaries	Not Black Enough	Won
2016	International Black Film Festival	Official Selection	Not Black Enough	
2016	Austin Revolution Film Festival	Documentary Feature	Not Black Enough	Won
2016	YOFI Film Festival	Official Selection	Not Black Enough	
2017	WOW Middle Eastern Film Festival (Dubai)	Best Documentary	Not Black Enough	Won
2017	Buffalo Niagara Film Festival	Best Documentary	Not Black Enough	Won
