= John Susman =

American dramatist

John Susman is an American playwright, screenwriter and a director/producer of film.

In the 1980s, he worked at Steppenwolf Theatre as literary manager, dramaturg, and assistant director on many Steppenwolf productions.

== Playwright ==
In 1990, his play Tiger Treadwell Takes Tinseltown was produced at the Ventura Court Theatre by the L.A. Theater Unit in Los Angeles. In 2003, his play Cafe Society was staged in Oak Park, Illinois at The Circle Theatre Chicago's New Plays Festival.

Susman's play Nelson and Simone, about the decades-long relationship between Nelson Algren and Simone de Beauvoir, is based on material Susman drew from de Beauvoir's 1998 book, A transatlantic love affair : letters to Nelson Algren. It had several staged readings, and was first produced in 1999 as a featured play at Prop Theatre's New Play Festival. It was produced again in 2000 at Chicago's Live Bait Theater directed by Richard Cotovsky starring Gary Houston and Rebecca Covey. The play dramatizes the love affair between Chicago literary giant Nelson Algren and French existentialist Simone de Beauvoir.

== Film ==
In 2007, he wrote, directed, and produced the comedy short Making the Man which has screened at over twenty film festivals in the US, Europe and Japan and had its commercial release on the DVD Best Of 16th Raindance Film Festival Shorts.

Susman's first feature-length motion picture Game Day, starring Romeo Miller and Lisa Zane with Chris J. Johnson and Fyvush Finkel, is scheduled for release in 2016. Original music by composer William Susman. John Susman is author of the original screen play and co-producer.

== Awards and honors ==
- Illinois Arts Council
- Illinois/Chicago Screenwriting Competition
- Nicholl Fellowship
- Uprising Playwright's Award
