= Uncle Nick =

- Theatrical release poster
- Directed by: Chris Kasick
- Written by: Mike Demski
- Produced by: Rebecca Hamm; Chris Kasick; Leslie Lucey; Brian Posehn
- Starring: Brian Posehn; Paget Brewster; Missi Pyle; Scott Adsit; Beau Ballinger; Melia Renee
- Cinematography: Michael Pescasio
- Edited by: Kimberley Hassett
- Music by: P. Andrew Willis
- Production company: Chris Kasick Company
- Distributed by: Dark Sky Films
- Release date: December 4, 2015
- Running time: 81 minutes
- Country: United States
- Language: English

Uncle Nick is a 2015 American comedy film directed by Chris Kasick, written by Mike Demski, and starring Brian Posehn, Paget Brewster, Missi Pyle, Scott Adsit, Beau Ballinger and Melia Renee. The film features Posehn as the titular character, a drunkard who goes to his annual Christmas family reunion where hijinks ensues.

It was released on December 4, 2015, by Dark Sky Films.

== Plot ==
Nick Wilkins is a lazy and lewd drunkard based in Cleveland who has to care for his elderly mother and manage the family landscaping business with his mistreated employee Luis. Although his mother is unable to go for health reasons, he plans to go to his family's annual Christmas gathering which would take place in the lavish home of his arrogant younger brother Cody. Cody lives with his older wife Sophie, an affluent but uptight pharmaceutical sales rep, and stepchildren Valerie, an aspiring model and college student, and Marcus, a gaming addict. Despite his contempt for Cody, Nick decides to go in hopes of hooking up with Valerie, with whom he has been exchanging messages and shares a mutual attraction with.

Nick's drinking and smoking irritates Cody and Sophie upon his arrival, and Sophie makes him do his smoking at Cody's studio where he designs t-shirts. The rebellious Valerie joins Nick in covertly smoking and drinking at the studio where they flirt. Nick later has a lively conversation with Marcus where they share their dislike of Cody and share their outlooks on life. Nick's fantasies about Valerie are often clouded by memories of his former girlfriend, Emily. When Nick and Valerie flirt again, Nick spots that she has been sexting someone, and when he brings it up to her, she encourages him to send her a dick pic.

Nick goes to the bathroom to take his dick pic, but he is unable to send it due to weak internet. Nick's attractive but equally bad-mannered younger sister Michelle arrives with her supportive husband Kevin, who runs a baseball podcast about the Cleveland Indians. Nick, Michelle, Kevin, and Valerie enjoy rowdy karaoke and Marcus barfs after trying eggnog, much to the consternation of Sophie. The family dinner is tense and awkward, made worse after Nick is forced to talk about how Emily suddenly died by aneurysm by his side in Christmas Eve. Sophie visits Nick in the studio to comfort him.

After badly losing a game of white elephant, the tipsy Nick unloads his stresses towards Cody and Sophie. Michelle brings Nick to the studio where he impulsively asks her his chances with Valerie. Michelle chastises her brother for pursuing the much-younger Valerie and tells him to sober up before he does something he would regret. Nick decides to retreat to his car, where Valerie joins him. She decides to seduce her uncle now that they are alone, but Nick, heeding his sister's words, rejects her advances. He goes back inside and stays at the studio. Distressed, Nick calls Luis, who denies Nick's pleas to join him and quits after confessing that he is fed up with him being a bad boss.

However, before he is able to sleep, he overhears Cody and Valerie having sex in the studio. Nick deduces that Cody was the one Valerie has been sexting and he is having a long-term affair with his own stepdaughter. After acting coldly towards Cody and Valerie, Nick baits both of them into exposing the affair to the family, much to the horror of Sophie. Valerie flees in shame and Cody beats Nick into unconsciousness. Marcus gets Cody off Nick and beats up Cody before Michelle and Kevin pull him away.

Nick wakes up in Christmas morning with only Sophie remaining at the house. Michelle and Kevin had left, Cody has been kicked out and is staying at a hotel, and Valerie and Marcus are staying with their father's. Nick apologizes for his behavior the day before, while Sophie admits that she left her previous husband for Cody out of fear of aging. Alone together, the two bond by the piano.

In the aftermath, Michelle and Kevin reminisce the Wilkins' old family photos; a traumatized Valerie rejects Cody's texts; and Luis re-joins the Wilkins landscaping business with Marcus as a new hire. Nick decides to join Kevin's podcast and talk about the Ten Cent Beer Night, with his anecdotes interspersed throughout the film. Nick reveals his parents had their first kiss at the game, and after they married months later, they had Nick as their firstborn child.

== Cast ==
- Brian Posehn as Uncle Nick
- Paget Brewster as Sophie
- Missi Pyle as Michelle
- Scott Adsit as Kevin
- Beau Ballinger as Cody
- Melia Renee as Valerie
- Jacob Houston as Marcus
- Joe Nunez as Luis
- Annie Savage as Emily

== Release ==
The film was released on December 4, 2015, by Dark Sky Films.
