= Bath Salt Zombies =

- Directed by: Dustin Mills
- Written by: Dustin Mills; Clint Weiler
- Produced by: Clint Weiler
- Starring: Josh Eal; Ethan Holey; Jackie McKown; Dave Parker; Brandon Salkil
- Edited by: Dustin Mills
- Release date: February 19, 2013
- Running time: 70 minutes
- Country: United States
- Language: English
- Budget: $5,000

Bath Salt Zombies is a 2013 American horror comedy directed by Dustin Mills, written by Mills and Clint Weller, and starring Josh Eal, Ethan Holey, Jackie McKown, Dave Parker, and Brandon Salkil. It is about zombie attacks brought on by concentrated bath salts.

== Plot ==
After a crackdown on the production of bath salts in the Midwest, the underground drug producers move to the Northeast and begin dumping newer, concentrated versions in New York City. The drugs turn out to have unforeseen consequences, and the addicts turn into violent cannibals. Agent Forster, a DEA agent, attempts to control the spread of the drugs and counter the wave of violence that follows.

== Cast ==
- Josh Eal as Agent Forster
- Ethan Holey as Bubbles
- Jackie McKown as Rita
- Dave Parker as The Chet
- Brandon Salkil as Ritchie

== Release ==
Bath Salt Zombies was released on video on February 19, 2013.

== Reception ==
In a positive review, Rod Lott of the Oklahoma Gazette said that cult film enthusiasts will appreciate Bath Salt Zombies, but the film's premise is stretched a bit thin at feature length. Olie Coen of DVD Talk rated the film 2.5/5 stars and called it "a B-movie from hell, but one that somehow comes across as funny and watchable, if barely." Mark L. Miller of AICN wrote that Mills "make[s] every minute of this film fun despite its low budget." Craig Gilbert of Verbicide wrote, "Even with the obvious apartment-as-sets moments, seemingly mandatory boob shots, and lower-rent appearance, the whole movie comes off as having a much higher budget and the whole package works really well." Patrick McMahon of SF Crowsnest said that it is a disappointing film with an interesting concept that focuses too much on gore. Lee Jutton said that the film will appeal to cult horror fans who prefer splatter films.
