= San Diego Latino Film Festival =

Film festival in San Diego, California

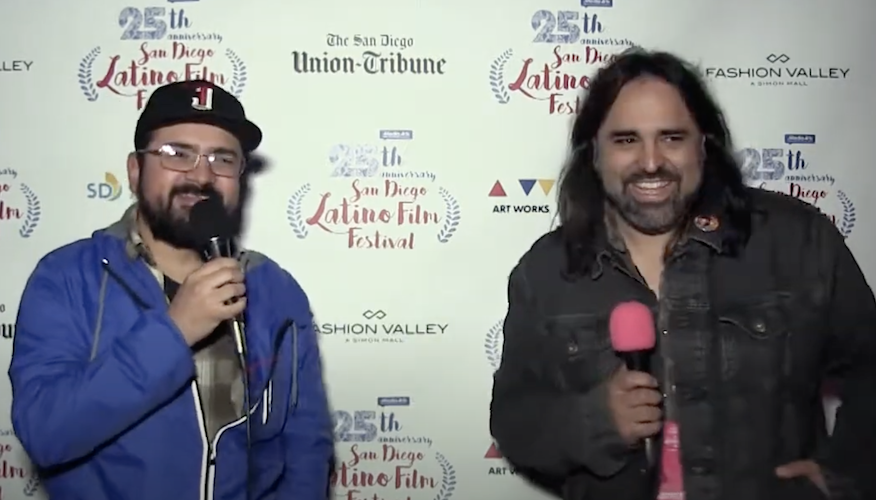
- Mickey J. Brijandez and Miguel Rodriguez at SDLFF in 2018
- Location: Digital Gym Cinema; UltraStar Mission Valley Cinemas; AMC Theatres at Westfield Mission Valley
- Established: 1993
- Founded by: Ethan van Thillo
- Most recent: 2023
- Website: https://sdlatinofilm.com/

The San Diego Latino Film Festival (SDLFF) is an annual film festival held in San Diego, California. It was founded in 1993.

== History ==
The festival helped pave the way for diverse groups and cultures in the film industry. Ethan van Thillo founded the festival in 1993. In 2000, they received over 5,000 attendees and in 2002, van Thillo said the festival really came together with help from participants and media outlets that visit from Tijuana. In 2007, the Arte Latino exhibit was included at the festival's screenings.

Each year, a competition is held with different posters to decide which one will represent the festival. By 2011, the Premio Corazon Award was designed by Lizet Benrey and the festival's 12th annual Cinema En Tu Idioma, a series of films, had a one week run at Ultrastar Mission Valley Cinemas near Hazard Center station. In 2023, the 30th anniversary festival took place at AMC Theatres at Westfield Mission Valley and Digital Gym Cinema.

=== Notable films ===
- Amores perros
- Backyard
- Brava Gente Brasileira
- Chevolution
- Cosas insignificantes
- Eisenstein in Guanajuato
- Food Chains
- La calle de la amargura
- La ciénaga
- La Mission
- Mi Vida Loca
- Nora's Will
- Our Barrio
- Puerto Ricans in Paris
- Regresa
- Sólo quiero caminar
- The Blue Diner
- The Kid: Chamaco
- Y tu mamá también

=== Notable attendees ===
- Alfonso Cuarón
- America Ferrera
- Arturo Ripstein
- Barbara Mori
- Diego Luna
- Dolores Huerta
- Edward James Olmos
- Evelina Fernandez
- Gael Garcia Bernal
- Gregory Nava
- Jacob Vargas
- Jaime Camil
- Jaime Gomez
- Joaquín Cosío
- Lourdes Portillo
- Luis Mandoki
- Lucia Murat
- Luis Valdez
- Maureen Gosling
- Moctesuma Esparza
- Patssi Valdez
- Paul Rodriguez
- Ray Bradbury
- Seidy Lopez
