= Farkhondeh Torabi =

Iranian animated film director (born 1965)

- فرخنده ترابی

Farkhondeh Torabi (born March, 1965 in Tehran, Iran) is an internationally acclaimed Persian animation director.

== Career ==
She studied psychology at the Alzahra University in Tehran in the mid-1980s. In 1988, she joined IIDCYA (Kanoon) and learned theory and practice of animation under the supervision of Vajihollah Fard-Moghaddam. Torabi was the assistant director of Vajihollah Fard-Moghaddam's film Lili Hosak. which won several international awards.

She started making short animations herself in 1991. She has made several short films of animation since then which most of which have won international awards. Her most notable film to date has been Shangoul and Mangoul (2000). This animation has presented at the festivals including: Cannes Junior, international Festival of cartoon film of Annecy, Cineanima - Festival of cartoon film of Espinho (Portugal), Festival of film of Cairo (Egypt), Festival of film for children of Chicago (the USA), International Festival of Leipzig (Germany), and International Festival of film of Vancouver (Canada).

== Filmography ==
- Flight (Parvaz, 1993)
- Health Brings Joy (Salamati May-e-Neshat Ast, 1994)
- The Thirsty Crow (Kalagh-e-Teshne, 1996)
- The Rainbow Fish (Mahi-e-Rangin Kaman, 1998)
- Shangoul and Mangoul (2000)
- The Sprout (Rishe, 2005)

== Awards and honors ==
Farkhondeh Torabi has won numerous awards for her animated film Shangoul and Mangoul, some of which include:

- Plaque of Merit, The International Animated Film Festival of Annecy, 2000, France,
- Certificate of merit (adult jury prize), Chicago International Children's Film Festival, 2000,
- Silver Poznan goats for best animated film, international competition, Ale Kino young audience film festival Poznan, Poland, 2001,
- Golden Cairo for the best animation, Cairo international film festival for children, 2001
- Best Asian film, Pusan International Film Festival, Korea, 2001,
- Silver Elephant award for the best animated film, international children's film festival, Hyderabad, India, 2001,
- Tadgell's BlueBell honor award ( best film or video made by adults about or for children), Auburn international film and video festival for children and young adults, Australia, 2001
- Golden Butterfly and two Certificates of Merit and Appreciation from 15th Isfahan film festival for children and young adults
- Three Crystal Birds from 2nd Tehran international animation festival, Iran,
- Mention speciale du jury festival du film d’animation, pour la jeunesse, France,
- Award of best short animation film from golden Palmetto international film festival
- Award of best film from 15th Zagreb international film festival
- Award of best short film from 5th Sousse international film festival for childhood and youth, Tunisia,
- Award of best film from visamburg international film festival
- Bronze prize from 34th WorldFast international film festival, Houston, 2001
- Best Asian film, pizaf international film festival,
- Special award for new technique from 15th burganberes international film festival,
- Young Cinema, 2000, Tehran, Special Prize of the Handicraft's Organization, elected by ASIFA,
- Rencontres Internationales du Cinéma d'Animation de Wissembourg, 2001, France, Grand Prize (Children's Jury Prize)
- Zagreb, 2002, Croatia, Best Films Prize

== See also ==
- Intellectual Movements in Iran
- Persian cinema
