= Roger Guy English =

American businessman

- Born: Roger Guy English; 1950 (age 75–76); Orange, California, U.S.
- Other name: Teenangel
- Education: La Jolla High School; San Diego Mesa College; University of California, San Diego
- Occupations: Businessman; disc jockey; film critic
- Known for: Guinness World Records; Full Tilt Boogie, Daddy-O
- Notable credit: Hemet, or the Landlady Don't Drink Tea
- Height: 1.88 m (6 ft 2 in)
- Relatives: Valerie Mayers (cousin)

Roger Guy English, also known as Teenangel, is an American businessman, disc jockey and film critic who achieved seven Guinness World Records in San Diego County in under a three year period during the 1970s. The documentary Full Tilt Boogie, Daddy-O (2025) is a biography about his life.

== Early life ==
English was born in 1950 in Orange, California. He attempted a major in cinematography at San Diego Mesa College and was a literary student at University of California, San Diego, but dropped out. He wrote two books, which he was unable to sell.

== World records ==
In 1970, English walked from his home in La Jolla, California, to Vancouver, Canada, with his cousin, Valerie Mayers, in hopes of spreading awareness about environmental pollution and smog. Upon returning home, crowds deemed him a local celebrity. English was tipped to do a publicity stunt to help build his popularity. This started his desire to attempt setting world records such as throwing 200 bottles with messages into the ocean and living in a car on a dealer's lot for a month.

English set his first four world records in under a year, from July 1973 to April 1974. After flipping through a book of Guinness World Records, he decided to do the Twist. English set the Twist record at 102 hours, 28 minutes and 37 seconds which began on July 11 and continued through July 16th in La Jolla. He set the record for water treading for 18 hours, 28 minutes and 37 seconds in a La Jolla pool. He set another record by kissing 3,000 women in 8 hours.

In 1974, English set the record for sleeplessness after a waterbed shop on University Avenue wanted to play part in his attempts by allowing him to do it in their front window. Starting at 10:30am on March 20, he did not sleep for 12 days, 5 hours and 15 minutes. To pass the time, English drank coffee, smoked cigarettes and played Monopoly with friends. When he finally slept at 10:30am on April 1, he was out for 26 hours. Because of health and safety concerns, Guinness discontinued the category after that. Though Don Learned reported in 1979 that English's record was broken when someone set a new wake record of over 18 days.

English later proposed the idea that he would like to swim the English Channel. English attempted to swim the length of the Mississippi River in August, but was held up because of weather and damage to a camper and rowboat. On December 27, English set a joke telling record over 5 hours and 15 minutes at Winner's Circle Lodge in Del Mar.

In 1975, English played Pong for seven days in a Mission Valley trailer. By 1979, English's record for the Twist was the only record that remained unbroken.

== Later life and career ==
In 1975, English started his own store, a nostalgic American Graffiti shop in Pacific Beach. He expressed his desire to be an actor in 1979, saying "everything I did I did for publicity." He became a film critic and made a microbudget thriller film about lifeguards called Victims, inspired by Federico Fellini and Alfred Hitchcock. In 1989, English was a disc jockey in San Diego. He later moved to Poway, California.

== Legacy ==
In 2022, Thorn Brewing Company named a beer after English called Full Tilt Boogie Hefeweizen. In 2021, filmmaker Tyler J. French recorded over 60 hours of footage of English for a documentary about him called Full Tilt Boogie, Daddy-O. The film was submitted to Sundance Film Festival.

== Filmography ==
Year.	Title	Role	Notes
1970s	Victims		Release unknown
2023	Hemet, or the Landlady Don't Drink Tea	Saltie	
2025	Full Tilt Boogie, Daddy-O	Himself	
