= Shangoul and Mangoul =

Shangoul And Mangoul
- Directed by: Farkhondeh Torabi; Merteza Ahadi
- Release date: October 14, 2000
- Running time: 18 min.
- Country: Iran

Shangoul And Mangoul (Persian: Shangoul O Mangoul) is a 2000 Iranian animated film directed by Farkhondeh Torabi and Merteza Ahadi. Its runtime is 18 minutes and it is based on a Persian folktale.

The Big Bad Wolf takes advantage of the mother goat being out. But the kids defend themselves.

== Awards ==
In 2000 the film won the Adult's Jury Award - Certificate of Merit for Short Film/Video - Animation at the Chicago International Children's Film Festival and in 2001 it won the Silver Poznan Goat for Best Animation Film at the Ale Kino! - International Young Audience Film Festival (Poland).
