= Joe Nunez =

American actor

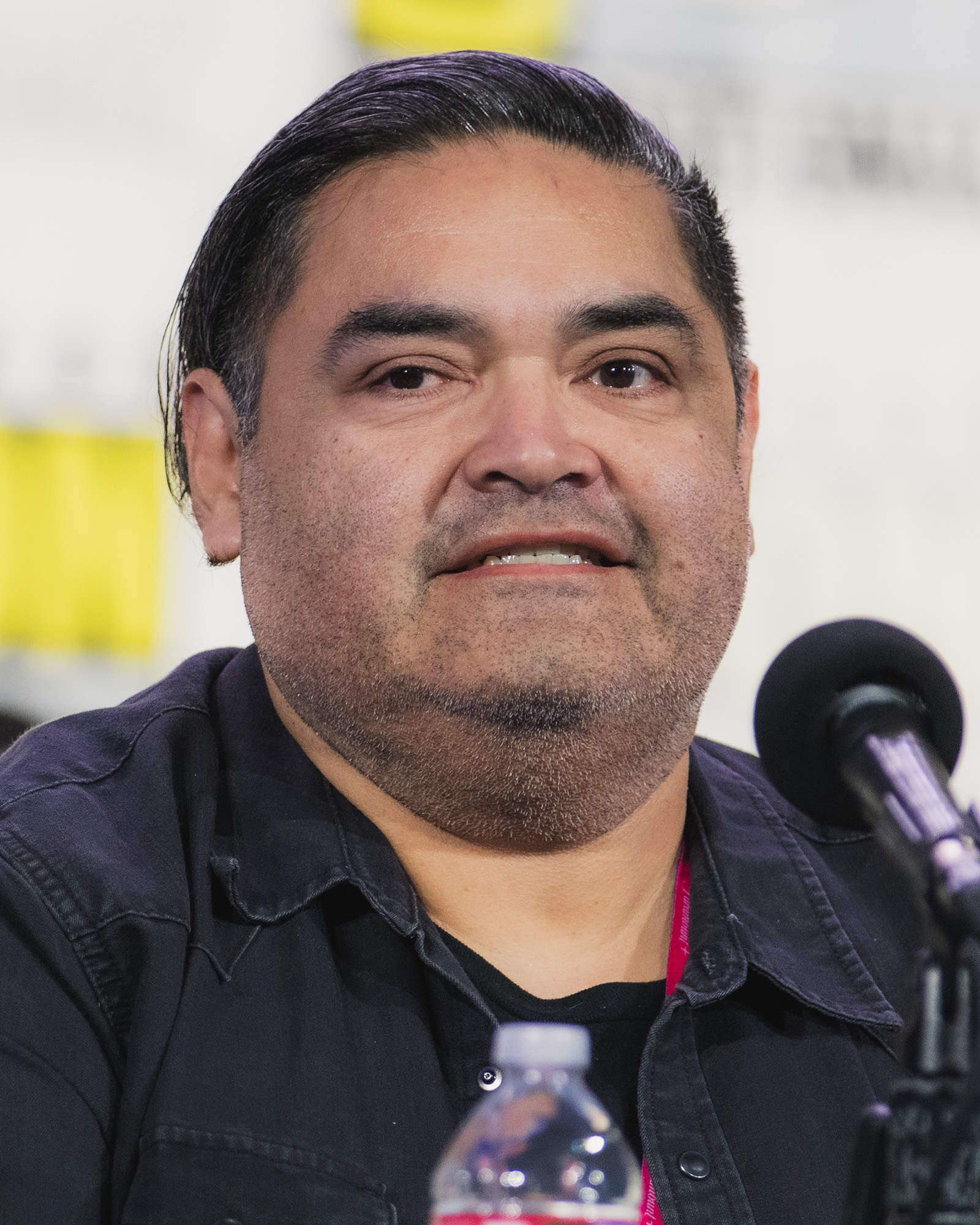
- Nuñez in 2026
- Born: Joseph A. Nunez
- Other name: Joseph Nunez
- Education: Creighton University
- Occupations: Actor; comedian
- Years active: 1999–present
- Known for: Rango; The Watch; Superbad
- Notable credits: Bridesmaids; Uncle Nick
- Television: Bless This Mess; Elena of Avalor; Prison Break

Joseph A. Nuñez is an American actor and comedian known for his roles on the series Bless This Mess (2019), Elena of Avalor (2016), Prison Break (2005), and in the films Rango (2011), The Watch (2012), and Superbad (2007).

== Early life ==
Nunez was born to a Mexican family (who are of Michoacan and Zacatecan) and did not learn English until the age of four. He found an interest in comedy when he was 12 and graduated from Creighton University with a Theater and English degree.

== Career ==
Nunez worked the comedy scene at ImprovOlympic and Second City with Horatio Sanz in Chicago before moving to Los Angeles in 2001 to pursue an acting career.

He was cast as Manche Sanchez in Prison Break and had in minor roles in the films The 40-Year-Old Virgin, The Pursuit of Happyness, and Bridesmaids. In 2010, Nunez played the role of Migo Salazar in the pilot for the FOX sitcom Running Wilde, but the role was recast after the pilot episode.

Nunez was later cast as Antonio Guzman in The Watch, Armando Gutierrez in Elena of Avalor, and Ray in Bless This Mess.

In 2026, Nunez made his directorial debut with Concert Heroes starring Chris Kattan.

== Filmography ==
Year	Title	Role	Notes
2003	Melvin Goes to Dinner	Extra	
2005	Domino	Raul Chavez	
2005	The 40-Year-Old Virgin	Man Buffing Floor	
2006	Let's Go to Prison	Prisoner in Bathroom	
2006	The Pursuit of Happiness	Driver Who Hits Chris	
2006	School for Scoundrels	Classmate	
2006–2007	Prison Break	Manche Sanchez	9 episodes
2007	Superbad	Liquor Store Clerk	
2008	Seven Pounds	Larry / Hotel Owner	
2010	In My Sleep	Mr. Mather	
2010	Running Wilde	Migo Salazar	Pilot
2011	Rango	Rock-Eye	Voice
2011	Bridesmaids	Oscar the Security Guard	
2012	Free Samples	Yani Perez	
2012	The Watch	Antonio Guzman	
2014	Search Party	Miguel	
2014	The Winklers	Paco	
2015	Uncle Nick	Luis	
2016–2020	Elena of Avalor	Armando Gutierrez	31 episodes
2018	The Rake	Jeremy	
2019–2020	Bless This Mess	Ray	9 episodes
TBA	Concert Heroes		Directorial debut
