= Randy Davison =

American actor

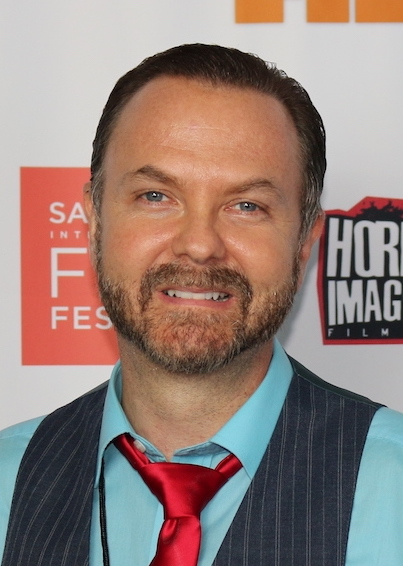
- Davison in 2017
- Born: Randy Lee Davison; May 17, 1971 (age 55); Boise, Idaho, U.S.
- Education: Capital High School; Boise State University
- Occupation: Actor
- Years active: 1992–present
- Known for: Hemet, or the Landlady Don't Drink Tea; Mank; Montross: Blood Rules; The United States vs. Billie Holiday
- Notable credits: Proximity; Pulp Friction; Not This Part of the World; Touch
- Television: America's Funniest People

Randy Lee Davison (born May 17, 1971) is an American actor who appeared in the films The United States vs. Billie Holiday (2021) as Joseph McCarthy, Mank (2020), Hemet, or the Landlady Don't Drink Tea (2023), Not This Part of the World (1995), and Touch (2022). In the 1990s, Davison appeared in the television show America's Funniest People as Edith Bunker and as Senex in Boise State University's production of A Funny Thing Happened on the Way to the Forum.

== Early life ==
Davison graduated from Capital High School and is a theatre major out of Boise State University. In 1992, Davison appeared on America's Funniest People as Edith Bunker and as Popeye being Elvis. The following year, he participated in the Irene Ryan Acting competition at the Kennedy Center American College Theatre Festival regional conference for his monologue in the play The Four Bagger. In 1994, Davison starred as Phil in Boys' Life at BSU, tied for top honors at the Student Programs Board's stand-up comedy competition Just Another One Night Stand.

== Career ==
Davison's journey into acting was inspired during his grade school years when he saw a boy playing a bear in the youth production of The Jungle Book and catching a performance of The Tempest in 7th grade.

Early in his career, Davison co-starred in the film Not This Part of the World. Before joining SAG-AFTRA, his work experience came from being an extra on movies sets and doing voice-over projects. Davison relocated to San Diego after booking a commercial for Southwest Airlines. His acting career set him up with work at UC San Diego School of Medicine. Davison co-starred with Jayma Mays in a production of The Ruling Class at The Knightsbridge Theatre in Los Angeles, California.

In 2017, he contributed his voice to Uncharted Regions, a radio drama by Neal Hallford featuring Gigi Edgely, John Billingsley and Larry Nemeck. Davison worked on a film called Carbon in 2018, shot in San Diego. In the 2020s, he portrayed the maitre d' of the Cafe Trocadero in Mank, Joseph McCarthy in The United States vs. Billie Holiday, a sheriff in Hemet, or the Landlady Don't Drink Tea, and acted in Touch. Davison was one of the last people photographed with Tom Sizemore before his death in 2023. He was nominated at the Pacific Southwest Emmy Awards for hosting the 2024 San Diego Film Awards.

== Filmography ==
Feature films
Year	Title	Role	Ref.
1995	Not This Part of the World	Randy	
2011	River of Darkness	State Trooper	
2017	Daydream Hotel	Voltaire	
2019	Carbon	Daniel 'Zeke' Thomas	
2020	Proximity	Dr. Kozlov	
2020	Becoming Lola	Char	
2020	Mank	Maitre d'	
2020	Blood on Her Badge	Captain Grant	
2021	The United States vs. Billie Holiday	Joseph McCarthy	
2021	Angel Mountain	George	
2021	Simple Twist	Andrew Bridger	
2021	Mystery Highway	Paladin / Rich / Greyson	
2022	Top Gun: Maverick	Naval Aviator	
2022	Montross: Blood Rules	Frank Henderson	
2023	Ronald's Little Factory	Brother Wood	
2023	Hemet, or the Landlady Don't Drink Tea	Sheriff Hunting	
2024	Sincerely Saul	Carry the Counsellor	
TBA	Concert Heroes		

Short films
Year	Title	Role	Ref.
2020	Limbo	Hitman	
2021	Pulp Friction	Gary	
2021	Immortal Game	Peter	
2022	Touch	Victim	
2023	Just Married – Italian Style	Angelo	

Television
Year	Title	Role	Notes
1992	America's Funniest People	Edith Bunker / Popeye / Elvis	
2003	Scrubs	Urine Lab Technician	Episode: "My Journey"
2004	24	Agent Devereux	Episode: "Day 3: 8:00 a.m.-9:00 am"
2013	The Daily Show	Keith Meyer	Episode: "Phil Jackson"
2013	Unusual Suspects	Neal Bross	Episode: "The Last Resort"
2014	Masters of Sex	Wired Male	Episode: "Mirror, Mirror"
2016	Sex Sent Me to the ER	Dr. Phillips	Episode: "Three's a Crowd"
2016	Wynonna Earp	Revenant Biker	Episode: "Leavin' on Your Mind"

== Stage credits ==
Year	Title	Role	Location	Ref.
2016	Medea	Aegeus	Horton Grand Theatre, San Diego, California	
2016	It Had to Be You	Frank's Brain	Diversionary Theatre, San Diego, California	
2003	The Ruling Class	Tucker	Knightsbridge Theatre, Los Angeles, California	
1998	A Midsummer Night's Dream	Demetrius	Kings and Clowns, Torrance, California	
—N/a	The Two Gentlemen of Verona	Valentine	—N/a	
1997	The Winter's Tale	Polixienes	Stage II, Morrison Center, Boise State University	
1996	The Tempest	Francisco	Idaho Shakespeare Festival, Boise, Idaho	
1996	The Merry Wives of Windsor	John Rugby	Idaho Shakespeare Festival, Boise, Idaho	
1996	Twelfth Night	Feste	Idaho Shakespeare Festival, Boise, Idaho	
1996	Drop	Zip	Stage II, Morrison Center, Boise State University	
1996	Charlotte's Web	Templeton	Idaho Theater for Youth, Western States Tour	
1996	Talk Radio	Stu Noonan	Stage II, Morrison Center, Boise State University	
1995	Bodies and Minds Intertwine: Uncle Petey	Patrick Flannigan	Boise State University, Boise, Idaho	
1995	Bodies and Minds Intertwine: Still Life	Ensemble of Couples	Boise State University, Boise, Idaho	
1995	Bodies and Minds Intertwine: Cavemen	Ronald	Boise State University, Boise, Idaho	
1995	Bodies and Minds Intertwine: Bugbear	Dancer	Boise State University, Boise, Idaho	
1995	The Playboy of the Western World	Michael Flaherty	Stage II, Morrison Center, Boise State University	
1995	A Funny Thing Happened on the Way to the Forum	Senex	Boise State University, Boise, Idaho	
1994	...And It Shows: Death of a Princess	Max	Boise State University, Boise, Idaho	
1994	...And It Shows: Out West	Brother	Boise State University, Boise, Idaho	
1994	...And It Shows: A Lonely Impulse of Delight	Jim	Boise State University, Boise, Idaho	
1994	...And It Shows: The Leading Scorer	David	Boise State University, Boise, Idaho	
1994	Boys' Life	Phil	Stage II, Morrison Center, Boise State University	
1993	Pvt. Wars	Gately	Stage II, Morrison Center, Boise State University	
1993	Bus Stop	Carl	Boise State University, Boise, Idaho	
1993	The Four Bagger		Stage II, Morrison Center, Boise State University	
1992	The Human Comedy	Tobey	Stage II, Morrison Center, Boise State University	
1992	Les Liaisons Dangereuses	Le Chevalier Danceny	Boise State University, Boise, Idaho	
1992	Pal Joey	Mr. Swift	Special Events Center, Boise State University	
—N/a	Savage/Love	—N/a	Boise State University, Boise, Idaho	
