= Austin Revolution Film Festival =

Film festival

- Location: Austin, Texas, U.S.
- Established: 2011
- Founded by: James Christopher
- Most recent: 2023

Austin Revolution Film Festival (ARFF) is an annual film festival in Austin, Texas.

== History ==
James Christopher is the festival director and founder. Christopher said the festival is focused on indie filmmakers who are creative without large budgets. The festival made MovieMaker's "50 Film Festivals Worth the Entry Fee in 2018". That year the festival awarded Overwood, a script by Scott Cobb, as a semi-finalist. It was later revoked after Cobb complained about the festival being heartless, promoting gun violence by branding themselves with revolvers on their laurels.

In 2022, the festival held extended in person screenings of films from the 9th and 10th festival at the Crown Plaza Austin Hotel because of the COVID-19 pandemic.
