= Idyllwild International Festival of Cinema =

Film festival in Idyllwild, California

- Location: Idyllwild, California
- Founded: 2009
- Directors: Stephen Savage
- Producers: Trinity Houston
- Hosted by: Stephen Savage
- Festival date: First quarter of each year
- Language: English
- Website: www.idyllwildcinemafest.com

The Idyllwild International Festival of Cinema (IIFC) is an independent film festival held since 2009 in Idyllwild, California. The festival is run by its founder, director Stephen Savage.

The tenth annual IIFC was held March 5 through 10, 2019.

As of 2019, the Grand Jury was composed of Wolfgang Bodison, Irene Bedard, Kristoff St. John, Conor O'Farrell, Juan Ruiz Anchia, Erika Christensen, Anne Archer and Peter Szebadi.

IIFC's schedule overlaps with the much larger Palm Springs International Film Festival in Palm Springs. Savage has said scheduling the festival in January helps the local economy during the slow season.

The festival was the inspiration for the Glendale International Film Festival, which started in 2014.
