= Ray Gallardo =

American director and cinematographer

- Born: Raymund Gallardo
- Occupations: Cinematographer; film director; film editor; film producer; gaffer; electrician; writer
- Years active: 2004–present
- Known for: At the Frontera; Callejero; Friend of the World; Touch
- Notable credits: A Rodeo Film; The Fifth of November; Pulp Friction
- Website: infdv.com

Raymund Gallardo is an American filmmaker who directed the films Above the Tin (2018), At the Frontera (2018), Callejero (2015), and Entrenched: Prologue (2019). He was the cinematographer for the films Friend of the World (2020), The Fifth of November (2018) and Touch (2022).

== Career ==
=== Direction ===
In 2015, Gallardo's film Callejero, an underground fighting drama film featuring Carlos Palomino, Jossara Jinaro, and Yaqui López, screened at the San Diego Latino Film Festival. His next film Cafe Con Leche, also known as At the Frontera, starred Gerardo Teracena and Nina Senicar. It was listed in the product guide for Screen International at Toronto International Film Festival in 2017 and premiered at ArcLight Hollywood in 2018.

Gallardo directed Above the Tin, a 2018 film made in San Diego about squash among underprivileged teens. In 2019, he directed Entrenched: Prologue, a PTSD awareness film that premiered at San Diego International Film Festival and was nominated for Best Art Design at Oceanside International Film Festival. Gallardo's production company Infrastructure Productions has assisted with short advertisements for Horrible Imaginings Film Festival.

==== At the Frontera ====
At the Frontera, also known as Café Con Leche, is a 2019 action crime thriller film written by Wesley Adkins, Ray Gallardo, Martin Santander and directed by Gallardo. Principal photography took place in February 2015 in Mexico City and Houston. The film language is entirely in English for international marketing purposes. Actress Mónica Sánchez Navarro acted with both of her daughters in the film. Marie Adler says the film is "timely and relevant" due to the Latin American immigration laws. In an interview, Santander talked about writing the female characters in the script "strong and independent." The film was listed in the product guide for Screen International at Toronto International Film Festival in 2017 before holding its world premiere on January 25, 2018, at ArcLight Hollywood. It had a limited theatrical run in Los Angeles on January 31, 2019, and the following week in Charlotte, North Carolina.

=== Cinematography ===
In 2019, Gallardo was the cinematographer for Buy Roses for Me with Jon Allen and The Fifth of November starring Qurrat Ann Kadwani. The following year, he handled the cinematography for Friend of the World starring Nick Young and Alexandra Slade. Film critics praised his lensing and use of lighting. Director Brian Patrick Butler said Gallardo's use of lighting was crucial for classic black and white photography. In 2022, he worked as the cinematographer for Touch starring Eva Ceja and Randy Davison.

== Filmography ==
Feature films
| Year | Title | Cinematographer | Director | Writer | Notes |
|---|---|---|---|---|---|
| 2015 | Callejero | No | Yes | Co-writer | Featuring Carlos Palomino, Jossara Jinaro, and Yaqui López |
| 2018 | At the Frontera | No | Yes | Yes | Featuring Gerardo Taracena, Nina Senicar, Mónica Sánchez Navarro, Cassandra Sánchez Navarro, Sofia Rivera Torres |
| 2018 | Above the Tin | No | Yes | No | Documentary, also editor |
| 2020 | Friend of the World | Yes | No | No | |
| 2026 | Monochromatic † | Yes | No | No | San Diego Latino Film Festival premiere |
| TBA | A Corpse in Kensington † | Yes | No | No | |
| TBA | Fall of Giselle † | No | No | No | Gaffer |
| TBA | The Ender Home † | Yes | No | No | |

Key
| † | Denotes films that have not yet been released |

Short films
| Year | Title | Cinematographer | Notes |
|---|---|---|---|
| 2004 | Cookie | No | Director |
| 2012 | Office Freakout | Yes | Also editor |
| 2012 | The Take Back | Yes | Also director and producer, featuring Jon Allen |
| 2013 | Movie Date | Yes | Also editor, featuring Page Kennedy |
| 2016 | A Quintmas Carol | Yes | |
| 2017 | John's Big Day | Yes | Written and directed by Ryan Binse |
| 2018 | The Fifth of November | Yes | |
| 2019 | A Rodeo Film | No | Electrician |
| 2019 | Buy Roses for Me | Yes | Featuring Aimee La Joie, Luke Pensabene, Brian Patrick Butler |
| 2019 | Entrenched: Prologue | No | Director, featuring Ron Christopher Jones |
| 2021 | Pulp Friction | No | Gaffer |
| 2022 | Touch | Yes | |
| 2023 | Like Honey | Yes | |
| 2023 | Broken Mirrors | Yes | |
| 2025 | The Truth About Susie | Yes | Featuring Beth Gallagher, Steve Froehlich, Randy Davison |

Series
| Year | Title | Editor | Camera operator | Cinematographer | Notes |
|---|---|---|---|---|---|
| 2006 | World Series of Poker | Yes | No | Yes | |
| 2014 | Battle Hero Absolute | No | Yes | No | 1 episode |
| 2015 | Dalek Gary | No | No | Yes | |
| 2021 | Recruiters: Mission First | Yes | No | No | 9 episodes |
| 2022 | NonCommissioned News | Yes | No | Yes | |
| 2023 | Fire for Effect with Rapid Fire Comedy Tour | Yes | No | No | |
| 2023 | Uncanceled: Mandatory Fun Comedy Special | Yes | Yes | No | 6 episodes |
| 2023 | Don't Ask, Don't Tell | Yes | Yes | No | 9 episodes |
| 2023 | Busted Down | Yes | Yes | No | 5 episodes |
| 2024 | The Military Leeks | Yes | Yes | No | |
| 2024 | Operation Heal*arious Season 1 Finale Special | Yes | Yes | No | |
| 2024 | Defining Moments | Yes | No | Yes | |
| 2025 | The Boy I Hate | No | No | No | G&E |
| 2025 | I Am Bloody Mary | No | No | No | G&E |
| TBA | Sagebrush Hollow: The Cowboy Billionaire Returns | Yes | No | Yes | also co-director |
