= Royal Academy of Dramatic Art =

Drama school in London, England

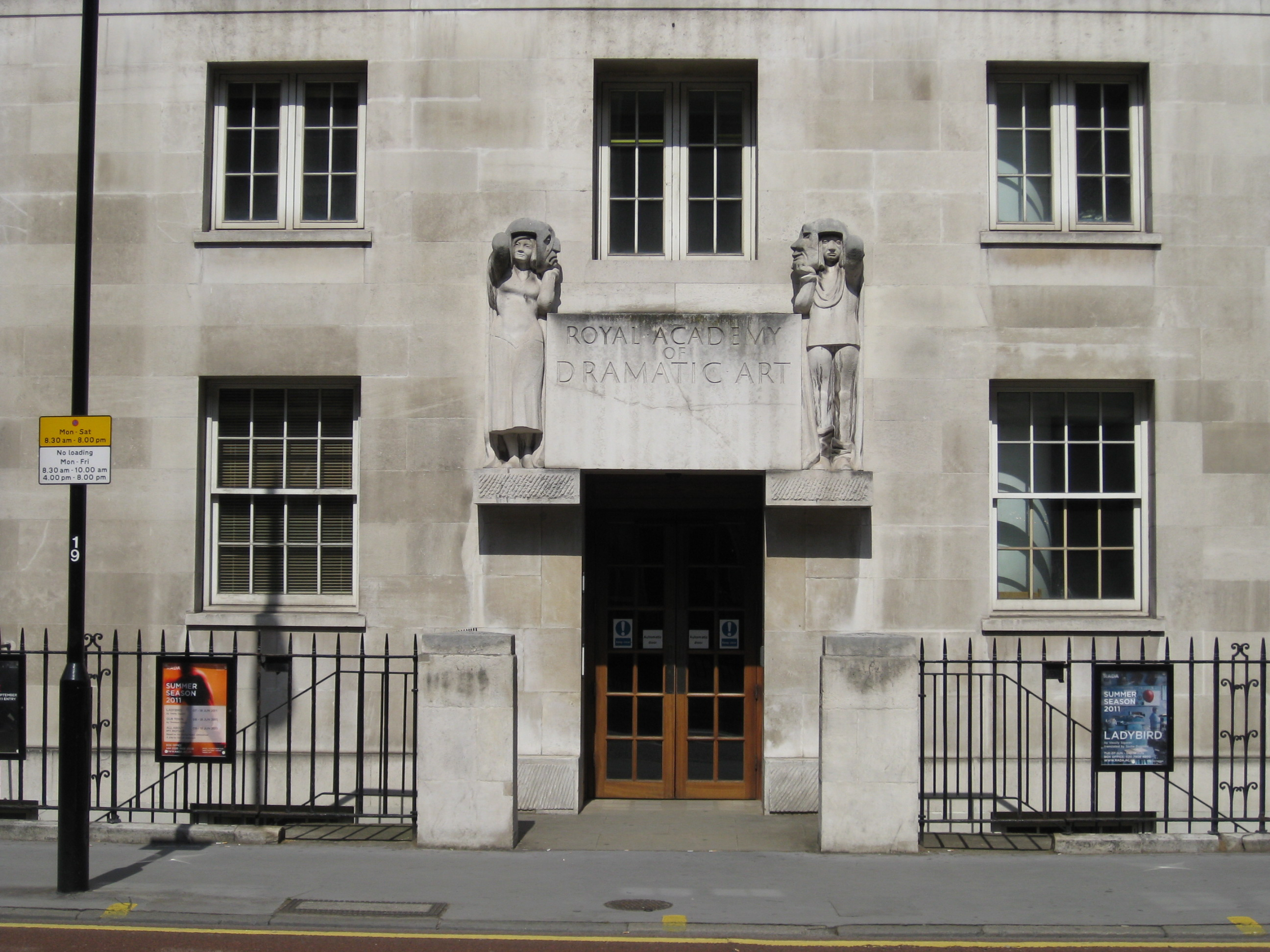
- Main entrance on Gower Street, London
- Other name: RADA
- Type: Drama school
- Established: 25 April 1904; 122 years ago
- Affiliations: Federation of Drama Schools; King's College London; Birkbeck, University of London; The Lir Academy
- Chairman: Marcus Ryder
- President: David Harewood
- Vice-president: Cynthia Erivo
- Principal: Helen Slater
- Royal Patron: King Charles III
- Location: London, England, UK; 51.5218°N 0.1314°W
- Website: rada.ac.uk

The Royal Academy of Dramatic Art (RADA; /ˈrɑːdə/) is a drama school in London, England, which provides vocational conservatoire training for theatre, film, television, and radio. It is based in Bloomsbury, Central London, close to the Senate House complex of the University of London, and is a founding member of the Federation of Drama Schools.

RADA is one of the oldest drama schools in the United Kingdom, founded in 1904 by Sir Herbert Beerbohm Tree. It moved to buildings on Gower Street in 1905. It was granted a royal charter in 1920 and a new theatre was built on Malet Street, behind the Gower Street buildings, which was opened in 1921 by Edward, Prince of Wales. It received its first government subsidy in 1924. RADA currently has five theatres and a cinema. The school's principal industry partner is Warner Bros. Entertainment.

RADA offers a number of foundation, undergraduate and postgraduate courses. Its higher education awards are validated by King's College London (KCL). The royal patron of the school is King Charles III, following the death of Queen Elizabeth II in 2022. The president is David Harewood, who succeeded Sir Kenneth Branagh in February 2024, with Cynthia Erivo appointed vice president. The chairman is Marcus Ryder, who succeeded Sir Stephen Waley-Cohen in 2021. Its vice-chairman was Alan Rickman until his death in 2016. The current principal of the academy is Helen Slater, who succeeded Niamh Dowling in 2026.

== History ==
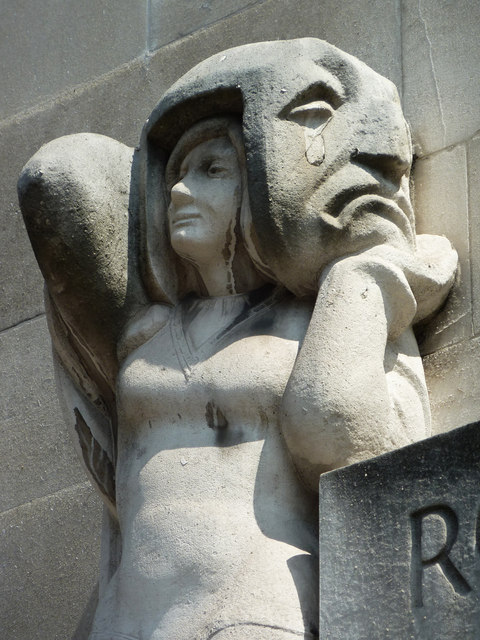
The sculpture above the entrance to RADA features masks which depict Tragedy (pictured) and Comedy (which appears opposite). A symbol of theatre, they are also known as Sock and Buskin.

The Academy of Dramatic Art was founded on 25 April 1904 by actor-manager Sir Herbert Beerbohm Tree (the grandfather of actor Oliver Reed) at the West End's Her Majesty's Theatre (now His Majesty's) situated in Haymarket in the City of Westminster, London. In 1905, the Academy moved to 62 Gower Street, and a managing council was set up to oversee the school. Its first president was Sir Squire Bancroft, and its members included George Bernard Shaw, who later donated his royalties from his play Pygmalion to RADA and gave lectures to students at the school.

In 1920, the Academy was granted a royal charter, becoming the Royal Academy of Dramatic Art. In 1921, a new theatre was built on Malet Street behind the Gower Street buildings. Edward, Prince of Wales, opened the theatre. In 1923, Sir John Gielgud studied at RADA for a year. He later became president of the academy and its first honorary fellow. In 1924, RADA received its first government subsidy, a grant of £500. The Gower Street buildings were torn down in 1927 and replaced with a new building, financed by Bernard Shaw, who also left one-third of his royalties to the academy on his death in 1950. The academy has received other government funding at various times, including a £22.7 million grant from the Arts Council National Lottery Board in 1996, which was used to renovate its premises and rebuild the Jerwood Vanbrugh Theatre.

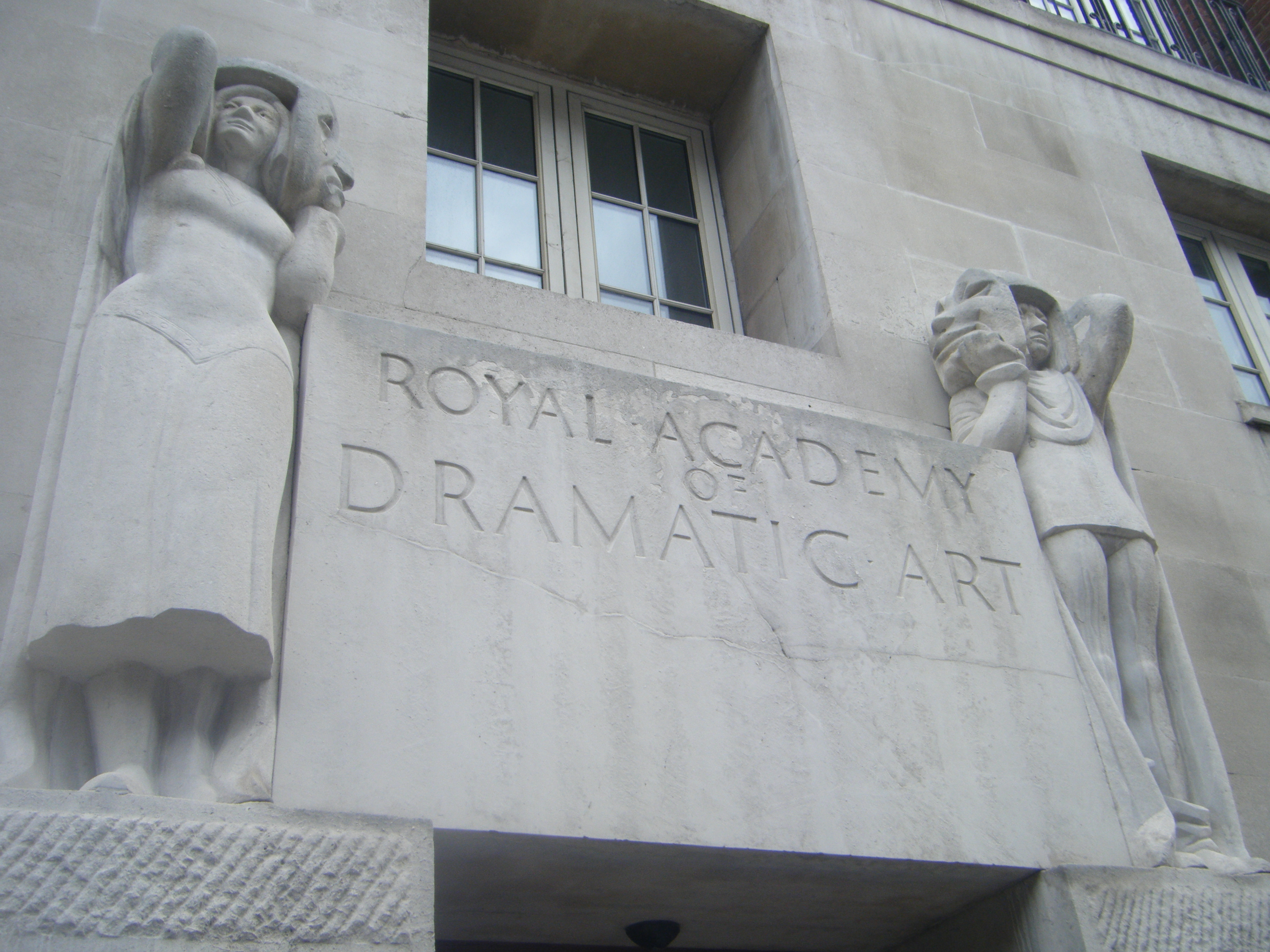
RADA entrance sign

In 2000, the academy founded RADA Enterprises Ltd, now known as RADA Business, providing training programmes and coaching for organisations and individuals in communications and team building which use drama training techniques in a business context. The profits are fed back into the academy to help cover its costs. In 2001, RADA joined with the London Contemporary Dance School to create the UK's first Conservatoire for Dance and Drama (CDD). RADA left the CDD in August 2019 to become an independent higher education provider. RADA is also a founder member of the Federation of Drama Schools, established in 2017.

In 2004, celebrity photographer Cambridge Jones was commissioned to create a body of work published as a book, Off Stage: 100 Portraits Celebrating the RADA Centenary, in 2005 to celebrate RADA's centenary. The photographs include John Hurt, Alan Rickman, Sheila Hancock, Sir Anthony Hopkins, Ralph Fiennes, Edward Woodward, Sir Ian Holm, Richard Attenborough, Joan Collins, Tom Courtenay, Warren Mitchell, Imelda Staunton, June Whitfield, Richard Briers, Glenda Jackson, Juliet Stevenson, Jonathan Pryce, Kenneth Branagh, Ioan Gruffud, Susannah York and Timothy Spall. In 2011, the Lir Academy was established in association with RADA at Trinity College Dublin, with the partnership of the Cathal Ryan Trust. Following RADA’s conservatoire-style, practical theatre training, the Lir Academy modelled its courses after the London-based school.

RADA has been registered with the Office for Students as a higher education institution since July 2018. The current principal of the academy is Helen Slater, who succeeded Niamh Dowling in 2022. The current president, David Harewood, succeeded Sir Kenneth Branagh in February 2024, with Cynthia Erivo appointed vice president.

== Courses ==
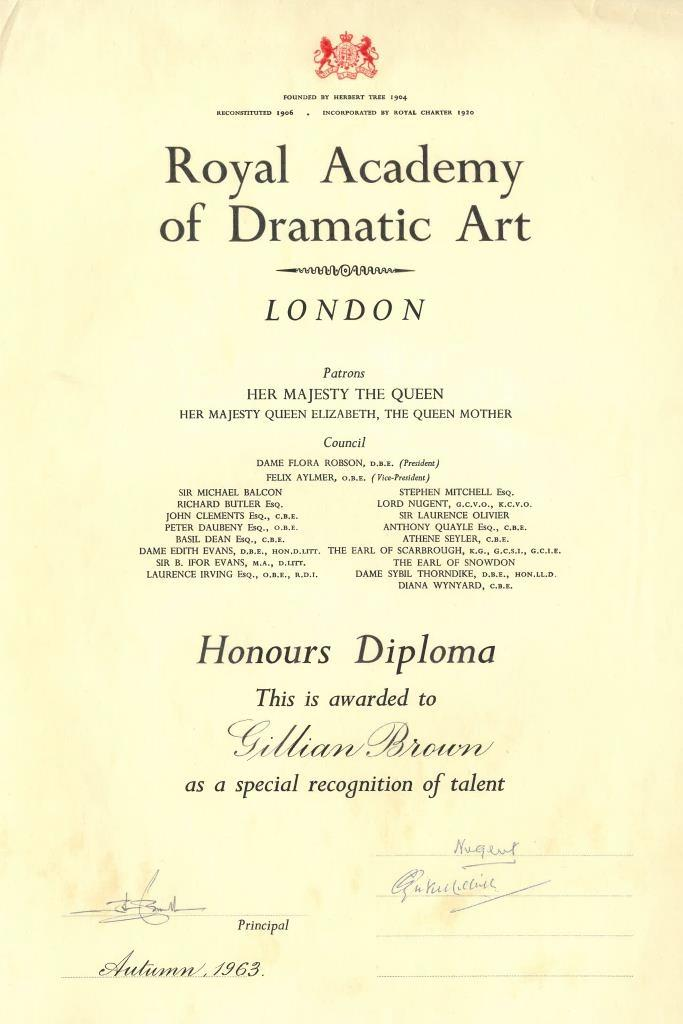
RADA diploma awarded in 1963

RADA's higher education awards are validated by King's College London (KCL) and its students graduate alongside members of the KCL Faculty of Arts & Humanities. It is based in the Bloomsbury area of Central London, close to the Senate House complex of the University of London. It is a founder member of the Federation of Drama Schools.

RADA has expanded its course offering over the years. The school offers a three-year BA (Hons) in acting degree. The first stage management course was introduced in 1962 under the directorship of Dorothy Tenham, and today students on the technical theatre and stage management degree learn theatre production skills including lighting, sound, props, costume and make-up, stage management, production management and video design. In the 1990s it launched a programme of short courses for actors and theatre technicians from around the world, including a special course for students at the NYU Tisch School of the Arts.

Other courses include a one-year acting foundation course introduced in 2007; an MA in Text & Performance, affiliated with Birkbeck, University of London, introduced in 2010; and an MA Theatre Lab course introduced in 2011.

== Campus ==
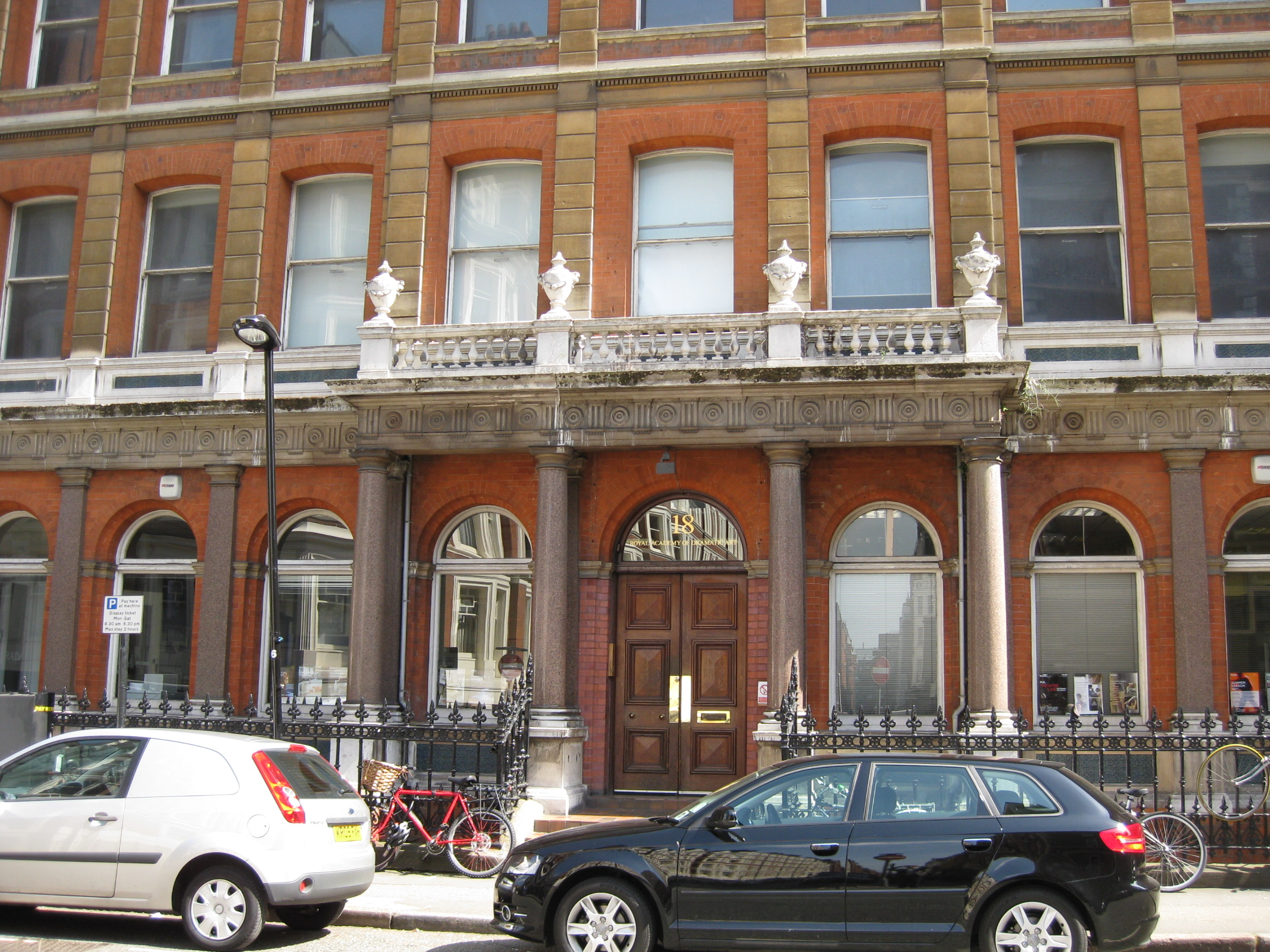
The RADA building on Chenies Street, London

RADA is based in the Bloomsbury area of Central London. The main RADA building where classes and rehearsals take place is on Gower Street (with a second entrance on Malet Street), with a second premise nearby in Chenies Street where RADA Studios is located. The Goodge Street and Euston Square underground stations are both within walking distance.

The Gower and Malet Street building was redeveloped in the late 1990s to designs by Bryan Avery, and incorporated the new theatres and linking the entrances on both streets.

=== Theatres ===
RADA has five theatres and a cinema. In the Malet Street building, the Jerwood Vanbrugh Theatre is the largest performance space with a capacity of 194; the George Bernard Shaw Theatre is a black box theatre with a capacity of up to 70; and the Gielgud Theatre is an intimate studio theatre with a capacity of up to 50. In January 2012, RADA acquired the lease to the adjacent Drill Hall venue in Chenies Street and renamed it RADA Studios. The Drill Hall is a Grade II listed building with a long performing arts history, and was where Nijinsky rehearsed with Diaghilev’s Ballets Russes in 1911. This venue has a 200-seat space, the Studio Theatre, and a 50-seat space, the Club Theatre.

In April 2016, planning permission was granted for the redevelopment of the Chenies Street premises as part of the Richard Attenborough Campaign.

=== Library ===
The RADA library contains around 30,000 items. Works include around 10,000 plays; works of or about biography, costume, criticism, film, fine art, poetry, social history, stage design, technical theatre and theatre history; screenplays; and theatre periodicals. The collection was started in 1904 with donations from actors and writers of the time such as Sir Squire Bancroft, William Archer, Sir Arthur Wing Pinero and George Bernard Shaw.

=== Other facilities ===
Other facilities at RADA include acting studios, a scenic art workshop with paint frame, costume workrooms and costume store, dance and fight studios, design studios, wood and metal workshops, sound studios, rehearsal studios, and the RADA Foyer Bar, which includes a fully licensed bar, a café and a box office.

== Admissions ==
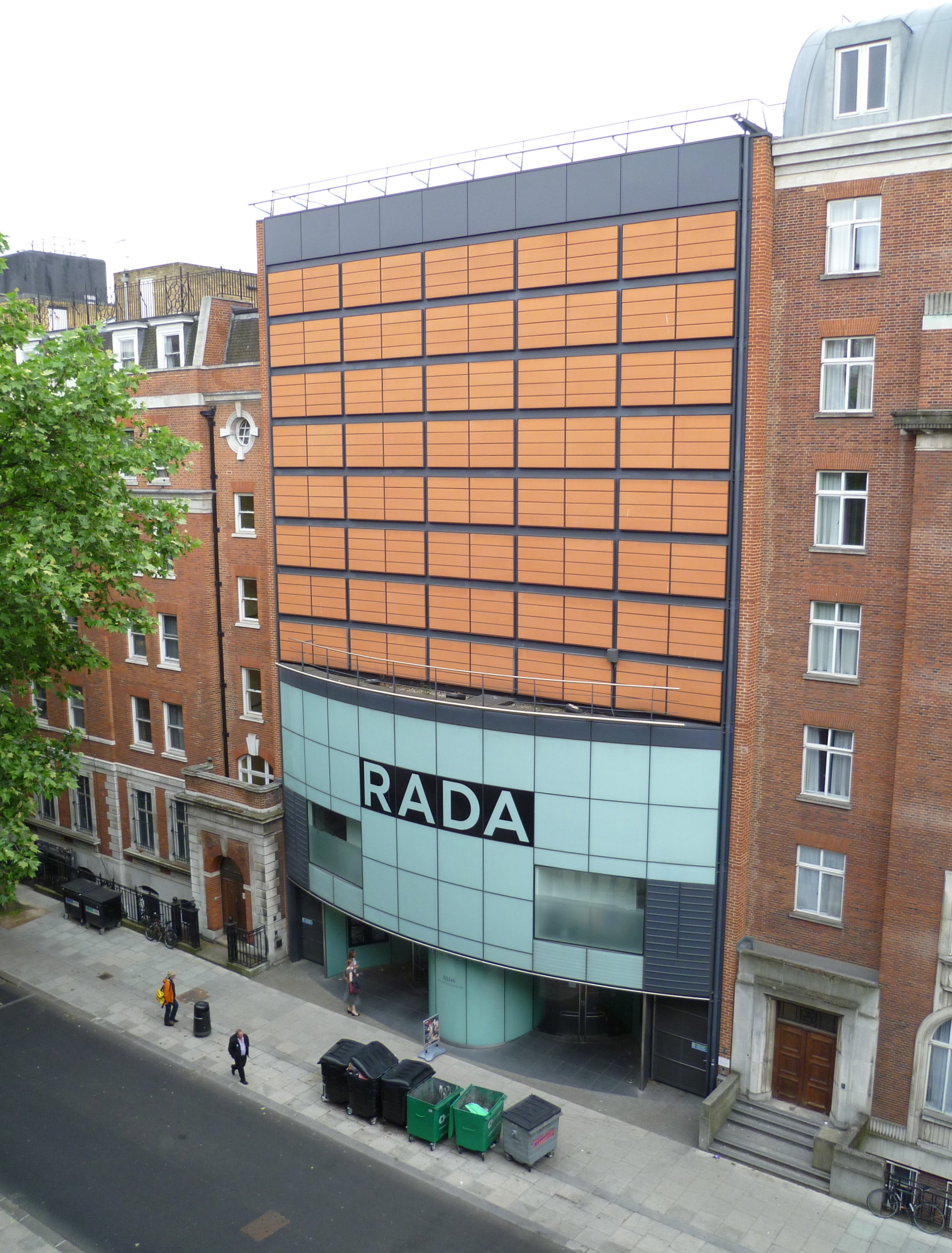
The RADA Theatres on Malet Street, London

RADA accepts up to 28 new students each year into its three-year BA (Hons) in Acting course, with a 50–50 split of male and female students. Admission into the three-year BA (Hons) in Acting course is based on suitability and successful audition, via the four-stage audition process, spanning several months. Auditions are held in London as well as in New York, Los Angeles, Dublin, and across the UK – in recent years this has included Birmingham, Bristol, Glasgow, Chester, Leicester, Sheffield, Manchester, Newcastle and Plymouth. Free auditions are offered to any applicants with a household income of under £25,000.

RADA also teaches Technical Theatre & Stage Management (TTSM) – a two-year foundation degree and with a further 'completion' year to BA level which has to be separately applied for and which allows for specialisation in all theatre craft areas. The TTSM course admits up to 30 students a year with a 50–50 gender balance, with the option to interview in Manchester and Plymouth.

RADA’s postgraduate training currently comprises a MA Theatre Lab programme and a Postgraduate Diploma in Theatre Costume (both validated by King's College London). RADA also jointly teaches an MA in Text and Performance with Birkbeck, University of London, where students on this course are enrolled at RADA as well as registered at Birkbeck. Both MA courses frequently collaborated according to their specialisms (i.e. directors on the Text & Performance programme using actors from the Theatre Lab course). Rehearsals and performances for the programmes are done mostly in the Chenies Street and Malet Street buildings.

In addition, RADA offers a series of short courses, masterclasses and summer courses for a range of standards and ages. Previous attendees have included Allison Janney, Liev Schreiber, Maggie Gyllenhaal and Emma Watson. The Academy’s education, widening participation and outreach work includes two Youth Companies, schools' workshops, Access to Acting workshops for young disabled people, Shakespeare tours to secondary schools and the RADA Shakespeare Awards.

Undergraduate students are eligible for government student loans. RADA also has a scholarships and bursaries scheme, which offers financial assistance to students.

== Leadership ==
The Royal Patron of the Academy is King Charles III, following the death of Queen Elizabeth II in 2022. The president is David Harewood, who succeeded Sir Kenneth Branagh in February 2024, with Cynthia Erivo appointed vice president. The chairman is Marcus Ryder, who succeeded Sir Stephen Waley-Cohen in 2021. Its vice-chairman was Alan Rickman until his death in 2016. The current principal of the academy is Helen Slater, who succeeded Niamh Dowling in 2026.

=== Principals ===
- Sir Herbert Beerbohm Tree (founder)
- Sir Kenneth Barnes (1909–1955)
- John Fernald (1955–1966)
- Hugh Cruttwell (1966–1985)
- Oliver Neville (1984–1993)
- Nicholas Barter (1993–2007)
- Edward Kemp (2007–2021)
- Niamh Dowling (2022–present)

=== Presidents ===
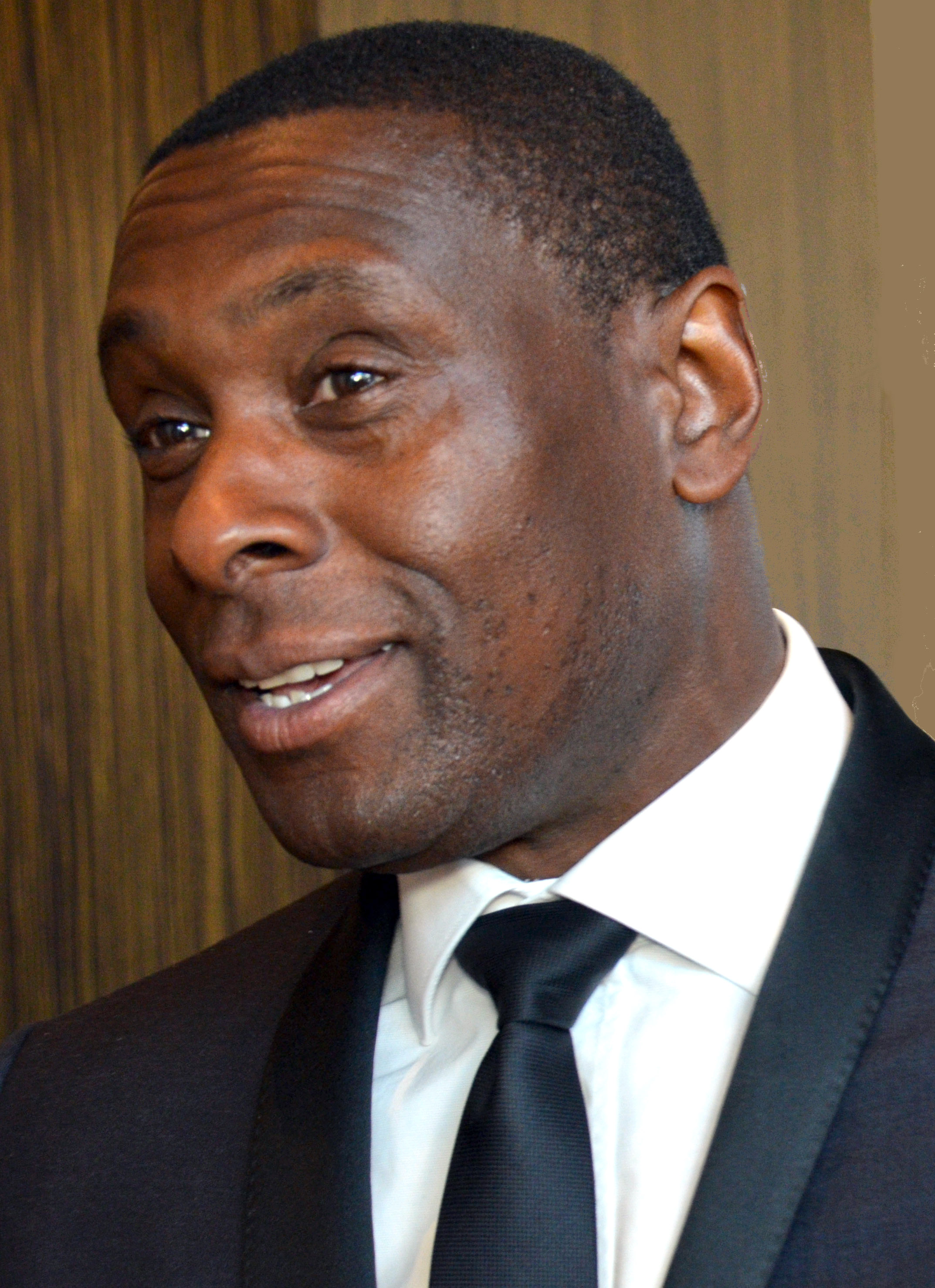
RADA alumnus David Harewood was appointed president of the school in February 2024

- Sir Squire Bancroft (1906)
- Sir Johnston Forbes-Robertson (1927–1928)
- Sir Gerald du Maurier (1929–1930)
- Henry Ainley (1931–1933)
- Lady Tree (1934–1935)
- Cyril Maude (1945)
- Dame Irene Vanbrugh (1946–1947)
- Dame Sybil Thorndike (1948–1949)
- Athene Seyler (1950–1951)
- Sir Felix Aylmer (1954)
- Dame Flora Robson (1955–1963)
- Dame Edith Evans (1964–1976)
- Sir John Gielgud (1977–1989)
- Diana, Princess of Wales (1989–1997)
- Richard, Lord Attenborough (2002–2014)
- Sir Kenneth Branagh (2014–2024)
- David Harewood (2024–present)

=== Honorary fellows ===
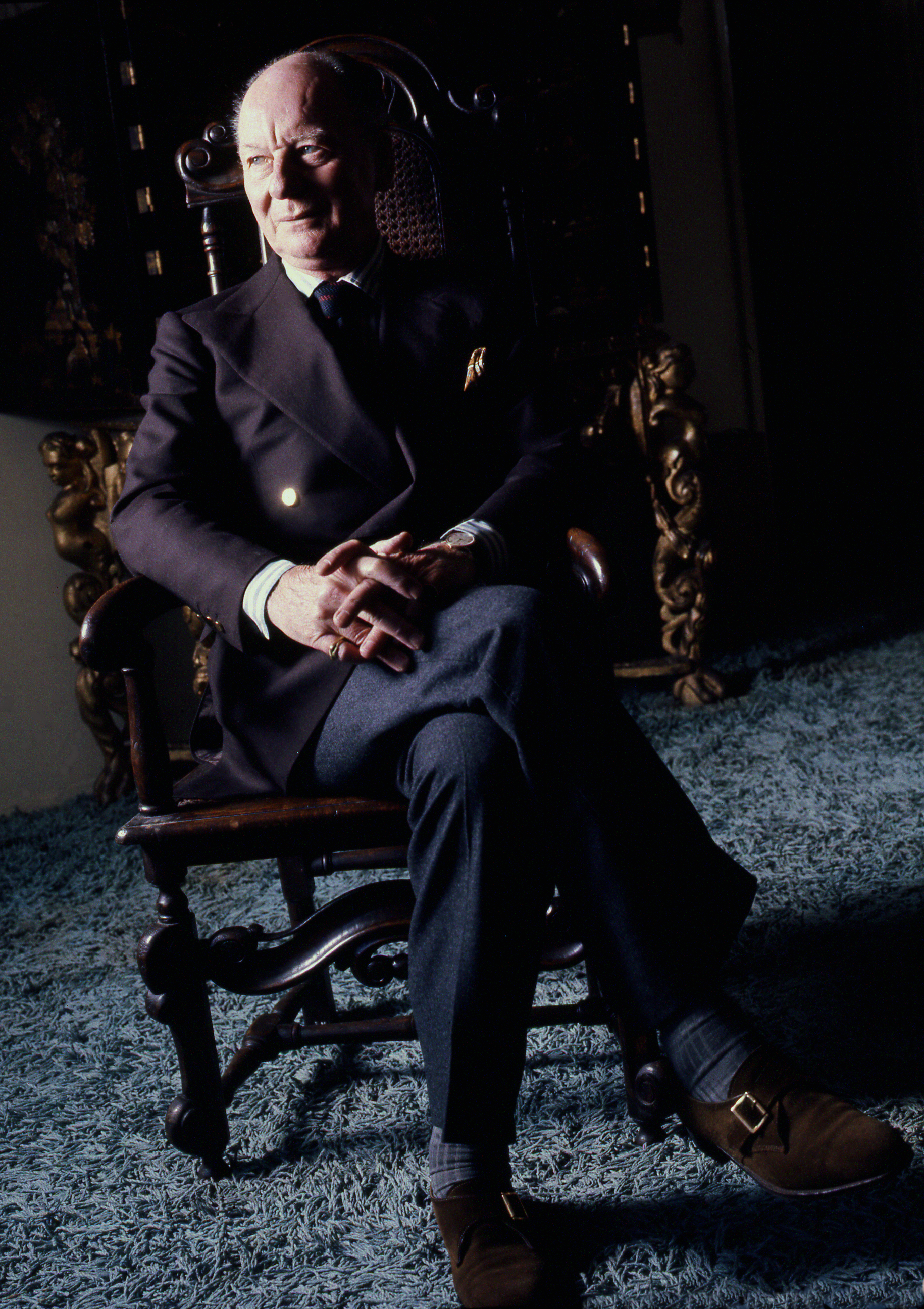
Sir John Gielgud, first honorary fellow of the school

Listed alphabetically by date of appointment

- Sir John Gielgud (1989)
- Cicely Berry (2018)
- Thelma Holt (2018)
- Glenda Jackson (2018)
- Francine Watson Coleman (2019)
- Mona Hammond (2019)
- Sir Anthony Hopkins (2019)
- Stephen Sondheim (2019)
- Kathryn Hunter (2023)
- Winsome Pinnock (2023)
- Michael Sheen (2025)
- Mike Leigh (2025)
- Lindy Hemming (2025)
- Imelda Staunton (2026)

== Notable alumni ==
- Mark Addy – Game of Thrones, The Full Monty
- Jonas Armstrong – Robin Hood, Edge of Tomorrow
- Gemma Arterton – Quantum of Solace, Clash of the Titans
- Richard Attenborough – The Great Escape, Miracle on 34th Street, Jurassic Park
- David Bamber – Pride and Prejudice, Valkyrie
- Sean Bean – The Lord of the Rings, GoldenEye, Game of Thrones, Broken
- Brian Bedford – Robin Hood, seven Tony Award nominations
- Stephen Beresford – The Last of the Haussmans, Pride
- Eve Best – The Honourable Woman, The King's Speech, House of the Dragon
- Michael Blakemore – (Privates on Parade)
- Peter Bowles – To the Manor Born, I, Claudius
- David Bradley – Harry Potter, Game of Thrones, Doctor Who
- Kenneth Branagh – Henry V, Harry Potter and the Chamber of Secrets, Dunkirk, Tenet, Oppenheimer
- Barbara Bryne – Sunday in the Park with George, Into the Woods, Amadeus
- Jessie Buckley – Hamnet, War and Peace, Wild Rose, Judy
- Tom Burke – The Musketeers, Strike, Furiosa: A Mad Max Saga, Black Bag
- Bertie Carvel – Doctor Foster, A Knight of the Seven Kingdoms
- Eva Ceja – Aquarium of the Dead, The Amityville Harvest, Touch
- Lolita Chakrabarti – Red Velvet, Jekyll & Hyde
- Oona Chaplin - Game of Thrones, Avatar: Fire and Ash
- Chipo Chung – Fortitude, A.D. The Bible Continues
- Sian Clifford – Fleabag
- Richard Coleman – Ben-Hur, There's a Girl in My Soup, ...And Mother Makes Three, ...And Mother Makes Five
- Joan Collins – Dynasty, The Girl in the Red Velvet Swing
- Daisy May Cooper – This Country
- Lauren Crace – EastEnders
- Roland Culver – Thunderball
- Ian Dallas – 8½
- Timothy Dalton – The Living Daylights, Licence to Kill, Hot Fuzz, The Crown
- Arthur Darvill – Doctor Who, Broadchurch
- David Dawson – My Policeman, The Last Kingdom
- Frank Dillane – Fear the Walking Dead, Harry Potter and the Half-Blood Prince
- Adetomiwa Edun – Merlin, FIFA video games
- Taron Egerton – Kingsman: The Secret Service, Rocketman
- Tom Prior – Firebird, Kingsman: The Secret Service, The Theory of Everything
- Denholm Elliott – Alfie, Raiders of the Lost Ark, Trading Places
- Robert Englund – A Nightmare on Elm Street
- Brian Epstein – manager of The Beatles
- Cynthia Erivo – Wicked, Wicked: For Good, Harriet
- Trevor Eve – Shoestring, Waking the Dead
- Barbara Ewing – Brass, When the Whales Came, Mute
- Patsy Ferran – Jamestown, Summer and Smoke
- Ralph Fiennes – Schindler's List, Harry Potter, Skyfall, The Grand Budapest Hotel, Conclave
- Albert Finney – Saturday Night and Sunday Morning, Erin Brockovich
- Edward Fox – The Day of the Jackal, Edward & Mrs. Simpson
- Laurence Fox – Lewis, Elizabeth: The Golden Age
- Michael Gambon – Harry Potter, The King's Speech, Fantastic Mr. Fox
- John Gielgud – Arthur, Gandhi
- Iain Glen – Game of Thrones, Silo
- Julian Glover – Indiana Jones and the Last Crusade, The Empire Strikes Back, Game of Thrones
- Eva Gray – The Trudy Lite Show, The Trudy Lite Chat Show, Marilyn Monroe, Sooty Heights
- Hugh Griffith – Ben-Hur, Oliver!
- Ioan Gruffudd – Hornblower, Titanic, Fantastic Four
- Sheila Hancock – Cabaret, Sweeney Todd
- Terry Hands – founder of Liverpool Everyman Theatre, artistic director of Royal Shakespeare Company
- Bryony Hannah – Call the Midwife
- Cedric Hardwicke – The Ten Commandments
- David Harewood – Homeland, The Night Manager, Supergirl
- Rosemary Harris – Tom & Viv, Holocaust
- Lisa Harrow – Nancy Astor, The Last Days of Chez Nous, The Final Conflict
- Nyasha Hatendi – Casual
- Sally Hawkins – The Shape of Water, Paddington
- Raymond Hawthorne – As Dreams Are Made On, Children of the Dog Star, Shortland Street
- James Hayter – The Pickwick Papers, Trio, The Onedin Line
- Tom Hiddleston – The Night Manager, Marvel Cinematic Universe, The Life of Chuck
- Ciarán Hinds – Munich, There Will Be Blood, Game of Thrones
- Ian Holm – Alien, Henry V, The Fifth Element, The Lord of the Rings
- Anthony Hopkins – The Silence of the Lambs, The Lion in Winter, Westworld
- Jane Horrocks – Little Voice, Absolutely Fabulous
- Trevor Howard – Brief Encounter, The Third Man
- Tom Hughes — Victoria, Cemetery Junction
- John Hurt – Alien, The Elephant Man
- Wilfrid Hyde-White – My Fair Lady
- Glenda Jackson – Women in Love, Sunday Bloody Sunday
- Marianne Jean-Baptiste – Secrets & Lies, Broadchurch
- Lionel Jeffries – Chitty Chitty Bang Bang
- Mervyn Johns – Jamaica Inn, Scrooge
- Celia Johnson – Brief Encounter, The Prime of Miss Jean Brodie
- Gemma Jones – Sense and Sensibility, Bridget Jones's Diary
- Alex Kingston – Croupier, ER, Doctor Who
- Charles Laughton – Mutiny on the Bounty, The Hunchback of Notre Dame
- Tamara Lawrance – King Charles III, The Long Song
- Vivien Leigh – Gone with the Wind, A Streetcar Named Desire
- Mike Leigh – Abigail's Party, Secrets & Lies
- Tom Lewis – Gentleman Jack
- Anton Lesser – Game of Thrones, Andor, Wolf Hall, Endeavour
- Adrian Lester – Hustle, Henry V
- Robert Lindsay – My Family, Me and My Girl
- Andrew Lincoln – The Walking Dead, Love Actually
- Joan Littlewood – director A Taste of Honey, Oh, What a Lovely War!
- Margaret Lockwood – The Lady Vanishes, Night Train to Munich
- Ida Lupino – The Adventures of Sherlock Holmes
- Emma Lowndes – Harry Potter and the Cursed Child
- Matthew Macfadyen – Pride & Prejudice, Succession, Deadpool & Wolverine
- Stephen Mangan – Episodes, Postman Pat: The Movie
- Nathaniel Martello-White – Collateral
- Stefanie Martini – Prime Suspect 1973, Crooked House
- Daniel Mays – Ashes to Ashes, Line of Duty
- Gugu Mbatha-Raw – Black Mirror, Loki
- Steve McFadden – EastEnders
- Paul McGann – Withnail and I, Alien 3, Doctor Who
- Ian McShane – John Wick, Deadwood, American Gods
- Janet McTeer – Wuthering Heights, The Menu
- Tobias Menzies – Game of Thrones, Outlander, The Crown
- Roger Moore – The Saint, James Bond
- Robert Morley – The African Queen
- Wunmi Mosaku – Sinners, Lovecraft Country, Luther
- Corey Mylchreest – Queen Charlotte: A Bridgerton Story
- Alan Napier – Batman
- John Neville – The Adventures of Baron Munchausen
- Vincenzo Nicoli – Alien 3, The Dark Knight
- Sue Nicholls – Coronation Street
- Dean Norris – Breaking Bad, Under the Dome
- Rufus Norris – artistic director, National Theatre
- Sophie Okonedo – Hotel Rwanda, Dirty Pretty Things, Ratched
- Joe Orton – playwright, Loot, What the Butler Saw
- Peter O'Toole – Lawrence of Arabia, The Lion in Winter, Troy, Ratatouille
- Clive Owen – Children of Men, Sin City
- Bruce Payne – Passenger 57, Highlander: Endgame
- Maxine Peake – Silk, The Village
- Jon Pertwee Worzel Gummidge, Doctor Who (expelled)
- Siân Phillips – I, Claudius; Tinker, Tailor, Soldier, Spy
- Jonathan Pryce – Brazil, Pirates of the Caribbean, Slow Horses
- Paul Pyant – lighting designer, Charlie and the Chocolate Factory
- Basil Radford – Jamaica Inn, Night Train to Munich
- Claude Rains – Casablanca, The Invisible Man, Notorious
- Jessica Raine – Call the Midwife, Jericho
- Anne Reid – Dinnerladies, Last Tango in Halifax
- Matthew Rhys – Brothers & Sisters, The Americans, Widow's Bay
- Paul Rhys – The Assets, Chaplin, Saltburn
- John Rhys-Davies – The Lord of the Rings, Indiana Jones
- Alan Rickman – Harry Potter, Die Hard, Sense and Sensibility
- Diana Rigg – Game of Thrones, On Her Majesty's Secret Service
- Andrea Riseborough – Birdman, Oblivion
- Mark Rylance – Bridge of Spies, Dunkirk
- Grace Saif – 13 Reasons Why
- Peter Sallis – Last of the Summer Wine, Wallace and Gromit
- Fiona Shaw – My Left Foot, Harry Potter, Andor
- Robert Shaw – Jaws, A Man for All Seasons
- Sebastian Shaw – Return of the Jedi
- Michael Sheen – Good Omens, Midnight in Paris
- Kyle Soller – Poldark
- Timothy Spall – Harry Potter, The King's Speech
- Imelda Staunton – Harry Potter, Vera Drake, Another Year
- Juliet Stevenson – Truly, Madly, Deeply, Bend It Like Beckham
- Michelle Terry – artistic director, Shakespeare's Globe
- John Thaw – Inspector Morse, Kavanagh QC
- Luke Thompson – Bridgerton, Transatlantic, A Little Life, Love Labour's Boat
- Indira Varma – Game of Thrones, The Night Manager
- John Vernon – The Outlaw Josey Wales
- Phoebe Waller-Bridge – Fleabag, Killing Eve
- Chris Walley – The Young Offenders, The Lieutenant of Inishmore
- Jason Watkins – Being Human, Lark Rise to Candleford
- David Warner – Straw Dogs, Star Trek, Titanic
- Ben Whishaw – Skyfall, Paddington, The Lobster
- June Whitfield – Terry and June, Absolutely Fabulous
- Tom Wilkinson – Michael Clayton, Eternal Sunshine of the Spotless Mind
- Michael Williams – Elizabeth R, Educating Rita
- Richard Wilson – One Foot in the Grave, Merlin
- Susan Wokoma – Chewing Gum, Year of the Rabbit
- Aimee Lou Wood – Sex Education, The White Lotus
- Edward Woodward – The Wicker Man, The Equalizer
- Owain Yeoman – The Mentalist, Troy
- Susannah York – Tom Jones, They Shoot Horses, Don't They?, Superman (1978)
- Kit Young – Shadow and Bone
