= Zoombies =

2016 American TV film

- UK DVD cover
- Written by: Scotty Mullen
- Directed by: Glenn R. Miller
- Starring: Ione Butler; Andrew Asper; Marcus Anderson; Kim Nielsen; LaLa Nestor; Brianna Chomer; Aaron Groben; Kaiwi Lyman-Mersereau; Tammy Klein; Isaac Anderson; William McMichael; Reuben Uy
- Music by: Christopher Cano
- Country of origin: United States
- Original language: English

Production
- Producer: David Micheal Latt
- Cinematography: Bryan Koss
- Editor: James Kondelik
- Running time: 87 minutes

Original release
- Release: March 1, 2016

Zoombies is a 2016 American science fiction action horror television film directed by Glenn R. Miller and written by Scotty Mullen. It stars Ione Butler, Andrew Asper, Marcus Anderson Kim Nielsen, LaLa Nestor, Brianna Chomer, Aaron Groben, Kaiwi Lyman-Mersereau, Tammy Klein, Isaac Anderson, William McMichael and Reuben Uy. Taking place at the soon-to-be-open Eden Wildlife Zoo, the film follows a group of staff members and college students as they find themselves being attacked by the zoo's animals who have turned into aggressive and bloodthirsty zombies after being infected by a mysterious virus.

Mullen took inspiration from Jurassic Park, The Birds, and Zombeavers for the film. The film is produced and distributed by The Asylum and was released on March 1, 2016. A prequel, Zoombies 2 was released on March 26, 2019, while a spin-off film, Aquarium of the Dead, was released on May 21, 2021.

== Plot ==
The Eden Wildlife Zoo, a zoo in northern Arizona containing rare animals, is having its intern orientation day, where college students applying for jobs as interns are touring the zoo. Meanwhile, some of the zoo's monkeys contract an unknown disease and are taken to the clinic, where the veterinarians use intracardiac epinephrine to save the life of a monkey that suffered a cardiac arrest. The contagious pathogen spreads to all of the monkeys in the room, turning them into zombies with predatory behavior towards humans. They attack the veterinarians and kill one of them, while the remaining one, Dr. Gordon, manages to activate an alarm.

As the college students arrive, the alarm reaches the zoo's security. One of the security team members, Johnny, decides to check on the veterinarians himself. When he doesn't return, the security team, accompanied by college student Gage, make their way to the clinic. Once there, they discover Johnny and one of the veterinarians dead, and Gordon barely alive. The monkeys violently attack the group, killing two guards. Gage, head of security Rex and newly hired Lizzy Hogan manage to escape.

Ellen Rogers, the manager of the zoo, gets word of the mayhem and puts the zoo on lockdown. The disease spreads throughout the zoo, infecting a group of warthogs that attack three of the students. Lizzy, Gage and Rex arrive just as the students are then attacked by infected giraffes, which kill two of them. They rescue the remaining student, Amber, but Gage is injured, and as Lizzy and Rex tend to Gage's wounds, Amber steals their jeep, forcing them to use a group of non-infected elephants as transportation. But along the way, the elephants become spooked by a group of infected lemurs in the nearby trees, throwing Lizzy, Rex, and Gage from their backs. In the ensuing chaos, Rex's leg is crushed by one of the elephants. One of the workers, Daxton, and his intern A.J. fend off the lemurs, and the group takes refuge inside the gorilla lab. Daxton goes to check on the zoo's endangered gorilla, Kifo, finding him infected. Kifo kills him and invades the lab. Rex stabs him, but Kifo crushes his head in retaliation.

Meanwhile, a police team arrives at the zoo to attempt to eliminate the threat but are killed by a pride of infected lions. Amber reaches the front gate and demands that Ellen, who is watching over the security cameras, open it, but is mauled by an infected lion. Ellen's daughter Thea is attacked by an infected koala, but she kills it with a baseball bat. Ellen inspects the koala's blood and discovers that the disease was created by an unknown enzyme found in the koala's cerebral cortex. She encourages birdkeeper Chelsea to release the birds to prevent them from being infected, to no avail.

Lizzy, Gage and A.J. escape and find a dying Amber driving their jeep, and they are attacked by the infected lions. They kill the lions but accidentally crash the jeep. They then attempt to reach the watch tower by using an unfinished zipline, but A.J. falls to his death. Lizzy and Gage reunite with Ellen and Thea, and they theorize that the birds have become infected. They decide to set the aviary on fire using gas cans, but before they do so, Lizzy and Gage go inside to rescue Chelsea and her intern Ricky. They soon find Ricky, killed by the infected birds, and Chelsea alive but eviscerated, with an infected bald eagle using her as a nest. Lizzy and Gage notice smoke rising, realize that Ellen has begun burning the aviary down, and manage to escape. They set off an additional explosion using Ellen's truck, killing the birds before they can break out of the aviary.

Kifo then appears and chases the group to the gate, where Ellen seemingly shoots him to death. The four are then rescued by a helicopter. However, after they are picked up, Kifo opens his eyes, revealing he is still alive.

== Cast ==
- Ione Butler as Leslie "Lizzy" Hogan
- Andrew Asper as Gage
- LaLa Nestor as Thea Rogers
- Kim Nielsen as Dr. Ellen Rogers
- Marcus Anderson as Rex Bombam
- Brianna Chomer as Amber
- Aaron Groben as A.J.
- Kaiwi Lyman-Mersereau as Daxton
- William McMichael as Boris Voltak
- Reuben Uy as T.Y. Lim
- Isaac Anderson as Ricky
- Tammy Klein as Chelsea
- Cedric Jonathan as Johnny
- Joe Conti as Monte Zuigen
- Noa Pharaoh as Dr. Kane Gordon
- Jennifer Titus as Robin Foxworth
- Michael Delgado as Gus
- Jay Kwon as Kyle
- Bryan Sloyer as Robbie

== Reception ==
Ted Hentschke of Dread Central rated the film 3/5 stars and wrote, "There's nothing defensibly good about this movie. What it is, however, is fun." Bloody Disgusting wrote "Zoombies is a consistently entertaining ride.." and "It’s not necessarily a good movie, but it’s worth a watch if you’re up for some mindless fun and don’t mind the technical shortcomings."

== Prequel ==
A prequel titled Zoombies 2 was released on March 26, 2019.

== Spinoffs ==
In 2021, a spinoff film titled Aquarium of the Dead was released, starring Vivica A. Fox and D. C. Douglas. The film is set after the events of Zoombies and features aquatic animals at the Shining Sea Aquarium turning into zombies due to epinephrine from Eden Wildlife Zoo.

Zoombies is one of the films featured in the 2022 crossover film 2025 Armageddon, released to celebrate The Asylum's twenty-fifth anniversary. In this film, a hostile alien race sends facsimiles of Asylum monsters to attack Earth. These include a group of zombified zoo animals, including a koala and a rhinoceros.
