= Jossara Jinaro =

Brazilian actress (1973–2022)

- Jinaro in 2014
- Born: 25 May 1973; Rio de Janeiro, Brazil
- Died: 27 April 2022 (aged 48); United States
- Occupation: Actress
- Years active: 1997–2022
- Spouse: Matt Bogado
- Children: 2

Jossara Jinaro (May 25, 1973 – 27 April 2022) was a Brazilian actress.

== Early life ==
Jossara Jinaro was born in Rio de Janeiro, on 25 May 1973, the daughter of two Maoist parents. At an early age, she was raised in Colombia after her mother married a diplomat. They relocated to the United States after her stepfather was held hostage by guerillas.

At the age of 16, she went to pursue a career in acting before she landed a job in Los Angeles after graduating from college.

== Career ==
After playing minor roles in foreign language television series, she made her first American appearance Rosetta in the 2002 action film Collateral Damage, starring Arnold Schwarzenegger. She also appeared as the recurring character Courtney Messina, the daughter of Ignacio Messina (Cheech Marin), in the CBS television series Judging Amy.

She has guest appearances in several television shows, including ER, Without a Trace, The Young and the Restless, The Closer, Southland, Trophy Wife and Animal Kingdom.

== Personal life ==
Jinaro was married to Matt Bogado, and she had two children. On 27 April 2022, Jinaro died at the age of 48 from cancer.

== Filmography ==
=== Film ===
Year	Title	Role	Notes
2002	Collateral Damage	Rosetta	
2005	The Devil's Rejects	Maria Gomez	
2006	World Trade Center	Will's Operation Nurse	
2008	Flyboys	Felicitas	
2011	Puss in Boots	Additional Voice	Uncredited
2015	Callejero	Tejanna	
2018	Cucuy: The Boogeyman	Rosa	
2022	Ten Tricks	Marina del Rey	Final film role

=== Television ===
Year	Title	Role	Notes
1999	Placas	Florencia	Episode: "La Quinceanera"
2000–2001	¡Viva Vegas!	Virginia Bustos	Main cast
2001	Strong Medicine	Felice Ramirez	Episode: "Wednesday Night Fever"
2002–2007	Passions	Rae	Recurring cast
2004	Judging Amy	Courtney Messina	3 episodes
2005	ER	Andrea Clemente	Episode: "Here and There"
2006	Without a Trace	Gail	Episode: "More Than This"
2006	The Young & the Restless	Rosa	1 episode
2013	East Los High	Reina	Recurring cast
2014	Trophy Wife	Serafina	Episode: "Couples Therapy"
2018	Animal Kingdom	Gloria	Episode: "The Hyenas"
2021	Nancy Hernandez & the Black Widows	Dulce	Unknown episodes

=== Video games ===
Year	Title	Role	Notes
2011	Cars 2: The Video Game	Carla Veloso (voice)	
2014	Cars: Fast as Lightning	Carla Veloso (voice)	
