= The Fifth of November =

2018 film by Javier Augusto Nunez

- Poster
- Directed by: Javier Augusto Nunez
- Written by: Qurrat Ann Kadwani; Javier Augusto Nunez
- Produced by: Christopher Holloway; Qurrat Ann Kadwani; Javier Augusto Nunez
- Starring: Qurrat Ann Kadwani; William H. Bryant Jr.; Joanna DeLane; Shaw Jones
- Cinematography: Ray Gallardo
- Edited by: Javier Augusto Nunez
- Music by: Lynn Neumann
- Production company: Infrastructure Productions
- Distributed by: ShortsTV
- Release date: June 1, 2018
- Running time: 16 minutes
- Country: United States
- Language: English

The Fifth of November is a 2018 psychological thriller short film directed by Javier Augusto Nunez and written by Nunez and Qurrat Ann Kadwani. The film stars Kadwani, William H. Bryant Jr., Joanna DeLane and Shaw Jones.

== Cast ==
- Qurrat Ann Kadwani as Jane Evans
- William H. Bryant Jr. as Zachary Williams
- Joanna DeLane as Alejandra Guerrero
- Shaw Jones as Owen Smith

== Production ==
The Fifth of November was created in San Diego. Actress Qurrat Ann Kadwani starred in and produced the film.

== Release ==
The film screened at the San Diego International Film Festival, NYC International Reel Film Festival and NewFilmmakers NY. The film was distributed by ShortsTV.

== Reception ==
Horrornews.net claims that "the filmmakers did a commendable job giving us a horror film based on real-world events and treated the subject matter with respect. Jeremie Sabourin of Cinema Smack scored it 4 out of 5 stars and said that while it "isn't quite an enjoyable view given its subject matter, it's a thought-provoking piece of cinema that's certainly worthy of discussion." Olivia York at Agnès Films called it "stunning [...] and does not sugarcoat the effects" of mass shootings. Rebecca Cherry at Film Carnage rated it 4 out of 5 stars claiming "it's a poignant satire that has an important message." In a review at Asian Movie Pulse, Adam Symchuk says that "although the short film may have some valid points, the way the subject matter is presented negates social message." Movie Deputy rated it 1 out of 10 calling it "a vile and disgusting presentation." Richard Propes of The Independent Critic says it is "an engaging, memorable film with a strong central performance by Kadwani." She won two awards for Best Actress.
