= Ryan Masson =

American actor

- Born: Memphis, Tennessee
- Education: White Station High School; College of Charleston; California Institute of the Arts
- Occupation: Actor
- Notable credits: The Last Stop in Yuma County; Proximity
- Television: The Last of Us

Ryan Masson is an American actor who appeared in the films Frontier Crucible (2025), The Last Stop in Yuma County (2023), Proximity (2020), I Brake for Caterpillars (2024), and several television shows including season 2 of The Last of Us (2025).

== Personal life ==
Masson grew up in Memphis, Tennessee to Rick and Carla Masson. He performed in plays at White Station High School and a production of Child's Play at Theatre Memphis. He attended College of Charleston for biology and French and considered wildlife conservation. After auditioning for several graduate programs, Masson got in to California Institute of the Arts in Los Angeles.

== Career ==
While in school, Masson was cast in Feral by Morgan Jon Fox. He auditioned for Involution after seeing a casting call in Backstage Magazine, competing against more than 1,000 other submissions. In 2020, Masson starred in Proximity, a science fiction film by Eric Demeusy.

In 2025, Masson was cast in season 2 of The Last of Us as a Seraphite called Malcolm who is tortured by Jeffrey Wright's character Isaac Dixon.

== Filmography ==
Television
Year	Title	Role	Notes
2015	Feral	Carl	4 episodes
2019	The OA	Earthen Field Young Man	Episode: "The Medium & the Engineer"
2019	Good Girls	PJ	Episode: "Thelma and Louise"
2022	9-1-1: Lone Star	Mark Poling	Episode: "Prince Albert in a Can"
2023	NCIS	Arthur Vernon	Episode: "Second Opinion"
2025	The Last of Us	Malcolm	Episode: "Day One"

Film
Year	Title	Role	Notes
2018	Involution	Hamming Tyree	
2020	Proximity	Isaac Cypress	
2023	The Last Stop in Yuma County	Miles	
2024	I Brake for Caterpillars	Ethan Colby	featuring Sally Struthers, Bruce Vilanch, Mark Christopher Lawrence, Nick Young
2025	Frontier Crucible	Billy	
