= Really Spicy Opera =

US non-profit performing arts organization

- Origin: Boston, Massachusetts, U.S.
- Genres: New opera
- Years active: 2005 – present
- Members: Artistic Director; Basil Considine; Officer; Elissa Edwards; Officer; Deborah Justice; Co-Director, Aria Institute; Tess Altiveros; Co-Director, Aria Institute; Anne Wieben
- Website: spicyopera.com

Really Spicy Opera (RSO) is a non-profit performing arts organization that produces live opera and musicals in Minneapolis, Minnesota. RSO is a professional opera company that operated in Boston from 2006 to 2013; it has been based in the Twin Cities since 2014. Its programming includes a mix of new musicals and new operas, with occasional classic musicals and operas. It is a member of Opera America and the only opera company in Minnesota with a primary focus on new operas and musicals.

The company celebrated its 10th anniversary in June 2016 with a performance of the three-act Italian opera, Rigoletto, composed by Giuseppe Verdi, at the Capri Theater in Minneapolis. RSO also toured across the United States and Canada in 2017-2019, was an ensemble in residence at The University of Tennessee at Chattanooga in 2018, and performed in France in 2020.

== About ==
Really Spicy Opera has staged more than one dozen world premieres of musical works for the stage, including Aaron Krerowicz's Simple Gifts: A Copland Opera, Julia Smith's The Here and Now: Love in the 21st Century, and Leanna Kirchoff's The Clever Artifice of Harriet and Margaret. The Clever Artifice of Harriet and Margaret, an adaptation of Alice Gerstenberg's play Overtones, was the winner of the National Opera Association's 2012-2014 Chamber Opera Composition Competition. Its 2017 tour of Game of Thrones: The Musical was named one of the top highlights of the 2017 Tampa International Fringe Festival by Creative Loafing.

RSO appears regularly at festivals, concerts, and symposia. The company toured France in January 2020, giving the first-ever modern performances of André Grétry's Émilie, ou la belle esclave at the Bibliothèque Nationale de France and the Fondation des États-Unis.

=== Recent history ===
The company staged the world premiere of Game of Thrones: The Musical at the 2016 Minnesota Fringe Festival, winning the Twin Cities Arts Reader's Best of Fringe and Critic's Pick awards.

In 2017, Really Spicy Opera embarked on a series of national and international Fringe Circuit tours, including performances of Game of Thrones: The Musical on the Hawaii Fringe Festival Circuit (including the O'ahu and Maui Fringe Festivals), the Tampa Fringe Festival, and appearances at the Orlando and Montreal Fringe Festivals. The company also performed in Nashville, Tennessee during its spring tours.

RSO has achieved both critical and commercial success: Game of Thrones: The Musical was the best-selling show at its venue at the 2017 O'ahu Fringe Festival and the best-selling show overall of the 2017 Tampa International Fringe. Its world premiere of A Pickle by Deborah Yarchun completely sold out at the 2017 Minnesota Fringe Festival and was certified as the best-selling show of the festival by capacity. Its show PolySHAMory was praised by the Washington Post, received the Technician's Pick award at the 2018 Tampa International Fringe Festival, and was named a "Don't Miss" show by Montreal Rampage in 2019.

During the COVID-19 pandemic, Really Spicy Opera cancelled its mainstage season, diverting funds to start the Aria Institute for Composers and Librettists, an intensive online training program for opera writers. The program has since been funded by the Metropolitan Regional Arts Council, Minnesota State Arts Board, and National Endowment for the Arts.

== Leadership ==
Really Spicy Opera has been led since its inception by founder Basil Considine, who serves as the producing Artistic Director.

== Repertoire ==
Really Spicy Opera specializes in world premieres of new musicals and operas, which form the vast majority of its repertory. Some works that it premiered, such as The Clever Artifice of Harriet and Margaret, have entered the new opera repertory. The company occasionally produces classic musicals and operas, including Verdi's Rigoletto in 2016 and Jason Robert Brown's The Last Five Years in 2017. The Frat Party, which was staged by the company in 2014, was named a semi-finalist in The American Prize's 2017 composition competition for theatre.

According to Arts National, Really Spicy Opera follows the programming model of a 17th-century touring French opera company.

== Venues ==
Like many itinerant companies in the Twin Cities, RSO has no permanent home. It has performed at Minnesotan venues including main stages such as the Capri Theater, the Ritz Theater, the now-defunct New Century Theater; area churches; and Bryant-Lake Bowl's Cabaret Theater.

== Music and theatre education ==
Founder Basil Considine was named to Musical America Magazine's Top 30: Movers & Shapers list for 2018 in partial recognition for the company's outreach programs.

=== Aria Institute ===
In July 2020, Really Spicy Opera launched an online opera writing training programming for composers and librettists called The Aria Institute. The Aria Institute is co-directed by Anne Wieben, Basil Considine, and Tess Altiveros, with a schedule and programming supports designed to engage more women in writing opera.

=== Recent mainstage productions ===
- Meow and Forever (2023) by Jodi Goble
- Émilie, ou la belle esclave (2020) by André Grétry
- PolySHAMory (2018, 2019; multiple stagings) by Kate Robards
- The Princess Pirate Party Musical (2018) by Basil Considine
- A Pickle (2018) by Deborah Yarchun
- Amahl and the Night Visitors (2017) by Gian Carlo Menotti
- A Pickle (2017; multiple stagings) by Deborah Yarchun
- Ain't that Rich (2017) by Kate Robards
- The Last Five Years (2017) by Jason Robert Brown
- Game of Thrones: The Musical (2017; multiple stagings) by Basil Considine
- Game of Thrones: The Musical (2016) by Basil Considine
- Rigoletto (2016) by Giuseppe Verdi
- The Clever Artifice of Harriet and Margaret (2015) by Leanna Kirchoff
- The Frat Party (2014) by Basil Considine
