= Frontier Crucible =

- Theatrical release poster
- Directed by: Travis Mills
- Screenplay by: S. Craig Zahler (uncredited)
- Based on: Desert Stake-Out by Harry Whittington
- Produced by: Dallas Sonnier; David Guglielmo; Lillian Campbell; Preston Poulter
- Starring: Myles Clohessy; Thomas Jane; Ryan Masson; Armie Hammer; Mary Stickley; Eli Brown; William H. Macy
- Cinematography: Maxime Alexandre
- Edited by: Jared Bentley
- Music by: Sean Rowe
- Production companies: Bonfire Legend; Renegade Entertainment
- Distributed by: Well Go USA Entertainment
- Release date: December 5, 2025
- Running time: 125 minutes
- Country: United States
- Language: English

Frontier Crucible is a 2025 American Western film directed by Travis Mills and written by an uncredited S. Craig Zahler, based on the 1961 novel Desert Stake-Out by Harry Whittington. It stars Myles Clohessy, Thomas Jane, Ryan Masson, Armie Hammer, Mary Stickley, and Eli Brown.

The film was released by Well Go USA Entertainment on December 5, 2025. It received mixed reviews from critics.

== Plot ==
During the Apache Wars of the late 19th century, former soldier Merrick Beckford is tasked by the US Army to deliver a shipment of essential medical supplies to San Carlos, Arizona through hostile Apache territory. Beckford accepts the job and sets out alone with two mules and a wagon.

Four days into his journey, Beckford encounters the survivors of a traveling party raided by Apache warriors. The five-member party consists of frontier settlers Valerie Butler and her husband Jeff, and their three traveling companions: gunhand "Mule" Charlie McKee, his subordinate Edmund, and his son Billy. Jeff was gut-shot in the attack and is in critical condition. After a tense introduction, Beckford warily allows the group to travel with him in the medicine wagon.

McKee's group wishes to quickly travel back north to the nearest settlement, leaving Jeff to die lest he slow them down, for fear that the Apaches will return to finish them off. To Valerie's relief, Beckford refuses to leave the injured man behind. Beckford also refuses to alter his southward course to San Carlos, which will take them to a nearby watering hole where the group can recuperate. Upon reaching the oasis, Beckford removes the bullet from Jeff's wound. Tensions continue to rise between Beckford and the other three men, especially Edmund, who openly resents Beckford's authority. The trio become more insistent that the group travel north instead of south.

During negotiations, the group is interrupted when Billy senses the approach of an Apache scout. He and Beckford go to investigate. Beckford recognizes the scout and addresses him as a friend, but before they can begin to talk, Billy shoots the Apache dead where he stands. Furious, Beckford demands the other men bury the scout's body in hope of delaying the other Apaches from discovering what happened. The earlier negotiations escalate to threats of violent mutiny from Edmund, but Beckford is unmoved and McKee talks Edmund down.

While the other men are burying the body, Beckford visits the grave of his brother, a notorious Confederate outlaw who was brutally murdered two years prior while awaiting a pardon at the watering hole. He suspects that McKee and his men are responsible for his brother's death, but is not certain enough to act on this suspicion. Over dinner, McKee reveals that he and his men are traveling with a great deal of money. He offers Beckford $1000 to change course. When he is again refused, McKee finally drops his courteous attitude and openly declares his intent to violently take Beckford's wagon and mules.

During the night, the trio attack Beckford as he keeps watch. Beckford knocks Edmund unconscious and fatally shoots Billy. The next day, Jeff has recovered enough to speak and walk. He confides in Beckford that he is terrified to travel through the long stretch of Apache territory and begs him to turn northward, offering to divorce Valerie so that Beckford can have her. Disgusted at Jeff's cowardice, Beckford refuses.

As he is preparing for the group's departure, Beckford discovers that the Apaches have found the dead scout and are preparing to attack. The group leaves in haste but are quickly caught by the Apache war party, taken prisoner, and delivered to Chief Victorio. Seeing no point in further deception, McKee and Edmund reveal to Beckford that they are outlaws who robbed a bank in San Carlos, and that they are indeed the ones who killed his brother.

Victorio tortures the men, promising that if any one of them can withstand the pain without begging for mercy, he will let the entire group go free. Jeff, Edmund, and McKee fail to endure, but as Victorio is about to torture Beckford, he recognizes him as the victim of an unsanctioned renegade Apache attack some years prior. The attack had claimed the life of Beckford's wife and left him heavily scarred, and in recompense Beckford had been declared a non-combatant to be left alone by the Apache tribe. Victorio releases Beckford and promises him safe passage to San Carlos, leaving him to deal with the rest of the group as he sees fit.

As Beckford prepares to continue his journey south with Valerie and Jeff, Edmund and McKee break free of their bonds and incapacitate him, but Beckford is saved by Jeff's intervention. In the ensuing brawl, Jeff and Edmund are killed and McKee is blinded. Beckford offers McKee the choice of being taken to San Carlos to stand trial and be hanged, or being executed on the spot. McKee chooses execution and Beckford obliges. Beckford and Valerie return to the watering hole, bury the three dead men, and continue their journey together.

== Cast ==
- Myles Clohessy as Merrick Beckford
- Thomas Jane as Mule, an outlaw
- Ryan Masson as Billy, Mule's son
- Armie Hammer as Edmund, Mule's associate
- Mary Stickley as Valerie
- Eli Brown as Jeff, Valerie's wounded husband
- Zane Holtz as Abner Beckford
- Eddie Spears as Chief Victorio
- William H. Macy as Major O'Rourke

== Production ==
In October 2024, an adaptation of the 1961 Western novel Desert Stake-Out by Harry Whittington was in development, with Travis Mills directing, and Thomas Jane, Armie Hammer, William H. Macy, Myles Clohessy, Eli Brown, Eddie Spears, Zane Holtz, Jonah Kagen, and Mary Stickley joining the cast. Principal photography began on November 22, 2024, in Monument Valley and Prescott, Arizona, with Maxime Alexandre serving as the cinematographer and Ryan Masson replacing Kagen. The screenplay is uncredited; in an interview, Jane said the script was actually written by an uncredited S. Craig Zahler.

== Reception ==
Writing for The Hollywood Reporter, Frank Scheck described the film as a "competently executed but unmemorable oater", and compared the film to 1950s westerns directed by John Ford and Anthony Mann, as well as Bone Tomahawk, also produced by Dallas Sonnier. Comparatively, Scheck found the film's direction to be lacking Bone Tomahawk's "stylistic flair" and criticized the lead performance, but praised the supporting roles and the cinematography. In The Guardian, Catherine Bray gave the film three stars: "Frontier Crucible does look lovely, with plenty of evocative shots of Monument Valley and, while gorehounds may feel they have to wait too long for it, there’s some effectively staged violence reminiscent of 2015 breakout hit Bone Tomahawk, with whom it shares some of the same creative team."
