= Proximity (2020 film) =

2020 American film by Eric Demeusy

- Film poster
- Directed by: Eric Demeusy
- Written by: Eric Demeusy
- Story by: Eric Demeusy; Jason Mitcheltree
- Produced by: Eric Demeusy; Kyle McIntyre; Andrea Dondanville
- Starring: Ryan Masson; Highdee Kuan; Christian Prentice; Shaw Jones
- Cinematography: Jason Mitcheltree
- Edited by: Eric Demeusy; Ivan Ortega; Simon Carmody
- Music by: Jermaine Stegall
- Production company: Demeusy Pictures
- Distributed by: Shout! Studios
- Release date: May 15, 2020
- Running time: 120 minutes
- Country: United States
- Language: English

Proximity is a 2020 American science fiction drama film written and directed by Eric Demeusy in his directorial debut. The film stars Ryan Masson, Highdee Kuan, Christian Prentice, and Shaw Jones. Proximity was released on demand on May 15, 2020, and received poor reviews from critics.

== Plot ==
In 1979, Carl, a lumberjack working in Alaska, is abducted by aliens. In the present day, a young computer engineer named Isaac starts a video diary. After a hike in the woods, he encounters a flying saucer and encounters an alien. Three days later he wakes up near the water. He discovers that he is having hallucinations. He visits the doctor and discovers his bone is broken with a precise cut. He got the abduction on camera and uploads it to the Internet, and it goes viral. The news, media, and the government question Isaac. Isaac realizes that mysterious signs of alien life throughout history prove that aliens exist. He finds a post on the Internet by a girl his age named Sara that includes a similar story. The two meet at a local diner.

Isaac is asked to undergo a lie detector test for proof of the abduction and he passes it, leading to him being apprehended by men in black run by Agent Graves. The government discovers that Sara and Isaac each have an alien tracker in their arms and Isaac refuses to cooperate in the government's procedure. Isaac escapes with Sara and they're chased by androids. They realize that they have been taken to Costa Rica and find a hacker named Zed who helps them and admits that he knows about the United Nations agency behind the kidnapping. Zed helps them locate an elderly Carl, and they Video Chat with him. The group discovers that the aliens will come to British Columbia in five days.

Zed, Sara, and Isaac travel to British Columbia and find Carl living in a cabin. Carl disables the United Nations trackers, allowing them to stay with him for the next two days. In two days, the aliens arrive and explain that they are studying humans, believing that Jesus Christ is important to the creation of the universe. They remove Sara's tracker as the men in black surround the cabin. Agent Graves demands an answer about his father's death from Carl, who refuses and is shot by laser guns. Sara walks out of the cabin and is shot as well. The aliens remove Isaac's tracker and he unleashes telekinetic and chronokinetic powers, which he uses to escape by saving Zed and carrying Sara and Carl to safety as the cabin is destroyed. The aliens save Sara and Carl and the group escapes in a flying saucer.

Six months later, Isaac and Sara are living a normal life in Costa Rica. Zed and Carl are running a new science program and Agent Graves has been fired.

== Cast ==
- Ryan Masson as Isaac
- Highdee Kuan as Sara
- Christian Prentice as Zed
- Shaw Jones as Agent Graves
- Don Scribner as Carl
- Sarah Navratil
- Randy Davison as Dr. Kozlov

== Release ==
Shout! Studios acquired North American distribution rights to the film in February 2020. The film was released on demand on May 15, 2020.

== Reception ==
On Rotten Tomatoes, the film has an approval rating of 38% based on 24 reviews, with an average rating of 4.7/10.

Sheri Linden of The Hollywood Reporter gave the film an adverse review, writing: "Good-looking and technically well crafted, the film struggles to get past pastiche and conjure an involving world of its own." Starburst's Ed Fortune also gave the film a negative review and wrote, "The problem is the story itself. It's too long, it's unoriginal and it features story notes that never fail to irritate." Grant Hermanns of ComingSoon.net gave the film a score of 6.5/10. Lorry Kitka of Film Threat gave the film a 6 out of 10.
