= The Heiress Lethal =

2010 film by Michael Brueggemeyer

- Poster
- Directed by: Michael Brueggemeyer
- Written by: Marianne Bates
- Produced by: Tony Mingee
- Starring: Merrick McCartha; Cristyn Chandler; Jim Teiper; Ron Christopher Jones; Theresa Layne; Lorien Hill-Purcell; Peter Buitenhek
- Cinematography: Bill Bork
- Edited by: Michael Towe
- Production companies: Amalgamated Grommets; Eyefull Studios
- Release date: July 29, 2010 (48 Hour Film Project)
- Running time: 10 minutes
- Country: United States
- Language: English

The Heiress Lethal, also known as The Fatal Heir, is a 2010 American noir comedy short film directed by Michael Brueggemeyer and written by Marianne Bates. The film stars Merrick McCartha, Cristyn Chandler, Jim Teiper and Ron Christopher Jones. It won Best Film at 48 Hour Film Project San Diego and screened at the 2011 Cannes Film Festival after qualifying through Filmapalooza at the Miami International Film Festival. The film was later nominated for a Pacific Southwest Emmy Award at National Academy of Television Arts and Sciences.

== Plot ==
Veronica Baker is accused of murdering her husband to collect on his company's fortune. Johnny Love must find out if Mrs. Baker is being truthful.

== Cast ==
- Merrick McCartha
- Cristyn Chandler
- Jim Teiper
- Ron Christopher Jones
- Theresa Layne
- Lorien Hill-Purcell
- Peter Buitenhek

== Production ==
Principal photography for the film took place at The Old Townhouse Restaurant in Ocean Beach, San Diego. It was written, filmed in black and white and edited within 48 hours. Brueggemeyer said "We wanted to turn film noir genre on its ears," referring to Chandler's character having a flatulence issue.

== Release ==
The film premiered July 29, 2010, at the 48 Hour Film Project in San Diego, California. It later screened at Filmapalooza as part of the Miami International Film Festival as well as the 2011 Cannes Film Festival's Short Film Corner in France.

== Reception ==
Of the 90 international films that represented different global cities at Filmapalooza, The Fatal Heir put San Diego in the top 16 which made it eligible for the 2011 Cannes Film Festival.

Accolades
List of awards and nominations
Festival	Year	Award	Recipient(s)	Result	Ref.
48 Hour Film Project San Diego	2010	Best Acting Ensemble	Merrick McCartha, Cristyn Chandler, Jim Teiper, Ron Christopher Jones, Theresa Layne, Lorien Hill-Purcell, Peter Buitenhek	Won	
48 Hour Film Project San Diego	2010	Best Cinematography	Bill Bork	Won	
48 Hour Film Project San Diego	2010	Best Director	Mike Brueggemeyer	Won	
48 Hour Film Project San Diego	2010	Best Film	The Fatal Heir	Won	
48 Hour Film Project San Diego	2010	Audience Award: Group D	The Fatal Heir	Won	
San Diego Film Awards	2014	Best Actor	Merrick McCartha	Won	
San Diego Film Awards	2014	Best Cinematography	Bill Bork	Won	
National Academy of Television Arts and Sciences	2016	Short Format Program for Pacific Southwest Emmy Award	Michael Towe, Mike Brueggemeyer, Marianne Bates	Nominated	
