= Shaw Jones =

American actor (born 1969)

- Born: June 8, 1971 (age 55); Memphis, Tennessee
- Education: Memphis University School; Southern Methodist University
- Occupation: Actor
- Known for: Blue; Dust to Dust; Proximity
- Notable credits: End of Sentence; The Fifth of November; The Forever Purge
- Parents: Pat Walsh; Hall Jones
- Website: https://www.shawjonesactor.com/

Shaw Jones (born 23 September 1969) is an American actor, best known for his roles in the films Dust to Dust (1994), The Fifth of November (2018), Blue (2019), Proximity (2020), and The Forever Purge (2021).

== Personal life ==
Shaw Jones was born to Pat Walsh and Hall Jones in Memphis, Tennessee. A graduate of the Memphis University School, and the Southern Methodist University, he attended Sigma Alpha Epsilon with his brothers. After he earned a degree in psychology at Southern Methodist University, Jones took up acting.

== Career ==
In 1994, Jones auditioned for Dust to Dust after a teacher of his allowed him to read part of the film's screenplay. It was his first full-length film which he co-starred alongside Robert Vaughn and Willie Nelson. At 23, he played a 16 year old cowboy named Billy, who lived on a valuable watering hole property.

=== 2009–2023 ===
In 2009, Jones starred as a model suffering from amnesia after a car accident in Gordon Bressack's FUGGEDABOUTIT! at Hudson Backstage Theatre in Hollywood, Los Angeles. He later portrayed Lee Harvey Oswald in Assassins by Stephen Soundheim.

By 2020, Jones was in cast in the films Blue, Proxy, Nightingale and several network television shows, including Your Honor with Bryan Cranston. Peter Travers at Rolling Stone said his performance in Proximity is "acted to the hilt and beyond." In 2023, he was cast in Wounded, an off-broadway production by Del Shores at the SoHo Playhouse.

== Filmography ==
Year	Title	Role	Notes
1994	Dust to Dust	Billy	
2018	The Fifth of November	Owen	Short film
2019	Blue	Robert	
2019	End of Sentence	Officer Stringer	
2020	Proximity	Agent Donald Graves	
2021	The Forever Purge	Merc Moran	
2023	Pens & Pencils	Officer Shelby	Short film
