= Maui Fringe Festival =

The Maui Fringe Festival is an annual alternative theatre festival held in Wailuku, on the island of Maui. This Hawaii festival is part of the Hawai'i Fringe Festival circuit, in conjunction with the annual O'ahu Fringe Festival. The event is organized and sponsored by Maui Onstage, a not-for-profit organization, and has run annually since 2011. The festival is staged in July at the historic Iao Theater, and is traditionally scheduled the weekend following the O'ahu Fringe Festival in late January.

== Awards ==
2012

- First Place: Joel William Agnew
- Second Place: Pride and Joy by Paul Rudnick
- Third Place: Payday At Pukalani by Margery Kreitman
- Hoku Award for Best Performance of the Festival: Tom Althouse

2013

- First Place: They Call Me Q! by Qurrat Ann Kadwani
- Hoku Award for Best Performance of the Festival: ??

2014

- First Place: Tale of Kathaka by Antara Bhardwaj
- Second Place: War Stories by Anthony Pignataro
- Third Place: Maple Street Militia by Teresa Salyer
- Hoku Award for Best Performance of the Festival: Tale of Kathaka by Antara Bhardwaj

2015

- First Place: Hard Travelin’ With Woody by Randy Noojin
- Second Place: ??
- Hoku Award for Best Performance of the Festival: Mandarin Orange by Kate Robards

2016

- First Place: Murder Blood Bear Story by Katelyn Schiller
- Second Place: Foolish Games by Improvocation
- Third Place Award: Money Talks: But What the Hell Is It Saying? by Lucie Lynch and Marcia Zina Mager
- Audience Choice Award: Money Talks: But What the Hell Is It Saying? by Lucie Lynch and Marcia Zina Mager
- Hoku Award for Best Performance of the Festival: Murder Blood Bear Story by Katelyn Schiller

2017

- First Place: Ain't That Rich by Kate Robards
- Second Place: Small Town Lawyer by Anthony Pignataro
- Third Place: Old Girls Looking Hot by Sharyn Stone
- Audience Choice Award: Ain't That Rich by Kate Robards
- Hoku Award for Best Performance of the Festival: Me, My Song, and I by Malcolm Grissom

2018

- First Place: The Sex Life of Achilles by David LeBarron
- Second Place: Intrusion by Qurrat Ann Kadwani
- Third Place: Courted by Alison Logan
- Audience Choice Award: Vindication: Scenes from the Life of Mary Wollstonecraft by Lin McEwan
- Hoku Award for Best Performance of the Festival: Intrusion by Qurrat Ann Kadwani

== Festival Lineups ==
=== 2014 ===
- War Stories by Anthony Pignataro
- The Maple Street Militia by Teresa Salyer
- Tale of Kathaka by Antara Bhardwaj
- Adaptations Dance Theater

=== 2015 ===
- Vivaldi’s Virgins by Early Maui Music
- Mandarin Orange by Kate Robards
- Hard Travelin’ With Woody by Randy Noojin
- Maui Improv
- BOOMERAGING: From LSD to OMG by Will Durst
- Adaptations Dance Theater
- Darshan Dance Project

=== 2016 ===
- Murder Blood Bear Story
- Money Talks: But What the Hell Is It Saying?
- Les Lapins Timides
- Foolish Games
- Maui Festival of Fringe: A Burlesque Revue
- Shadows of Hippocrates

=== 2017 ===
- Small Town Lawyer by Anthony Pignataro
- Too Old To Be This Young by Laura Hedli
- Ain’t That Rich by Kate Robards
- Game of Thrones the Musical by Really Spicy Opera
- Old Girls Looking Hot by Sharyn Stone
- Me, My Song, and I by Malcolm Grissom
- Fado by Maui Aerial Arts
- Dream by Francis Tau'a

=== 2018 ===
- The Sex Life of Achilles by David LeBarron
- Intrusion by Qurrat Ann Kadwani
- When Trump Gets To Heaven by Amorah St. John
- Courted by Alison Logan
- I Love Myself: The Masturbation Musical by Jaime Summers
- Vindication: Scenes from the Life of Mary Wollstonecraft by Lin McEwan
- Lawyers, Bombs and Death by Gabby Anderman and Chris Rose
