= Ron Christopher Jones =

American actor and production manager

- Born: Ronald Christopher Jones; San Diego, California, U.S.
- Other names: Ron C. Jones; Ronald C. Jones; RC Jones
- Occupations: Actor; production manager
- Known for: The All Night Strut; San Diego Musical Theatre
- Notable credits: The Full Monty; The Heiress Lethal; My One and Only; Thane of East County; Touch
- Television: The Lawrence Welk Show

Ronald Christopher Jones is an American film and theatre actor and production manager who appeared in productions of My One and Only (2002), The Full Monty (2018), Tarzan (2023), and the films The Heiress Lethal (2010), Thane of East County (2015), and Touch (2022).

== Personal life ==
Jones was born and raised in San Diego before moving to Los Angeles, California. In the early 1990s, he was part of the musical group Milkbone.

== Career ==
In 1994, Jones appeared in The Lawrence Welk Show in Branson, Missouri. He is production manager for San Diego Musical Theatre, joining in 2019. Jones managed a production of Hello Dolly! in 2025. He is a member of the Actors' Equity Association and the Screen Actors Guild.

== Stage credits ==
Year	Title	Role	Location	Notes
1990	A Few Hours in Hell	Oleo Miller	Progressive Stage Company, San Diego, California	
1991	Rio Can Be Murder	Hotel Bartender	Mystery Cafe, San Diego, California	
1993	Gospel According to Dickens	Fred	San Diego Repertory Theatre	
	Hello, Dolly!		Welk Resort Theatre, Escondido ?	
1995	Welk Musical Christmas		Welk Resort Theatre, Escondido, California	
1997	Welk Musical Christmas		Welk Resort Theatre, Escondido	
1998	The All Night Strut		Sierra Repertory Theatre, Sonora, California	
1999	The All Night Strut		International City Theater, Long Beach, California	
1999	Play On!		Pasadena Playhouse	
2000	Man of La Mancha	Panza's Mule	Santa Barbara Civic Light Opera	
2002	My One and Only	Mr. Magix	Starlight Theatre, Balboa Park	
2016	Ain't Misbehavin'		North Coast Repertory Theatre, Solana Beach, California	
2018	The Full Monty	Horse	Horton Grand Hotel, San Diego	
2019	House of Dreams		San Diego Repertory Theatre	Supporting cast member
2022	Iron		Moxie Theater, El Cajon, California	Fight choreographer
2023	Tarzan	Professor Porter	Moonlight Amphitheatre, Vista, California	

== Filmography ==
Year	Title	Role	Notes
2005	Surrender, Dorothy	Gay Bar Patron	Directed by Charles McDougall
2010	The Heiress Lethal	Clyde	Short film
2015	Thane of East County	Kip	
2019	God Incorporated	Martin's Father	Directed by Jeff Deverett
2022	Touch	Deputy O'Neal	Short film
