= Aquarium of the Dead =

2021 film by Glenn Miller

- Directed by: Glenn Miller
- Screenplay by: Marc Gottlieb
- Produced by: Paul Bales; David Michael Latt; Brendan Petrizzo; David Rimawi
- Starring: Vivica A. Fox; Eva Ceja; D. C. Douglas; Erica Duke
- Cinematography: Marcus Friedlander
- Production company: The Asylum
- Distributed by: The Asylum
- Release date: May 21, 2021
- Running time: 86 minutes
- Country: USA
- Language: English

Aquarium of the Dead is a 2021 American zombie comedy-horror science fiction film directed by Glenn Miller and written by Marc Gottlieb and Michael Varrati. The film stars Vivica A. Fox, Eva Ceja, and D. C. Douglas. It is a spin-off to The Asylum's Zoombies franchise. The film features zombie-like aquatic animals.

The film opens with the apparent death of an octopus at an aquarium. It soon reanimates, killing two people before escaping. The slime of the octopus infects the other animals of the aquarium. Zombified spider crabs are the first animals to attack staff members and tourists, zombified crocodiles and walruses. The reanimated animals are all blind and navigate based on sound.

== Plot ==
At the Shining Sea Aquarium, Dr. Karen James and two workers attempt to tag the resident octopus. The octopus goes into cardiac arrest as the result of the procedure and seemingly dies, then reanimates, attacks Karen, kills the two workers, and escapes into the ducts.

Meanwhile, aquarium scientist Miranda Riley receives a transmission from the Eden Wildlife Zoo warning her to dispose of any epinephrine the aquarium received. Her colleague Daniel Hanley assures her that he took care of the disposal before leaving to guide Skylar, a tourist, on a V.I.P. visit to the aquarium. Miranda meets with Senator Bailey Blackburn, who is responsible for securing additional funds for the facility, but they are interrupted by Karen warning them of the octopus. They alert security chief Eddie "Clu" Cluwirth of the breach.

Before the staff can take any action, contaminated slime left by the octopus infects the rest of the animals in the aquarium, who shatter their tanks to escape. Miranda, Karen, Blackburn, and Blackburn's aide Beth take shelter in a theater as the aquarium goes into lockdown. Elsewhere, Daniel and Skylar attempt to get back inside the building. They are attacked by a group of zombified spider crabs, but escape and manage to get inside.

Miranda's group ventures out of the theater, surmising that if they can reset the aquarium's power, the lockdown will be lifted. They come across Daniel and Skylar, as well as zombified crocodiles and walruses. Skylar loses his composure, attacks a walrus, and is killed by it. As a result of the encounter, Karen realizes the reanimated animals are blind and navigate based on sound. This allows her to use her mobile phone to trick the walrus and lead it away. However, the group soon discovers an undead starfish stuck to Beth's abdomen, which had slipped unnoticed into her notebook earlier. They cannot detach the starfish and Beth soon dies from it feeding on her.

The group passes through a shark habitat, then unites with Clu and ventures into the basement, where they are confronted by the octopus. Clu sacrifices herself in a failed attempt to kill the octopus while Miranda resets the power. Cornered by the octopus, Miranda uses a stray power cable to fatally electrocute it. The reset lifts the lockdown, and the group escapes. As they leave, the truth about the incident is discovered: Daniel was conspiring with Blackburn to cut costs at the aquarium and did not dispose of the epinephrine from the Eden Wildlife Zoo as he said he did, leading it to be used on the octopus and cause the outbreak. Miranda punches Daniel, breaking his nose, and leaves with Karen.

== Cast ==
- Vivica A. Fox as Eddie "Clu" Cluwirth
- Eva Ceja as Miranda Riley
- D. C. Douglas as Daniel Hanley
- Madeleine Falk as Dr. Karen James
- Anthony Jensen as Senator Bailey Blackburn
- Erica Duke as Beth MacKenzie

== Production ==
In an interview with Bloody Flicks, screenwriter Marc Gottlieb said he was not on set but that all special effects on the project were CGI. He said writing the script was different from his previous projects because his draft was based on an outline by Michael Varrati instead of his own.

== Release ==
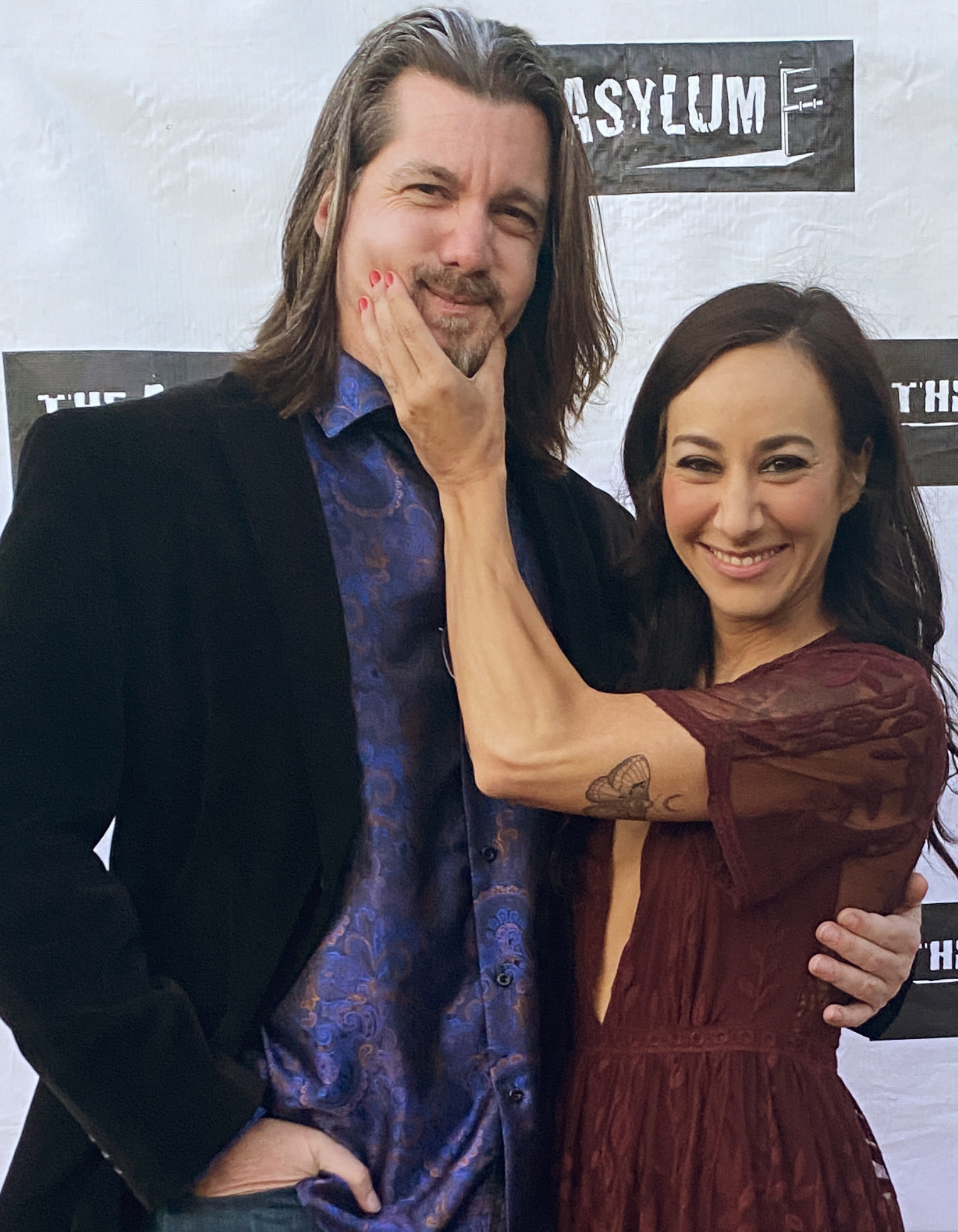
D.C. Douglas and Eva Ceja at the premiere of Aquarium of the Dead.

The film was released in theaters and video on demand on May 21, 2021. It was later released on DVD on June 21, 2021.

== Reception ==
Lloyd Farley at Collider called it one of the most enjoyable animal attack movies ever made. Paul Mount at Starburst scored it a 3 out of 5 and said it's "unlikely to make you throw up when you've digested it all." Phil Wheat at Nerdly said "if you liked either of Glenn Miller's zoological zombie films you enjoy this one too."

Paul Lê of Bloody Disgusting called it "hurriedly made" scoring it 1.5 out of 5. Jim McLennan of Film Blitz scored it a C− stating "this is a bit of a disappointment – even with the inevitable Sharknado reference."
