= Qurrat Ann Kadwani =

American actress

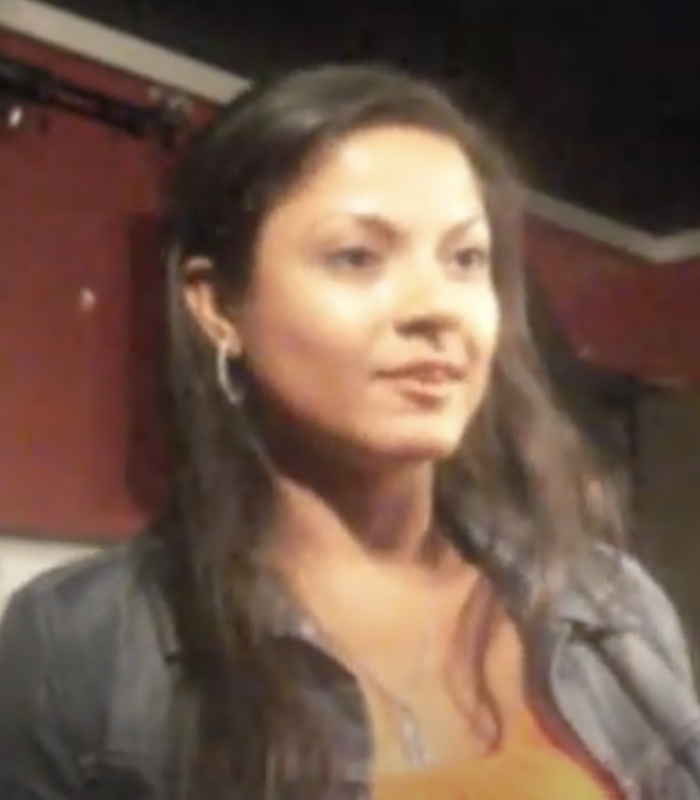
- Kadwani in 2013
- Born: May 10, 1981 (age 45); Mumbai, India
- Citizenship: United States
- Education: Bronx High School of Science; State University of New York at Geneseo
- Occupations: Actress; playwright; film producer
- Known for: They Call Me Q; Intrusion
- Notable work: The Fifth of November
- Website: qkadwani.com

Qurrat Ann Kadwani (born May 10, 1981) is an American television actress, playwright and film producer of Indian descent. She is known for They Call Me Q (2014), Intrusion (2018) and The Fifth of November (2018).

== Early life and career ==
Kadwani was raised in New York, growing up in The Bronx. She a graduate of the Bronx High School of Science and received a double scholarship for theater at State University of New York at Geneseo. Kadwani is the first South Asian woman in a solo act play Off-Broadway. In an interview with The New York Times, she expressed how she grew up wanting to be living the lives of those she knew. Kadwani co-wrote, starred in and produced The Fifth of November in 2018.

=== 2014: They Call Me Q ===
Kadwani portrayed different characters including her parents, friends, teachers and classmates in They Call Me Q. The show was a 2014 solo performance at St. Luke's Theatre, University of Minnesota Crookston, Colorado State University, Lane Community College, Frostburg State University, and premiered at the Chicago Fringe Festival. Kadwani is the production's writer as well, which won Best Play at Maui Fringe Festival.

=== 2018: Intrusion ===
In 2018, Kadwani returned to Off-Broadway with Intrusion, a solo act discussing rape. The setting is two decades in the future and follows eight character portrayals by Kadwani. She performed at St. Luke's Theatre.

== Filmography ==
=== Film ===
Year	Title	Role	Notes
2022	Beast	Sarita	Short film
2021	The Trojan	Erika Lope	Short film
2021	What Do I Owe You?	Sylvia	Short film
2021	Death Saved My Life	Reporter	TV movie
2020	The Saint of the Impossible	ICE Officer Statham	
2019	Show & Tell	Sonia	Short film
2019	Marisol	Officer Mack	Short film
2018	The First Purge	News Reporter #3	
2018	The Fifth of November	Jane Evans	Short film, also producer and co-writer
2017	Works & Nights	Dora	Short film
2014	Your Guy, My Guy	Mary	Short film
2014	The Thief	Lisa	Short film
2014	Brass	Detective Larza	Short film
2011	The Tailor	Muslim Girl	Short film

=== Television ===
Year	Title	Role	Episode(s)
2022	Inventing Anna	HR Person	"Cash on Delivery"
2022	Search Party	News Anchor	"Lamentations"
2009-2020	What Would You Do?	Bridesmaid / Woman Changing Tire / Fatima	3 episodes
2019	Unbreakable Kimmy Schmidt	Anchor	"Sliding Van Doors"
2019	Tell Me a Story	Newscaster #2	"Chapter 10: Forgiveness"
2018	Madam Secretary	Officer #1	"Night Watch"
2018	Seven Seconds	Newscaster	"A Boy and a Bike"
2017	The Sinner	Reporter #1	"Part V"
2017	Time After Time	Newscaster	2 episodes
2016	Brown Nation	Video Countdown Host	"I'm a Supastar"
2016	Falling Water	Concierge	"Don't Tell Bill"
2016	Luke Cage	Reporter 2	"Blowin' Up the Spot"
2016	Law & Order: Special Victims Unit	Stacey King	"Townhouse Incident"
2015	The Blacklist	Medical Tech	"Sir Crispin Crandall (No. 86)"
2015	Mr. Robot	Interviewer	
2015	Secret Diaries of a Terrorist	Seventh Wife	Ep 1
2005	All My Children	Campaign Worker	
2004	As the World Turns	Flight Passenger	
