= The Amityville Harvest =

2020 film by Thomas J. Churchill

- Poster
- Directed by: Thomas J. Churchill
- Written by: Thomas J. Churchill
- Produced by: Thomas J. Churchill; Steven Louis Goldenberg; Phillip B. Goldfine
- Starring: Kyle Lowder; Sadie Katz; Brandon Alan Smith; Alexa Pellerin; Johanna Rae; Michael Cervantes; Eva Ceja; George W. Scott; Keavy Bradley; Yan Birch; Eileen Dietz
- Cinematography: David M. Parks
- Edited by: Rudolf Buitendach; Daniel Murray
- Music by: Erick Schroder
- Production company: Church Hill Productions
- Distributed by: Lionsgate Home Entertainment
- Release date: October 20, 2020
- Running time: 93 minutes
- Country: United States
- Language: English

The Amityville Harvest is a 2020 supernatural horror film written and directed by Thomas J. Churchill. The film stars Kyle Lowder, Sadie Katz, Brandon Alan Smith and Alexa Pellerin. It is the final film in the Amityville Horror film series to be released before the death of the inspiration for the series, the real-life mass murderer, Ronald DeFeo Jr., who died on March 12, 2021.

== Plot ==
A documentary crew follows Vincent Miller, a strange figure with powers.

== Cast ==
- Kyle Lowder as Vincent Miller
- Sadie Katz as Christina
- Brandon Alan Smith as Cosmo
- Alexa Pellerin as Nancy
- Johanna Rae as Janet
- Michael Cervantes as Scratch
- Eva Ceja as Lexy
- George W. Scott as Ottis
- Keavy Bradley as Lana
- Yan Birch as Clyde Barrott
- Eileen Dietz as Mrs. O'Brian
- Paul Logan as Robbie

== Release ==
The film released on October 20, 2020, on DVD, VOD and Digital.

== Reception ==
Screen Rant said the twist did not work because the movie focused on the what instead of why. Common Sense Media calls it a "a bad movie, but it could be a good-bad movie with [...] low expectations." Nightmarish Conjurings said the editing was chaotic and the special effects were poor. Horror Society scored it 1 out of 5. In a more favorable review, Cryptic Rock rated it 3 out of 5.
