= Touch (2022 film) =

2022 film by Justin Burquist

- Poster
- Directed by: Justin Burquist
- Written by: Justin Burquist
- Produced by: Evette Betancourt; Christopher Holloway
- Starring: Eva Ceja; Randy Davison; Steve Froehlich; Nick Young; Jayce Venditti; Ron Christopher Jones
- Cinematography: Ray Gallardo
- Edited by: Fernando Garcia
- Music by: Matthew Gradala
- Production companies: Broken Swing Productions; Gemini Pictures; Gray Area Multimedia
- Distributed by: Klipist
- Release dates: November 20, 2022 (LA Crime & Horror Film Festival); May 22, 2024 (Klipist)
- Running time: 8 minutes
- Country: United States
- Language: English
- Budget: $10,000

Touch is a 2022 crime horror short film written and directed by Justin Burquist. The film stars Eva Ceja, Randy Davison, Steve Froehlich and Nick Young.

The film received positive reviews from critics and won Best Horror Short Film at Berlin Short Film Festival, nominated for Best Art Direction at Oceanside International Film Festival, and screened at Monster Fest and the San Diego Comic-Con Independent Film Festival.

== Plot ==
Homicide police bring in a mysterious woman with a supernatural ability to help them solve a gruesome murder.

== Cast ==
- Eva Ceja as Carmen
- Randy Davison as Victim
- Steve Froehlich as Killer
- Nick Young as Detective Hooper
- Jayce Venditti as Deputy Smith
- Ron Christopher Jones as Deputy O'Neal

== Production ==
Justin Burquist used the film's technique on a previous music video and said the film is influenced by Se7en and Brian De Palma. Principal photography took place at Gray Area Multimedia in downtown San Diego in 2021. John Menvielle helped with sound recording, visual effects and editing. Jayce Venditti and Ron Christopher Jones were also cast in the film. It was made for a $10,000 budget.

== Release ==
The film premiered at Los Angeles Crime & Horror Film Festival on November 20, 2022. It screened at Monster Fest with Matthew Holmes' The Cost, Berlin Short Film Festival, Oceanside International Film Festival and Comic-Con International Independent Film Festival.

It was distributed by Klipist on May 22, 2024.

== Reception ==
=== Critical response ===
Rebecca Cherry at Film Carnage praised Ceja's performance and said the film was "a captivating, mysterious blend of crime thriller and horror," scoring it 8 out of 10. Mac Brewer at Horror Society scored it 4 out of 5 noting they "would love to see this further explored or redone into a feature film" because it is "a unique crime thriller/horror tale that has so much more potential." Simon Thompson at Bloody Flicks praised the film, saying it was "visually captivating, and striking in its originality." Adam La Rosa at Monster Fest said the film was "interesting and mind-bending."

=== Accolades ===
Festival	Year	Award	Recipient(s)	Result	Ref.
Los Angeles Crime & Horror Film Festival	2022	Best Editing	Fernando A. Garcia	Won	
Berlin Short Film Festival	2023	Best Horror Short Film: Audience Award	Evette Betancourt, Justin Burquist, Christopher Holloway	Won	
Oceanside International Film Festival	2023	Best Art Direction	Nicole Valencia	Nominated	
San Diego Film Awards	2023	Best Narrative Short Film	Evette Betancourt, Justin Burquist, Christopher Holloway	Won	
San Diego Film Awards	2023	Best Sound Design	Joe Godfrey	Won	
San Diego Film Awards	2023	Best Director	Justin Burquist	Nominated	
San Diego Film Awards	2023	Best Lead Actress	Eva Ceja	Nominated	
San Diego Film Awards	2023	Best Cinematography	Ray Gallardo	Nominated	
San Diego Film Awards	2023	Best Editing	Fernando Garcia	Nominated	
San Diego Film Awards	2023	Best Production Design	Nicole Valencia	Nominated	
San Diego Film Awards	2023	Best Visual Effects	John Menvielle	Nominated	
Brightside Tavern Film Festival	2024	Best Director Horror/Thriller	Justin Burquist	Nominated	
Brightside Tavern Film Festival	2024	Best Horror/Thriller	Touch	Nominated	
Brightside Tavern Film Festival	2024	Best Concept	Touch	Nominated	
