= Eva Ceja =

American actress and line producer (born 1983)

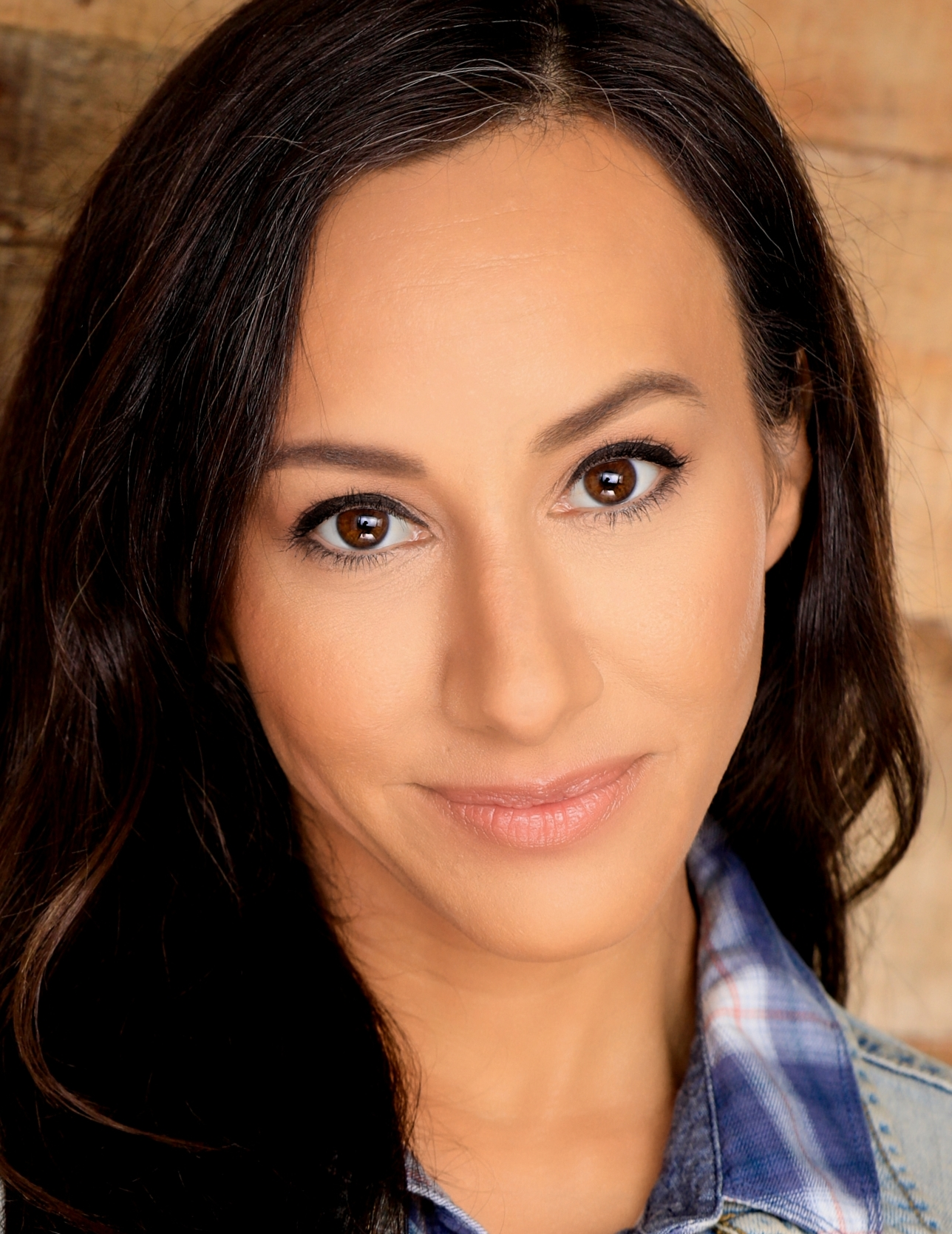
- Ceja in 2021
- Born: Alejandra Eva Ceja; December 23, 1983 (age 42); Fort Lewis, Washington, U.S.
- Occupations: Actress; line producer
- Years active: 2003–present
- Known for: Aquarium of the Dead; Doomsday Meteor; Kung Fu Slayers; Moon Crash; Touch
- Website: evaceja.com

Alejandra Eva Ceja (born 23 December 1983) is an American actress and line producer.

== Career ==
Ceja is best known for her roles in the films The Amityville Harvest (2020), Aquarium of the Dead (2021) and Touch (2022), the latter for which she was nominated for a best actress award at the San Diego Film Awards in 2023. A graduate of the Royal Academy of Dramatic Arts and The Second City Conservatory, she has performed at the Edinburgh Festival Fringe, and has line produced films for The Asylum, BET, and Tubi.

== Filmography ==
=== Feature films ===
Year	Title	Role	Notes
2004	Owenstory	Josie	
2011	Within: Terror Resides...	Jackie	
2014	Aftermath	Unidentifiable Victim	
2016	Monumental	Elizabeth	
2016	Best Thanksgiving Ever	Gweedy Girl at Gym	
2017	Newness	Nicole Cartwright	
2017	The Lurking Man	Orthon Double	
2017	Visage	Kitty	
2019	Nation's Fire	Lexi	
2019	Shorts in A Bunch: Summer Breakout	Various Roles (voice)	
2020	The Amityville Harvest	Lexy	
2021	Aquarium of the Dead	Miranda Riley	
2022	Moon Crash	Dominique	
2022	Titanic 666	Newscaster	
2022	4 Horsemen: Apocalypse	Dakota Lenna	
2022	The Wedding Pact 2: The Baby Pact	Julie	
2022	Thor: God of Thunder	Halstein	
2022	Hall Pass Nightmare	Colleague	TV movie
2022	American Bigfoot	Nada	
2022	Last Chance	District Attorney Franks	
2023	Blossom	Lauren	
2023	Doomsday Meteor	Williams	
2024	Inheritance	Mary	
2024	The Devil You Become	Veronica	
2024	Lick	Pam	
2025	Hard Justice	Grace Thompson	
2025	Kung Fu Slayers	Zara	
2026	Night of the Rising Dead	Judy	

=== Short films ===
Year	Title	Role
2011	In a Room	Sally
2013	Promised	Mariella
2013	Broken Knuckles	Lydia
2013	24 After	Koi
2013	An Empty Lot	Woman
2015	Stick to the Weather	Ashley
2015	Prom	Kelsey
2015	God's Plan	Kayla
2015	Happy	Happy
2016	The Opening Seat	Katie
2016	One Year	Jen
2016	Group Date Disaster	Eva
2016	Double Reveal	Krissa
2016	Warrior of Eclipse	Maria
2016	Birth of a Nation and Chill	Michelle
2016	The Refusal Scene	Geena
2016	The Last Goodbye	-
2016	The Exemption	Sarah
2016	Crash	Toni
2017	He's Got Baggage	Emma
2018	The Source	Zoe Rodriguez
2018	Warrior Spirit	Robin Neal
2018	Where We Grew	Stacey N.
2018	Midnight to One	Victoria
2019	Let the Dead Bury the Dead	Gloria
2020	West to Midwest	Marge
2022	Cabin	Layla
2022	Hall Pass Nightmare	Colleague
2022	Touch	Carmen
2023	Cup of Roommate	Amanda
2023	The Extras	Catherine

=== Television ===
Year	Title	Role	Notes
2013	Golden California	Natalie	Episode: "Summer in the City"
2013	Hello Ladies	Scorsese Actress	Episode: "The Date"
2014	Unusual Suspects	Susan Schumake	Episode: "Dead End Trail"
2014	Breakfast Buddies	Michelle	Episode: "Late for Work"
2015	Sex Sent Me to the ER	Maria	Episode: "5 Times & No Fun"
2015	Barfly	Laura	Recurring Cast: Season 2
2015	The Couch Chronicles	Sophia	Episode: "ABC Party"
2015	Geek Haven	Brooke Dexar	Episode: "Welcome to Geek Haven!"
2016	Last Man Standing	Tattoo Artist	Episode: "Tattoo"
2016	Sportz Night	Moth	Episode: "Duncan Retires"
2016	Crazy Ex-Girlfriend	Tessa	Episode: "Who Needs Josh When You Have a Girl Group?"
2018	Not For Nothin'	Lexi	Recurring Cast
2018	S.W.A.T.	Julie Reeves	Episode: "S.O.S."
2020	Last Chance	D.A. Franks	Recurring Cast
2021	iCarly	Kimmi	Episode: "iRobot Wedding"
2021-22	If Superheroes Were Real	Various Roles (voice)	Recurring Cast

=== Music video ===
Year	Song	Artist	Role
2018	"The Storm"	Kristine Rommel	Orthon

=== Video game ===
Year	Game	Role
2022	As Dusk Falls	Ash Walema
