= List of people from California =

State flag of California

Location of California in the United States

The notable people from the U.S. state of California listed here include those who were born and raised in, lived in, or spent portions of their lives in California, or for whom California is a significant part of their identity.

== 0 to 9 ==
- 12th Planet – record producer and DJ
- 24hrs – rapper
- 24kGoldn – rapper
- 2Mex – rapper

== A ==
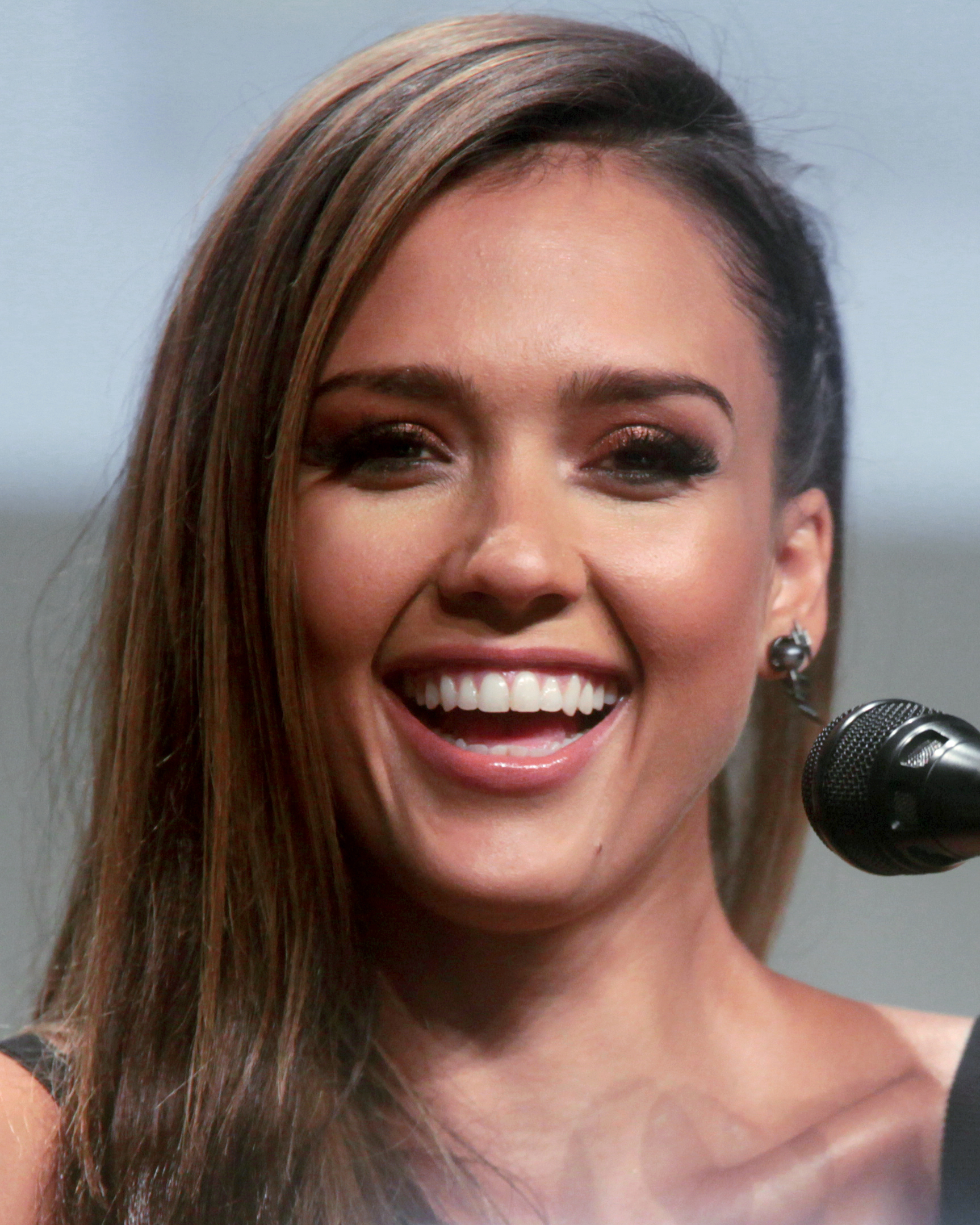
Jessica Alba

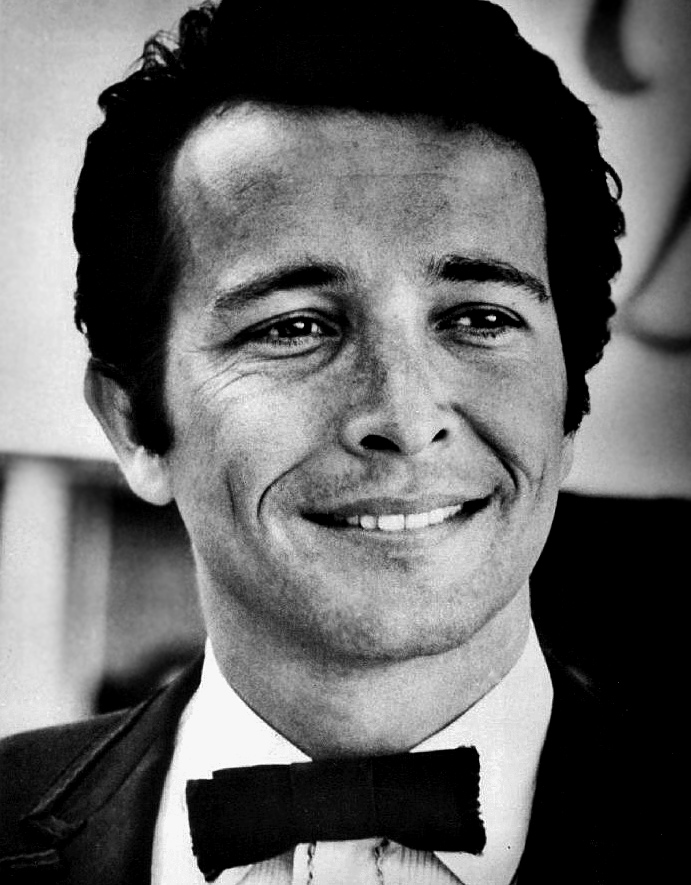
Herb Alpert

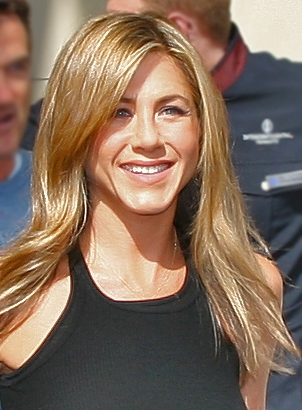
Jennifer Aniston

- Willie Aames – actor
- Stephen Abas – Olympic freestyle wrestler
- Paula Abdul – singer and dancer, American Idol panelist
- Abby Abinanti – California’s first Native American female lawyer
- Gracie Abrams – singer
- Rosalie Abrams – playwright, actress, and activist
- Beth Accomando – film critic, arts reporter, and podcast host
- Ansel Adams – photographer
- Davante Adams – NFL wide receiver
- Jay Adams – skateboarder and surfer
- Erik Affholter (born 1966), NFL wide receiver
- Ben Affleck – Academy Award–winning actor and director
- Ángela Aguilar – Mexican-American singer
- Jhene Aiko – singer
- Jessica Alba – actress and model
- Edward Albert – actor
- Jon Allen – voice and film actor (Rick and Morty)
- Josh Allen – NFL quarterback (Buffalo Bills)
- Keegan Allen – actor (Pretty Little Liars)
- Marcus Allen – football player
- A. J. Allmendinger – NASCAR driver
- Herb Alpert – trumpeter and music executive
- Bobbi Althoff – podcaster
- Tony Alva – skateboarder and surfer
- Caroline Amiguet – actress and model (Love All You Have Left)
- Helen Andelin – author (Fascinating Womanhood)
- Anthony Anderson – actor
- Melissa Sue Anderson – actress
- Paul Thomas Anderson – filmmaker
- Tom Anderson – co-founder of the social network MySpace
- Jennifer Aniston – actress (Friends)
- Odette Annable – actress
- Kenzie Anne – actress
- Maude Apatow – actress (Euphoria)
- apl.de.ap – Filipino-American rapper, singer and record producer (Black Eyed Peas)
- Shiri Appleby – actress and film director (Roswell)
- Christina Applegate – actress
- Jon Appleton – composer
- Anne Archer – actress
- Eve Arden – actress
- Billie Joe Armstrong – musician, guitarist, and vocalist (Green Day)
- Lucie Arnaz – actress
- Genevieve Artadi – musician and singer-songwriter
- Maureen Arthur – actress (How to Succeed in Business Without Really Trying)
- Reginald "Fieldy" Arvizu – bassist (Korn)
- Ashe – singer
- Sean Astin – actor (The Goonies, The Lord of the Rings)
- Jeff Atkinson – distance runner and Olympian
- Mark Atkinson – film actor and producer (Pulp Friction)
- Coco Austin – television personality
- Tracy Austin – tennis player
- Dylan Axelrod – baseball player

== B ==
=== Ba–Bm ===
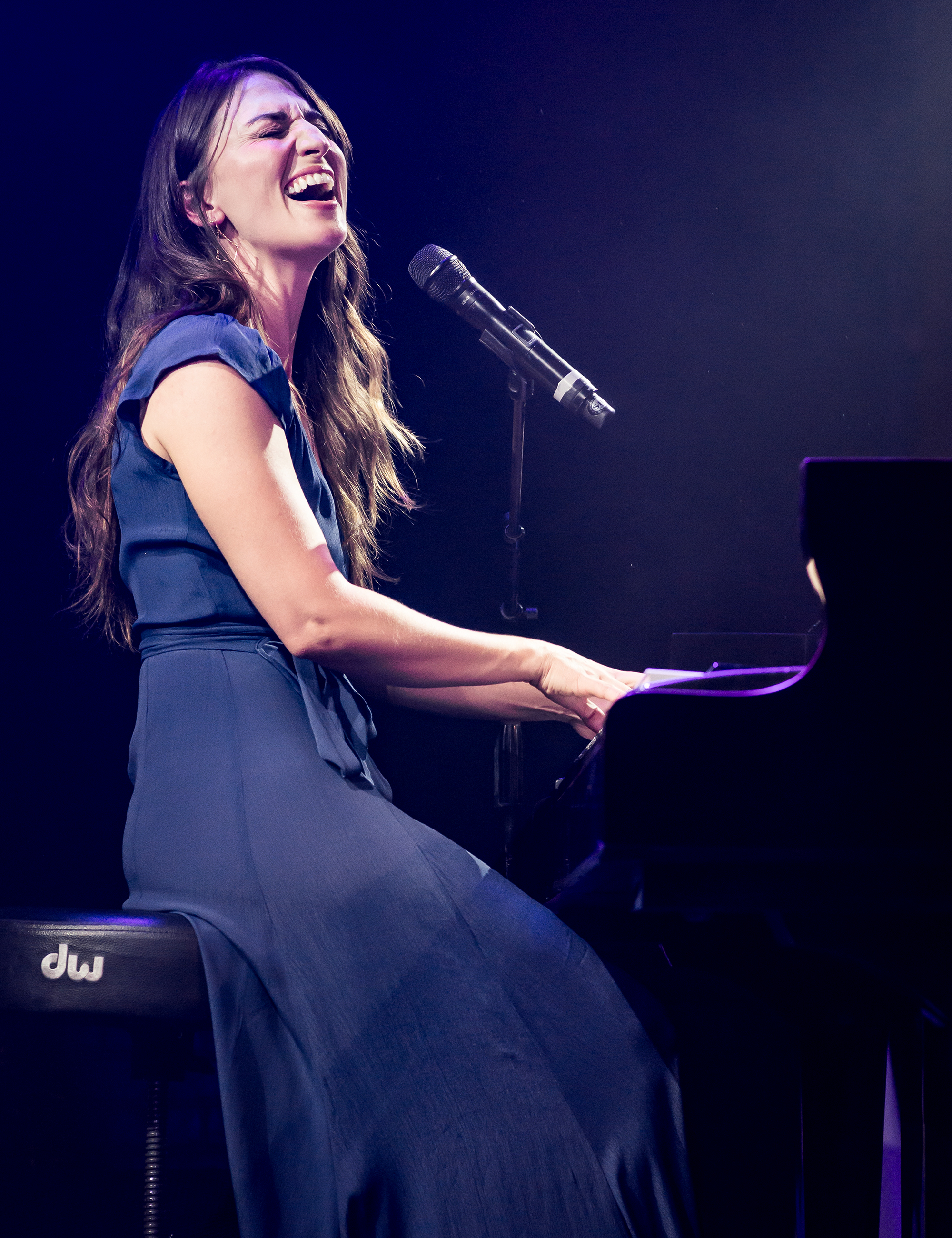
Sara Bareilles

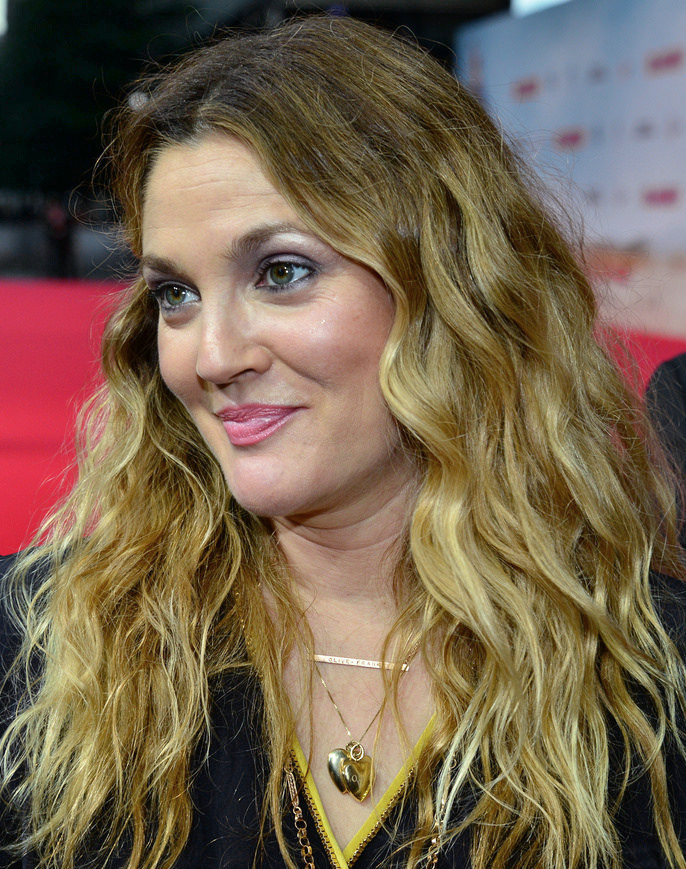
Drew Barrymore

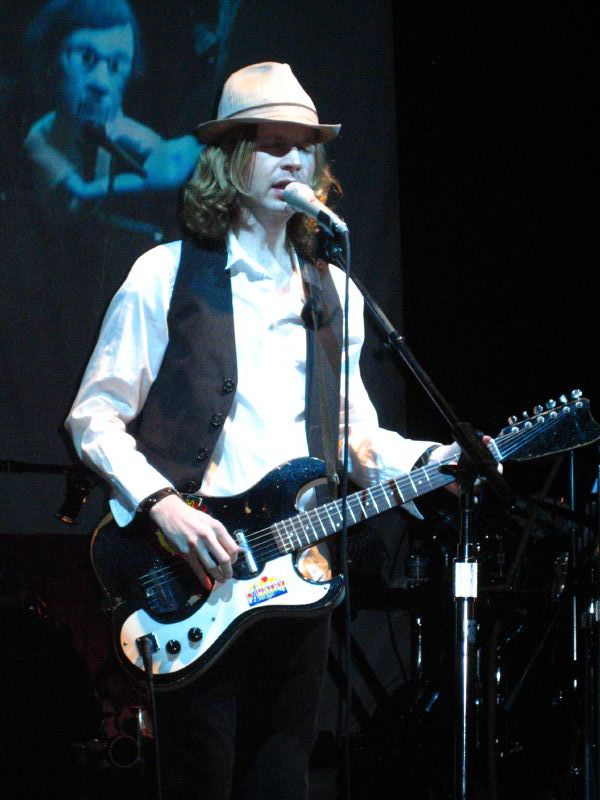
Beck

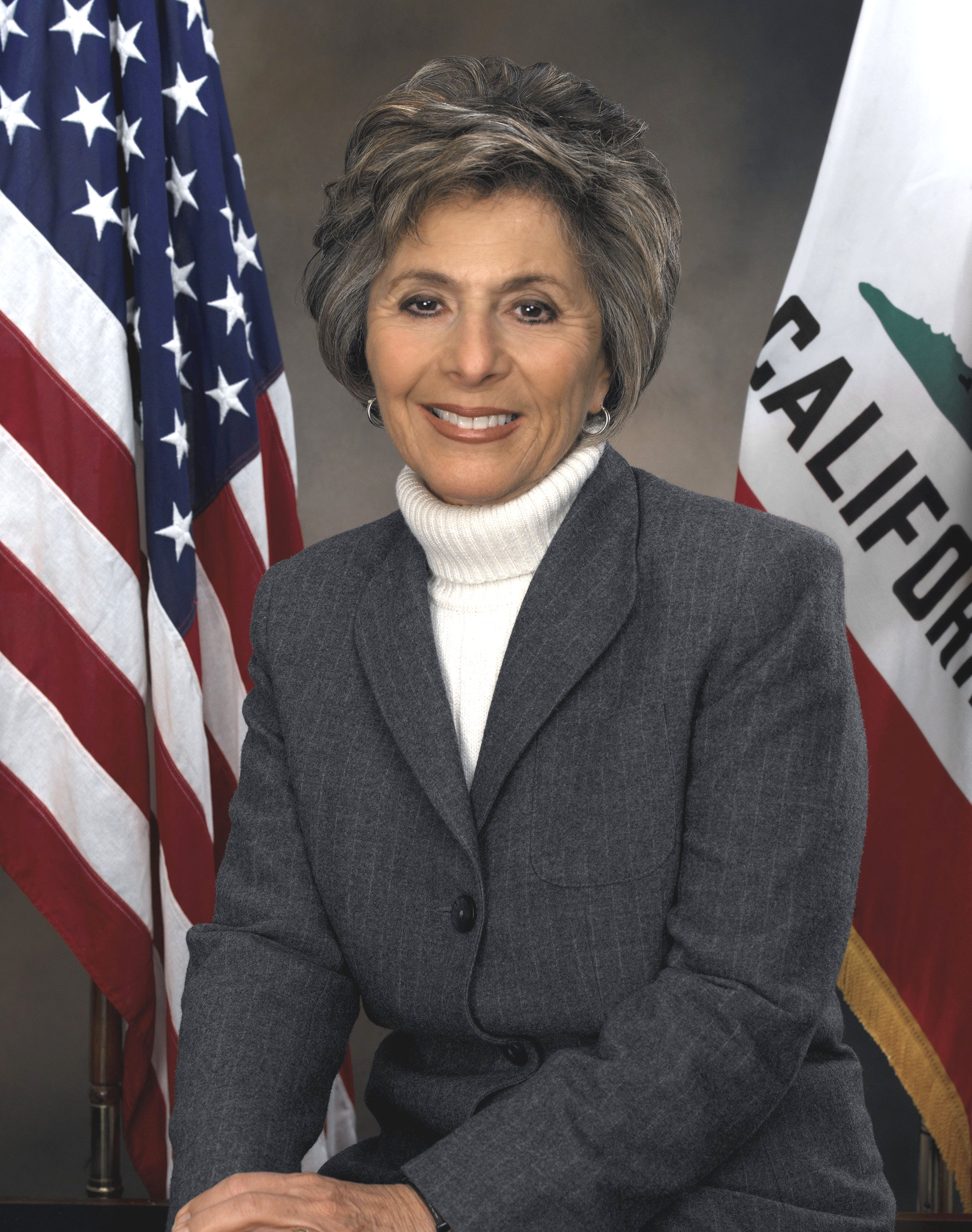
Barbara Boxer

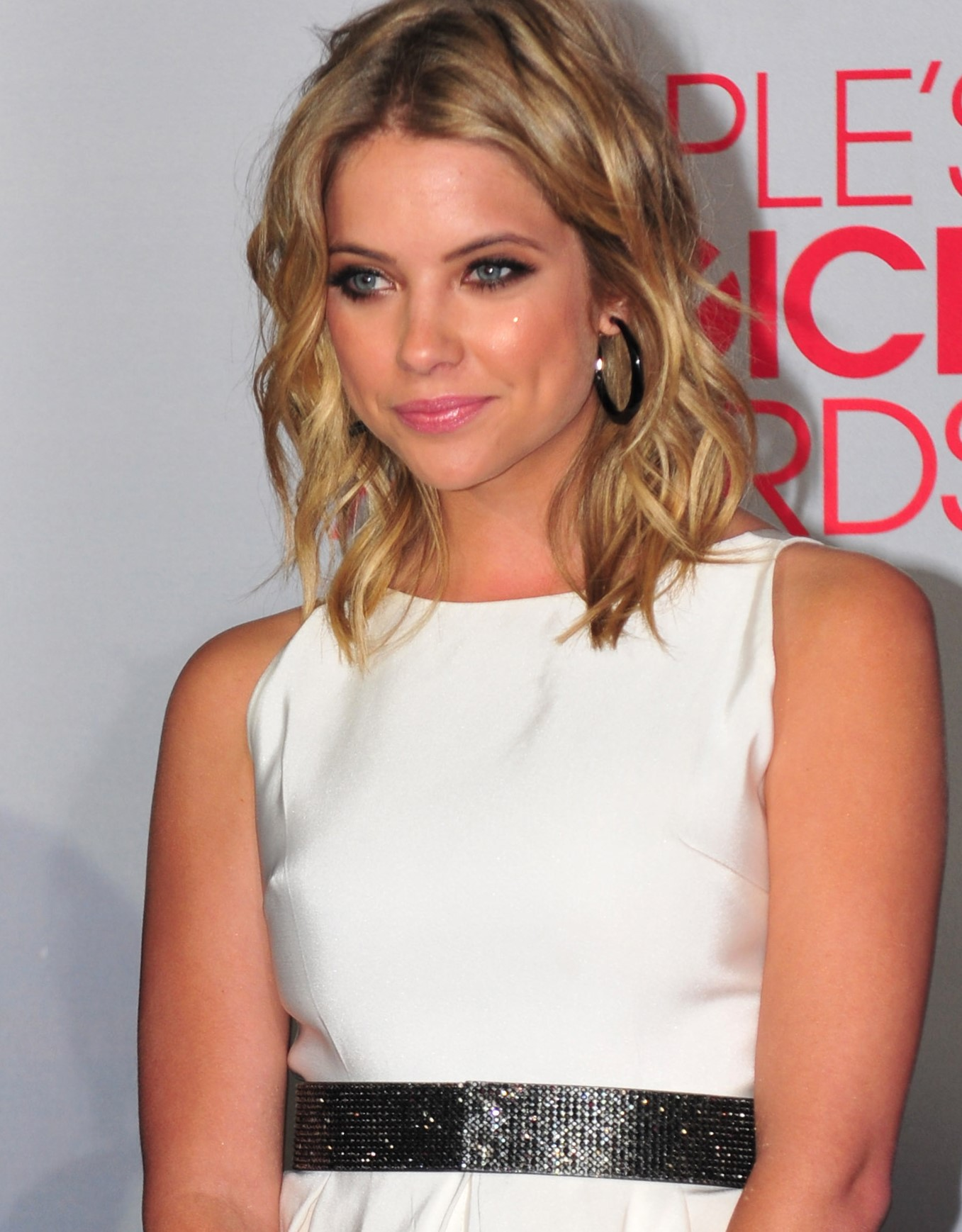
Ashley Benson

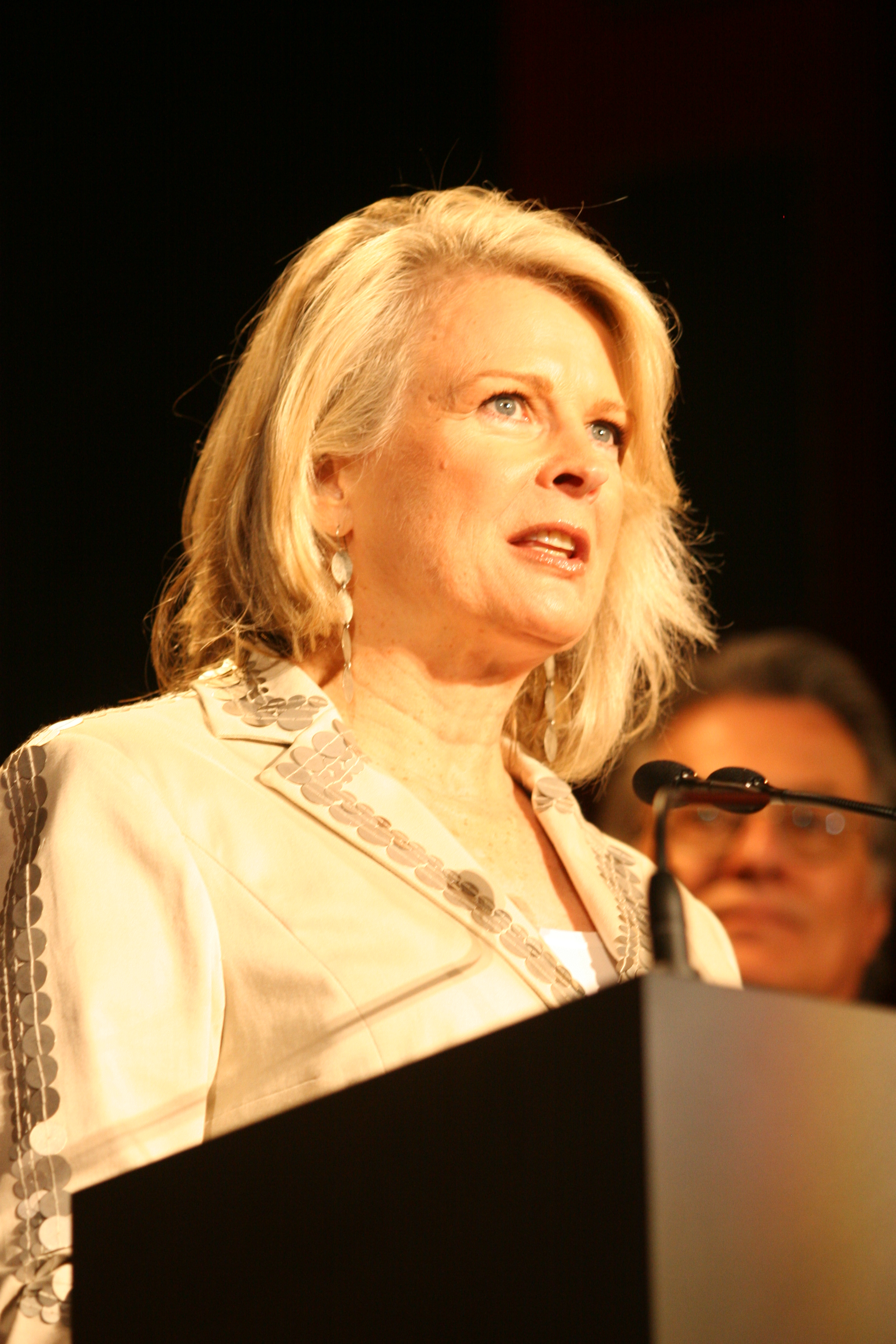
Candice Bergen

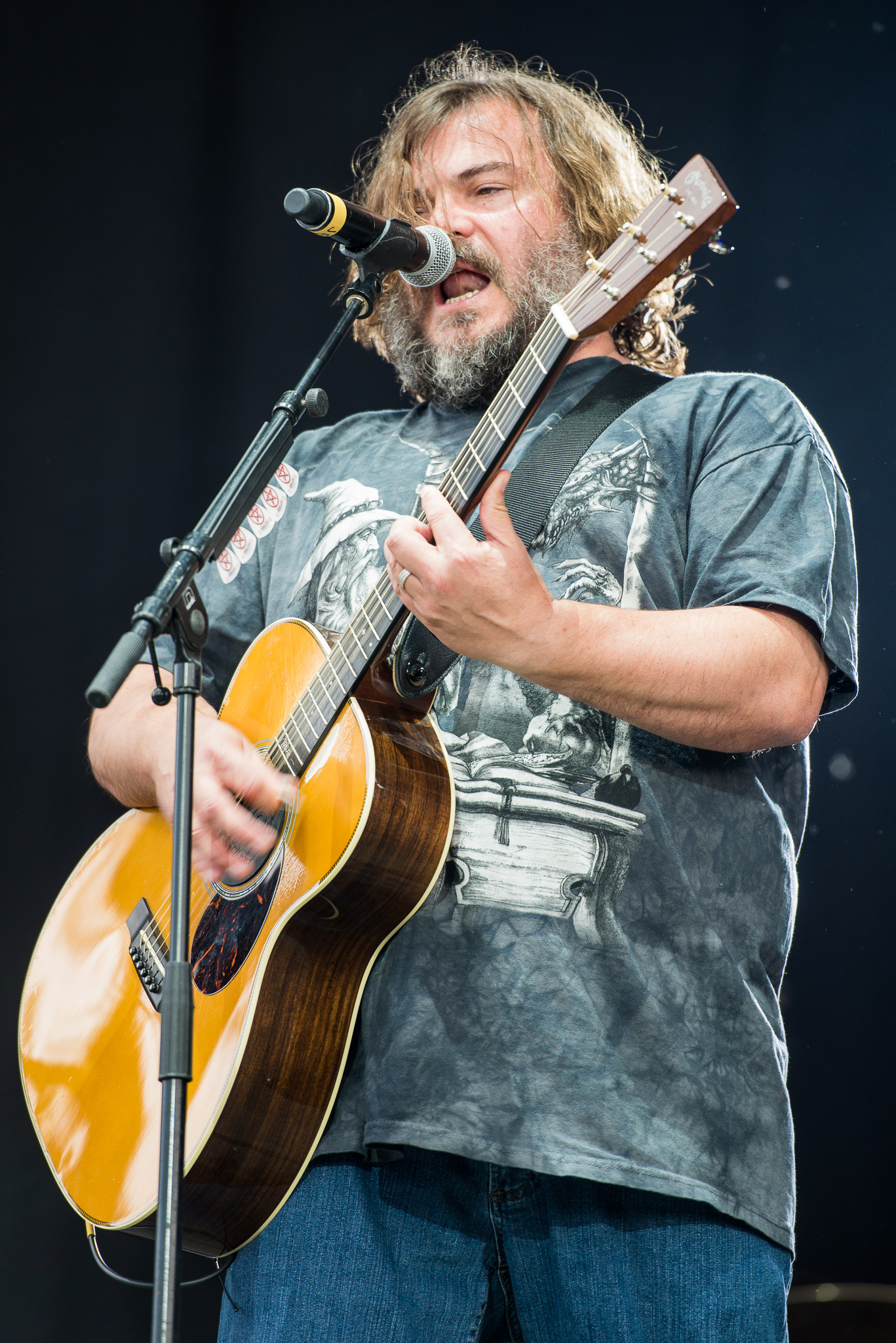
Jack Black

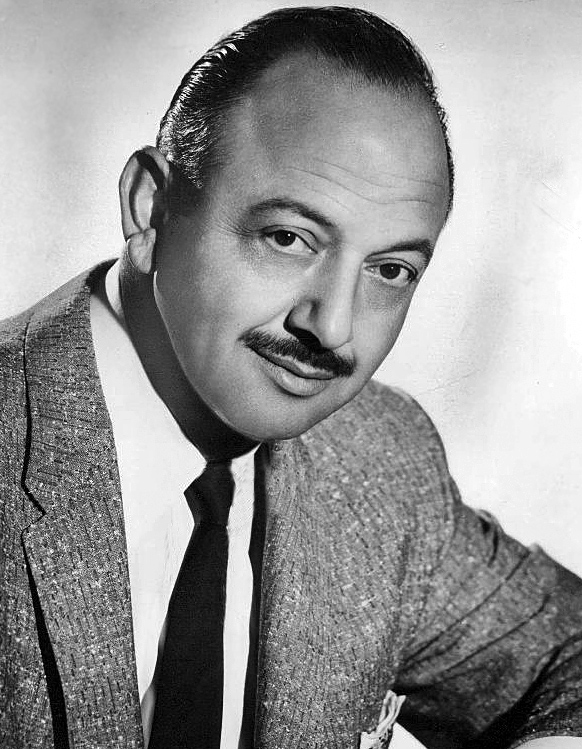
Mel Blanc

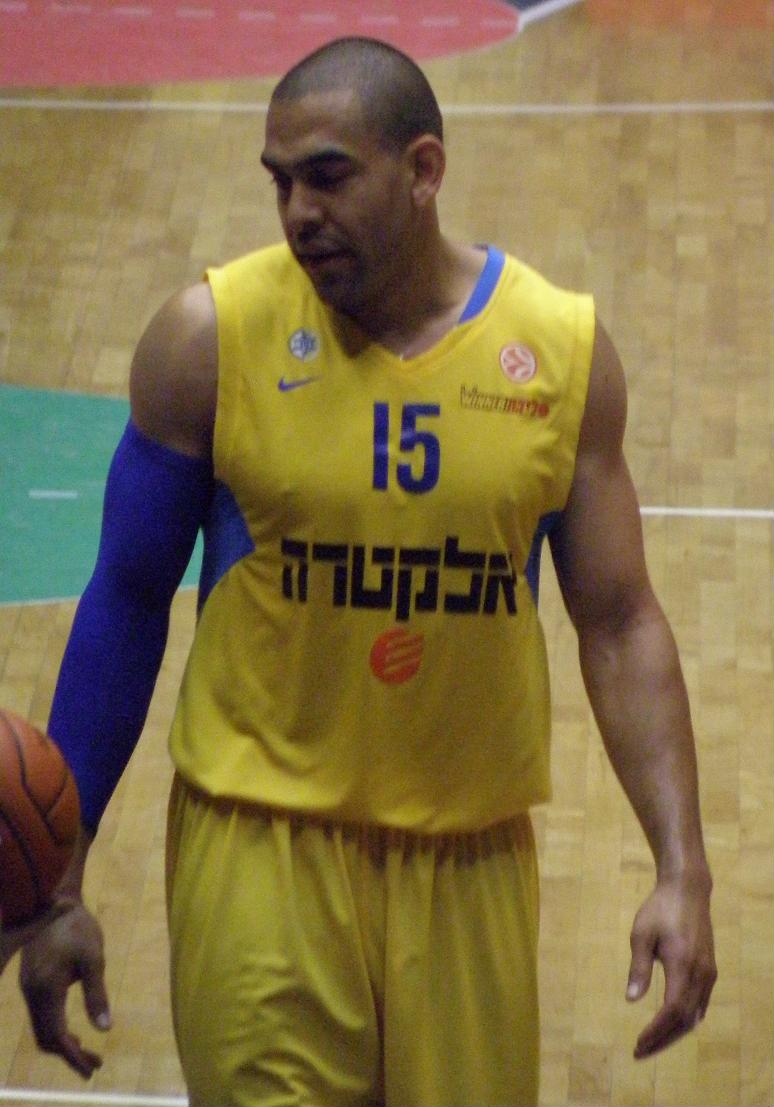
David Bluthenthal

- Lil B – rapper
- B-Real (born 1970) – rapper
- Karl Backus – actor (Thane of East County)
- Emily Bader – actress
- Max Baer Jr. – actor (Jethro Bodine of The Beverly Hillbillies)
- Ross Bagdasarian Sr. – actor (Alvin and the Chipmunks)
- Amari Bailey (born 2004) – NBA basketball guard (Charlotte Hornets)
- Chauncey Bailey – journalist assassinated by an agent of Your Black Muslim Bakery
- Diane Baker – actress (The Silence of the Lambs)
- Dusty Baker – Major League Baseball player and manager
- David Bakhtiari – NFL offensive tackle
- Justin Baldoni – actor and filmmaker
- Ireland Baldwin – model
- Cutcha Risling Baldy – professor
- Fairuza Balk – actress
- LaMelo Ball – basketball player (Charlotte Hornets)
- LiAngelo Ball – basketball player
- Lonzo Ball – professional basketball guard (Cleveland Cavaliers)
- Maria Bamford – actress and stand-up comedian
- Banks – singer
- Tyra Banks – model and actress (The Fresh Prince of Bel-Air)
- Ronald Barak (born 1943) – Olympic gymnast
- Adrienne Barbeau – actress (Maude)
- Andrea Barber – actress (Full House)
- Sara Bareilles – singer
- Alabama Barker – internet personality
- Travis Barker – drummer (Blink-182)
- Matt Barnes – National Basketball Association player
- Orr Barouch – Israeli soccer player
- Tara Lynne Barr – actress
- Drew Barrymore – actress (E.T. the Extra-Terrestrial, Never Been Kissed, The Drew Barrymore Show)
- Judith Barsi – actress and voiceover artist
- Kate Bartholomew – fashion designer
- Summer Bartholomew – Miss USA 1975
- Dante Basco – actor
- Earl W. Bascom – rodeo pioneer, Hall of Fame inductee, actor, international artist, and sculptor
- Baby Bash – rapper
- Ellen Bass – poet and author
- Bassnectar – musician and record producer
- Max Baucus – politician, congressman (1975–78), U.S. senator from Montana (1978–2014), and U.S. ambassador to China (2014–17)
- Emma Pow Bauder – evangelist
- Michelle Bauer – actress
- Michael Bay – film director
- Amanda Beard – Olympic swimmer
- Beck – musician
- Captain Beefheart – musician
- Ed Begley Jr. – actor and activist
- Drake Bell – actor, comedian, and singer (Drake & Josh)
- Glen Bell – entrepreneur who founded Taco Bell
- Stephania Bell – ESPN analyst and physical therapist
- Camilla Belle – actress
- Tory Belleci – filmmaker and model maker (MythBusters)
- Troian Bellisario – actress and singer (Pretty Little Liars)
- Hester A. Benedict (1838–1921), president, Pacific Coast Women's Press Association
- Marcus Benjamin – early biographer at Smithsonian Institution
- Beau Bennett – hockey player
- Lizet Benrey – painter, actress and film director
- Ashley Benson – actress (Pretty Little Liars)
- Doug Benson – comedian
- Justin Berfield – actor (Malcolm in the Middle)
- Candice Bergen – actress (Murphy Brown)
- Berner – rapper and cannabis entrepreneur
- Davion Berry (born 1991) – basketball player in the Israeli Basketball Premier League
- Alan Bersin (born 1946) – President Obama's "border czar," US attorney for the Southern District of California, California Secretary of Education, Commissioner of US Customs and Border Protection, US Department of Homeland Security secretary for International Affairs, and INTERPOL vice president
- Carolyn Beug – passenger aboard American Airlines Flight 11
- Yusuf Bey – owner of Your Black Muslim Bakery
- Mayim Bialik – Israeli-American actress (The Big Bang Theory, Blossom) and neuroscientist
- Sergey Bida (born 1993) – Olympic silver medalist épée fencer
- Violetta Khrapina Bida (born 1994) – Olympic épée fencer
- Bighead – record producer
- Barbara Billingsley – actress
- Rachel Bilson – actress (The O.C.)
- Paul Bilzerian (born 1950) – financier convicted of securities fraud
- David Binn – 18-season NFL long snapper
- Ryan Binse – film producer and United States Navy veteran
- Matt Biondi – competitive swimmer and eight-time Olympic gold medalist
- Thora Birch – actress (Hocus Pocus)
- Jake Bird (born 1995) – baseball pitcher for the Colorado Rockies
- Steve Birnbaum – Major League Soccer player
- Bradford Bishop – indicted murderer and at-large fugitive
- Joel Bitonio – NFL offensive guard
- Bill Bixby – actor (The Incredible Hulk)
- Aloe Blacc – singer and musician
- Jack Black – actor and musician (Kung Fu Panda, Tenacious D)
- Rebecca Black – singer
- Tyler Blackburn – actor and singer (Pretty Little Liars)
- Hank Blalock – baseball player (Texas Rangers)
- Mel Blanc – cartoon voice actor
- Rowan Blanchard – actress (Girl Meets World)
- Erica Blasberg (1984–2010) – LPGA golfer
- Sheila Bleck – IFBB professional bodybuilder
- Mel Bleeker (1920–1996) – NFL halfback
- Ken Block – rally driver and gymkhana driver
- Andy Bloom – Olympic shot putter
- Betsy Bloomingdale – socialite
- David Blu (born David Bluthenthal) – professional basketball player (Maccabi Tel Aviv)
- Rora Blue – visual artist
- Blueface – rapper
- Jason Blum – film producer
- Jonathon Blum – hockey player
- Judy Blumberg – competitive ice dancer
- Ann Blyth (1927-2026) - actress and singer

=== Bn–Bz ===
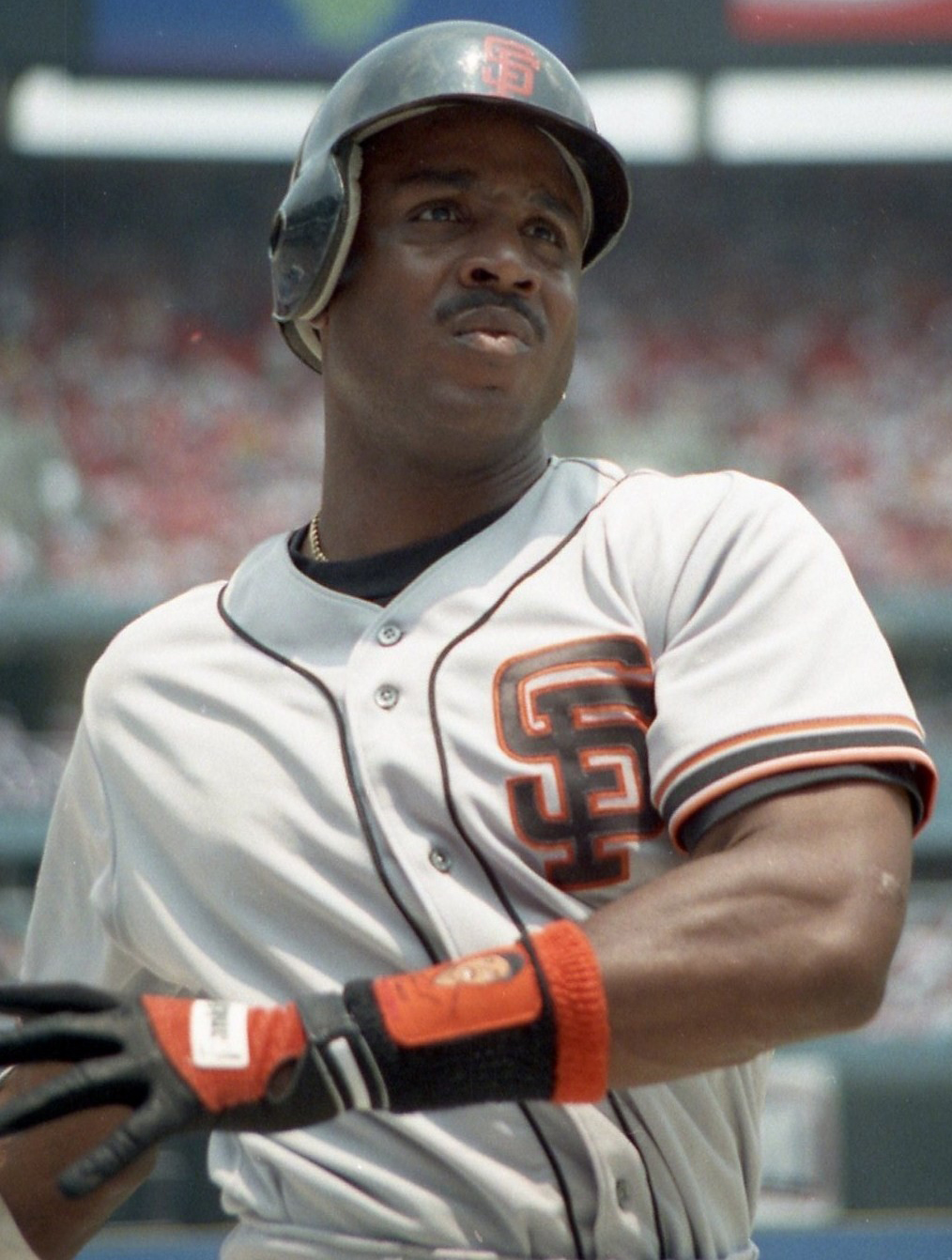
Barry Bonds

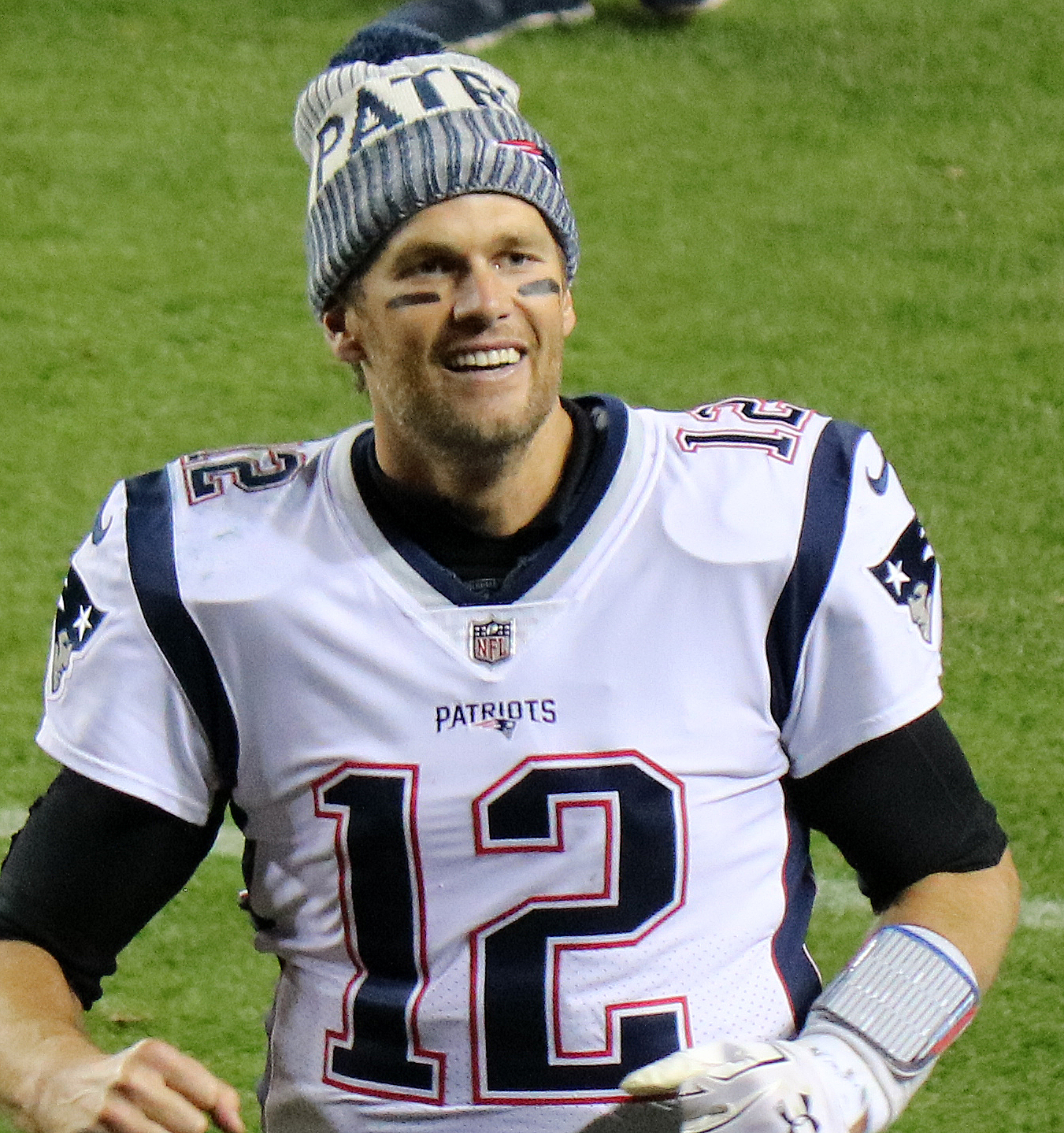
Tom Brady

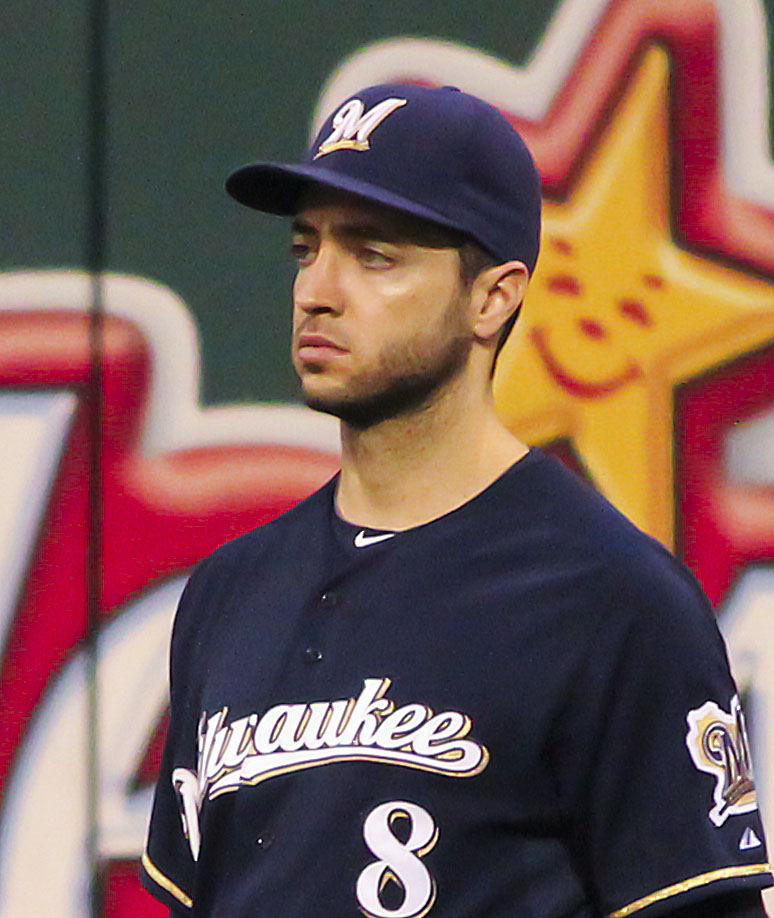
Ryan Braun

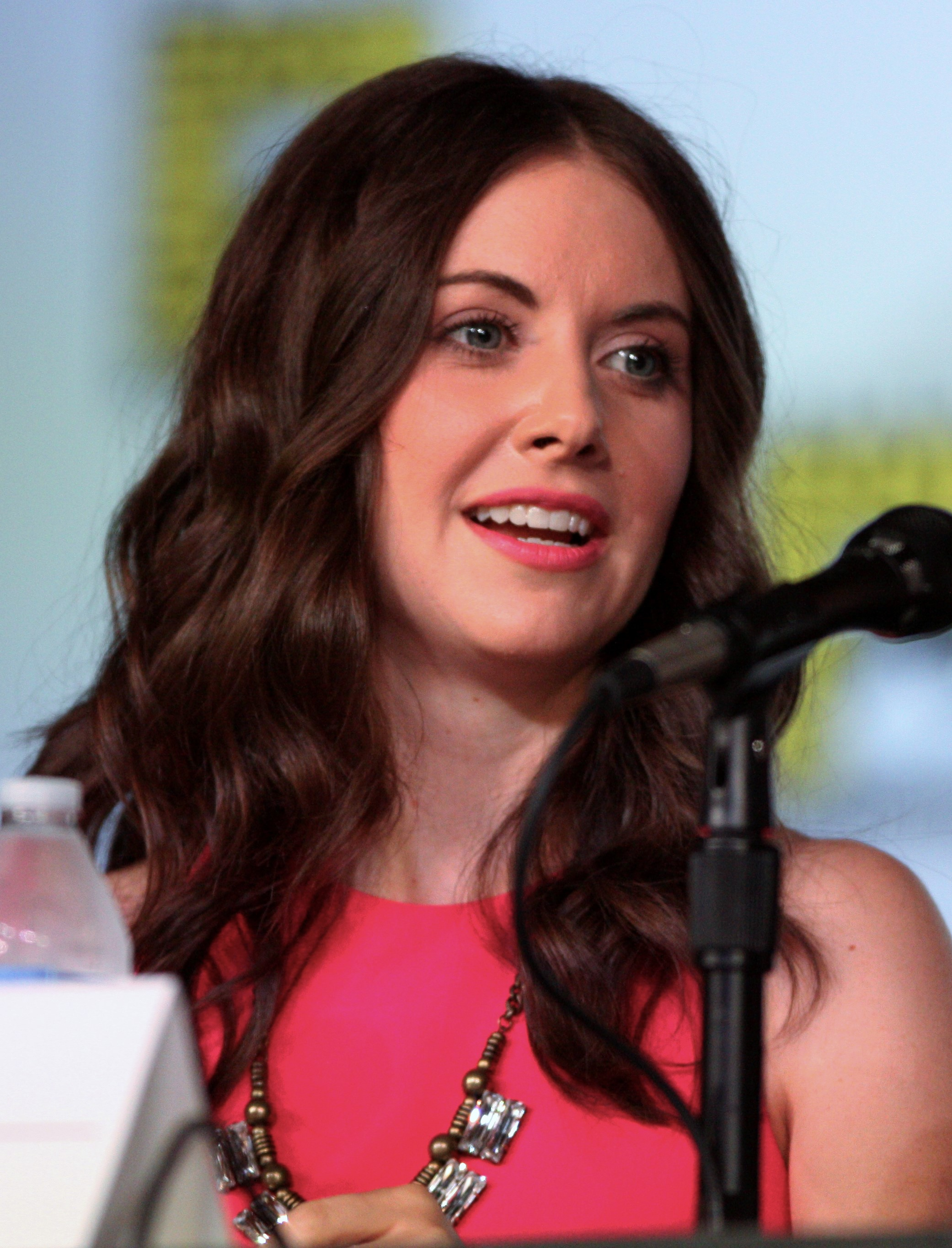
Alison Brie

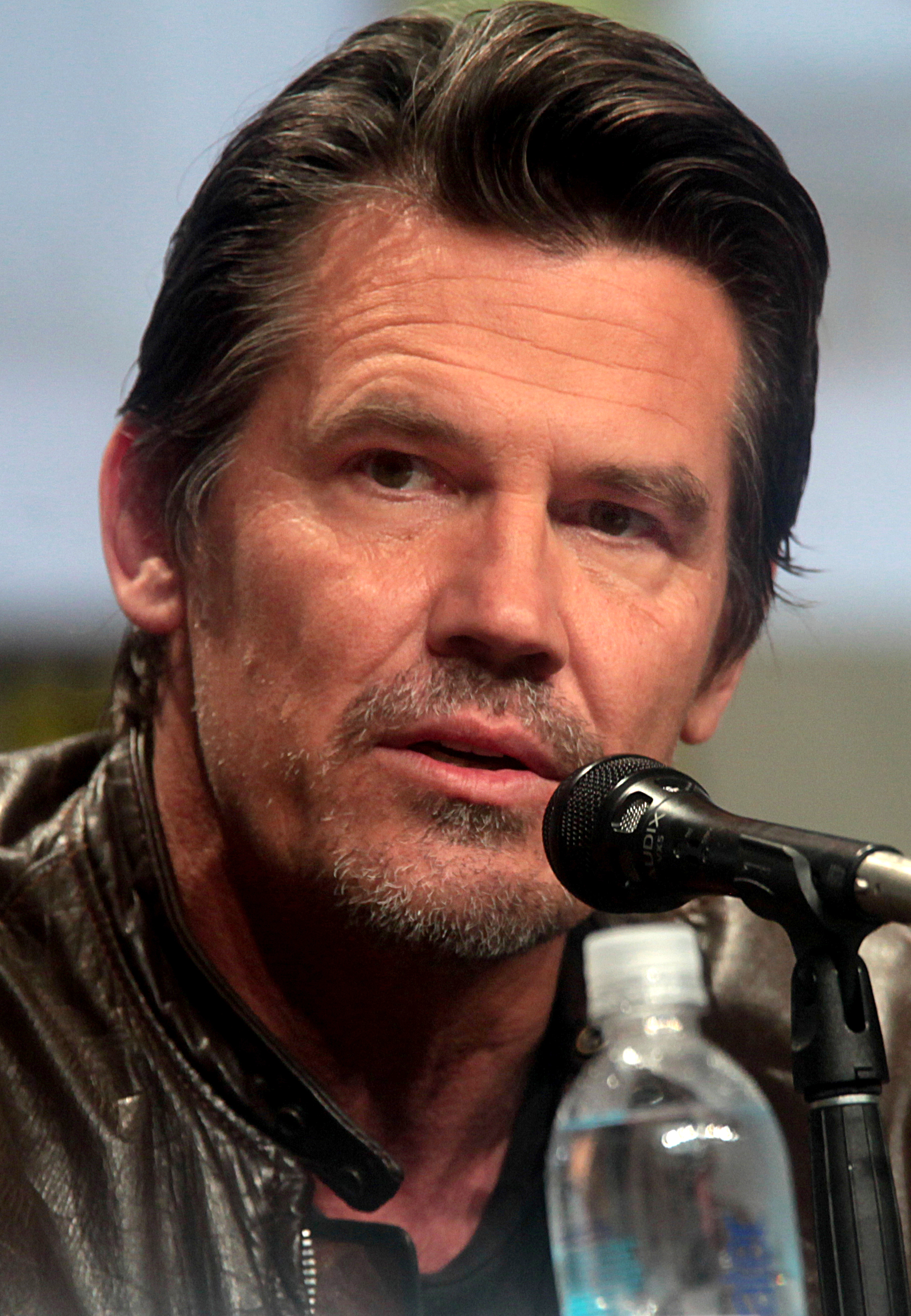
Josh Brolin

- Sam Bohne (born Sam Cohen) – baseball player
- Brian Boitano − Olympic gold medalist (figure skating)
- Ashlee Bond (born 1985) – American-Israeli Olympic show-jumping rider who competes for Israel
- Barry Bonds – baseball player (San Francisco Giants)
- Bobby Bonds – baseball player (San Francisco Giants)
- Chaz Bono – writer
- Aaron Boone – baseball player (Cleveland Indians)
- Scott Borchetta – record executive, entrepreneur, and founder of Big Machine Records
- Jonathan Bornstein – soccer player for USA National Team and Chicago Fire FC
- Cindy Bortz – 1987 World Junior champion figure skater
- Barry Bostwick – actor (The Rocky Horror Picture Show, Spin City)
- Kate Bosworth – actress
- Lo Bosworth – television personality, author, and entrepreneur
- Shmuley Boteach – Orthodox rabbi, radio and television host, and author
- Bruce Bowen – National Basketball Association player (San Antonio Spurs)
- Brandon Bowman – basketball player in the Israeli Liga Artzit
- April Bowlby – actress
- Barbara Boxer – United States Senator from California 1993–2017; United States representative 1983–1993
- Cameron Boyce – actor (Descendants 2)
- Brandon Boyd – singer and musician (Incubus)
- Brittany Boyd – WNBA player
- Timothy Bradley – boxer
- Tom Brady – football quarterback and commentator
- Debbie Bramwell-Washington – IFBB professional bodybuilder
- Benjamin Bratt – actor
- Ryan Braun – baseball player (Milwaukee Brewers)
- Nick Bravin – Olympic foil fencer
- Eddie Bravo – Brazilian jiu-jitsu instructor
- Nicholas Brendon – actor (Buffy the Vampire Slayer)
- Patrick Brennan – actor
- Jan Brewer – governor of Arizona
- Stephen Breyer – associate justice of the Supreme Court of the United States
- Brigita Brezovac – IFBB professional bodybuilder
- Phoebe Bridgers – singer-songwriter
- Beau Bridges – actor (The Fabulous Baker Boys, Stargate SG-1)
- Jeff Bridges – actor (The Big Lebowski, True Grit)
- Lloyd Bridges – actor (Airplane!, Sea Hunt)
- Alison Brie – actress
- Lance Briggs – football player
- Adam Brody – actor (The O.C.)
- James Brolin – actor
- Josh Brolin – actor (Avengers: Infinity War, Avengers: Endgame)
- Albert Brooks – actor and director (Lost in America)
- Alton Brown – television host
- Anthony Brown (born 1992) – basketball player in the Israeli Basketball Premier League
- Carlon Brown – basketball player, 2013–14 top scorer in the Israel Basketball Premier League
- Jerry Brown – governor of California (1975–83; 2011–19) and mayor of Oakland
- Pat Brown – governor of California (1959–1967)
- Vanessa Bryant – philanthropist
- Dave Brubeck – jazz pianist and composer
- Tedy Bruschi – football player
- Lindsey Buckingham – musician (Fleetwood Mac)
- Jeff Buckley – singer-songwriter and guitarist
- Bill Buckner – baseball player
- Don Budge – tennis player
- Candace Cameron Bure – actress (Full House)
- Hunter Burgan – bass player for AFI
- Bobby Burgess – Mouseketeer and dancer for The Lawrence Welk Show
- Michael C. Burgess – actor and poet (Hacksaw)
- Olivia Burnette – actress
- Justin Burquist – filmmaker (Touch)
- Cliff Burton – former Metallica bassist
- Tim Burton – film director
- Reggie Bush – football player
- Shoshana Bush – actress
- Sophia Bush – activist, spokesperson, and actress (Chicago P.D., One Tree Hill)
- Jeanie Buss – sports executive (Los Angeles Lakers and Women of Wrestling)
- Cruz Bustamante – lieutenant governor of California
- Paul Butcher – actor
- Austin Butler – actor and singer
- Brian Patrick Butler – actor and filmmaker (Friend of the World)
- Win Butler – musician and songwriter (Arcade Fire)
- Amanda Bynes – actress
- Kari Byron – artist and television personality (MythBusters)

== C ==
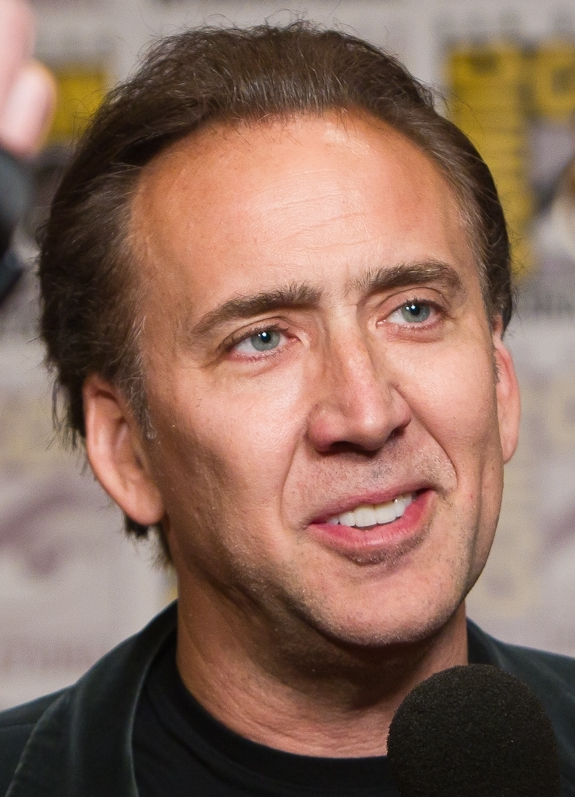
Nicolas Cage

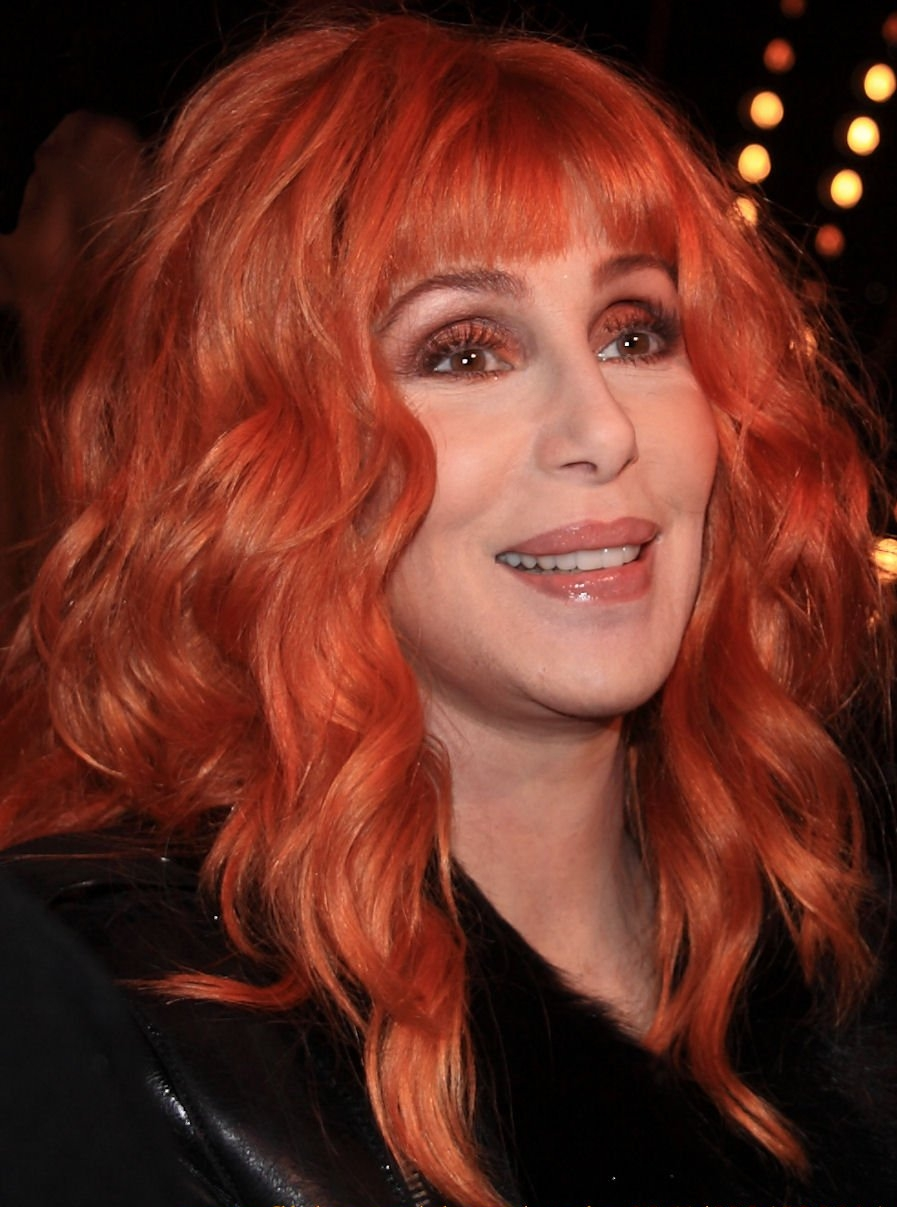
Cher

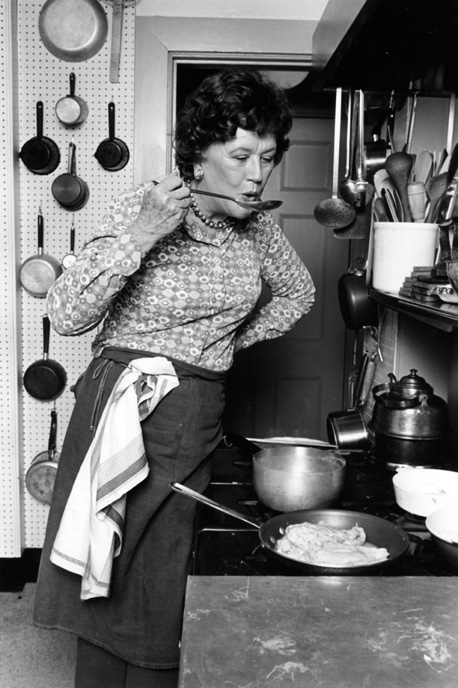
Julia Child

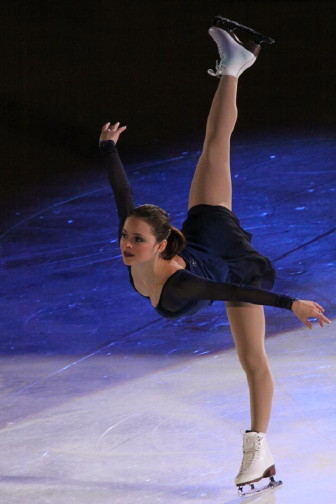
Sasha Cohen

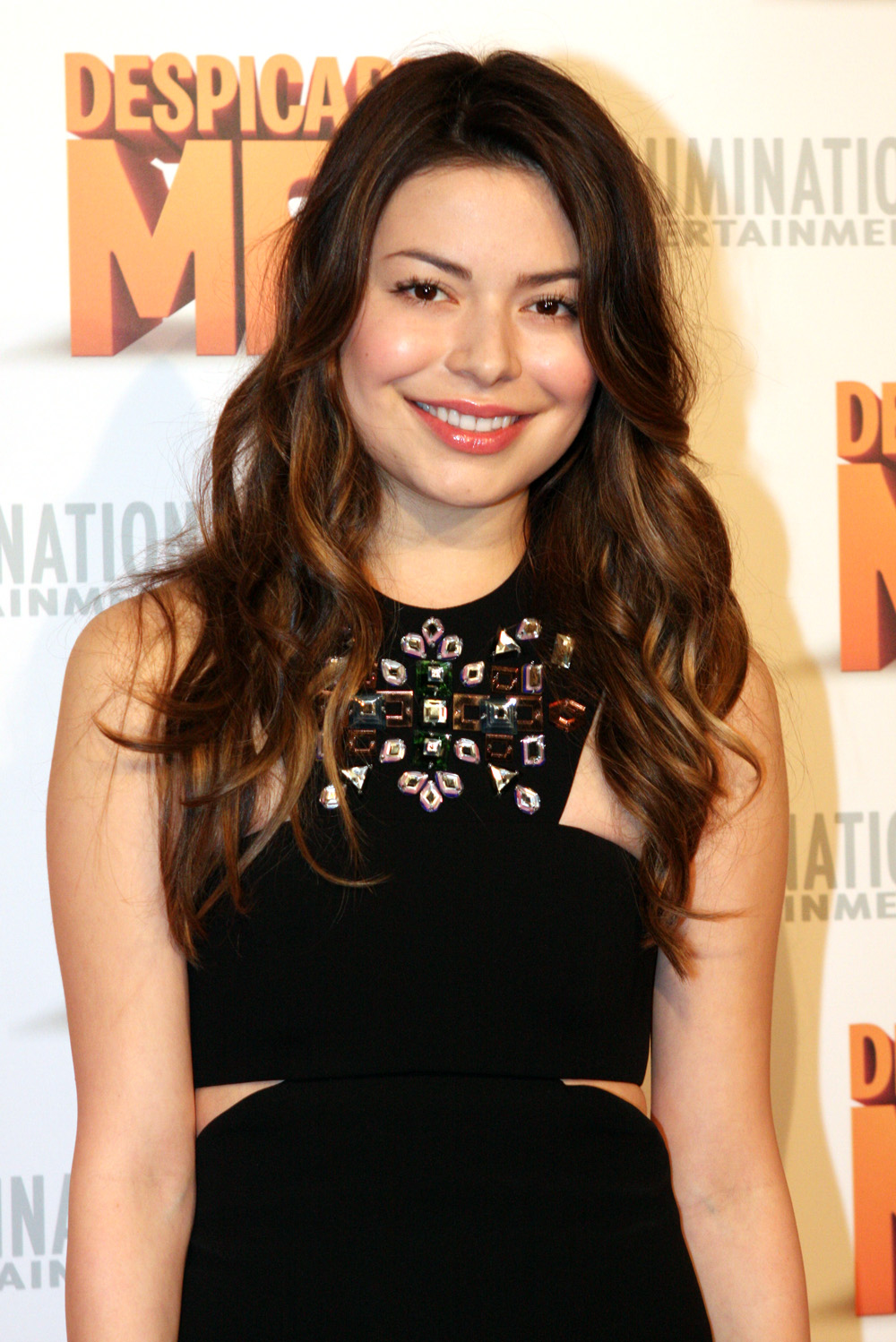
Miranda Cosgrove

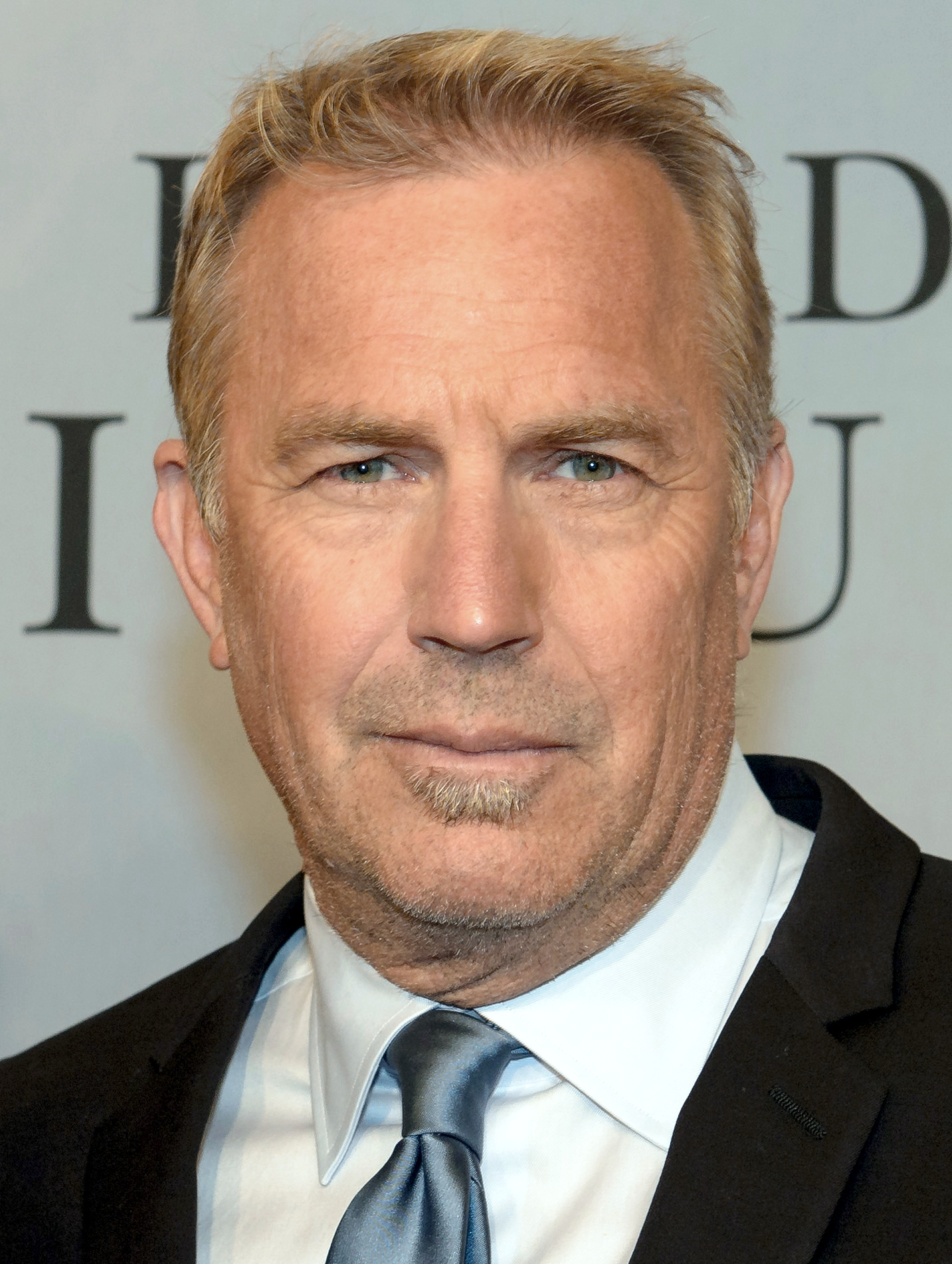
Kevin Costner

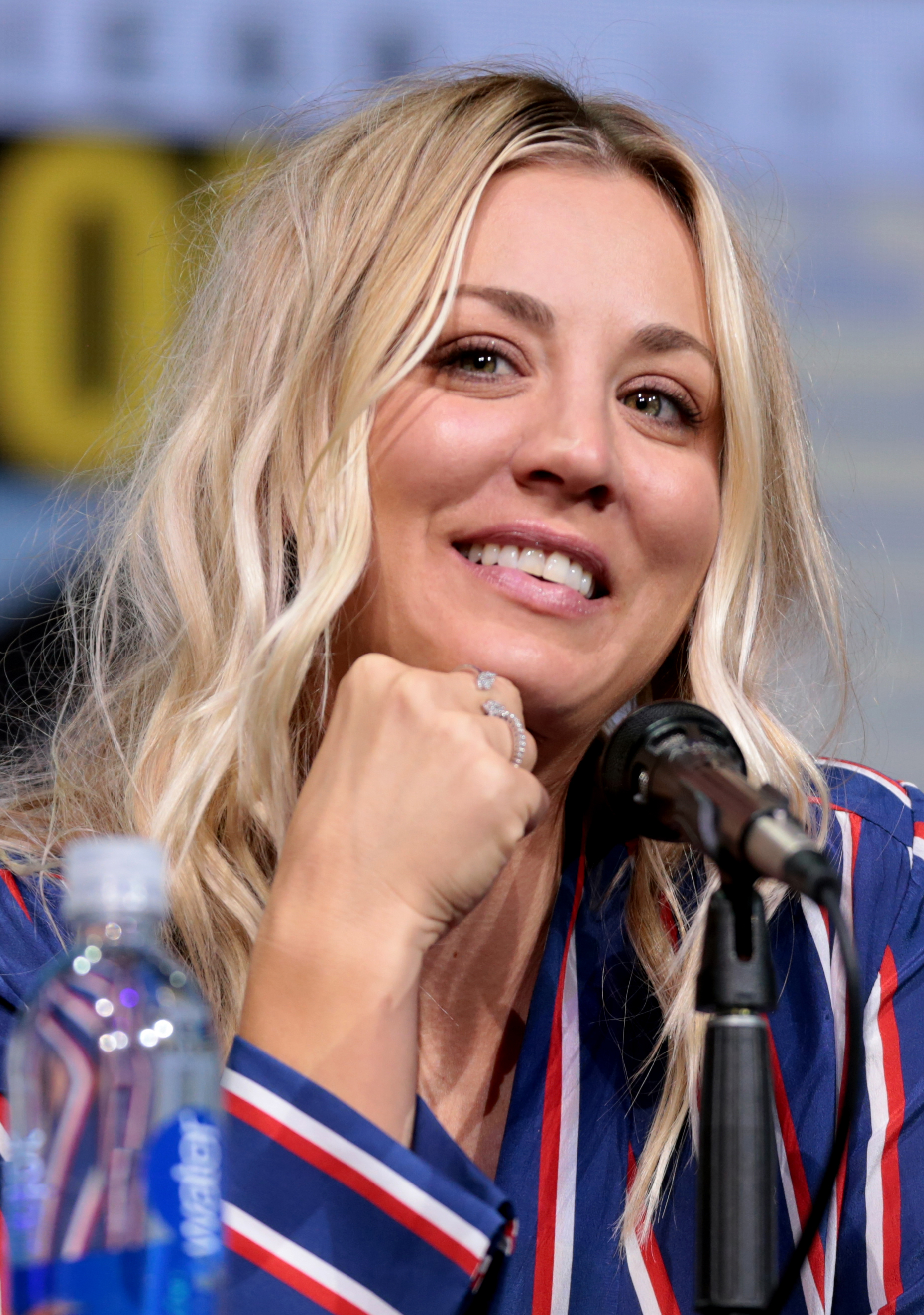
Kaley Cuoco

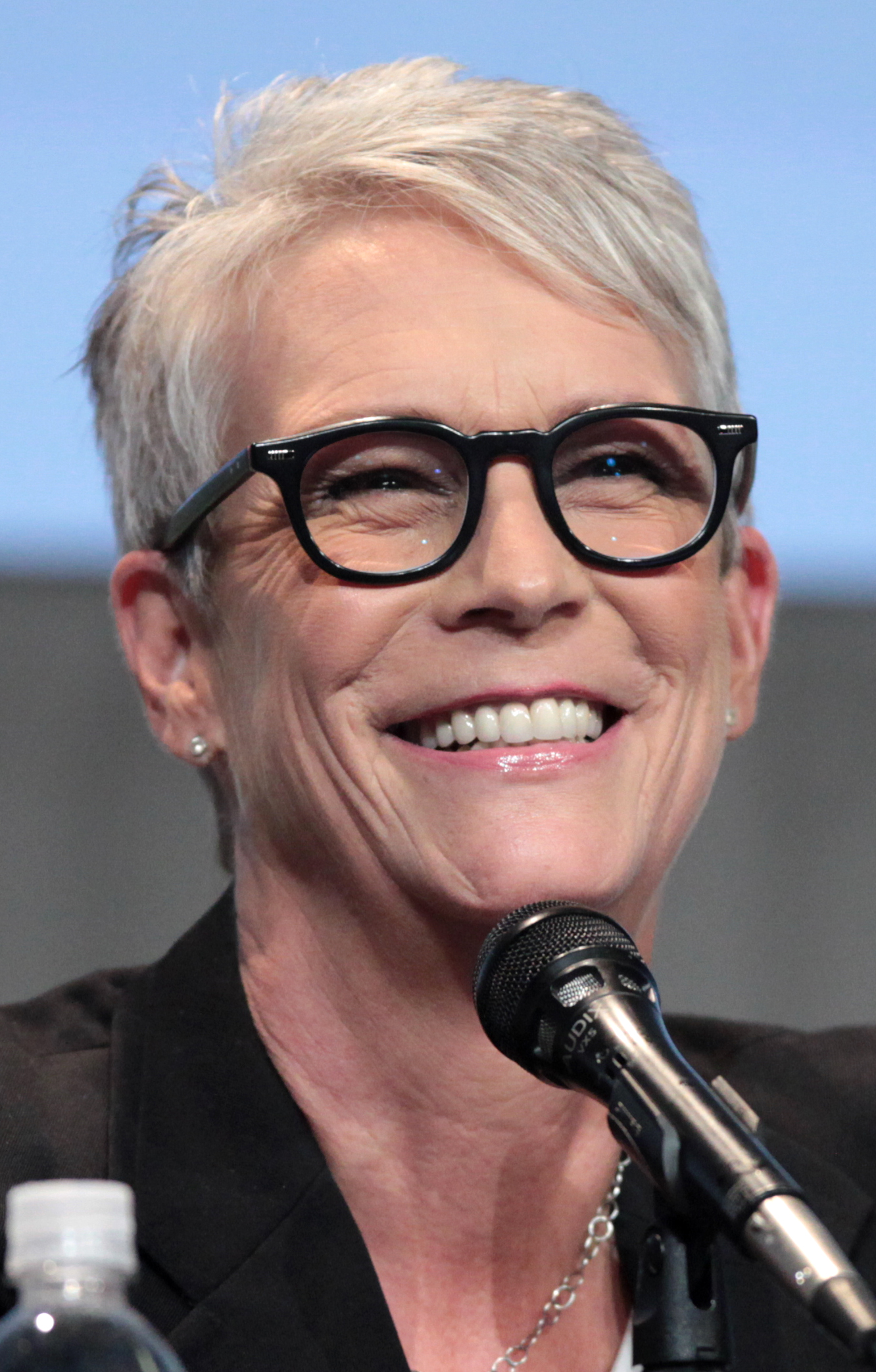
Jamie Lee Curtis

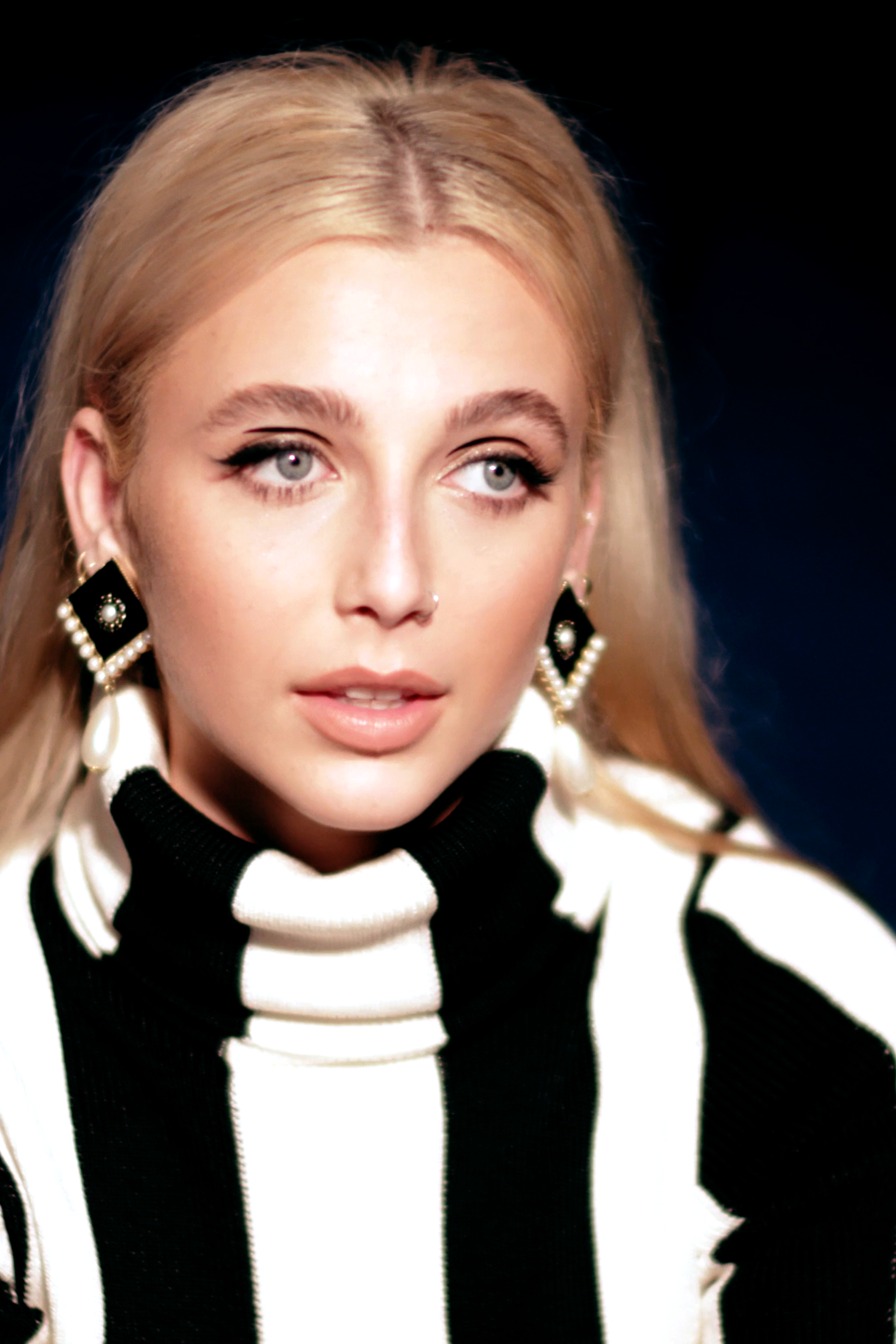
Emma Chamberlain

- Scott Caan – actor (Hawaii Five-0 and Ocean's series)
- Johnathan Cabral – Olympic hurdler
- Richard Cabral – actor
- Herb Caen – newspaper columnist (San Francisco Chronicle)
- John Cage – composer
- Nicolas Cage – actor
- Colbie Caillat – singer
- Evan Call – composer
- Calmatic – filmmaker
- Angelo Caloiaro (born 1989) – American-Italian basketball player in the Israeli Basketball Premier League
- Greg Camarillo – NFL wide receiver
- Dove Cameron – actress (Liv and Maddie)
- Dolph Camilli – baseball player
- Colleen Camp – actress
- Ben Nighthorse Campbell – U.S. senator from Colorado
- Brooke Candy – rapper
- Nick Cannon – actor, television presenter, rapper
- Lizzy Caplan – actress
- Linda Cardellini – actress (Freaks and Geeks)
- Tucker Carlson – television host
- Adam Carolla – radio and television personality
- David Carr – football quarterback
- Derek Carr – football quarterback
- David Carradine (1936–2009) – actor (Kill Bill: Volume 1, Kill Bill: Volume 2, Kung Fu)
- Ever Carradine – actress and daughter of Robert Carradine
- Keith Carradine – actor (Deadwood, Nashville)
- Robert Carradine – actor (Revenge of the Nerds)
- Mercedes Carrera – pornographic film actress
- Pete Carroll – college and National Football League football coach
- Adam Carson – drummer for AFI
- Chris Carter – producer, director, and writer (The X-Files)
- Mike Carter (born 1955) – American-Israeli basketball player
- Aya Cash – actress
- Chris Cashman – filmmaker (Thane of East County)
- Shaun Cassidy – singer
- Torry Castellano – drummer for The Donnas
- Henry Cejudo – former UFC champion, Olympic gold medalist in freestyle wrestling
- Carly Chaikin – actress
- Emma Chamberlain – internet personality
- Richard Chamberlain – actor
- Brandi Chastain – soccer player
- Jessica Chastain – actress (The Tree of Life, Zero Dark Thirty)
- Kwan Cheatham (born 1995) – basketball player in the Israel Basketball Premier League
- Cher – actress and singer
- Joey Chestnut – competitive eater
- Julia Child – chef, author, and television personality
- Margaret Cho – actress and comedian
- Justin Chon – actor
- Amy Chow – gymnast
- Jamie Chung – actress
- Eddie Cibrian – actor (Sunset Beach, Third Watch, CSI: Miami)
- Marcia Clark – lawyer
- Melinda Clarke – actress (The O.C., CSI: Crime Scene Investigation)
- Lana Clarkson – actress (Fast Times at Ridgemont High)
- Les Claypool – bass player (Primus)
- Mark Clear – Major League Baseball two-time All-Star relief pitcher
- Doug Clifford – drummer (member of the band Creedence Clearwater Revival)
- Angus Cloud (1998–2023) – actor (Euphoria)
- Johnnie Cochran – lawyer (1937–2005)
- Claire Coffee – actress
- Audra Cohen (born 1986) – tennis player
- Jordan Cohen (born 1997) – American-Israeli basketball player in the Israel Basketball Premier League
- Sasha Cohen – figure skater
- Lillie Hitchcock Coit – firefighter
- Keyshia Cole – singer
- Natalie Cole – singer
- Austin Coleman – BMX rider and television personality
- Jerry Coleman – soldier and sportscaster
- Chris Colfer – actor (Glee) and author (The Land of Stories)
- Holly Marie Combs – actress (Charmed)
- Maureen Connolly – tennis player
- Mike Connors – actor (Mannix)
- Lauren Conrad – television personality, fashion designer, and author
- Elisha Cook Jr. – actor (The Maltese Falcon)
- Coolio (1963–2022) – rapper, singer, record producer, and actor
- Lillian Copeland (1904–1964) – Olympic discus champion; set world records in discus, javelin, and shot put
- Ivan Cornejo – singer-songwriter
- Miranda Cosgrove – actress and singer (School of Rock, Drake & Josh, iCarly)
- Michael Costello – fashion designer
- Kevin Costner – actor and director (Dances with Wolves, Field of Dreams)
- Natalie Coughlin – Olympic swimmer
- Glenn Cowan (1952–2004) – table tennis player
- Nikki Cox – actress (Las Vegas)
- Carly Craig – actress (Hall Pass)
- Mary Lynde Craig – president, Pacific Coast Women's Press Association
- Alan Cranston – U.S. senator from California
- Bryan Cranston – actor (Malcolm in the Middle, Breaking Bad)
- Laura Creavalle – Guyanese-born Canadian-American professional bodybuilder
- Richard Crenna – actor
- Darren Criss – actor
- William Henry Crocker – philanthropist and founder of Crocker National Bank
- James Cromwell – actor
- Joe Cronin – Hall of Fame baseball player and manager
- David Crosby – musician
- Denise Crosby – actress (Star Trek: The Next Generation)
- Cameron Crowe – filmmaker
- Raymond Cruz – actor
- Kaley Cuoco – actress (The Big Bang Theory)
- Jake Curhan (born 1998) – American football offensive tackle for the Seattle Seahawks of the National Football League (NFL)
- Vinny Curran – actor (Resolution, Everybody Dies by the End)
- Valorie Curry – actress (The Tick)
- Jamie Lee Curtis – actress (Halloween, Trading Places, True Lies, Freaky Friday)
- Cole Custer – NASCAR driver
- Miley Cyrus – singer

== D ==
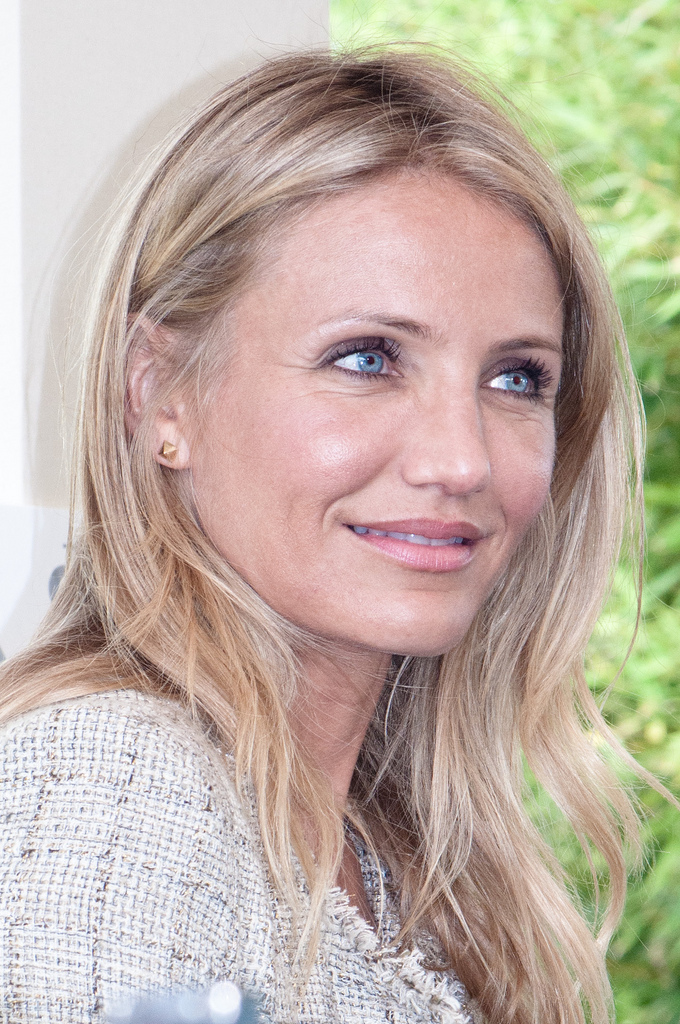
Cameron Diaz

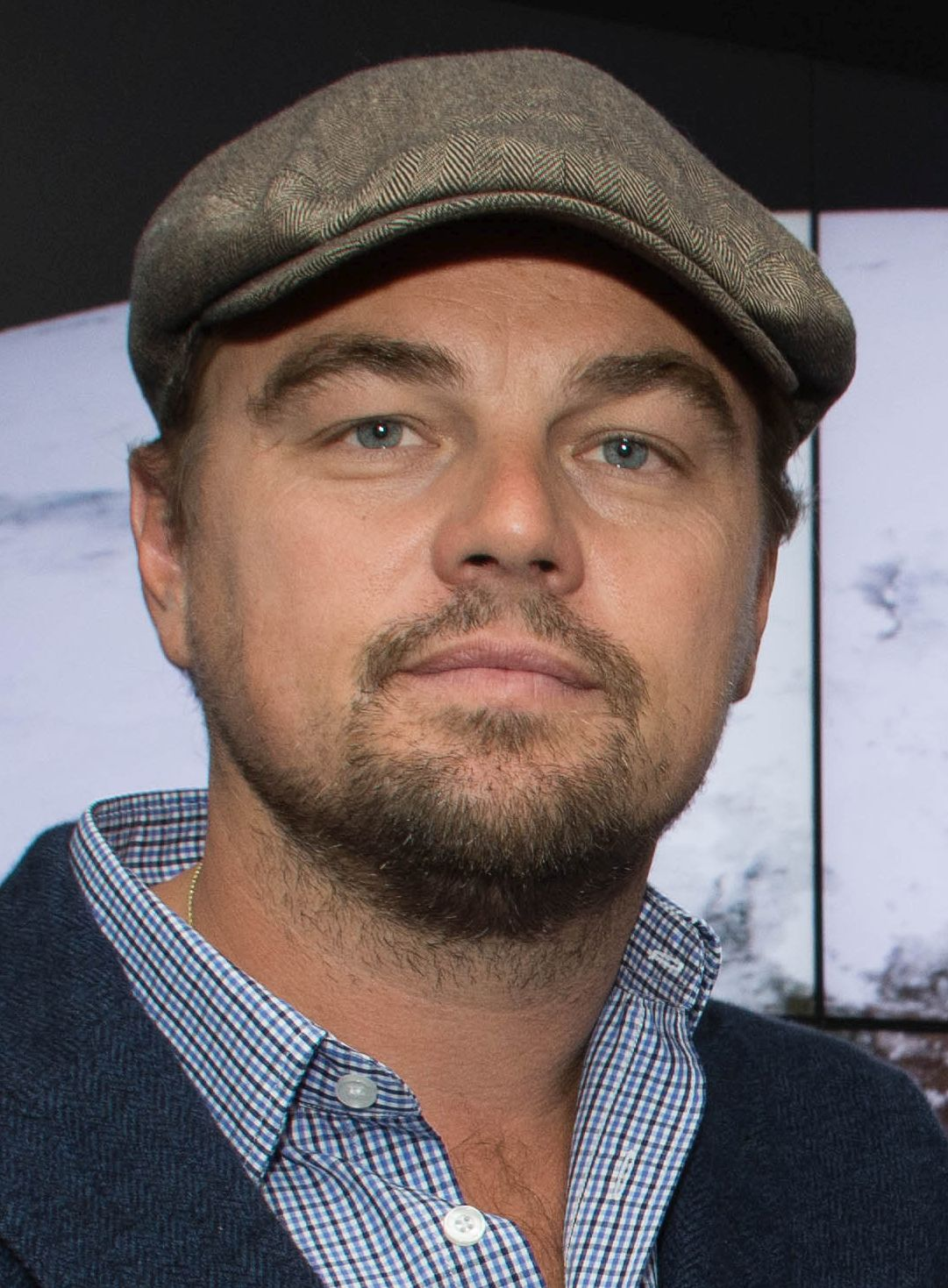
Leonardo DiCaprio

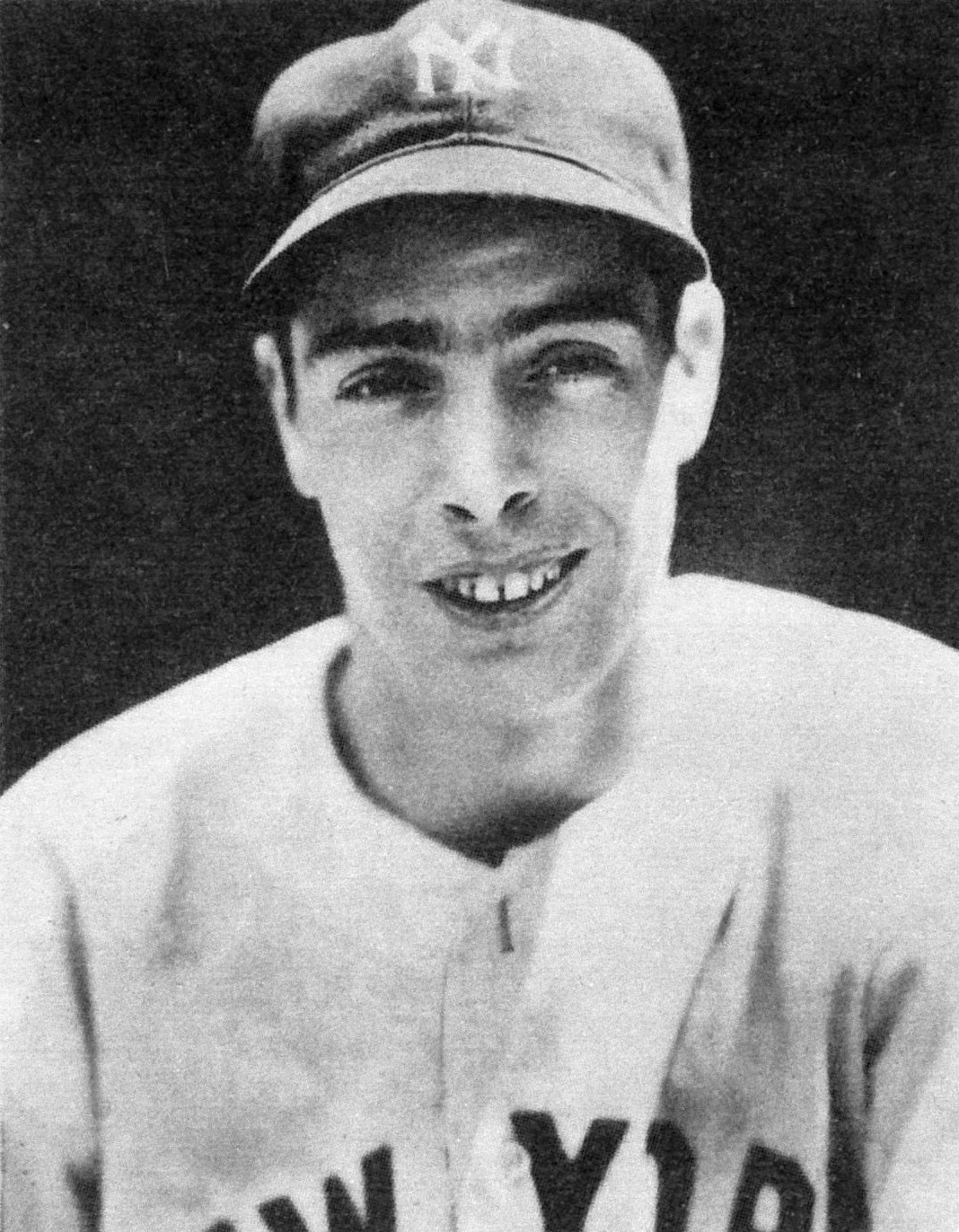
Joe DiMaggio

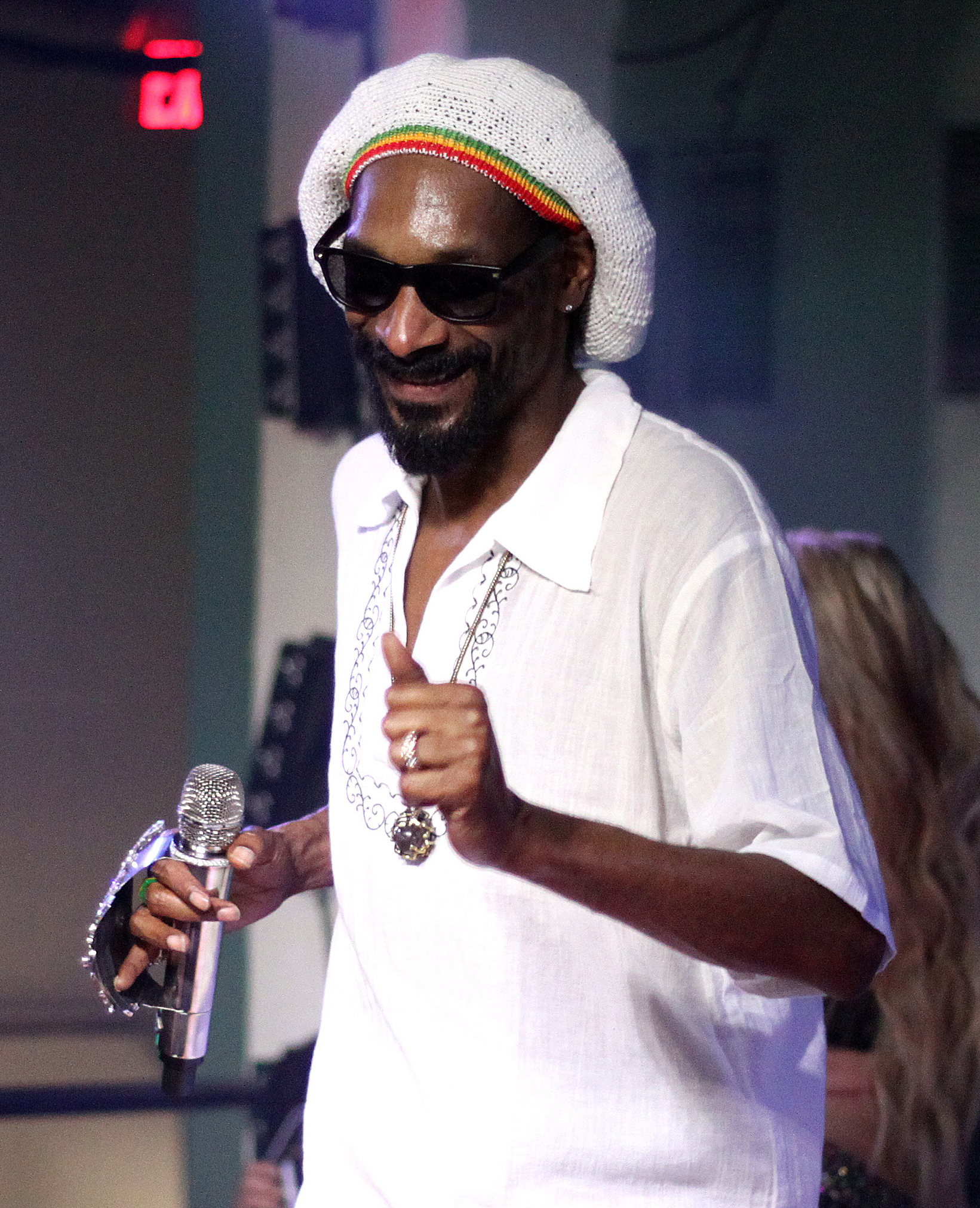
Snoop Dogg

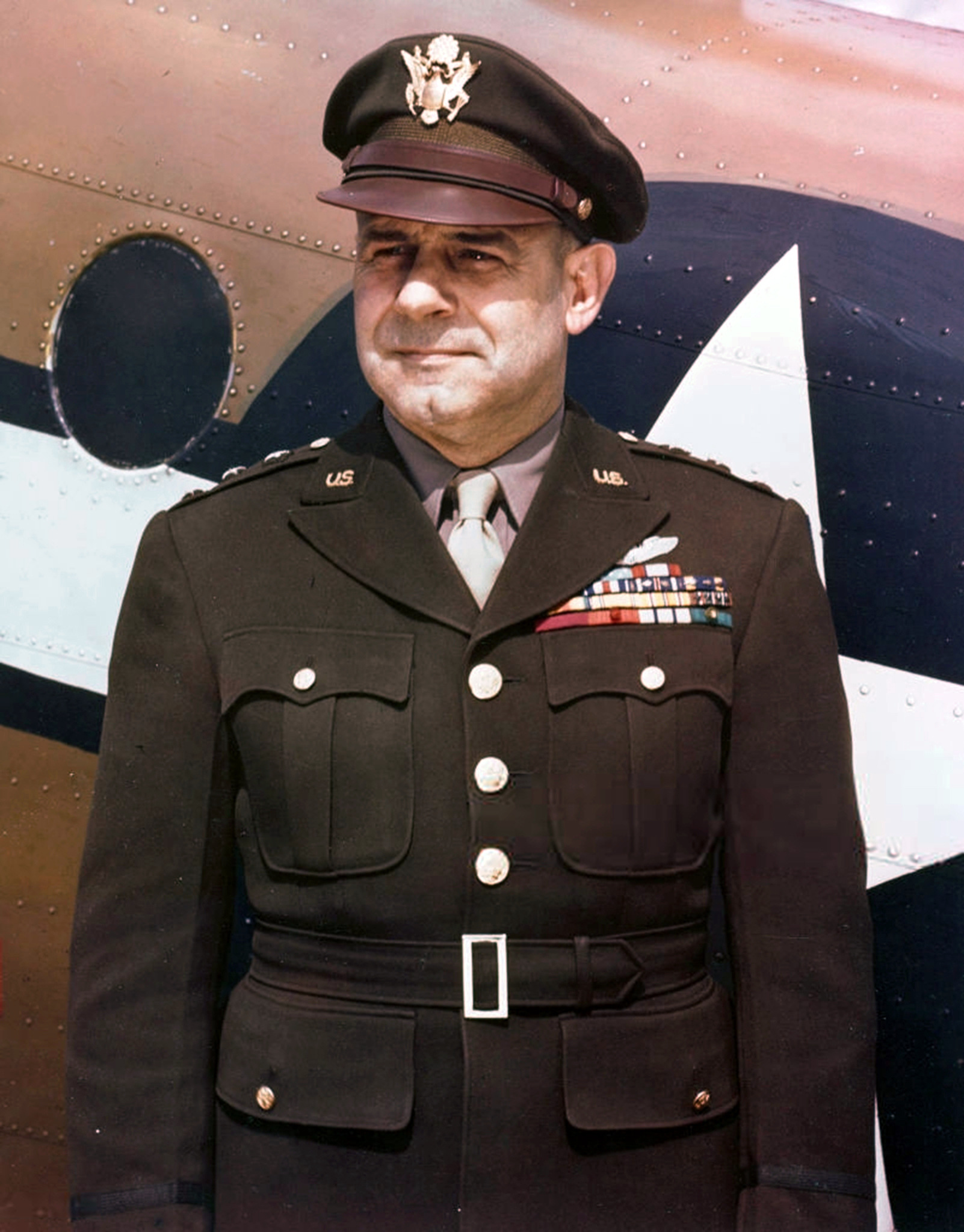
James H. Doolittle

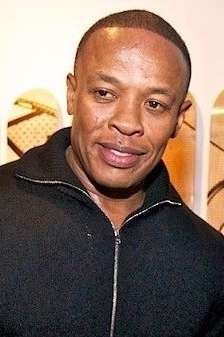
Dr. Dre

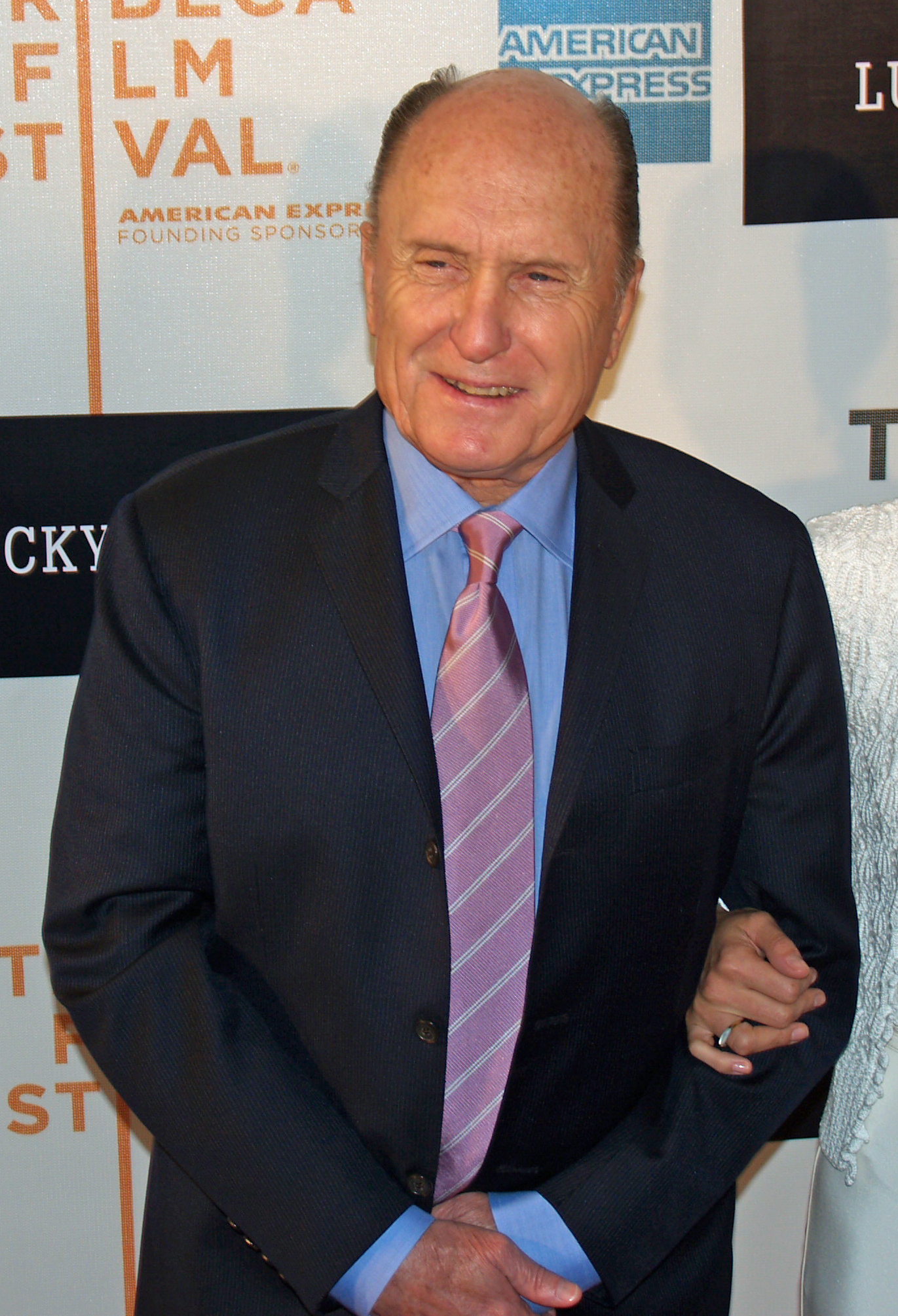
Robert Duvall

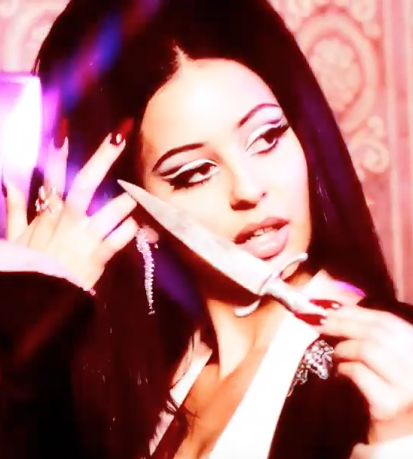
Alexa Demie

- Carson Daly – television host
- Zubin Damania (born 1973) – physician, comedian, internet personality, musician, and founder of Turntable Health
- Caroline D'Amore – musician, actress, and model
- Spencer Daniels – actor
- Sean Danielsen – singer and musician (Smile Empty Soul)
- Harry Danning – Major League Baseball All-Star catcher
- Ted Danson – actor (Cheers, Becker, The Good Place)
- Iva Toguri D'Aquino (Tokyo Rose) – radio broadcaster during World War II
- Christopher Darden – lawyer
- Sam Darnold – NFL quarterback
- Lindsay Davenport – tennis player
- Baron Davis – professional basketball player
- Jonathan Davis – singer and musician
- Lucius Davis (born 1970) – basketball player
- Noah Davis (nicknamed Diesel; born 1997) – MLB baseball player (Colorado Rockies)
- Terrell Davis – professional football player
- Randy Davison – actor (Mank, The United States vs. Billie Holiday)
- Ken Davitian – Armenian-American character actor
- Devin Dawson – singer and musician
- Shane Dawson – YouTuber, actor, filmmaker, writer, and musician
- Mandana Dayani (born 1982) – Iranian-American businesswoman and media executive
- Jonathan Dayton – film director (Little Miss Sunshine)
- Erika De La Cruz – television host
- Oscar De La Hoya – boxer
- Brian de la Puente – National Football League center
- Zack de la Rocha – activist and singer (Rage Against the Machine)
- Luca de la Torre – soccer player
- Giada De Laurentiis – Italian born chef
- Rebecca De Mornay (born 1959) – film and television actress
- Lil Debbie – rapper
- Jayme Dee – singer and musician
- Javin DeLaurier (born 1998) – basketball player in the Israeli Basketball Premier League
- Grey DeLisle – voice actress
- Tom DeLonge – singer and musician (Blink-182)
- Brad Delson – musician (Linkin Park)
- Alexa Demie – actress and singer
- Doug DeMuro – YouTuber
- David Denman – actor
- Deorro – DJ and musician
- Bo Derek – actress
- Laura Dern – actress
- DeMar DeRozan – professional basketball player (Sacramento Kings)
- Emily Deschanel – actress (Bones)
- Zooey Deschanel – actress and singer (New Girl)
- Zoey Deutch – actress
- Jeff Deverett – film producer (Full Out, The Samuel Project)
- Dimitri Diatchenko – actor
- Cameron Diaz – actress (Charlie's Angels, Charlie's Angels: Full Throttle)
- Nate Diaz – professional mixed martial artist
- Nick Diaz – professional mixed martial artist
- Matt DiBenedetto – NASCAR driver
- Leonardo DiCaprio – Academy Award–winning actor (The Departed, Titanic)
- Joan Didion – writer
- Nahshon Dion – writer
- Vin Diesel – actor (Fast & Furious, The Chronicles of Riddick, xXx)
- Trent Dilfer – National Football League quarterback
- Joe DiMaggio – baseball player
- Gianna Dior – pornographic film actress
- Frank DiPalermo – actor, playwright, and poet (We All Die Alone)
- Maya DiRado – Olympic swimmer
- Roy E. Disney – billionaire and nephew of Walt Disney
- Cong Thanh Do – Vietnamese American activist
- David Dobrik – vlogger
- Nate Dogg – musician
- Snoop Dogg – rapper
- Doja Cat – rapper and singer
- Ami Dolenz – actress and daughter of Micky Dolenz
- Micky Dolenz – actor, musician, and singer (The Monkees)
- Jason Dolley – actor
- Landon Donovan – soccer player
- Jimmy Doolittle – general and aviation pioneer
- Tyler Dorsey (born 1996) – Greek–American basketball player in the Israeli Basketball Premier League
- Marcus Dove – basketball player
- Stacy Dragila – pole vaulter
- Dr. Dre – musician, hip-hop producer, and record producer
- K. Eric Drexler – engineer
- Don Drysdale – baseball player
- Hilary Duff – actress and singer (Lizzie McGuire, Younger)
- Dumbfoundead – Argentine-born Asian American rapper
- Tom Dumont – guitarist (No Doubt)
- Isadora Duncan – dancer
- Ann Dunnigan – translator, actor, and teacher
- Robert Duvall – actor
- Jermaine Dye – baseball player (Chicago White Sox)

== E ==
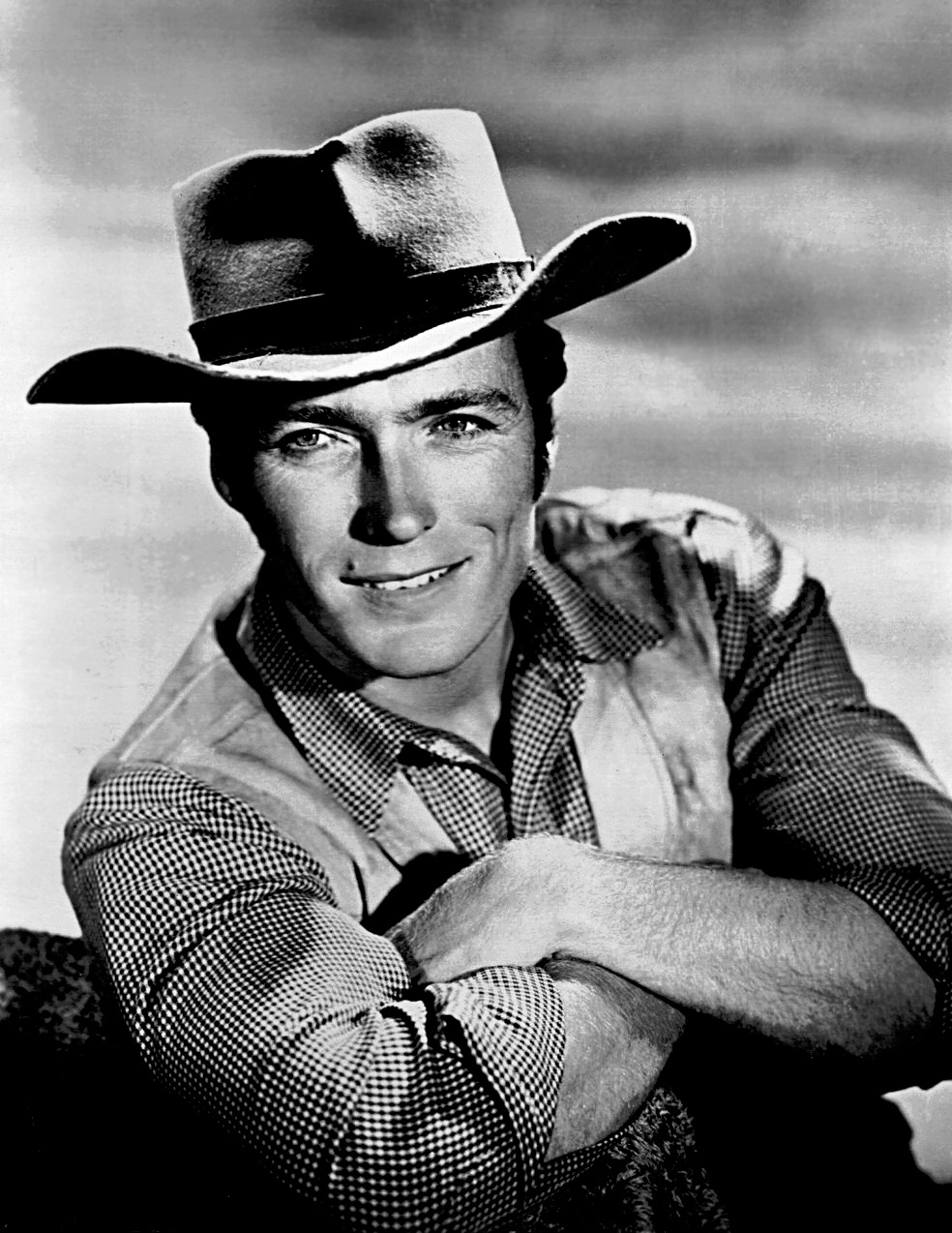
Clint Eastwood

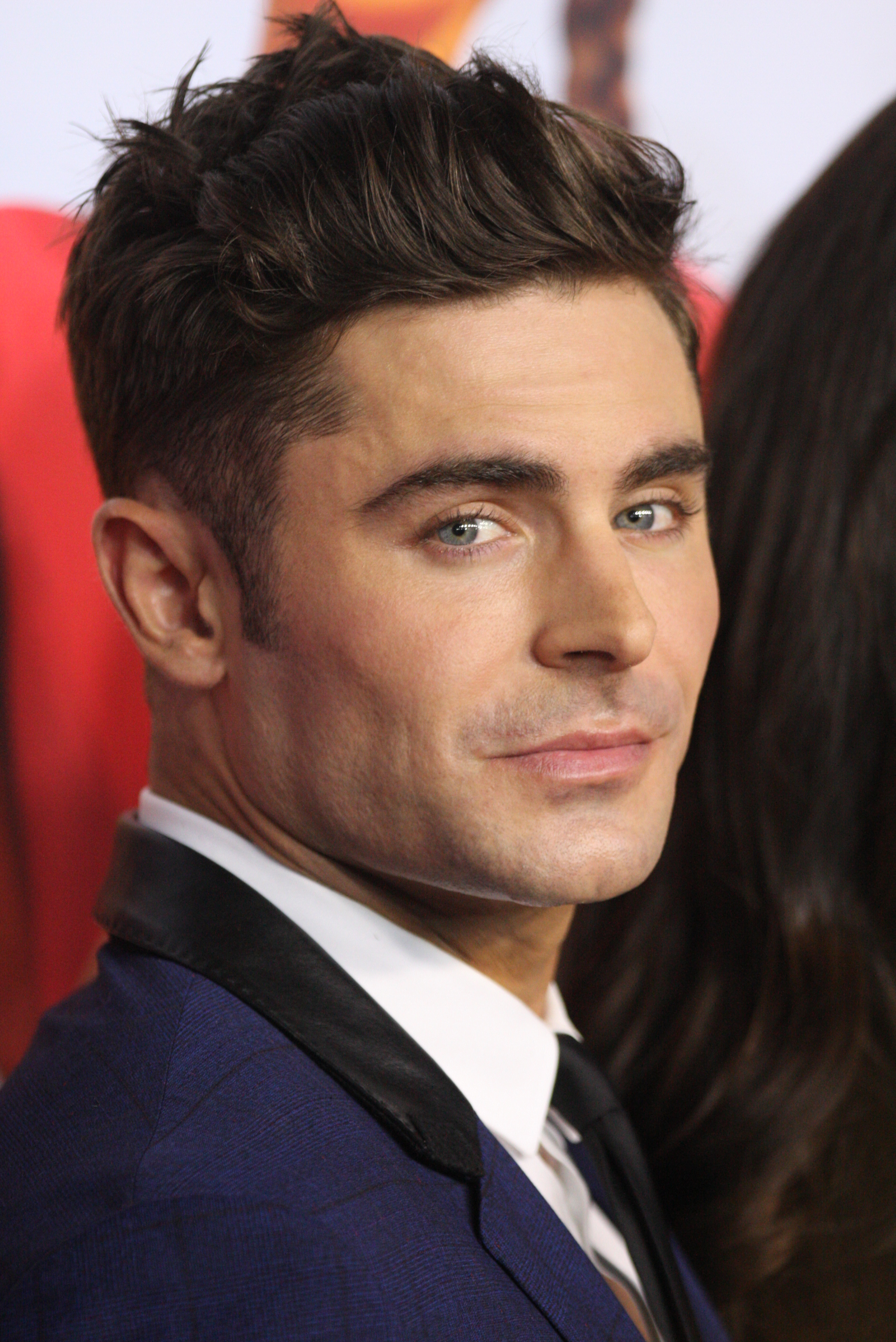
Zac Efron

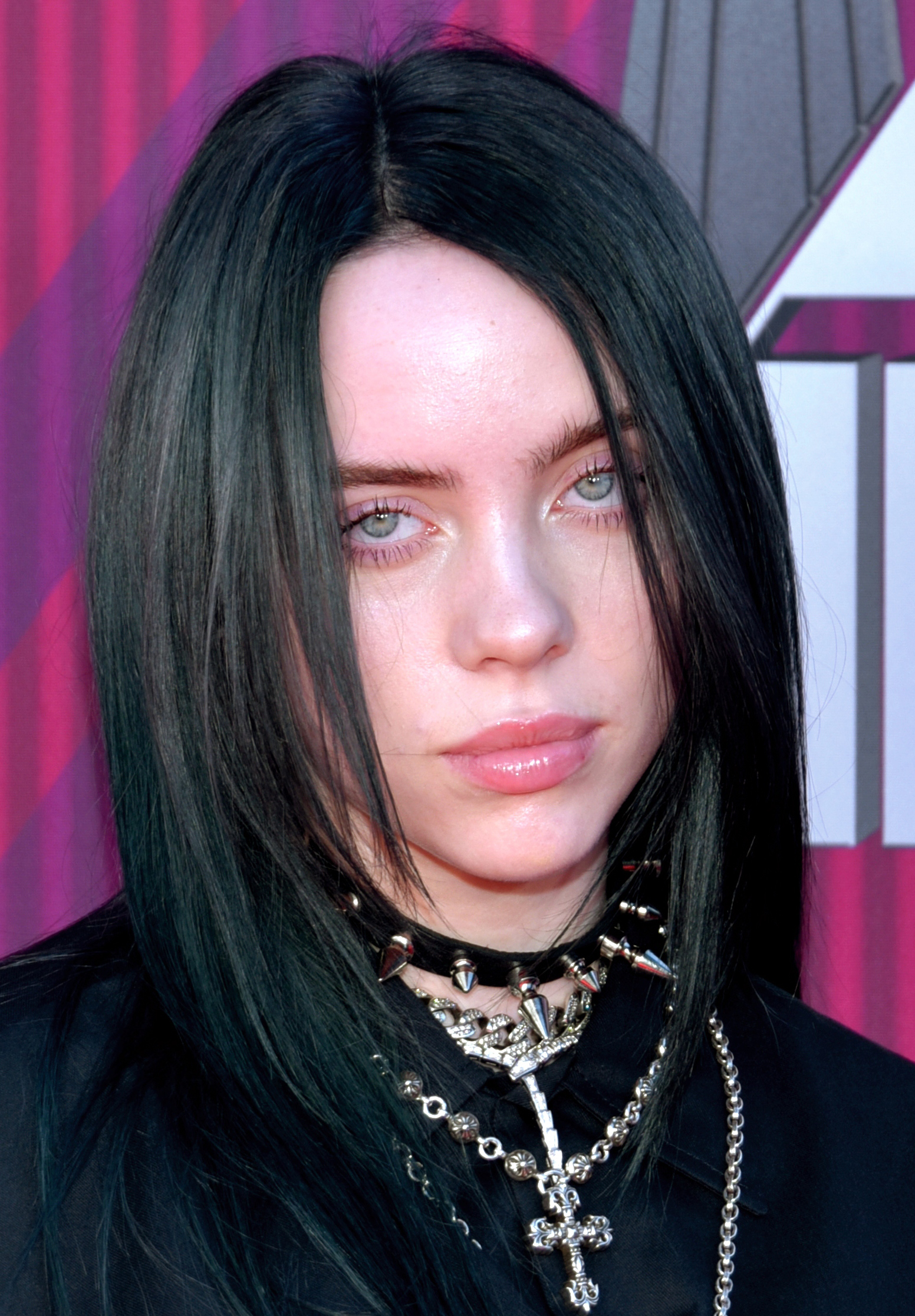
Billie Eilish

- E-40 – rapper
- Sheila E. – singer
- Carl Earn (1921–2007) – tennis player
- Clint Eastwood – film actor and director (Million Dollar Baby, Unforgiven)
- Eazy-E – rapper
- Buddy Ebsen – actor and dancer
- Dennis Eckersley – baseball pitcher
- Aaron Eckhart – actor
- Julian Edelman – National Football League wide receiver
- Anthony Edwards – actor
- Mack Ray Edwards (1918–1971) – child sex abuser/serial killer; committed suicide by hanging in his prison cell
- Zac Efron – film and television actor (High School Musical)
- Susan Egan – actress
- Billie Eilish – singer
- Thelma "Tiby" Eisen (1922–2014) – baseball player
- Isaiah Eisendorf (born 1996) – American-Israeli basketball player in the Israeli Basketball Premier League
- Danny Elfman – musician and composer
- Jenna Elfman – actress
- Richard Elfman – film director (Forbidden Zone)
- Sam Elliott – actor
- Amit Elor (born 2004) – freestyle wrestler, 2024 Olympic champion and 8x world champion
- Roger Guy English – businessman, disc jockey, and Guinness World Record holder
- Anabel Englund – singer
- Robert Englund – actor and director (A Nightmare on Elm Street)
- Hayden Epstein – National Football League kicker
- Mike "SuperJew" Epstein – Major League Baseball first baseman
- Philip Erenberg (1909–1992) – gymnast and Olympic silver medalist
- Eric Erlandson – musician
- Zach Ertz – NFL tight end
- Addie Garwood Estes – temperance activist
- Chris Evans – convicted train robber
- Evidence – rapper
- Briana Evigan – actress (Step Up)

== F ==
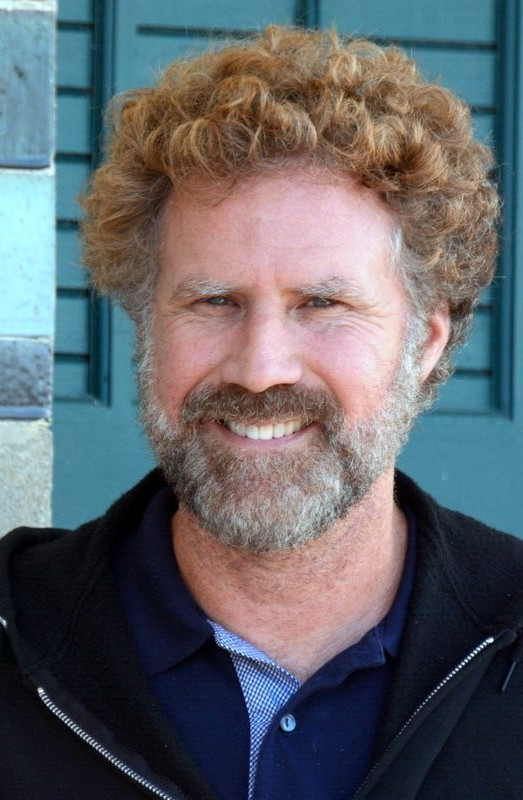
Will Ferrell

Sally Field

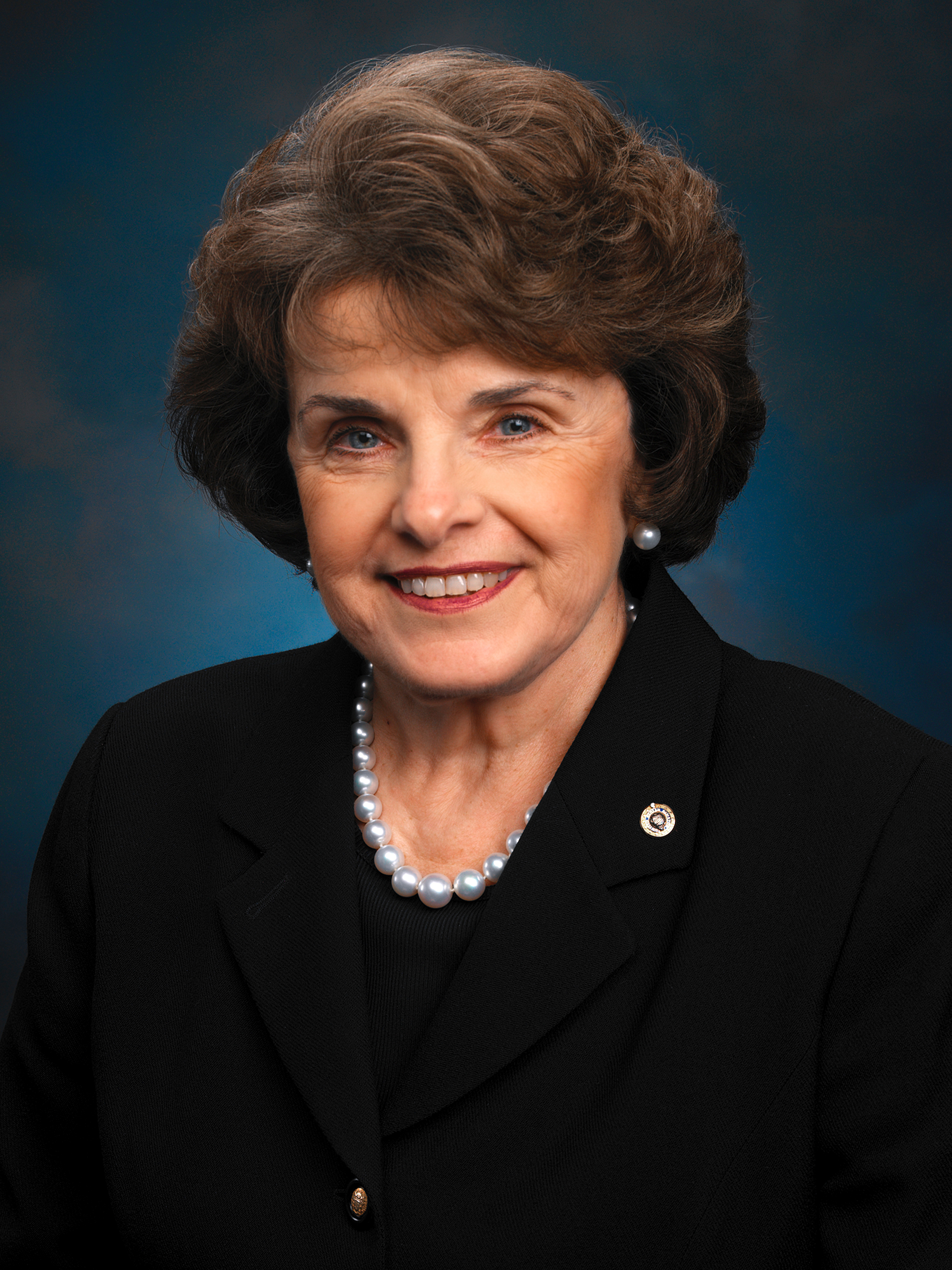
Dianne Feinstein

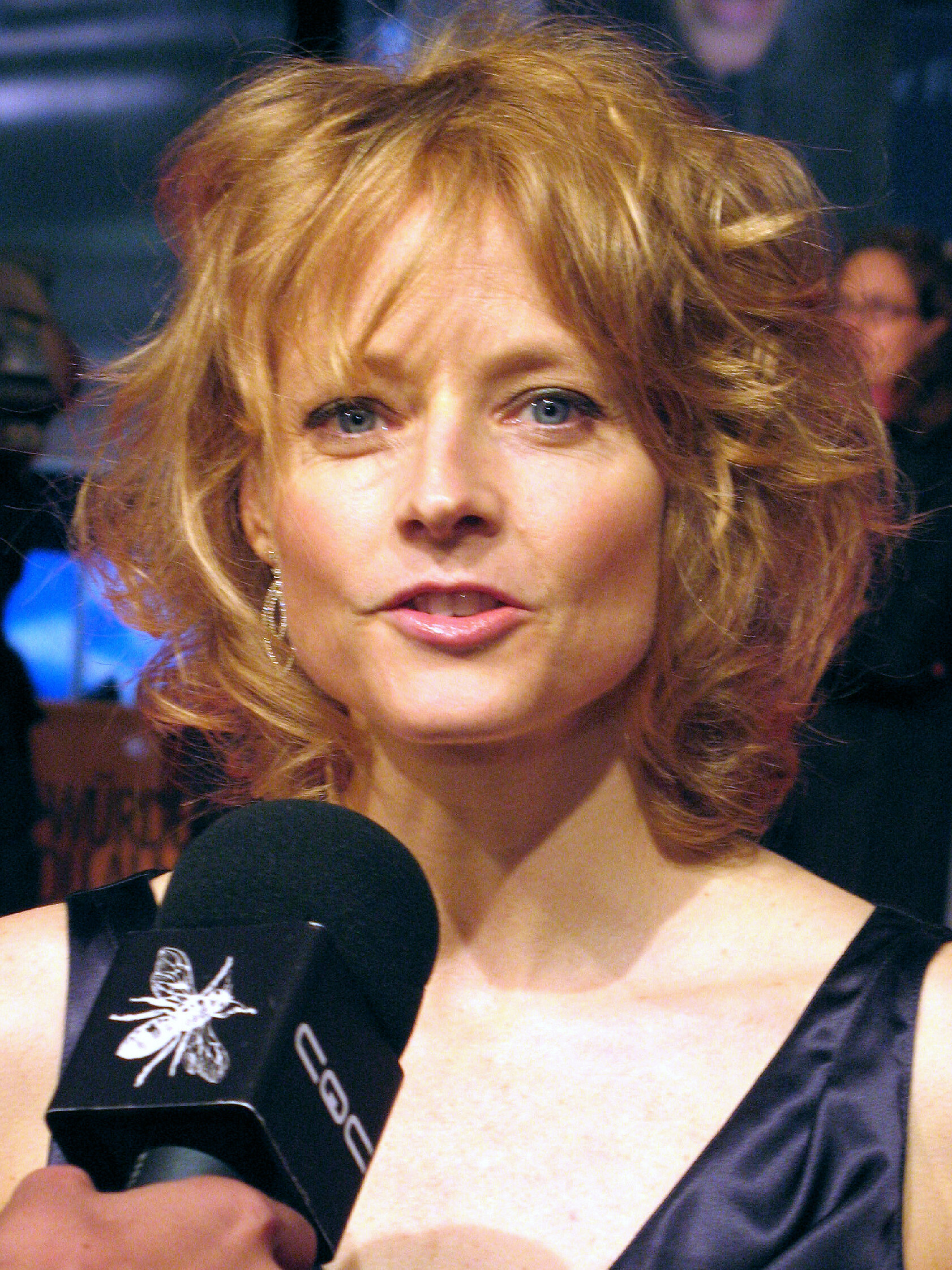
Jodie Foster

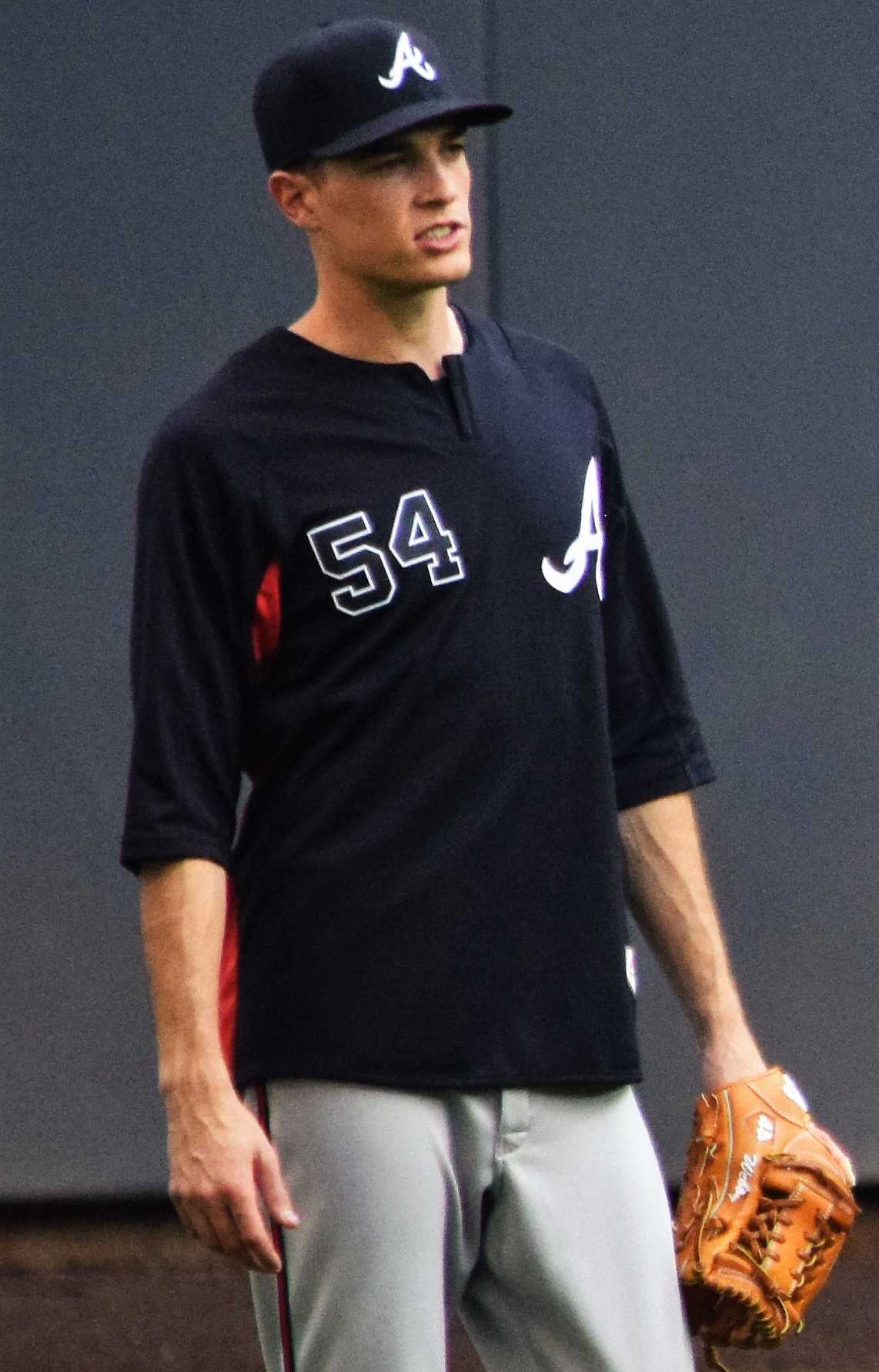
Max Fried

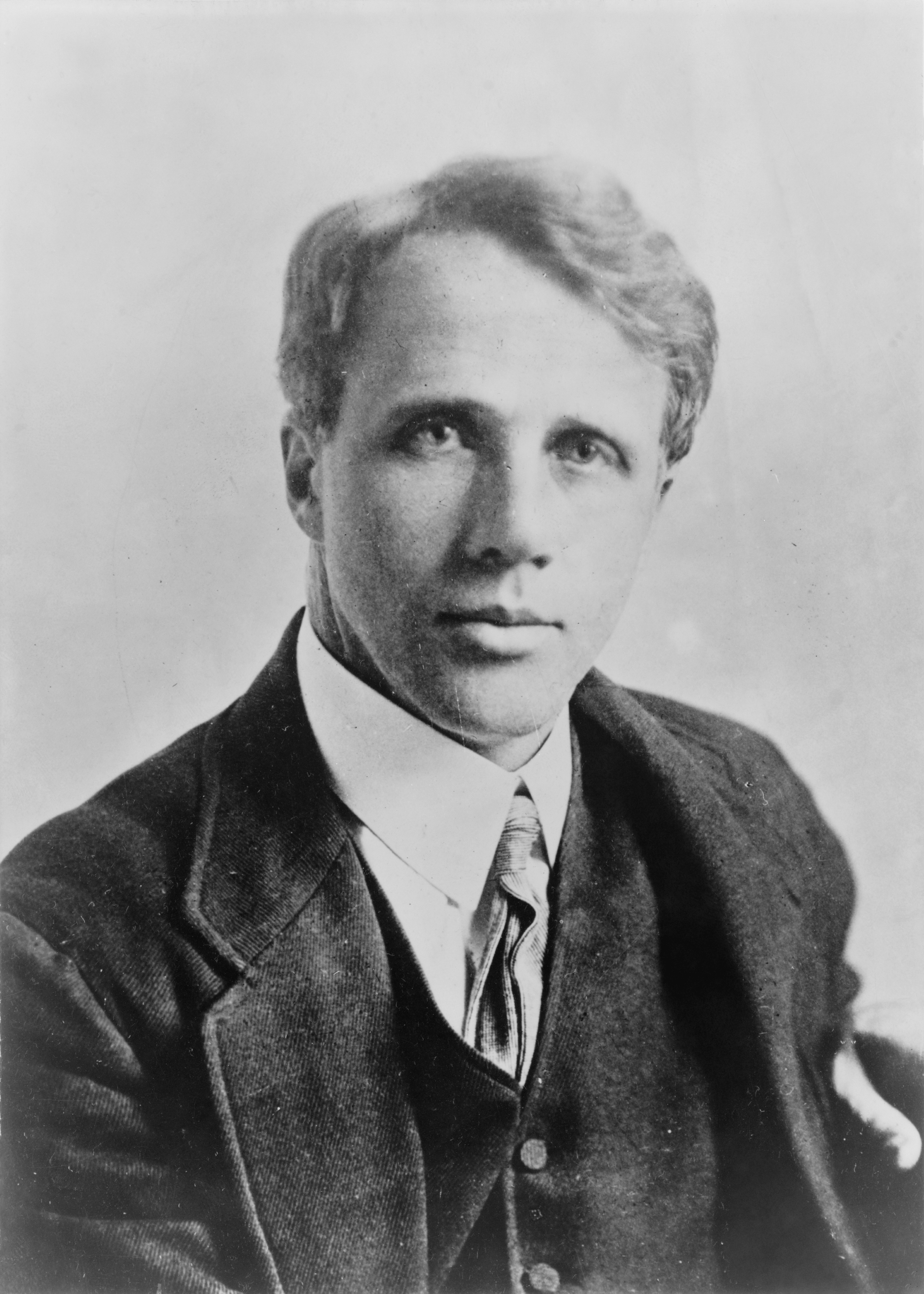
Robert Frost

- Shelley Fabares – actress and singer
- Daeg Faerch – actor (Halloween, Hancock)
- Bill Fagerbakke – actor and voice actor (Patrick Star)
- Lorrie Fair – retired soccer player
- Heather Fargo – mayor of Sacramento, California
- Valerie Faris – film director (Little Miss Sunshine)
- Jordan Farmar – basketball player
- Mia Farrow – actress
- David Faustino – actor (Married... with Children)
- Kevin Federline – rapper and former backup dancer
- Wayne Federman – comedian
- Roshon Fegan – actor
- Benny Feilhaber – soccer midfielder
- Dianne Feinstein (1933–2023) – U.S. senator from California and mayor of San Francisco (1978–88)
- Beanie Feldstein – actress
- Fergie (Stacy Ferguson) – singer, actress, and composer (The Dutchess, Fergalicious)
- Carlee Fernández – sculptor and photographer
- Shiloh Fernandez – actor
- Sky Ferreira – singer, model, and actress
- Will Ferrell – actor
- Miguel Ferrer – actor (RoboCop, Crossing Jordan, NCIS: Los Angeles)
- America Ferrera – Honduran-American actress (Ugly Betty, Superstore, Barbie)
- Sally Field − actress (Norma Rae, Places in the Heart)
- Aundrea Fimbres – singer
- Chloe Fineman – actress
- Carrie Fisher – actress (Star Wars) and writer
- Jon Fisher – author and entrepreneur
- Anna M. Fitch – writer
- Peggy Fleming – figure skater
- Shaun Fleming – actor (Kim Possible)
- Rhonda Fleming – actress and singer
- John Fogerty – musician (founded the band Creedence Clearwater Revival)
- Abigail Folger – coffee heiress, socialite, and murder victim
- Bridget Fonda – actress
- Lyndsy Fonseca – actress
- Paloma Ford – vocalist
- Jon Foreman – singer
- Dian Fossey – zoologist
- DeShaun Foster – football player
- Jodie Foster – actress (The Accused, The Silence of the Lambs)
- Michael Lewis Foster – filmmaker (To Fall in Love)
- Rickie Fowler – professional golfer
- Allen Fox – tennis player (ranked as high as # 4) and coach
- Mackenzie Foy – actress and model
- Dillon Francis – music producer and DJ
- Louise E. Francis – journalist
- Dave Franco – actor and brother of James
- James Franco – actor and brother of Dave
- Paulette Frankl – artist and biographer
- Bonnie Franklin – actress
- Jeff Franklin – director (Full House)
- Missy Franklin – 2012 Olympic gold medalist (swimming)
- Cody Freeman – baseball player (Texas Rangers)
- Freddie Freeman – baseball player (Los Angeles Dodgers)
- Tyler Freeman – baseball player (Colorado Rockies)
- Max Fried – baseball pitcher (Atlanta Braves)
- Kevin Friedland (born 1981) – soccer player
- Taylor Fritz – tennis player
- Frost – rapper
- Robert Frost – poet
- Kurt Fuller – actor
- Edward Furlong – actor (Terminator 2: Judgment Day)
- Fuslie – live streamer

== G ==
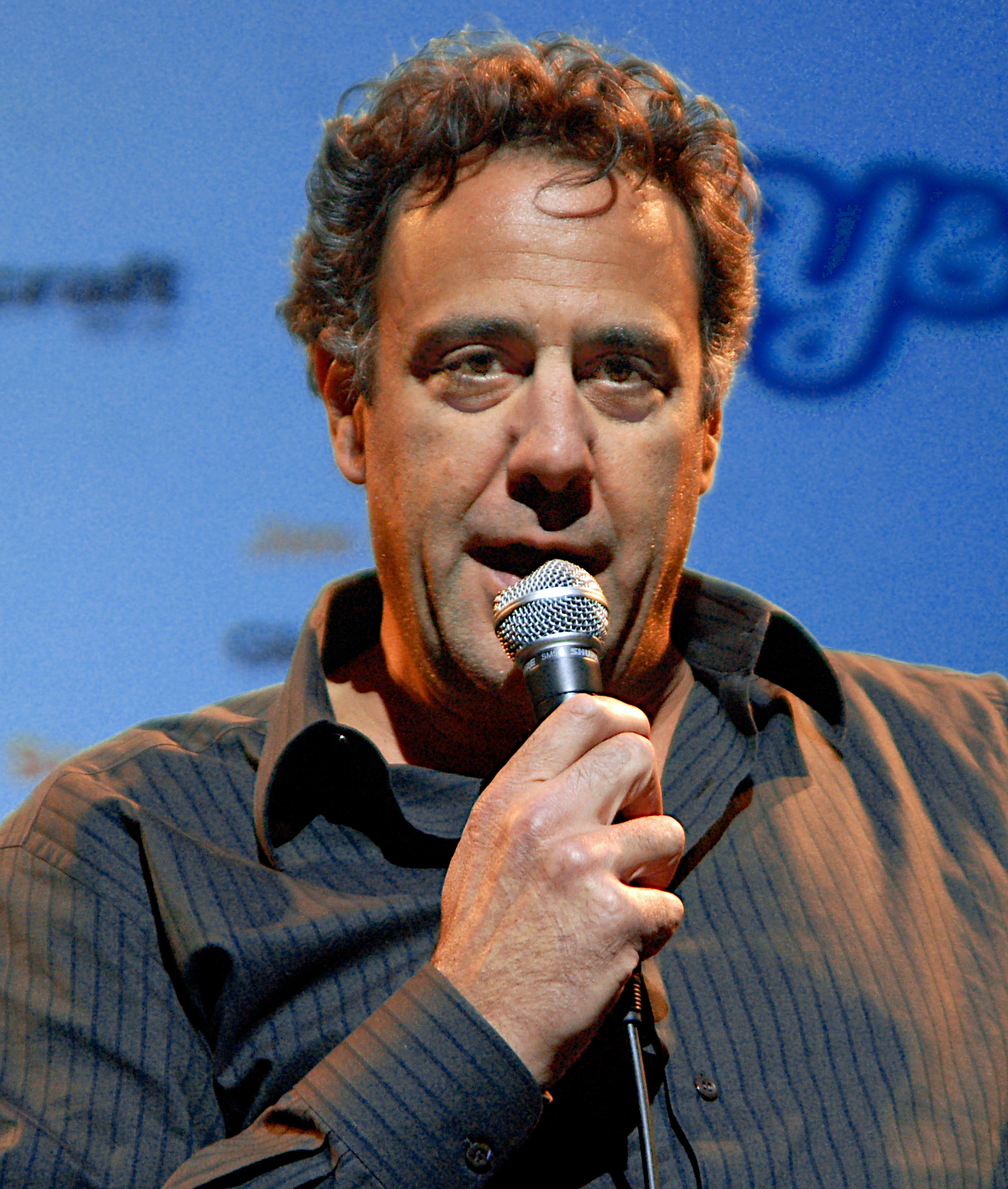
Brad Garrett

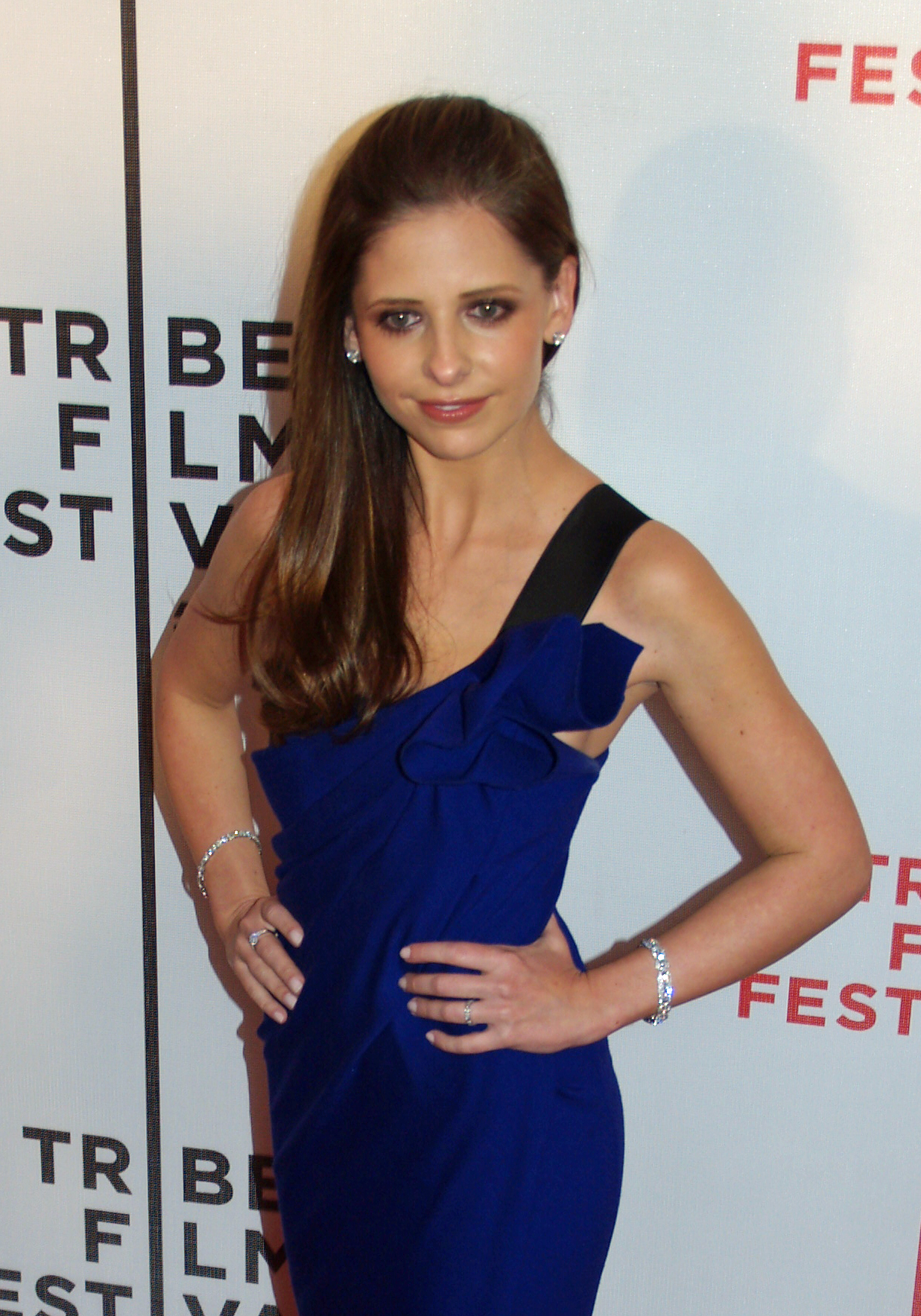
Sarah Michelle Gellar

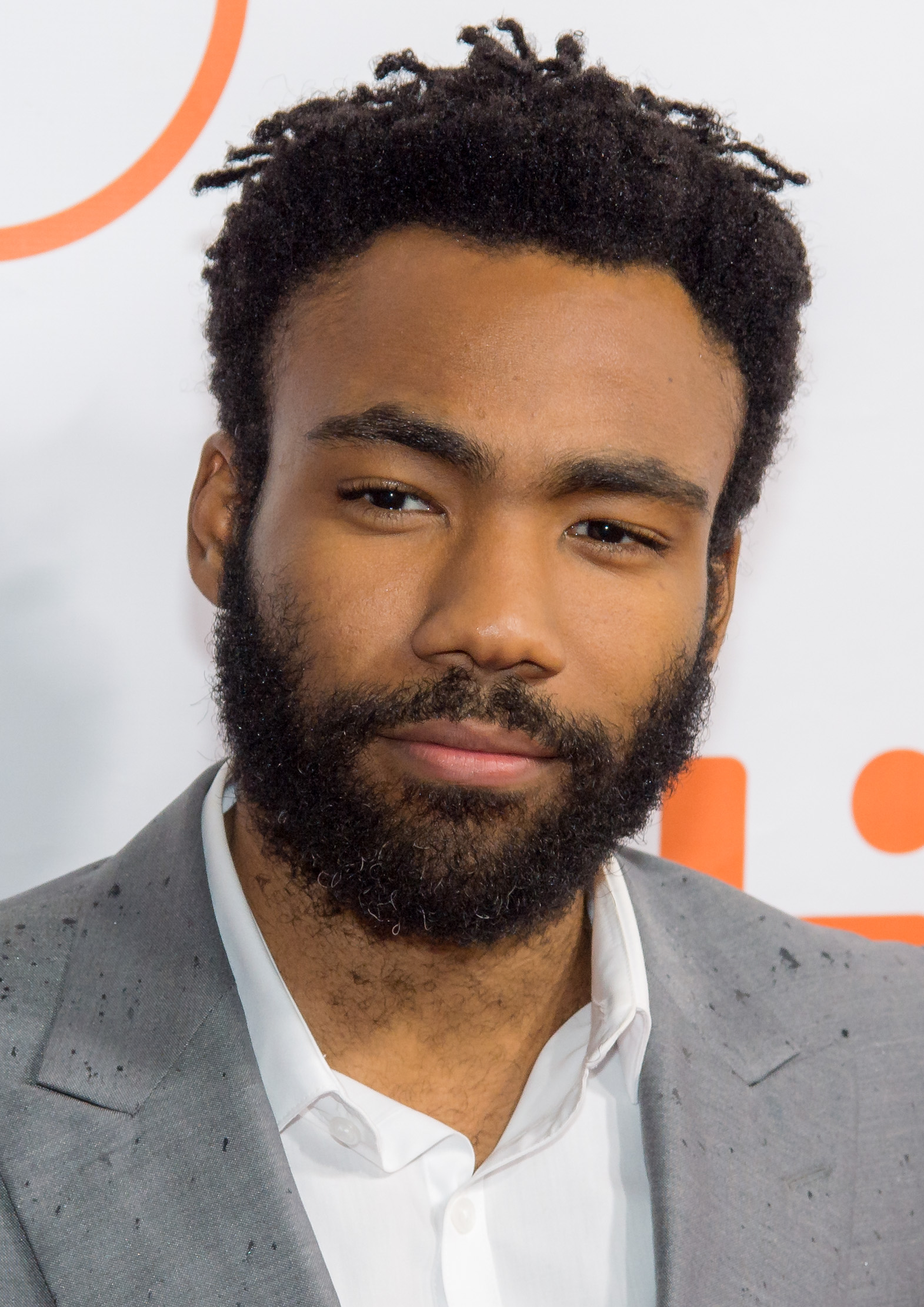
Donald Glover

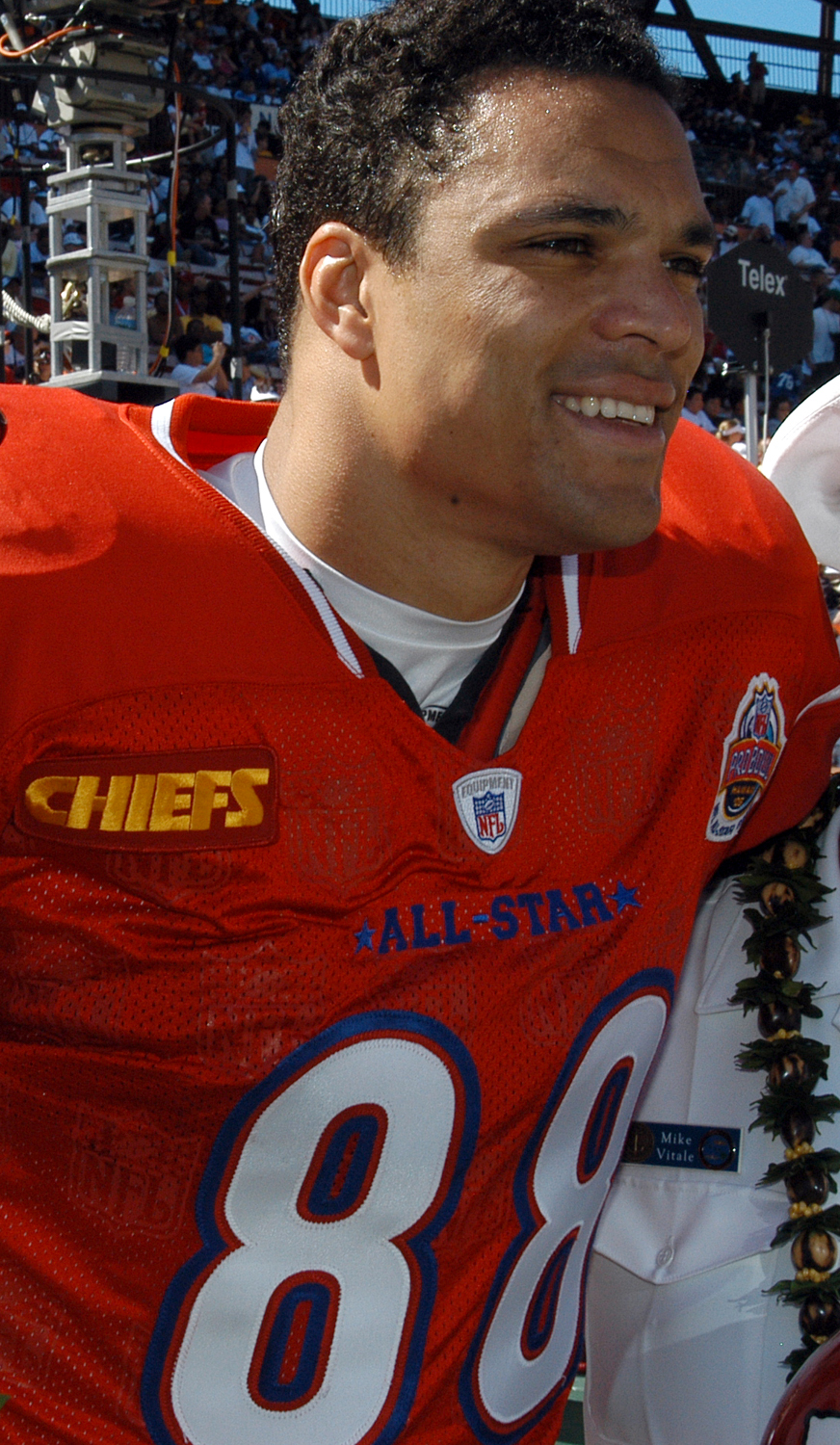
Tony Gonzalez

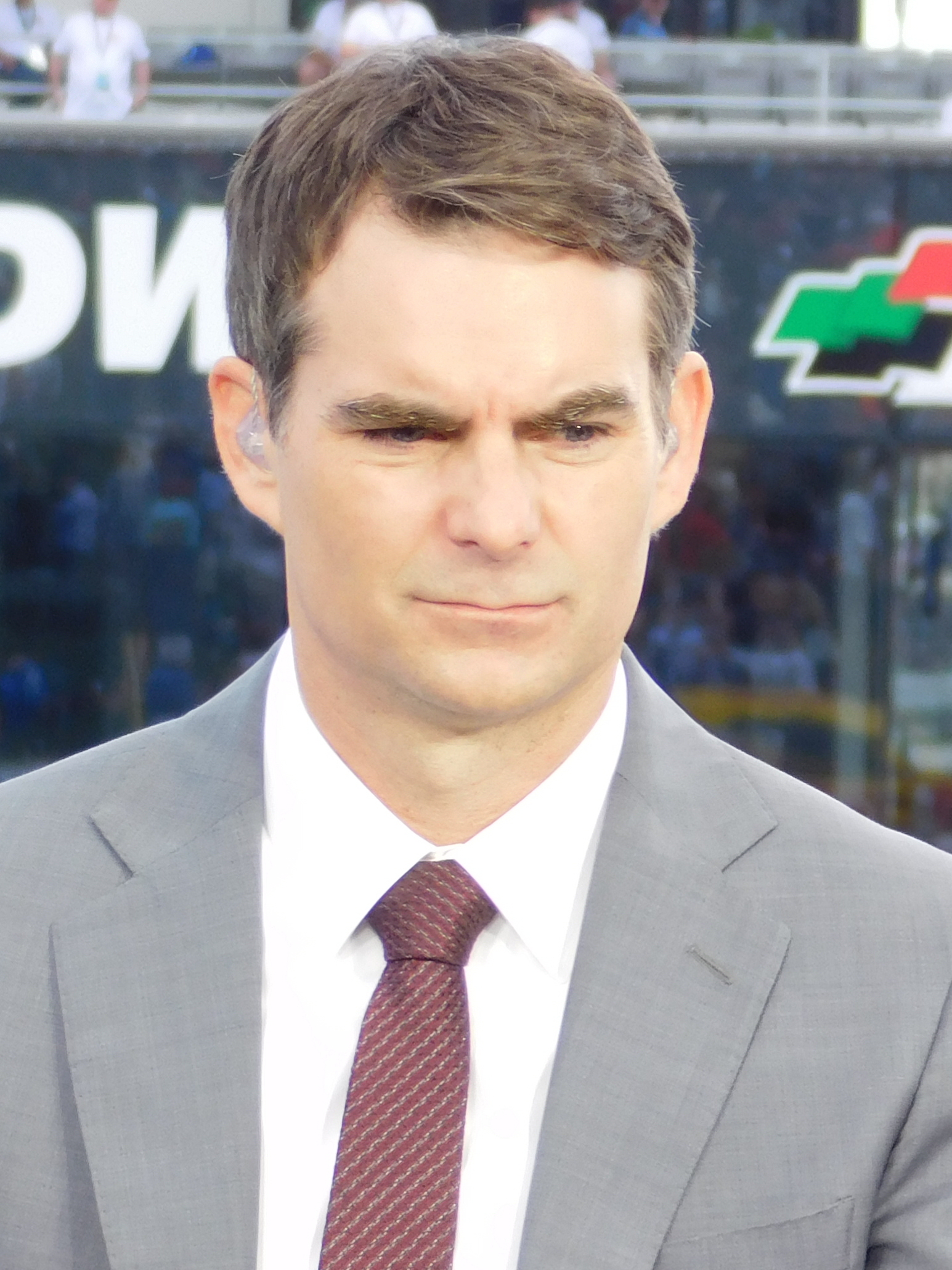
Jeff Gordon

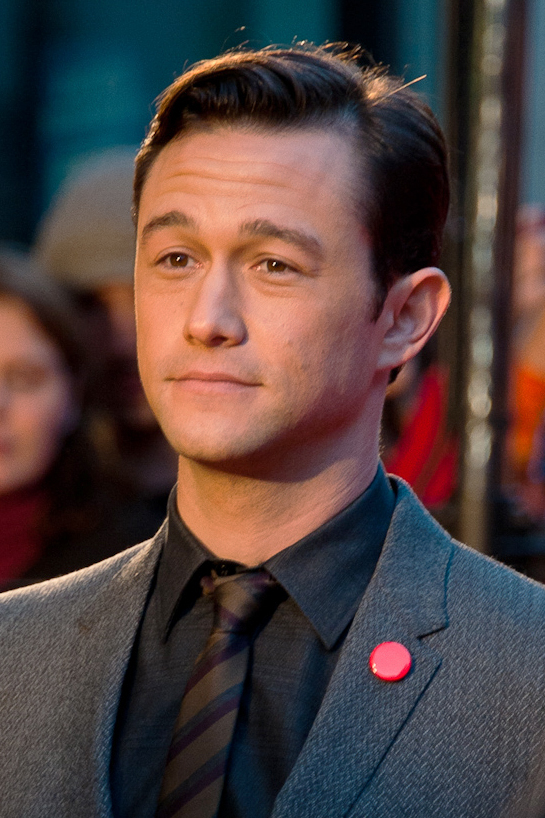
Joseph Gordon-Levitt

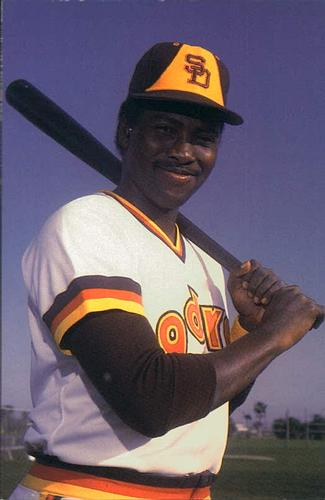
Tony Gwynn

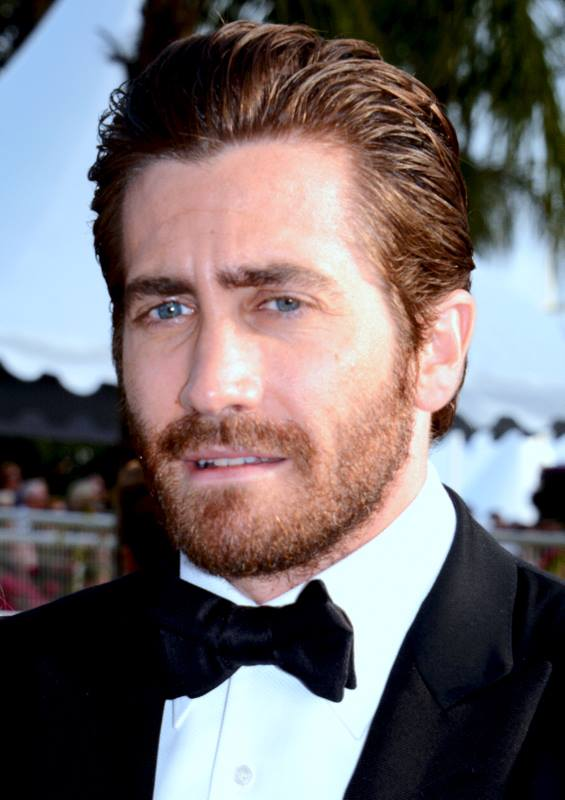
Jake Gyllenhaal

- Becky G – singer-songwriter and actress
- G-Eazy – rapper, singer and record producer
- Guy Gabaldon – United States Marine Corps
- Lynx and Lamb Gaede – white nationalist twin singers and musicians
- Lady Gaga – singer
- Lukas Gage – actor (The White Lotus)
- Richard Gage – 9/11 Truth movement activist
- Corey Gaines (born 1965) – basketball player and coach
- Beth Gallagher – actress (To Fall in Love)
- Trace Gallagher – journalist
- Ray Gallardo – film director and cinematographer (Friend of the World)
- The Game – rapper and actor
- Eric Garcetti – mayor of Los Angeles
- Jeff Garcia – football player
- Jerry Garcia – musician (Grateful Dead)
- Ryan Garcia – professional boxer
- Andrew Garfield – actor
- Brad Garrett – actor (A Bug's Life, Everybody Loves Raymond)
- Spencer Garrett – actor
- Wolfgang Gartner – music producer and DJ
- Kyle Gass – musician (Tenacious D)
- Dirk Gates – network entrepreneur (Xirrus)
- John Gavin – actor and ambassador
- Sarah Michelle Gellar – actress (Buffy the Vampire Slayer)
- O.T. Genasis – rapper
- Inara George – singer and musician (The Bird and the Bee)
- Paul George − professional basketball player (Philadelphia 76ers)
- Kaia Gerber − model
- Lauren German – actress (Lucifer)
- Gina Gershon – actress and singer
- Jason Giambi – professional baseball player (New York Yankees)
- Greg Gibson – Olympic Greco-Roman wrestler
- Tyrese Gibson – actor and singer (Fast & Furious)
- Frank Gifford – football player and sportscaster
- Brad Gilbert – tennis player and coach
- Melissa Gilbert – actress (Little House on the Prairie) and producer
- Sara Gilbert – actress (Roseanne)
- Lillian Moller Gilbreth – engineer (Cheaper by the Dozen)
- Justin Gimelstob – tennis player
- Giveon – singer
- Enver Gjokaj – actor
- Danny Glover – actor
- Donald Glover – actor and singer
- Gnash – rapper and singer
- Jared Goff – NFL quarterback
- Bill Goldberg – professional NFL football player and undefeated professional wrestler
- Chelsey Goldberg – hockey player
- Rube Goldberg – cartoonist
- Paul Goldstein (born 1976) – tennis player and coach
- Tony Goldwyn – actor (Ghost, Law & Order, Scandal, Tarzan)
- Selena Gomez – actress
- Phillip Gonyea – drummer and percussionist (Before the Mourning, Against All Will)
- Adrián González – baseball player
- Tony Gonzalez – NFL tight end
- Meagan Good – actress
- Drew Gooden – professional basketball player (Cleveland Cavaliers)
- Aaron Gordon – professional basketball player
- Jeff Gordon – NASCAR driver
- Molly Gordon – actress
- Robby Gordon – NASCAR driver
- Joseph Gordon-Levitt – actor
- Isidora Goreshter – actress
- Marjoe Gortner – evangelical minister
- Mark-Paul Gosselaar – actor (Saved by the Bell, NYPD Blue)
- Ben Gottschalk – National Football League offensive lineman
- Jim Grabb – tennis player ranked World No. 1 in doubles
- John Grabow – Major League Baseball player (Chicago Cubs)
- Kevin Graf – football offensive tackle
- Gloria Grahame – actress
- Andy Grammer – singer
- Farley Granger – actor
- Jennifer Granholm – Canadian-born politician, former governor of Michigan (2003–2011) and former United States Secretary of Energy (2021–2025)
- Beatrice Gray – actress
- Billy Gray – actor and motorcyclist
- Paul Gray – musician (Slipknot)
- Devon Graye – actor
- Brian Grazer – Academy Award–winning film and television producer
- Erick Green (born 1991) – basketball player in the Israeli Basketball Premier League
- Shawn Green – Major League Baseball two-time All-Star outfielder
- Alex Greenwald – musician
- Joanie Greggains – radio show host, health, and fitness expert
- Sasha Grey – pornographic actress
- Nash Grier – Viner, YouTuber, and actor
- Merv Griffin – talk show host, singer, and television producer (Jeopardy!, Wheel of Fortune)
- Florence Griffith Joyner – track athlete
- RL Grime – music producer
- Camryn Grimes – actress (The Young and the Restless)
- Josh Groban – singer
- Ashley Grossman (born 1993) – water-polo player
- Kim Gruenenfelder – author
- Vince Guaraldi – musician (A Charlie Brown Christmas)
- Kimberly Guilfoyle – television personality
- Natalie Gulbis – golfer
- Brett Gurewitz – guitarist (Bad Religion)
- Alfred Guth (1908–1996) – Austrian-born American water-polo player, swimmer, and Olympic modern pentathlete
- Sharina Gutierrez – model
- Tony Gwynn – Hall of Fame baseball player
- Jake Gyllenhaal – actor

== H ==
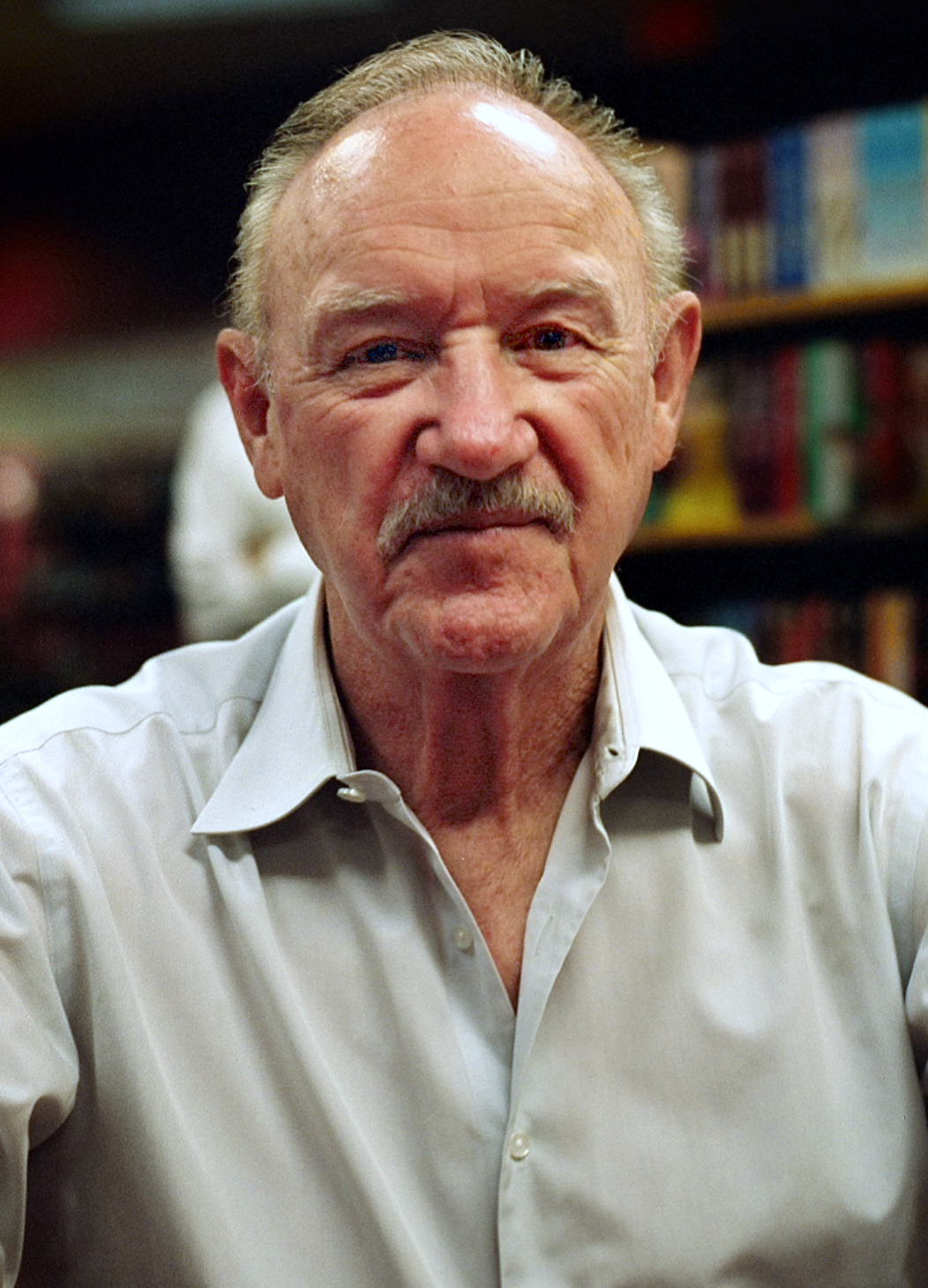
Gene Hackman

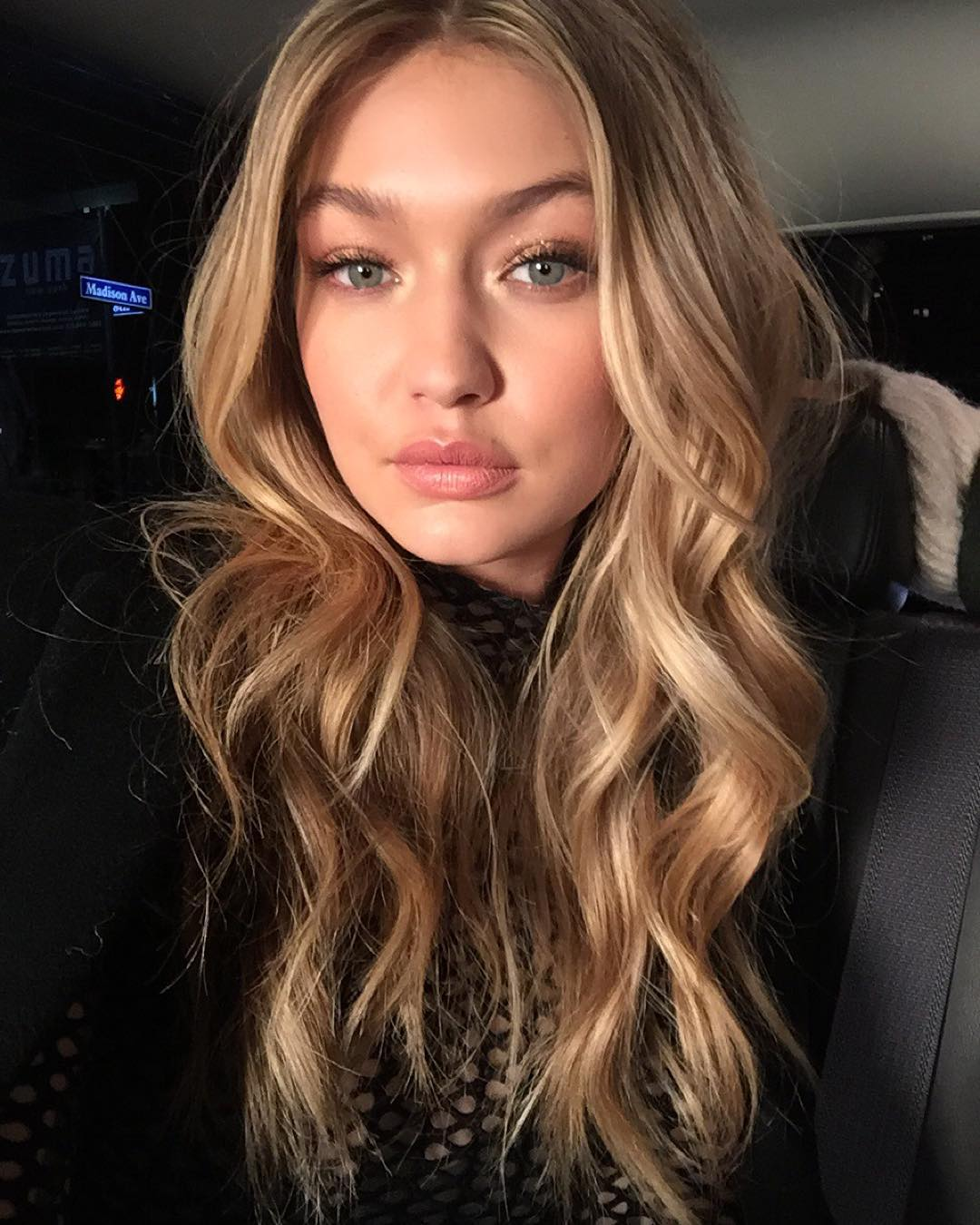
Gigi Hadid

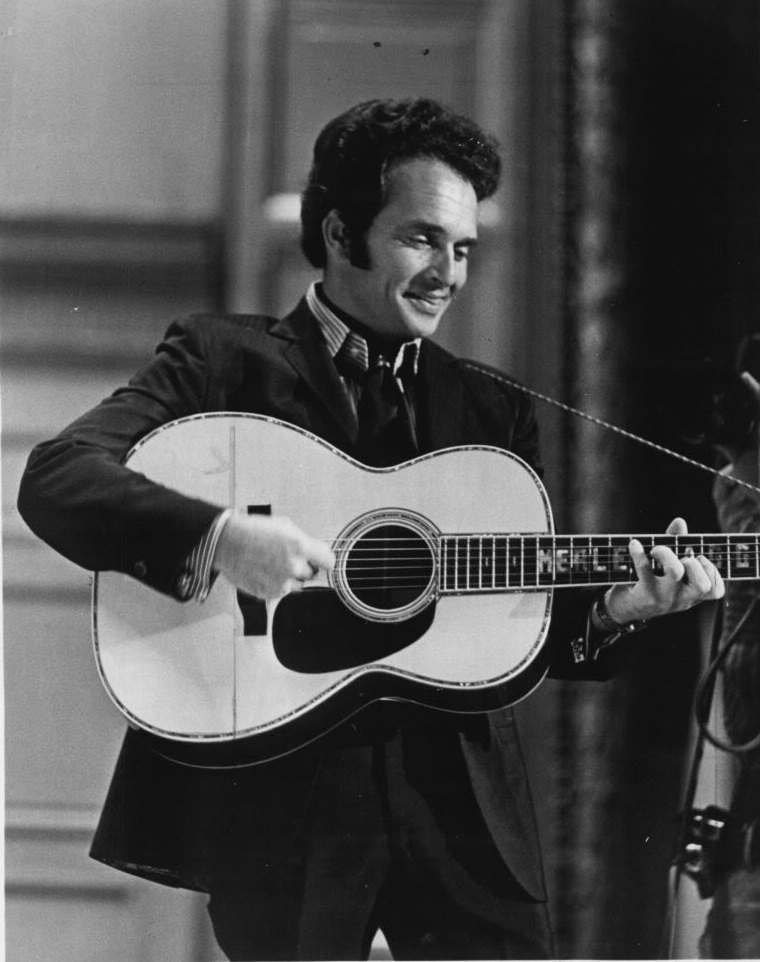
Merle Haggard

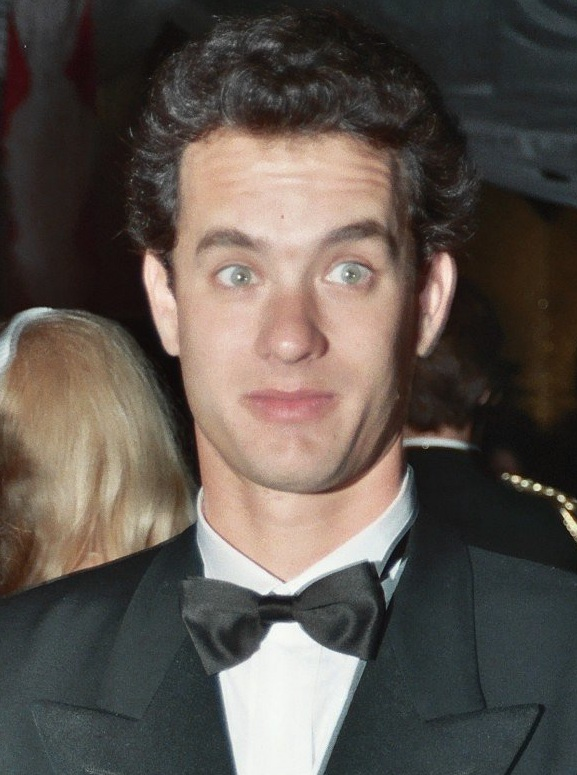
Tom Hanks

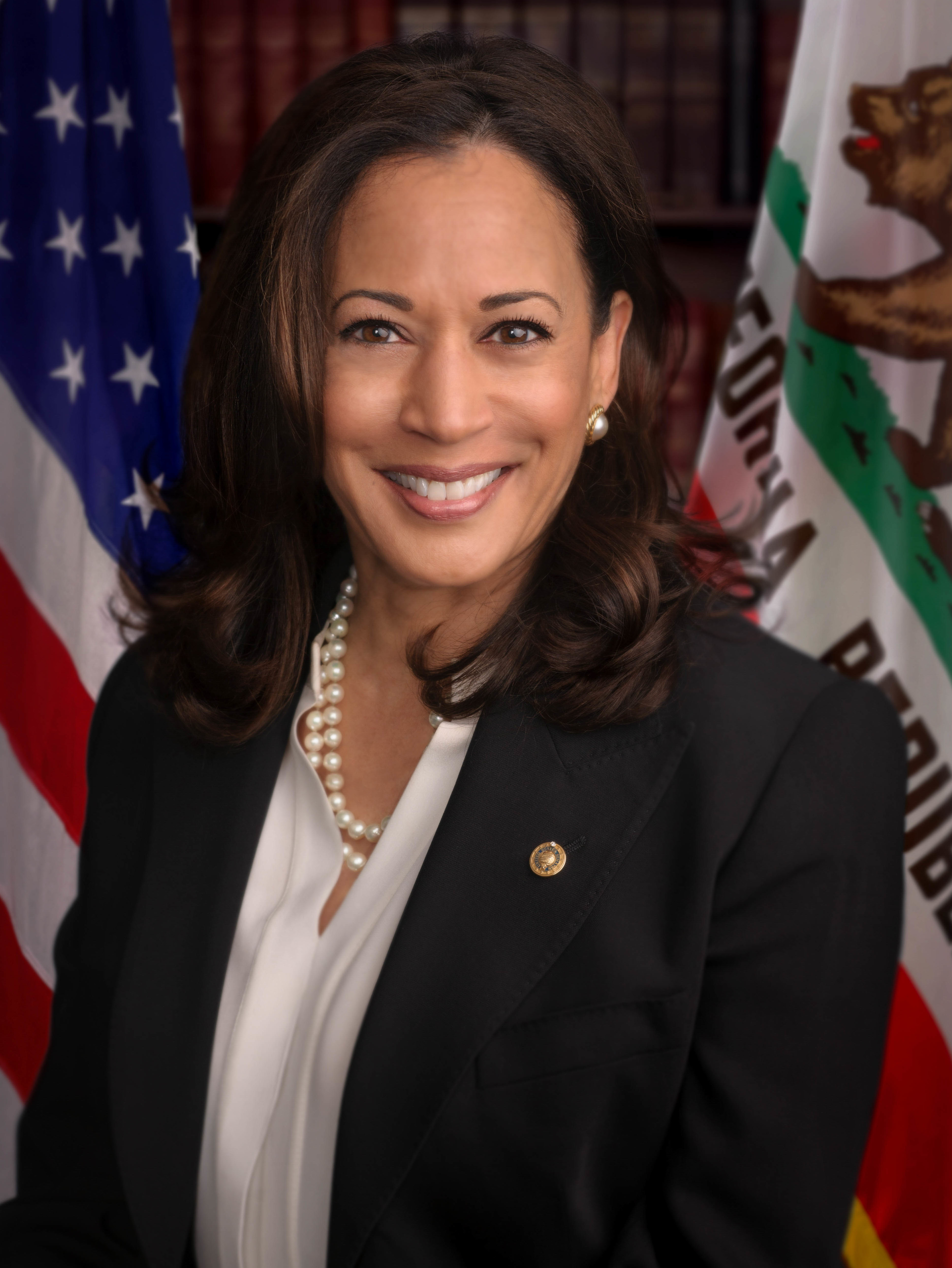
Kamala Harris

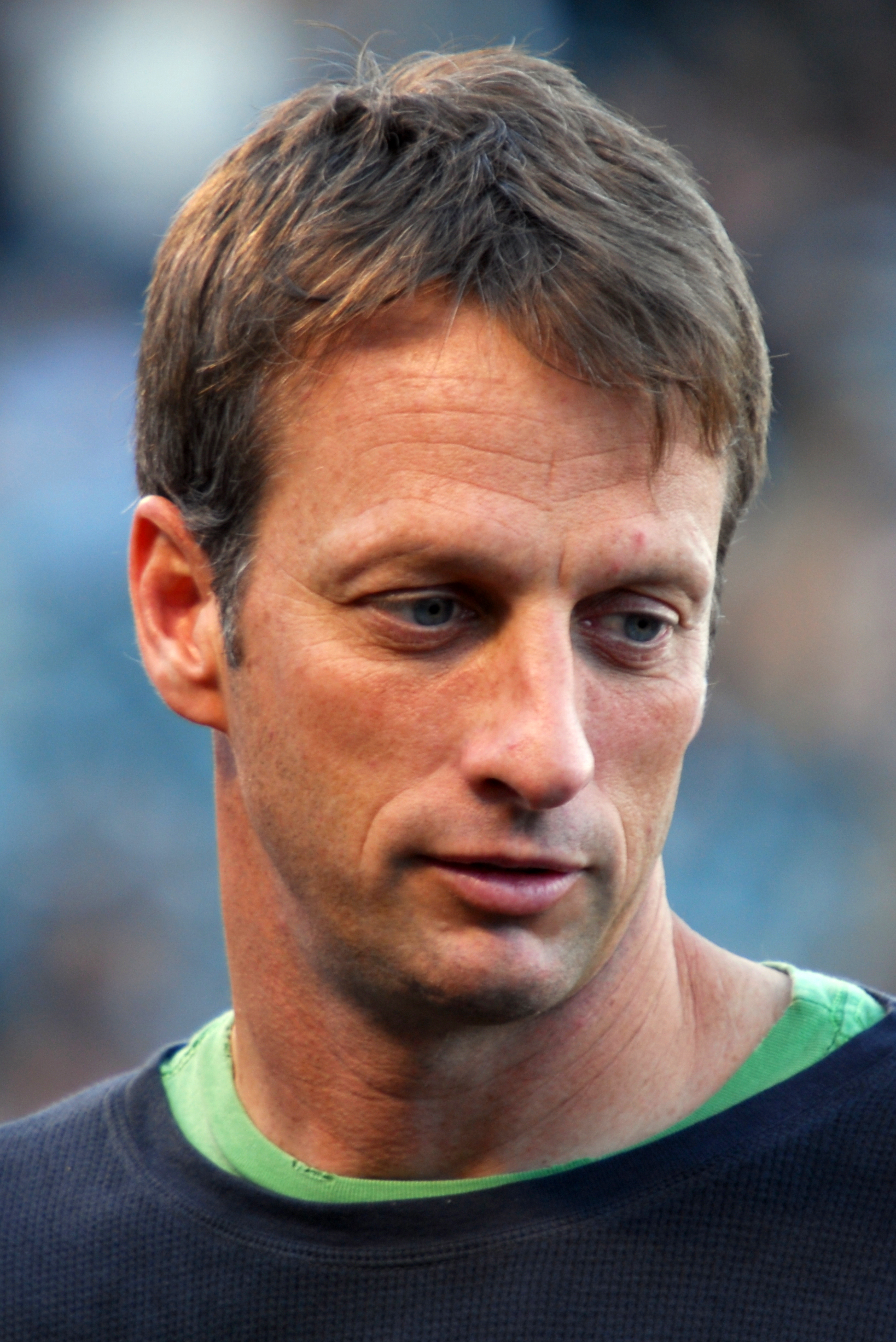
Tony Hawk

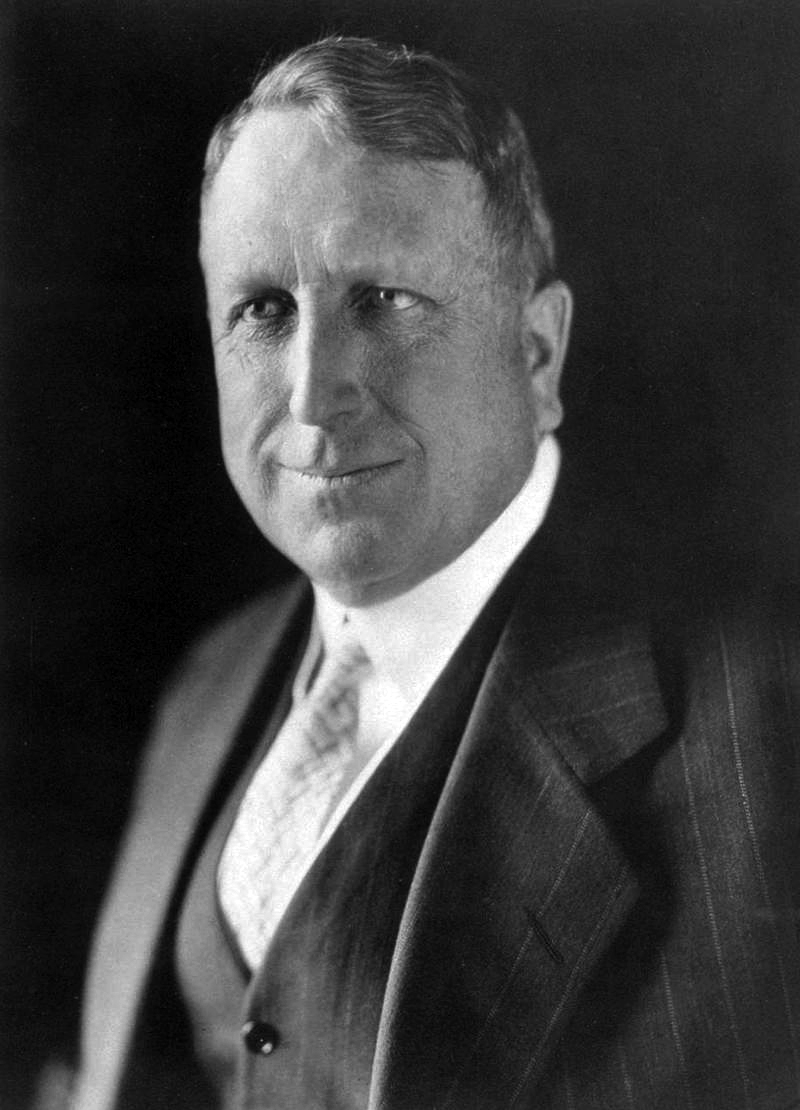
William Randolph Hearst

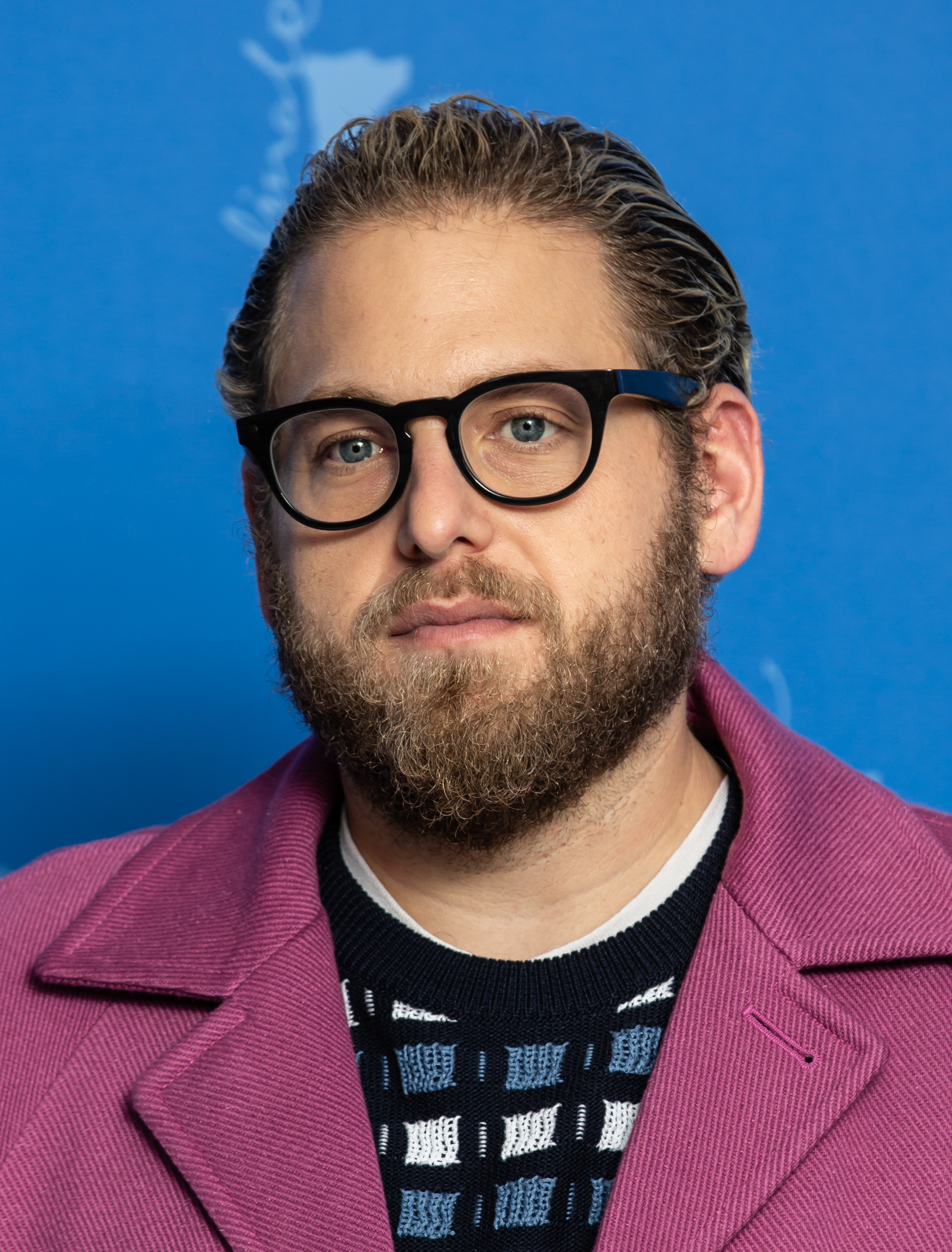
Jonah Hill

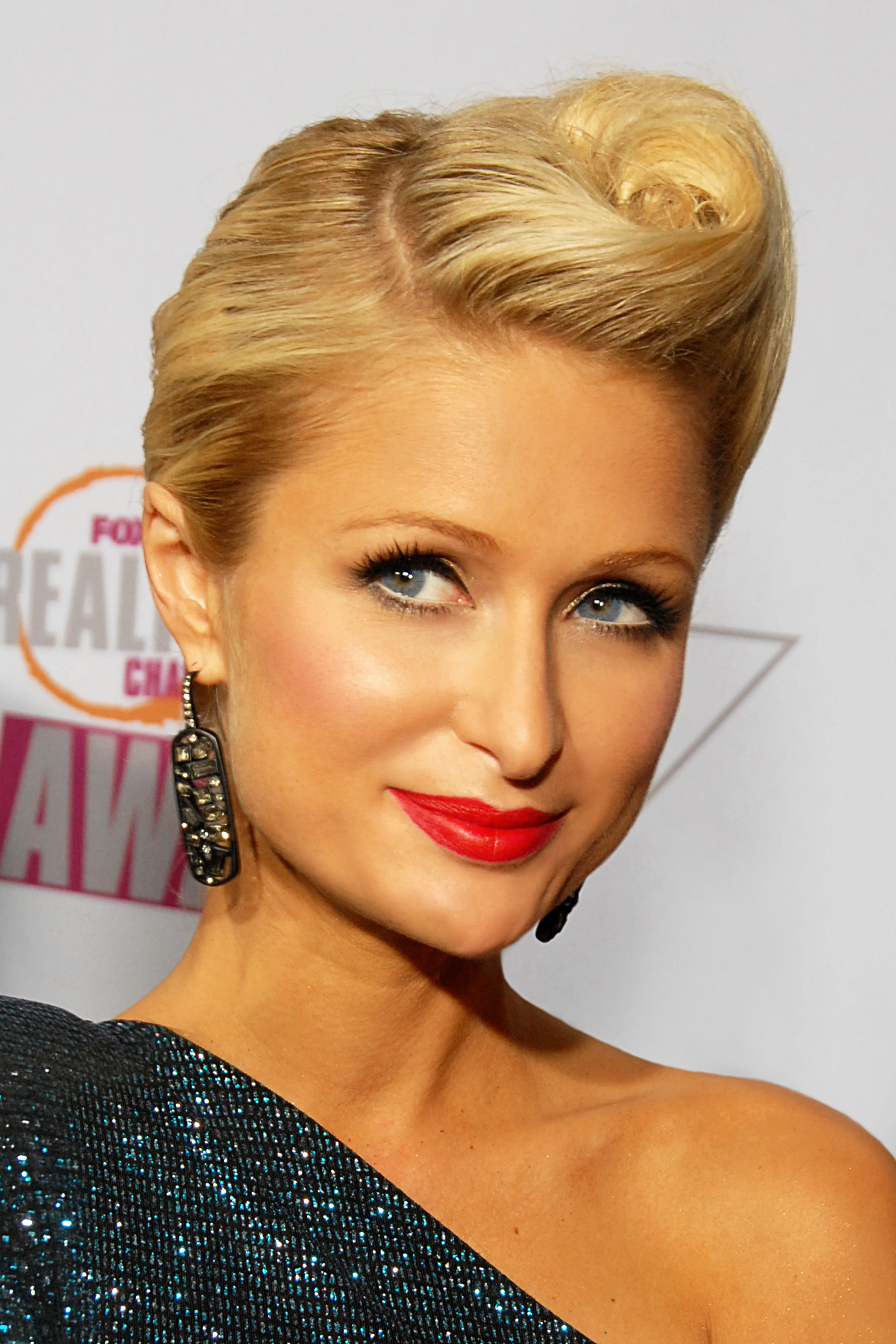
Paris Hilton

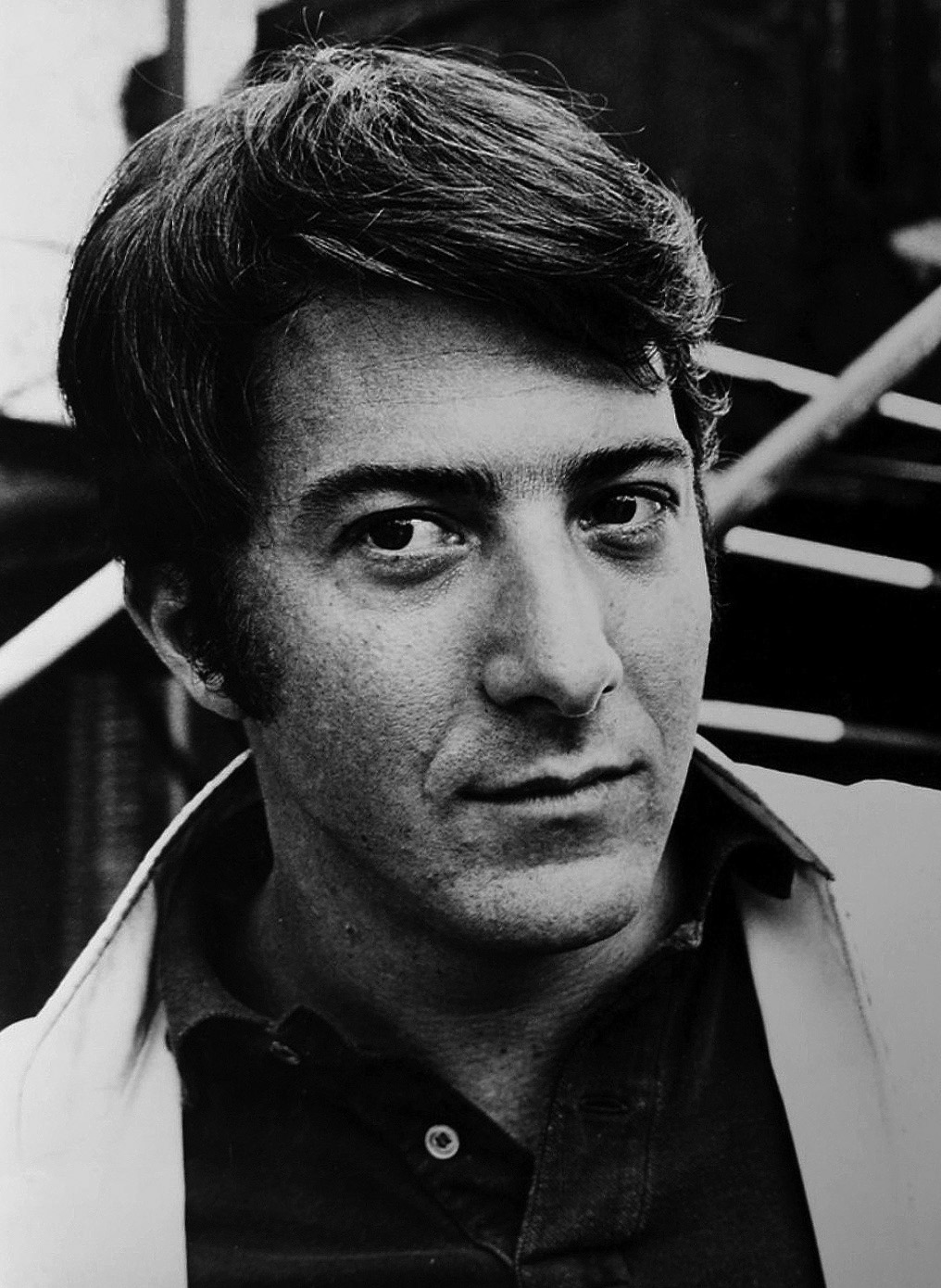
Dustin Hoffman

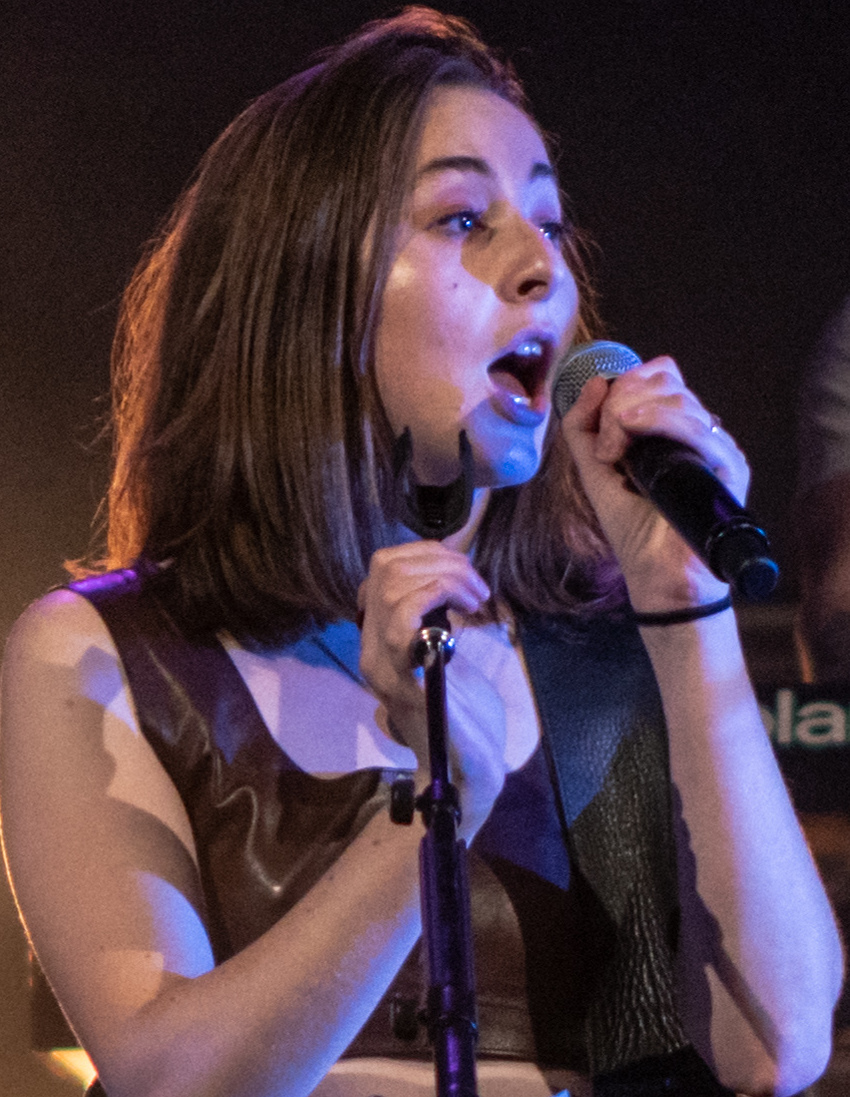
Alana Haim

- Walter A. Haas Jr. – chief executive officer of Levi Strauss & Co.
- Steven C. Hackett – economist (Humboldt State University)
- Gene Hackman – actor (The French Connection)
- Tiffany Haddish – comedian
- Bella Hadid – model
- Gigi Hadid – model
- Sammy Hagar – musician (Van Halen)
- Merle Haggard – country music singer
- Joseph Hahn – painter, director, and musician (Linkin Park)
- Alana Haim – musician and actress
- Danielle Haim – musician
- Jackie Earle Haley – actor (Bad News Bears)
- Mark Hamill – actor (Star Wars)
- Jordan Hamilton (born 1990) – basketball player in the Israel Basketball Premier League
- Laird Hamilton – surfer
- Amelia Gray Hamlin – model
- Harry Hamlin – actor (Clash of the Titans, L.A. Law)
- Armie Hammer – actor
- Kirk Hammett – musician (Metallica)
- Jonathan Hammond – filmmaker (We All Die Alone)
- Daniel Handler – author, pen name Lemony Snicket
- Chet Hanks – actor and musician
- Colin Hanks – actor (Fargo, King Kong)
- Tom Hanks – actor, director, and producer
- Gabbie Hanna – Internet personality, singer-songwriter
- Peter D. Hannaford – author and political advisor to Ronald Reagan
- Jeff Hanneman – guitarist (Slayer)
- Kay Hansen – mixed martial artist
- James Harden – basketball player (Los Angeles Clippers)
- Marcia Gay Harden – actress
- Ian Harding – actor (Pretty Little Liars)
- Dan Haren – professional baseball player (Oakland Athletics)
- Mariska Hargitay – actress (Law & Order: Special Victims Unit)
- Jeff B. Harmon – film producer, director, and actor
- Mark Harmon – actor
- Kamala Harris – 49th vice president of the United States (2021–2025); U.S. senator from California (2017–2021)
- Henry Harrower – endocrinologist
- Julia Hartz – entrepreneur
- Kevin Harvick – NASCAR driver
- Teri Hatcher – actress (Desperate Housewives)
- Henry Hathaway – film director
- Davey Havok – lead singer of AFI
- Tony Hawk – skateboarder
- Kristy Hawkins – IFBB professional bodybuilder
- Lyn-Z Adams Hawkins – professional skateboarder
- Julie Hayek – Miss USA 1983
- Dennis Haysbert – actor (24)
- Jenna Haze – pornographic actress
- Patty Hearst – actress and newspaper heiress (Symbionese Liberation Army)
- William Randolph Hearst – newspaper publisher
- Ian Hecox – YouTuber
- Max Heidegger (born 1997) – American-Israeli basketball player in the Israeli Basketball Premier League
- Simon Helberg – actor and comedian (The Big Bang Theory)
- Julie Heldman – tennis player (ranked #5 in the world)
- Mariel Hemingway – actress (Manhattan)
- Christy Hemme – professional wrestler and model
- David Henrie – actor
- Sek Henry (born 1987) – professional basketball player, 2018 Israeli Basketball Premier League MVP
- Pamela Hensley – actress
- H.E.R. – singer
- Faithe Herman – actress (This Is Us, Shazam!)
- Jay Hernandez – actor (Magnum P.I.)
- Keith Hernandez – baseball player
- Mirelle Hernández – make-up artist (Fear the Walking Dead)
- Barbara Hershey – actress
- James Hetfield – musician (Metallica)
- Andy Hill (born c. 1950) – three-time college national champion basketball player, president of CBS Productions and Channel One News, author, and motivational speaker
- Jonah Hill – actor
- Paris Hilton – celebrity, model, actress, and DJ
- Nico Hiraga – skateboarder
- Emile Hirsch – actor
- Jason Hirsh – baseball player
- Hit-Boy – rapper and record producer
- David Hoberman – film director and producer, and founder of Mandeville Films
- Douglas Hodge – CEO of PIMCO; charged with fraud for allegedly participating in the 2019 college admissions bribery scandal
- Dustin Hoffman – actor
- Trevor Hoffman – professional baseball player (San Diego Padres)
- Amber L. Hollibaugh – writer and filmmaker
- Dexter Holland – singer and musician (The Offspring)
- Brenda Holloway – singer-songwriter
- Josh Holloway – actor (Lost)
- James Holmes – convicted gunman of the 2012 Aurora, Colorado, shooting
- Mike Holmgren – football coach (Seattle Seahawks)
- Dennis Holt – poet, linguist, and translator
- Max Homa (born 1990) – professional golfer on the PGA Tour
- Dennis Hopper – actor and director (Easy Rider, Speed)
- Mark Hoppus – singer and musician (Blink-182)
- Hopsin – rapper, actor, and record producer
- Cody Horn – actress
- James Horner – composer
- Nick Hornsby (born 1995) – basketball player for Hapoel Be'er Sheva in the Israeli Basketball Premier League
- Rhys Hoskins – Major League Baseball player
- Benjamin Howard – filmmaker (Riley)
- Bryce Dallas Howard – actress
- C. Thomas Howell – actor (The Outsiders, Red Dawn, Southland)
- Jerry Hsu – skateboarder
- Stephanie Hsu – actress
- Trevor Huddleston – NASCAR driver
- Huddy – social-media personality
- Vanessa Hudgens – actress and singer (High School Musical)
- Kate Hudson – actress
- Oliver Hudson – actor
- Phil Hughes – baseball player
- Yolanda Hughes-Heying – IFBB professional bodybuilder
- Barry Hunau – illustrator
- William Hung – American Idol contestant
- Helen Hunt – actress
- Terry Huntingdon – Miss USA 1959
- Justin Hurwitz – composer
- Nipsey Hussle – rapper
- Anjelica Huston – actress
- Nyjah Huston – professional skateboarder
- Timothy Hutton – actor
- Tiffany Hwang – singer (Girls' Generation)

== I ==
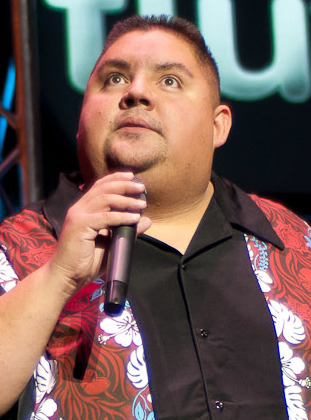
Gabriel Iglesias

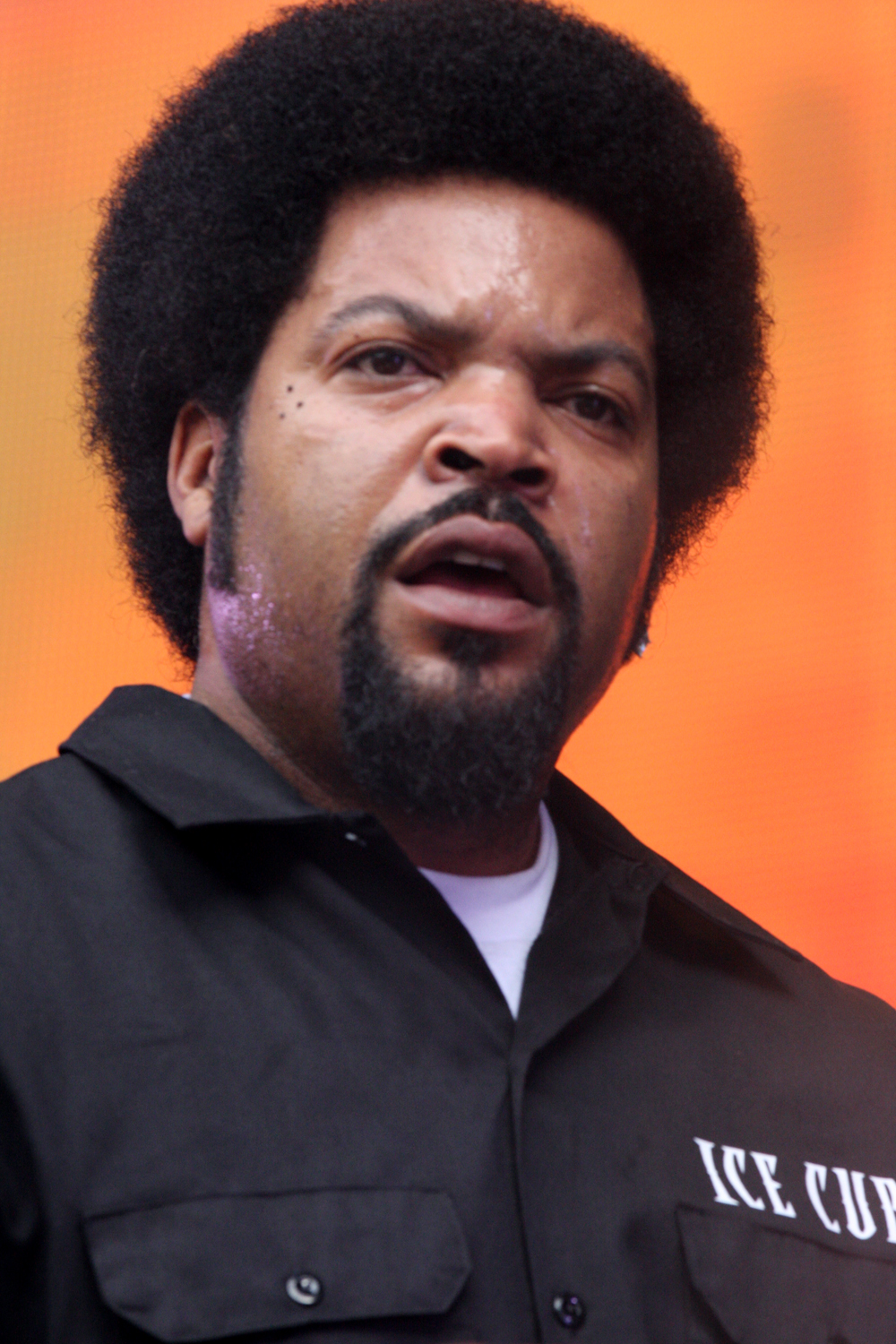
Ice Cube

- Ruby Ibarra – Filipino-born rapper
- Ice Cube – musician and actor
- Ice-T – rapper, songwriter, actor, and producer (Law & Order: Special Victims Unit)
- Gabriel Iglesias – comedian
- iLoveMakonnen – rapper, singer, and record producer
- Danny Im – member of Korean music group 1TYM
- Grant Imahara – electronics and r Imus – radio personality
- Sabrina Ionescu – basketball player (New York Liberty)
- Allison Iraheta – singer (American Idol)
- Kathy Ireland – model
- Kiki Iriafen – basketball player (Washington Mystics)
- Bill Irwin – actor and clown
- Chris Isaak – musician and actor
- Yasuhiro Ishimoto – photographer
- Nick Itkin (born 1999) – Olympic two-time bronze medalist foil fencer, junior world champion
- Phil Ivey – professional poker player

== J ==
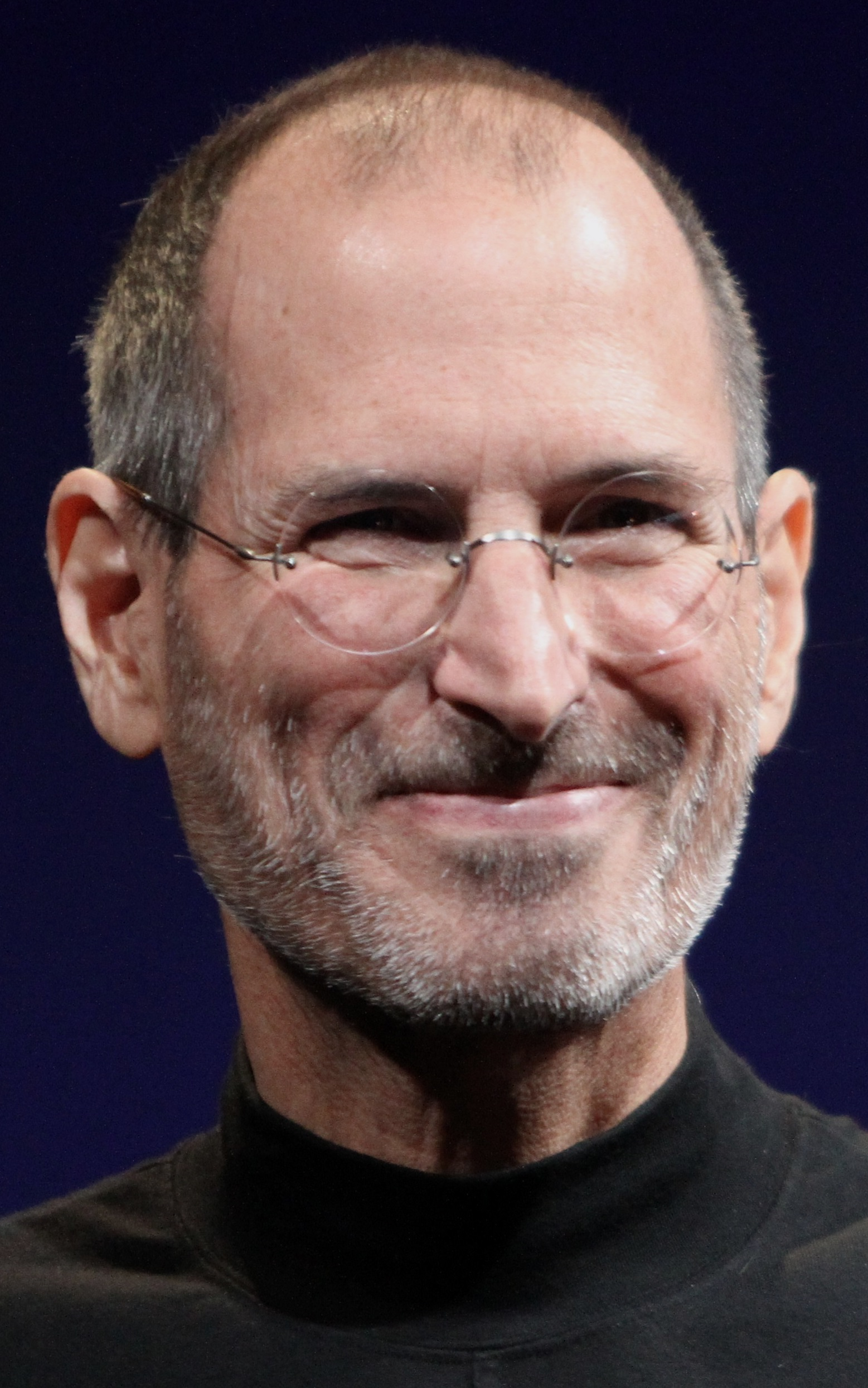
Steve Jobs

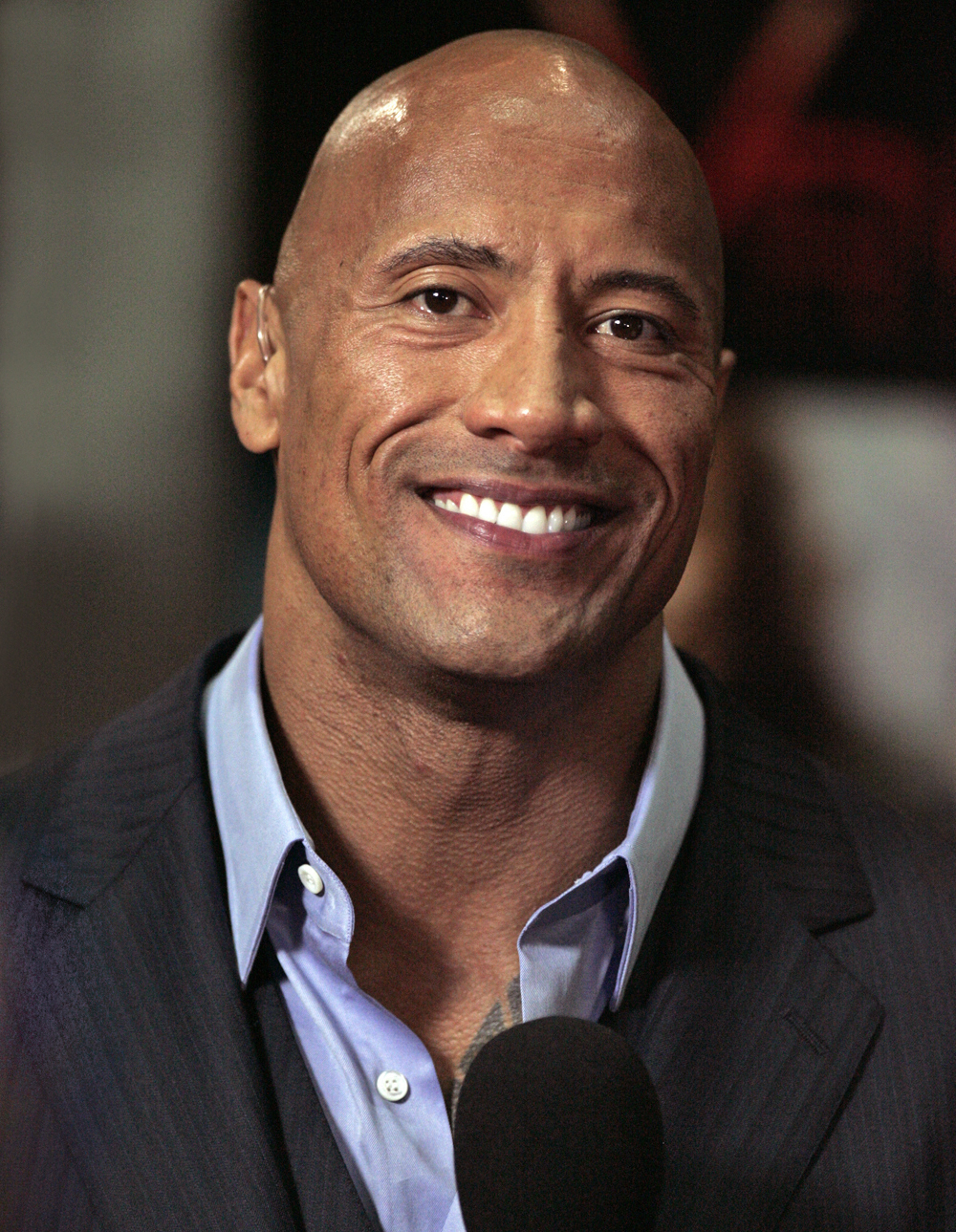
Dwayne Johnson

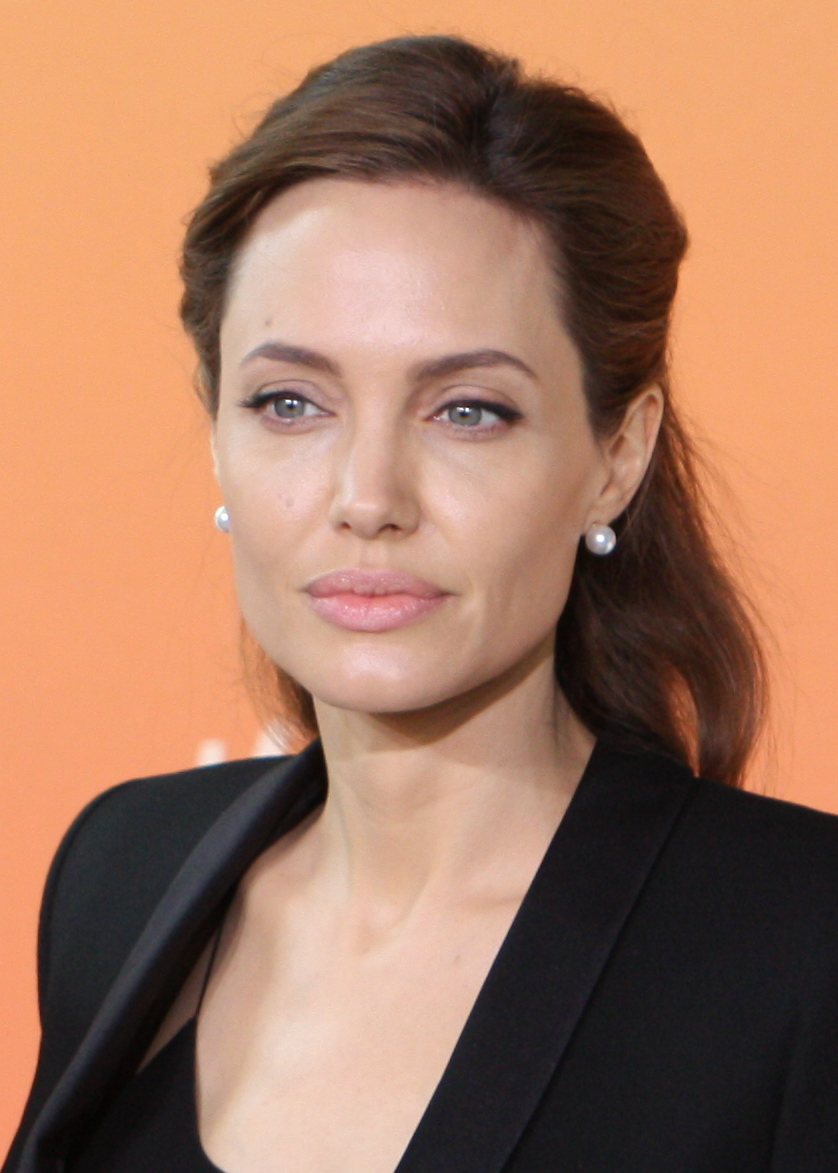
Angelina Jolie

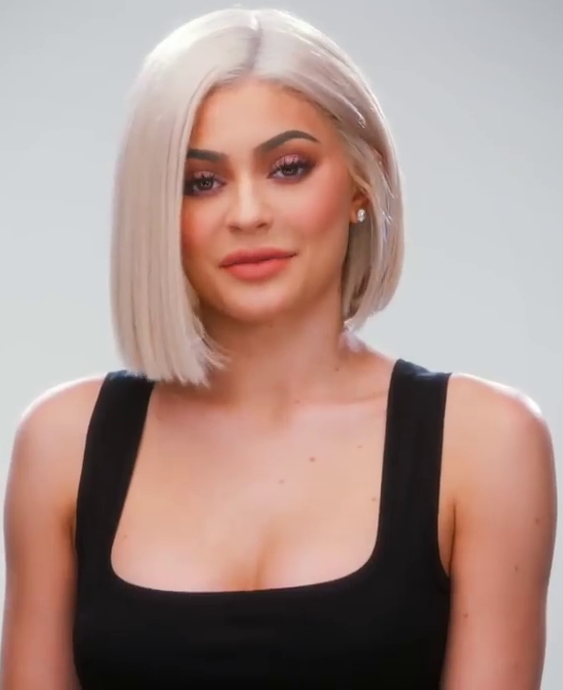
Kylie Jenner

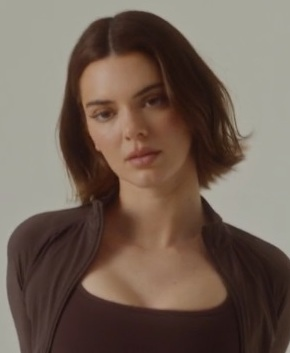
Kendall Jenner

- Shirley Jackson (1916–1965) – author
- Skai Jackson – actress
- Jordan Jacobo – actor and screenwriter
- Helen Jacobs (1908–1997) – tennis player ranked world #1
- Marielle Jaffe – actress
- Etta James – singer
- Jesse James – actor, welder, and chief executive officer of West Coast Choppers
- Tom Jancar – contemporary art dealer (Jancar Kuhlenschmidt Gallery)
- Dinah Jane – singer (Fifth Harmony)
- Gregg Jarrett – lawyer and journalist
- Jazzmun – actress
- BC Jean – singer
- Davon Jefferson (born 1986) – basketball player in the Israeli Basketball Premier League
- Richard Jefferson – professional basketball player and commentator
- Chantel Jeffries – model
- Fran Jeffries – actress (The Pink Panther)
- Kendall Jenner – model, and reality-television personality
- Kris Jenner – reality-television personality
- Kylie Jenner – model, reality-television and social-media personality
- David Ji – Chinese-American electronics entrepreneur who co-founded Apex Digital, and was held against his will in China for months without charges during a business dispute
- Steve Jobs – computer pioneer and co-founder of Apple Computer
- Anjelah Johnson – actress and comedian
- Ashley Johnson – actress (Growing Pains, The Last of Us, Blindspot)
- Dwayne Johnson – professional wrestler best known as "The Rock"; actor (The Fast and the Furious)
- Jimmie Johnson – NASCAR driver and champion
- Kevin Johnson – basketball player and politician
- Keyshawn Johnson – football player
- Randy Johnson – baseball player
- Angelina Jolie – actress
- Haley Jones – basketball player (Dallas Wings)
- Jerry Jones – owner of the Dallas Cowboys
- Marion Jones – track athlete
- Matt Jones – actor (Breaking Bad) and comedian
- Rashida Jones – actress
- Tamala Jones – actress
- Sharon Jordan – actress (The Suite Life of Zack & Cody)
- Ashley Judd – actress
- Aaron Judge – baseball player
- Krystal Jung (born Chrystal Soo Jung) – actress and singer (f(x))

== K ==
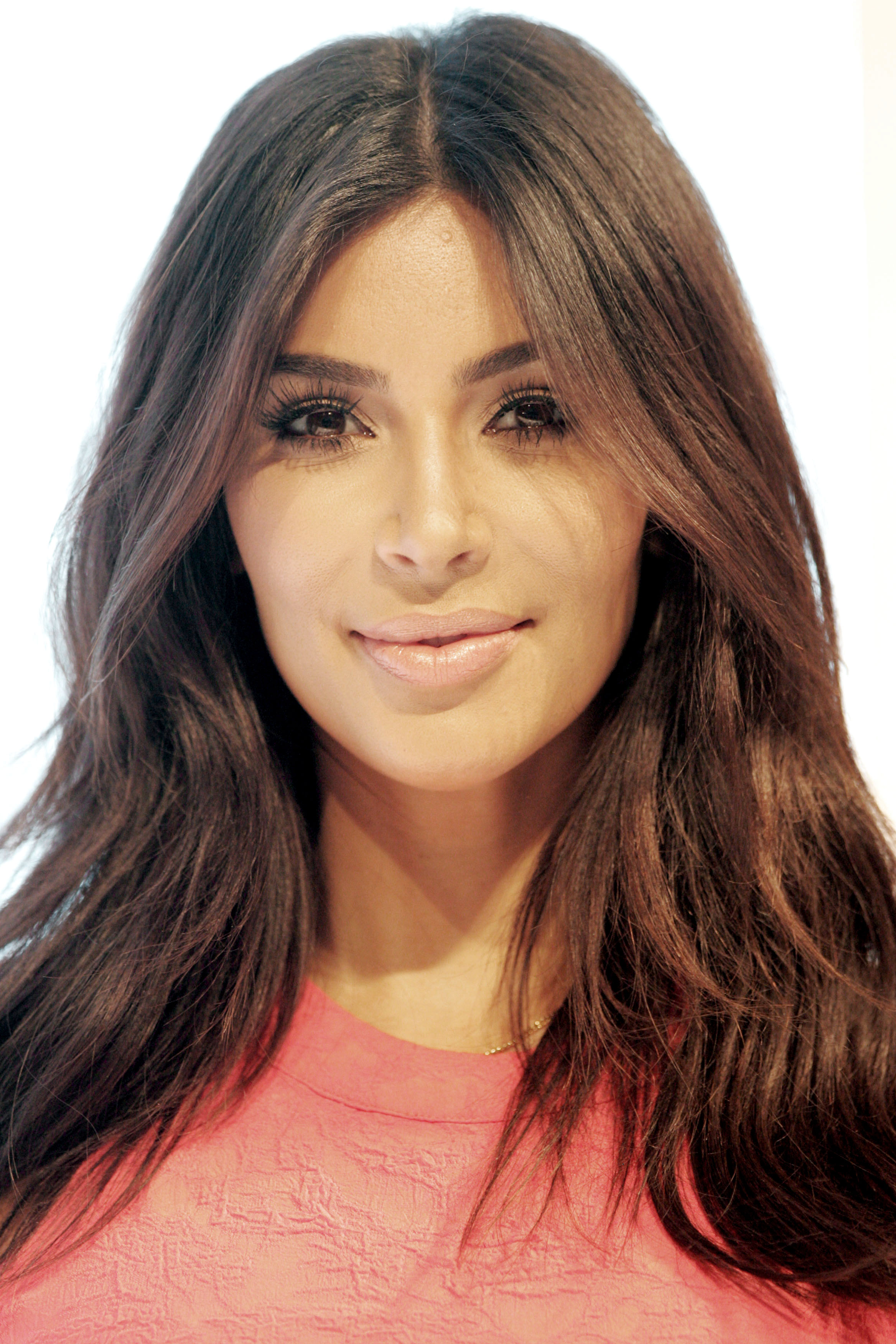
Kim Kardashian

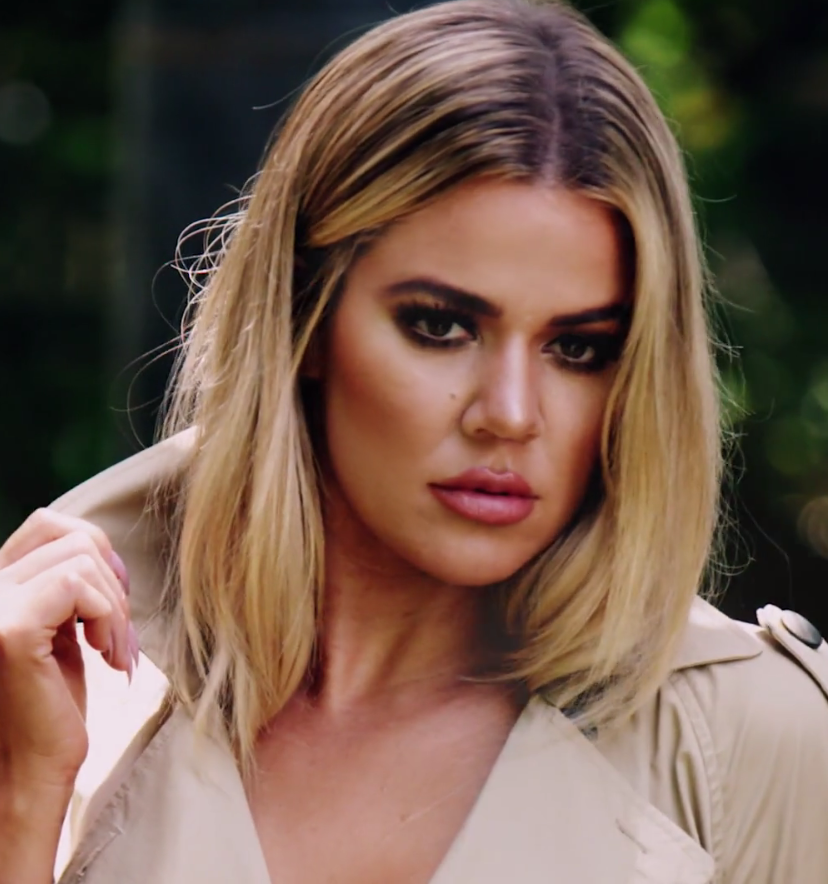
Khloé Kardashian

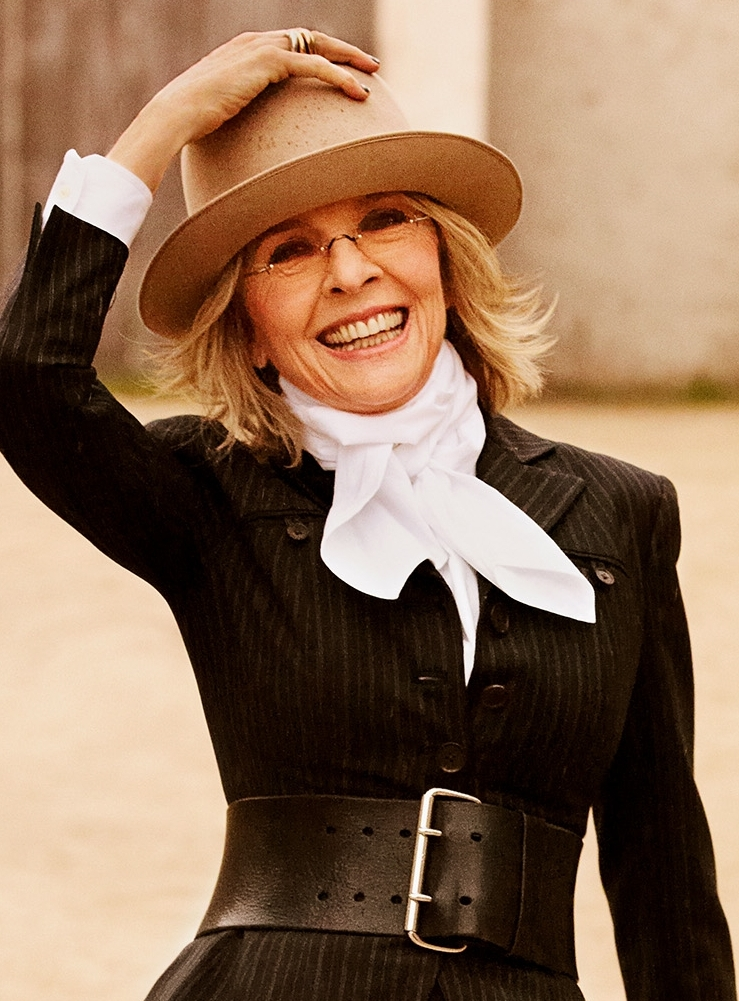
Diane Keaton

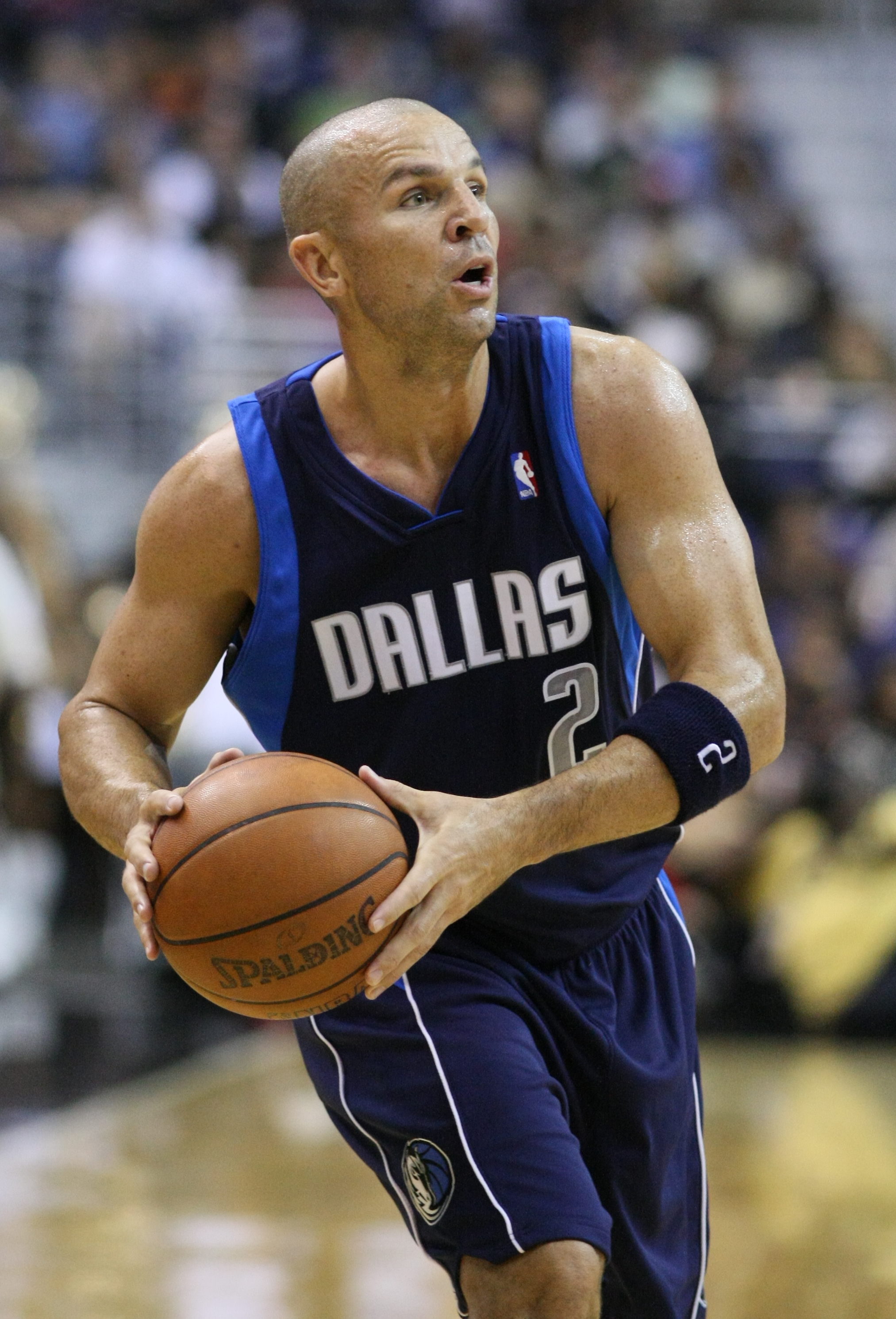
Jason Kidd

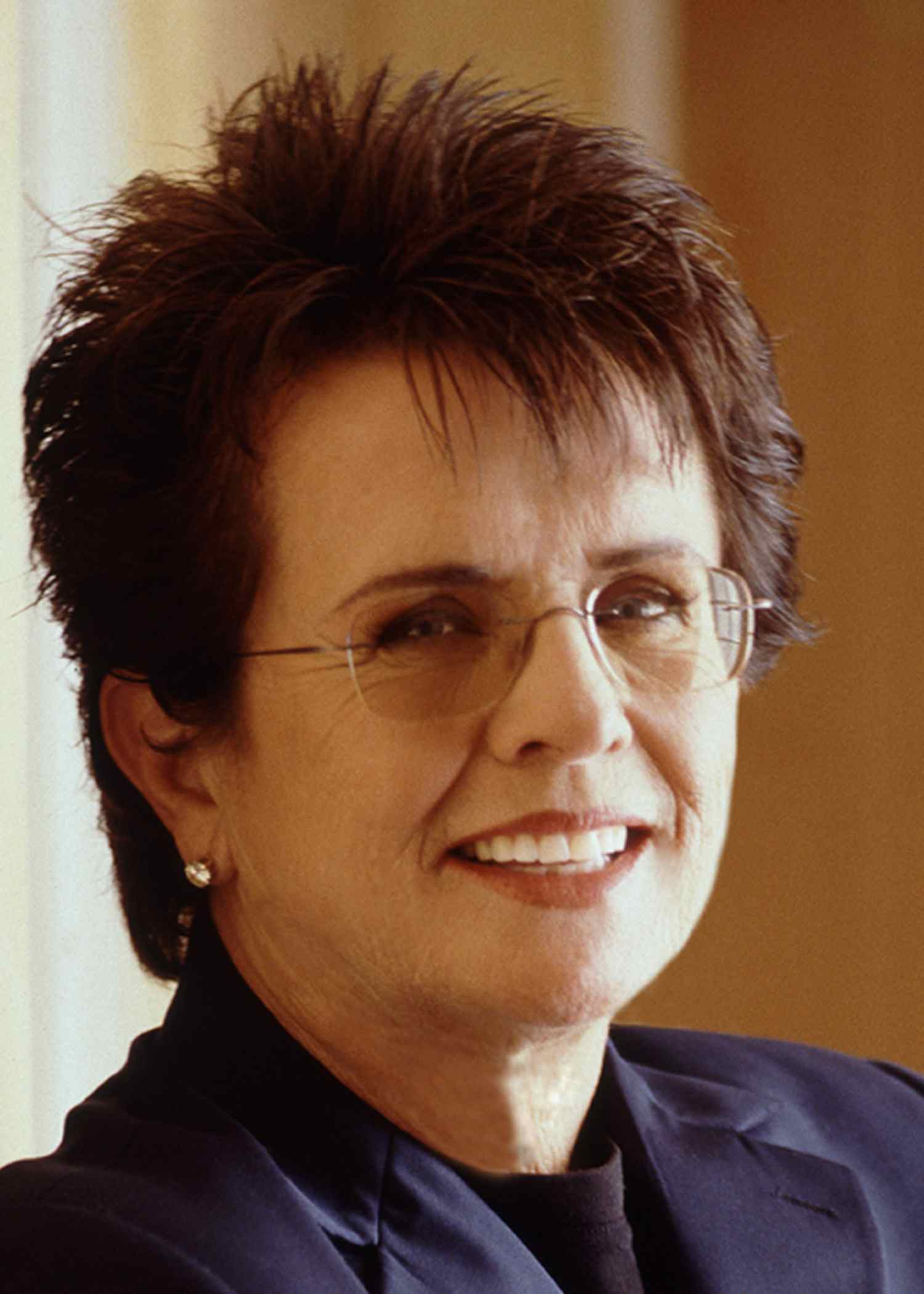
Billie Jean King

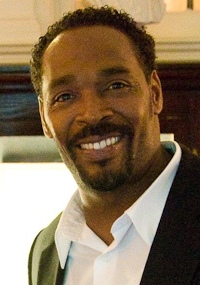
Rodney King

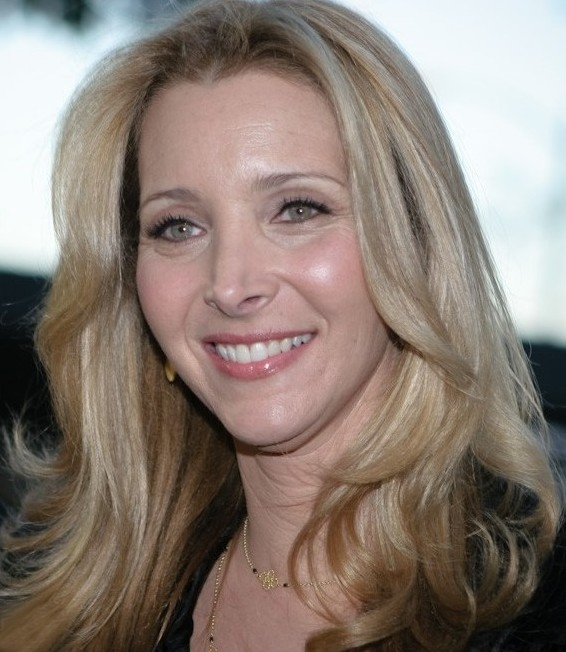
Lisa Kudrow

- Pauline Kael – film critic
- Colin Kaepernick – National Football League quarterback
- Ryan Kalish – Major League Baseball outfielder
- Tony Kanal – bassist with No Doubt
- Anita Kanter – tennis player ranked in world top 10
- Avi Kaplan – singer-songwriter
- Gabe Kapler – Major League Baseball outfielder, and manager of the San Francisco Giants
- Jason Kapono – former professional basketball player
- Carl Karcher – founder of Carl's Jr.
- Khloé Kardashian – socialite and reality-television personality
- Kim Kardashian – socialite and reality-television personality
- Kourtney Kardashian – socialite and reality-television personality
- Rob Kardashian – socialite and reality-television personality
- Robert Kardashian – attorney and businessman
- Terry Karl – professor of Latin American Studies at Stanford University
- Deena Kastor – Olympic runner
- Chris Kattan – actor and comedian
- Julie Kavner – actress (The Simpsons)
- Zoe Kazan – actress
- Diane Keaton – actress, director, and producer
- Keb' Mo' – blues singer-songwriter and guitarist
- Andrew Keegan – actor (10 Things I Hate About You)
- Baby Keem – rapper
- Kehlani – singer
- Eliza D. Keith – educator, suffragist, and journalist
- Sally Kellerman – actress
- Jamill Kelly – Olympic freestyle wrestler
- Minka Kelly – actress
- Edmund Kemper – serial killer
- Anthony Kennedy – Supreme Court justice
- Riley Keough – actress
- Kirk Kerkorian – investor and philanthropist
- Kesha – singer
- Jason Kidd – NBA player and coach (Dallas Mavericks)
- Val Kilmer – actor
- Down AKA Kilo – rapper
- Kevin Kiner – film and television composer
- Billie Jean King – tennis player
- Elle King
- Joey King – actress
- Kerry King – guitarist (Slayer)
- Regina King – actress
- Rodney King – police brutality victim
- Maxine Hong Kingston – author
- Thomas Kinkade – artist
- Hayley Kiyoko – singer-songwriter, dancer and actress
- Erwin Klein (died 1992) – table tennis player
- Perry Klein (born 1971) – NFL quarterback
- Alix Klineman (born 1989) – volleyball player
- Matthew Knight – actor
- Suge Knight – record producer and music executive (Death Row Records)
- Kyle Korver – basketball player
- Kira Kosarin – singer and actress (The Thundermans)
- Joel Kramer – basketball player
- Lynn Kramer – skateboarder
- Zoë Kravitz – actress
- Kreayshawn – rapper, singer and music video director
- Dean Kremer (born 1996) – Israeli-American Major League Baseball pitcher
- Nathan Kress – actor (iCarly)
- Kayden Kross – pornographic actress
- Mike Krukow – baseball pitcher and announcer (San Francisco Giants)
- Leo Krupnik (born 1979) – Ukrainian-born American-Israeli former soccer player and current soccer coach
- Cy Kuckenbaker – filmmaker
- Lisa Kudrow – actress (Friends)
- Raja Kumari – Indian-American rapper, songwriter, and singer
- Greg Kurstin – musician and producer (The Bird and the Bee)
- Alex Kurtzman – filmmaker (Transformers)
- Michelle Kwan – figure skater
- Iris Kyle – 10-time overall Ms. Olympia professional bodybuilder

== L ==
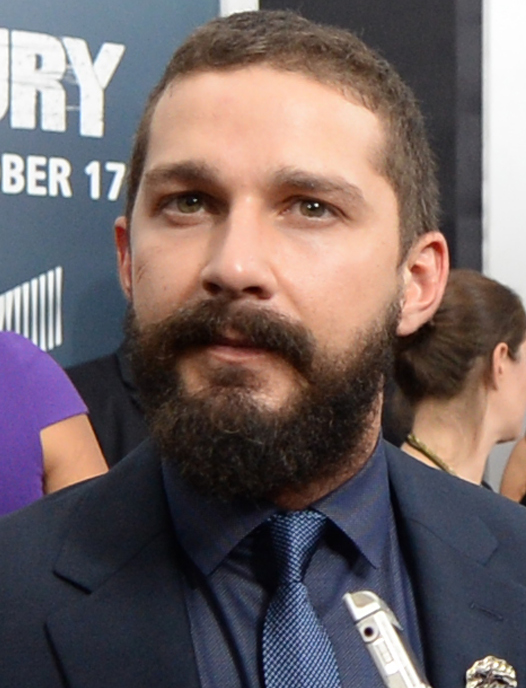
Shia LaBeouf

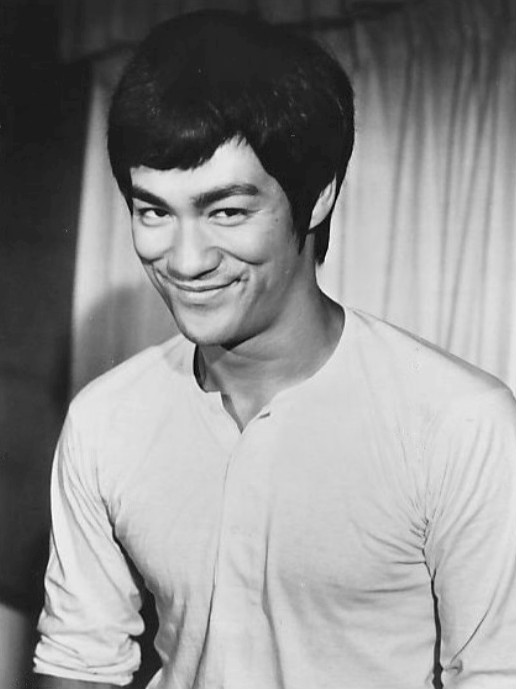
Bruce Lee

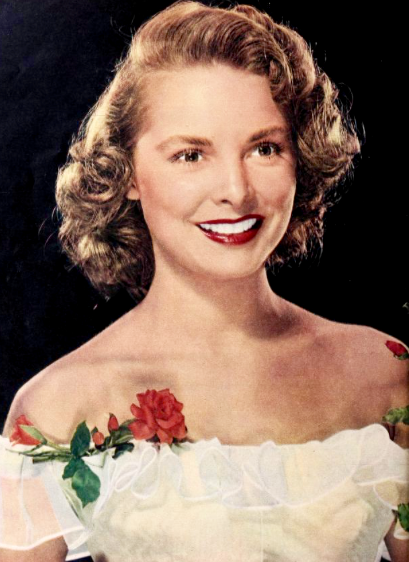
Janet Leigh

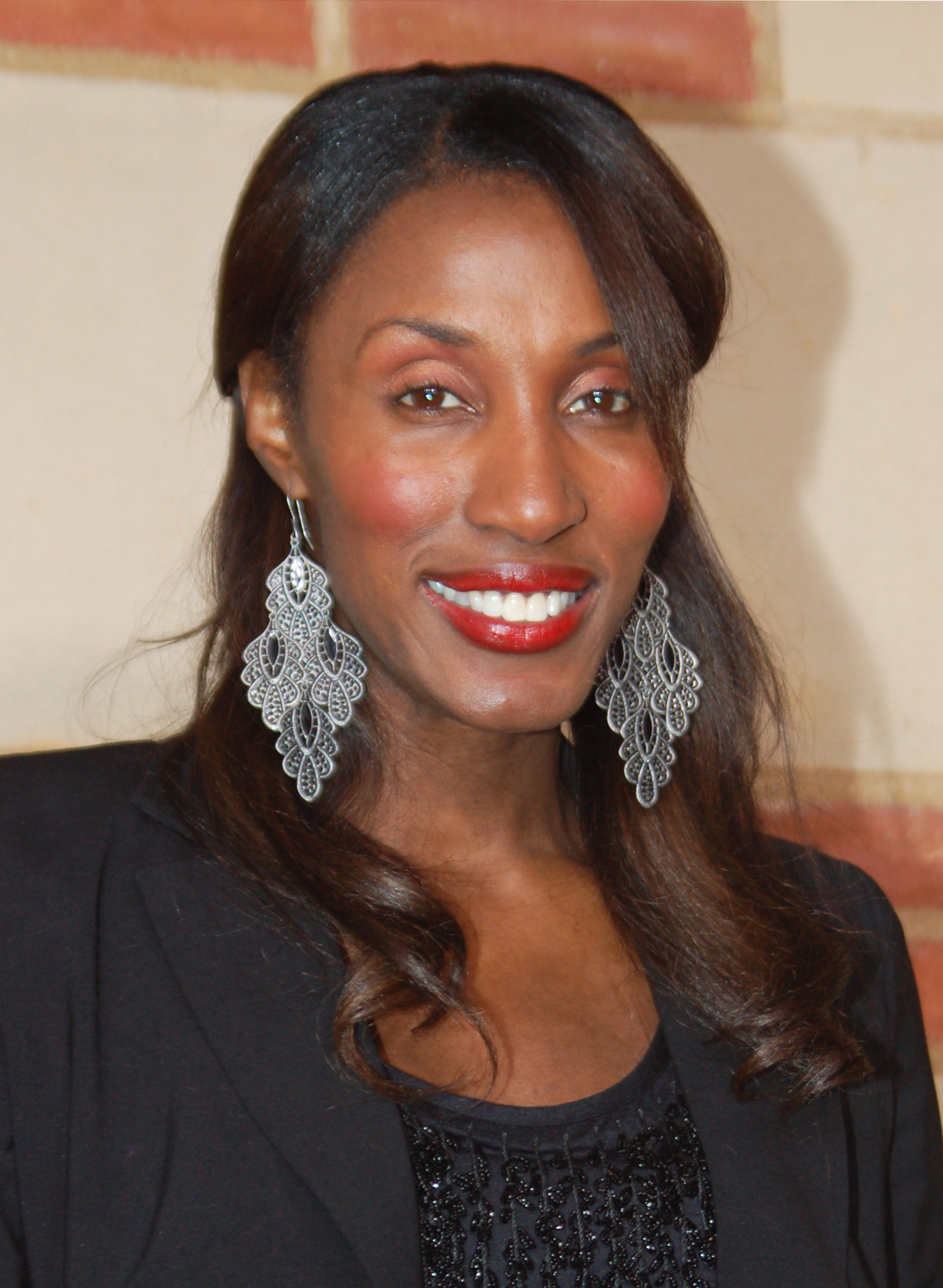
Lisa Leslie

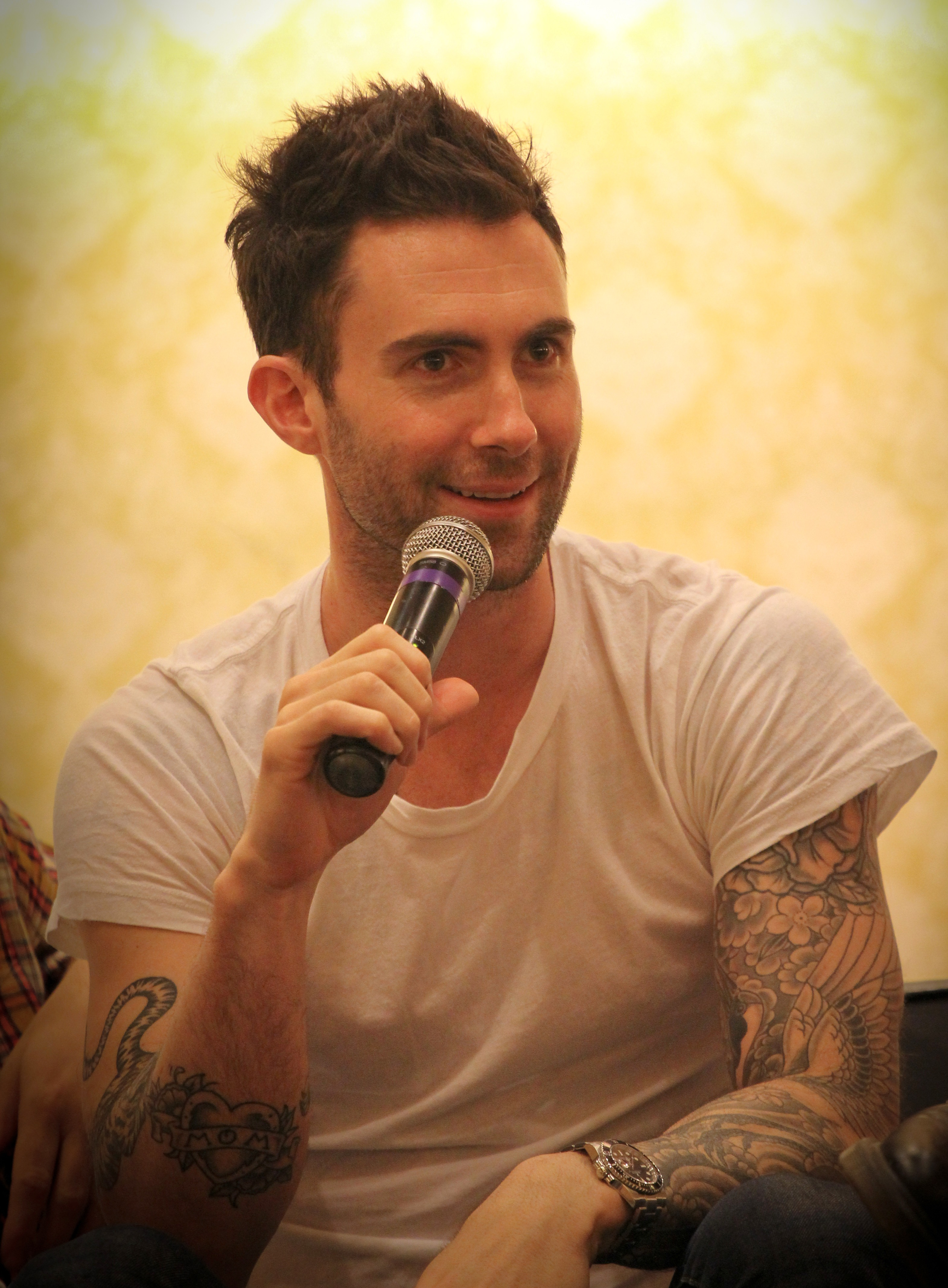
Adam Levine

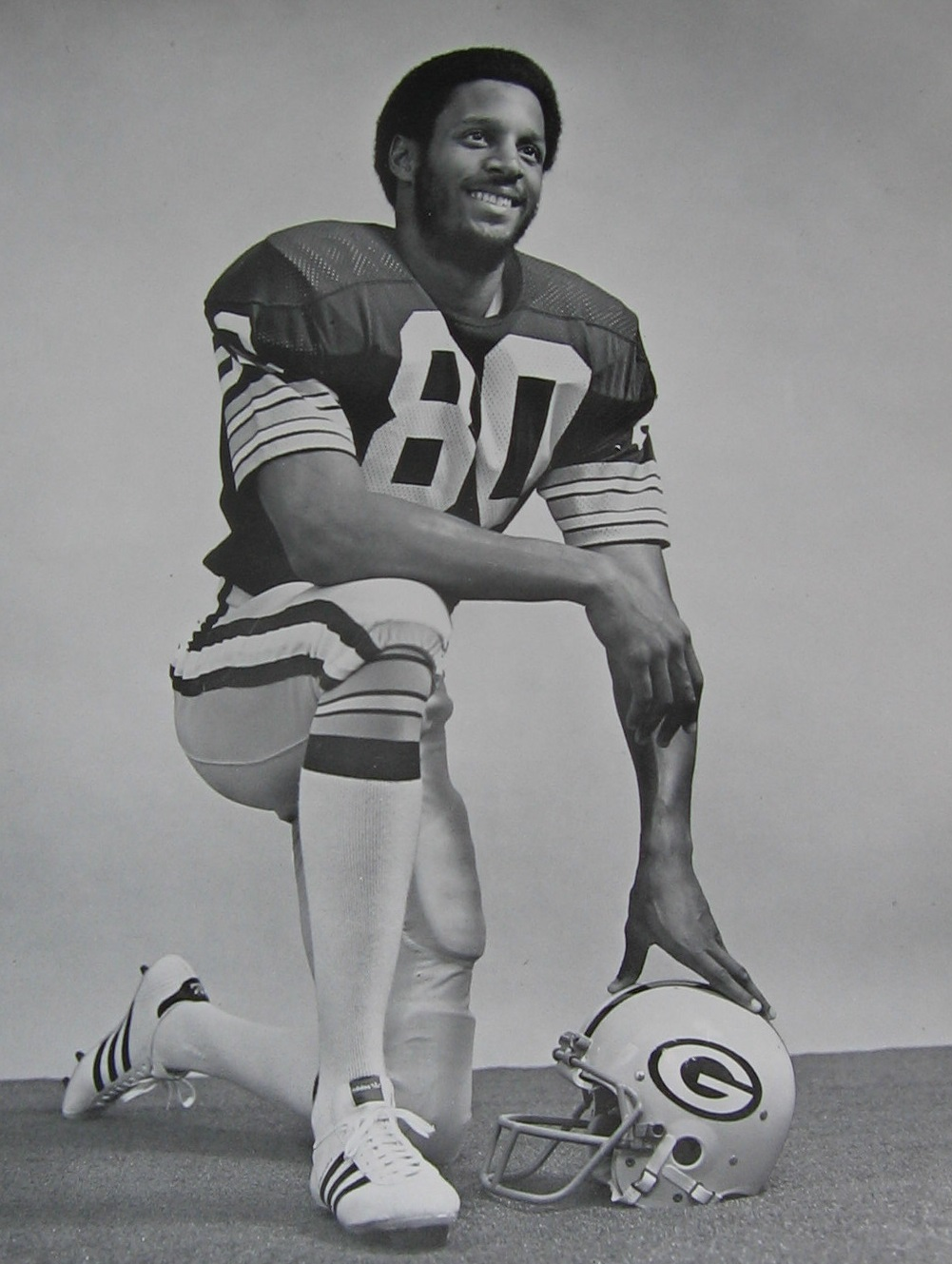
James Lofton

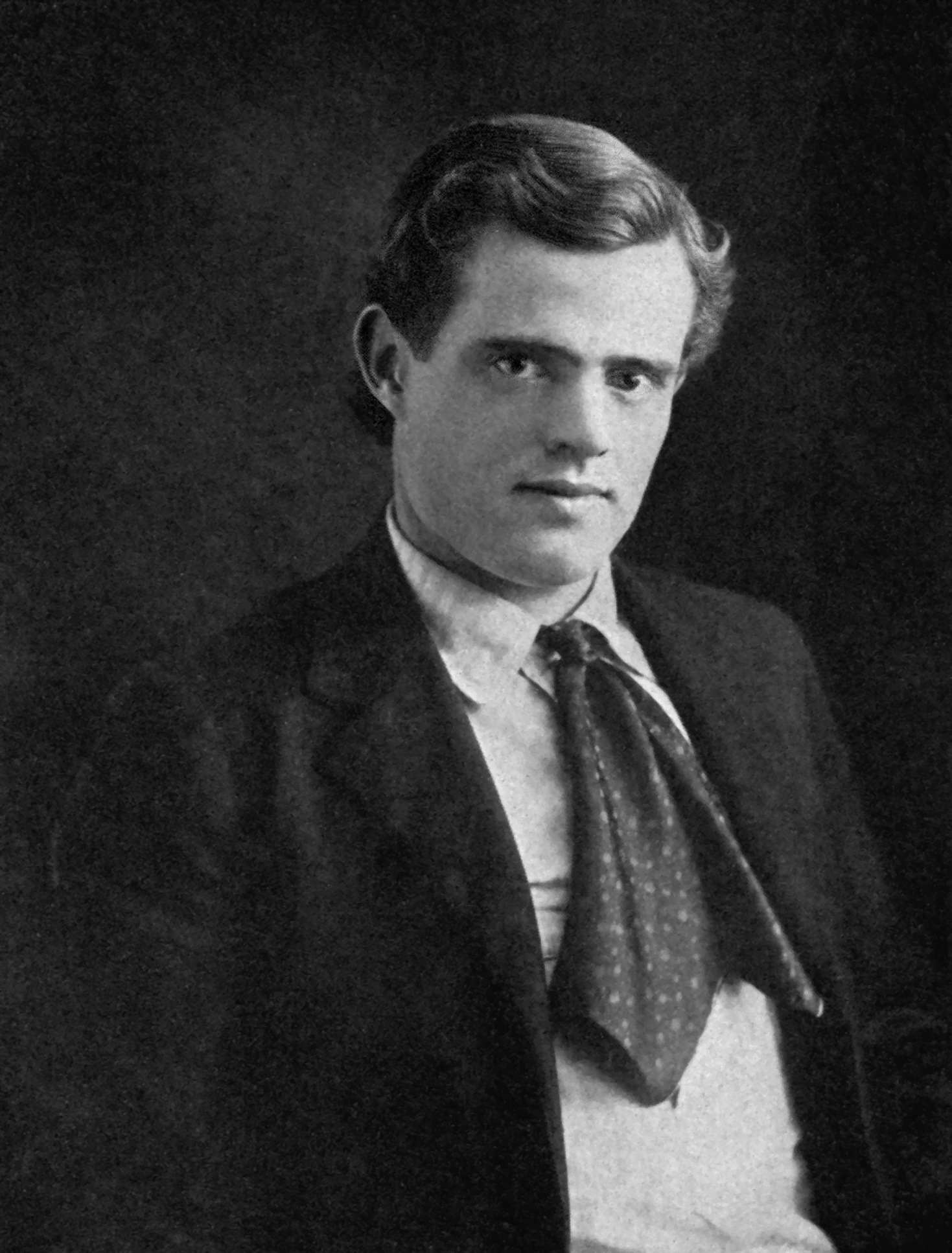
Jack London

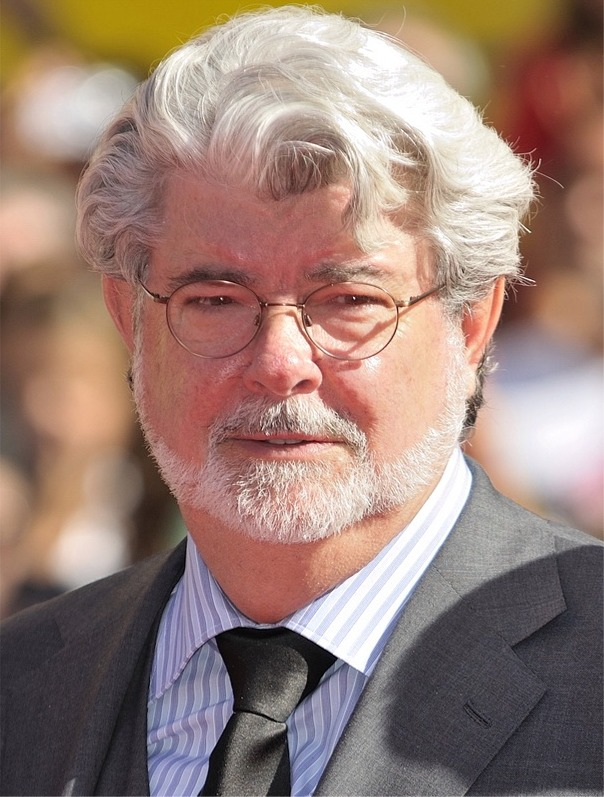
George Lucas

Larry (Ler)Lalonde -- guitarist, musician

- Aimee La Joie – actress (Freedom, Wisconsin)
- Shia LaBeouf – actor
- Remy LaCroix – pornographic actress
- Lalaine – actress and singer-songwriter
- Derek Lam – fashion designer
- Kendrick Lamar – rapper, songwriter, and record producer
- Phil LaMarr – voice artist
- Adam Lambert – singer (American Idol)
- Michelle Lambert – singer
- Matthew Lane – professional golfer
- Ryan Lane – actor
- Brie Larson – actress
- Kyle Larson – racing driver
- Greg Laswell – singer and musician
- Lauv – Singer-songwriter
- Ryan Lavarnway – Israeli-American major-league baseball catcher (Los Angeles Dodgers)
- Rick Law – illustrator and producer
- Ernest Lawrence – nuclear physicist
- Bianca Lawson – actress
- Tony Lazzeri – baseball player
- Brad Leaf – Israeli-American basketball player for Hapoel Galil Elyon and Maccabi Tel Aviv of the Israel Premier League
- T. J. Leaf – Israeli-American NBA basketball player
- Kiana Ledé – singer
- Amy Lee – musician (lead singer of Evanescence)
- Bruce Lee – martial artist
- Jason Lee – actor (My Name Is Earl)
- Swae Lee – rapper
- Tommy Lee – Greek-American musician
- Catherine LeFrançois – IFBB professional bodybuilder
- Karenssa LeGear – actress (Carving a Life)
- Janet Leigh – actress
- Jennifer Jason Leigh – actress (Fast Times at Ridgemont High)
- Thomas W. Lentz – art historian
- Kawhi Leonard – basketball player (Los Angeles Clippers)
- Logan Lerman – actor
- Brad Lesley – baseball player and cast member on Takeshi's Castle
- Lisa Leslie – basketball player
- Camille Levin – soccer player
- Savannah Levin – soccer player
- Adam Levine – musician (lead singer of pop/rock group Maroon 5)
- Alexander Lévy – professional golfer
- Jane Levy – actress
- Monica Lewinsky – White House intern
- Huey Lewis – musician (Huey Lewis and the News)
- Juliette Lewis – actress
- Louise Lieberman (born 1977) – soccer coach and former player
- Rob Liefeld – comic book writer
- Xian Lim – Filipino actor, model, singer, host, blogger, filmmaker and professional basketball player
- Jeremy Lin – basketball player
- Seven Lions – musician
- Jonathan Lipnicki – actor (Stuart Little)
- David Lipsky – golfer
- Scott Lipsky – tennis player
- Peyton List – actress (Bunk'd, Cobra Kai)
- Blake Lively – actress (Gossip Girl)
- Heather Locklear – actress
- James Lofton – NFL wide receiver
- John Logan – film screenwriter
- Alison Lohman – actress
- Konstantin Lokhanov (born 1998) – junior world champion and Olympic saber fencer
- Jack London – author (The Call of the Wild)
- Lauren London – television personality, actress, and model
- Evan Longoria – baseball player
- George Lopez – actor and comedian (George Lopez, Lopez vs. Lopez)
- Mario Lopez – actor (Saved by the Bell)
- Nancy Lopez – golfer
- Erik Lorig – football player (New Orleans Saints)
- Caity Lotz – actress, dancer, and singer
- Greg Louganis – Olympic diver
- Billie Lourd – actress
- Demi Lovato – actress and singer
- Courtney Love – musician
- Darlene Love – singer and actress
- Kevin Love – basketball player (Utah Jazz)
- Mike Love – singer and songwriter
- Jon Lovitz – actor
- Ramona Lubo – Native American basketmaker
- George Lucas – filmmaker (Star Wars)
- Lorna Luft – singer and actress
- Athena Lundberg – Playboy Playmate of the Month (January 2006)
- Ray Lynch – actor
- Ross Lynch – singer (R5) and actor (Austin & Ally)
- Cheryl Lynn – singer

== M ==
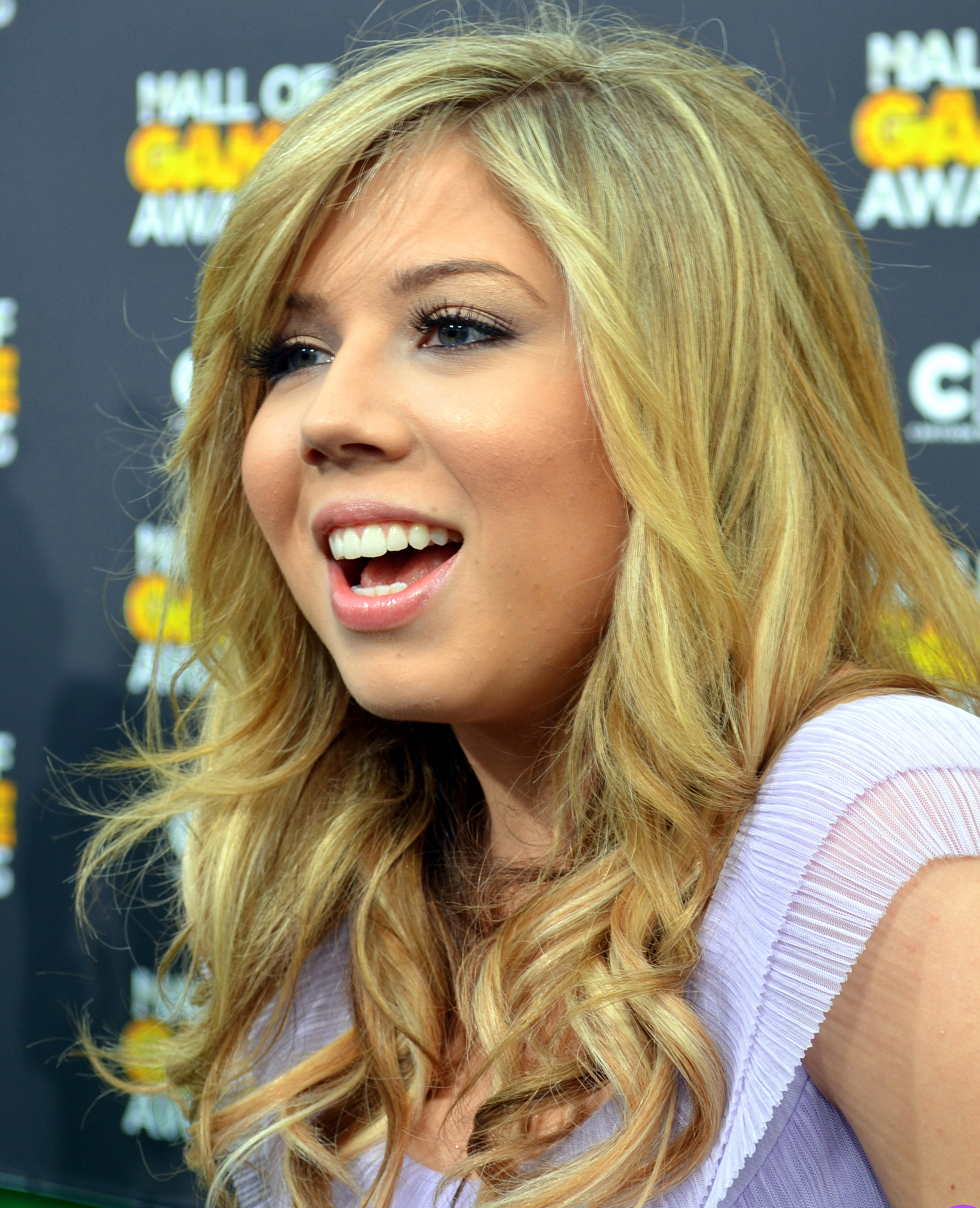
Jennette McCurdy

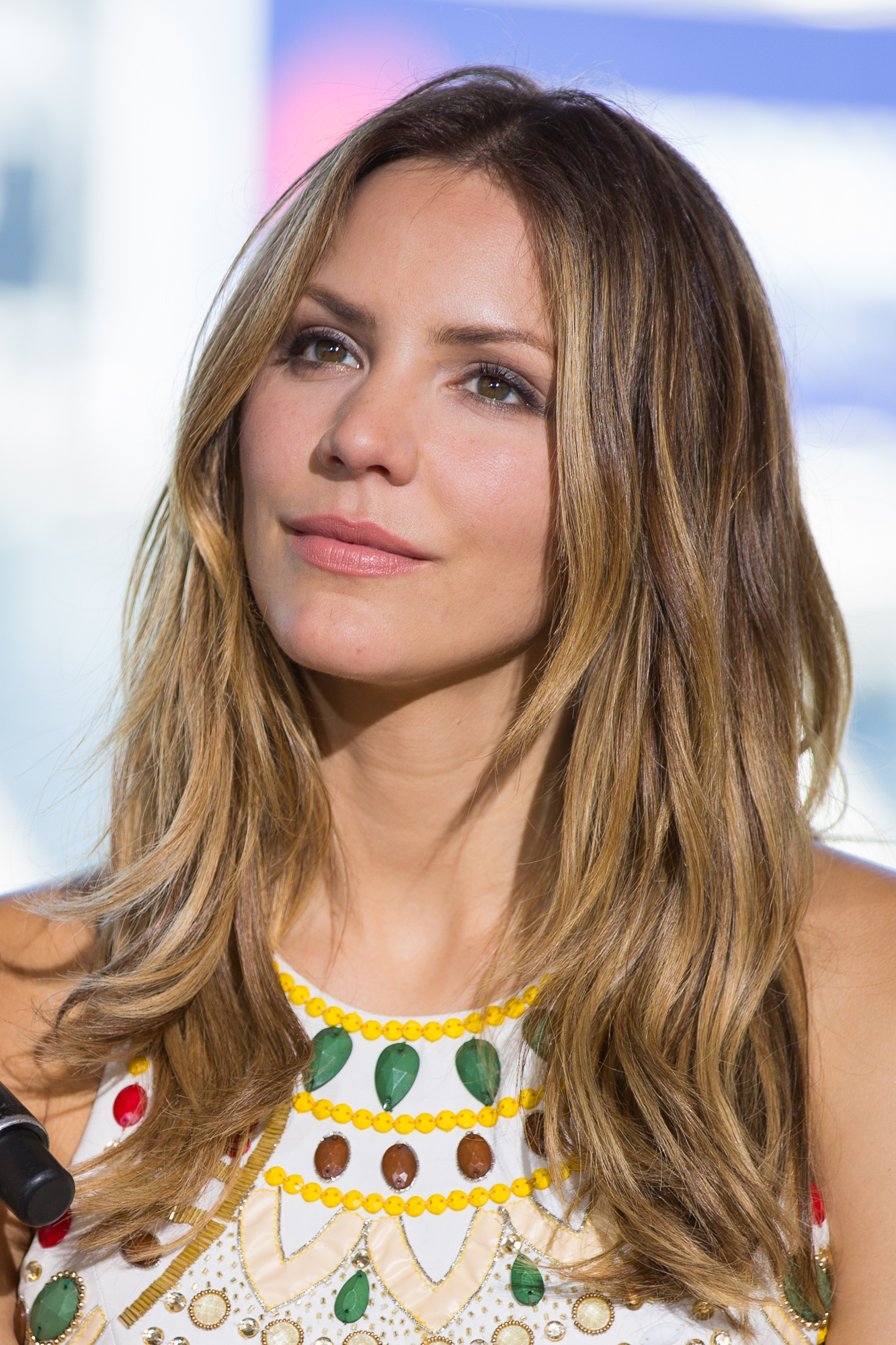
Katharine McPhee

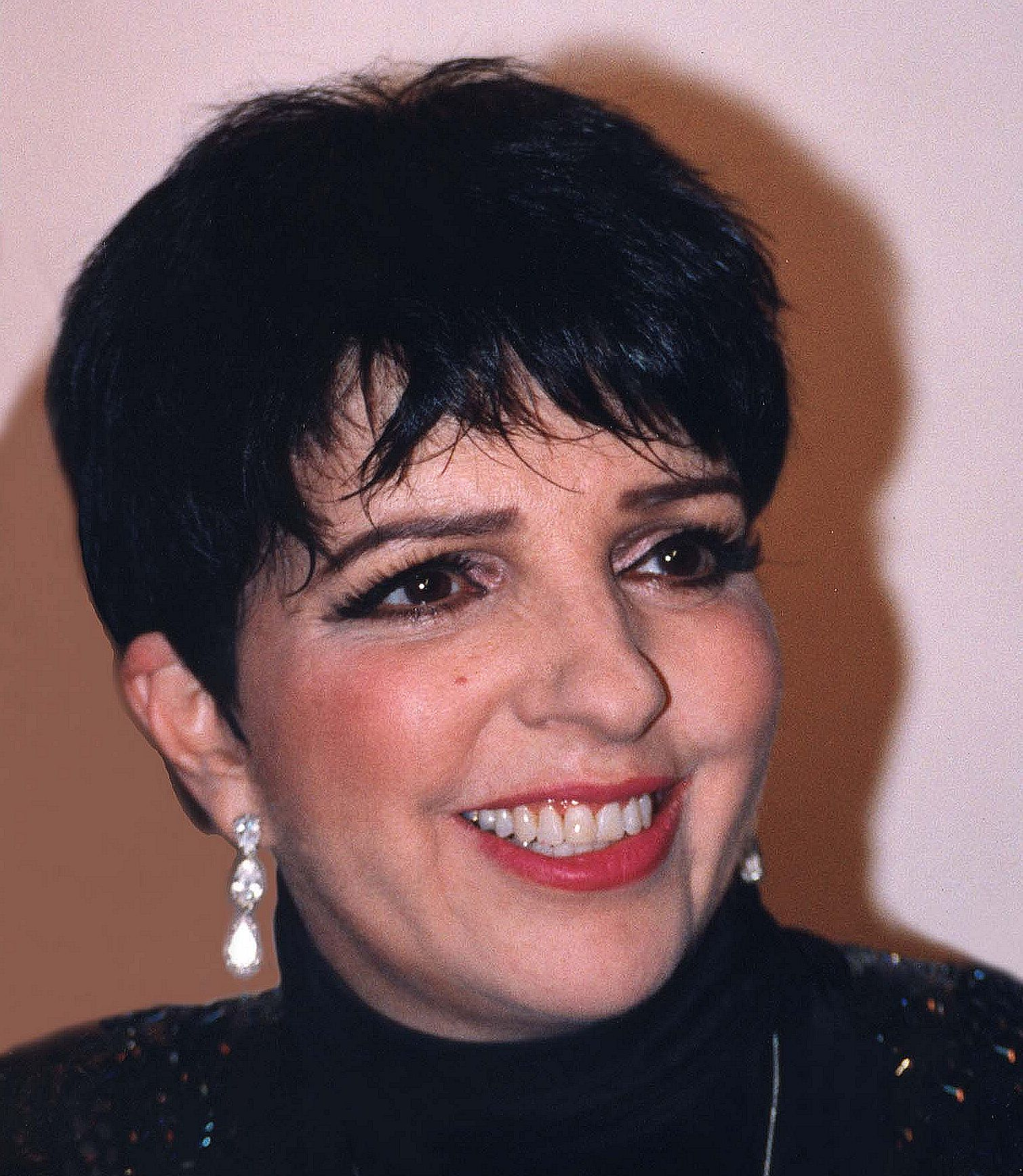
Liza Minnelli

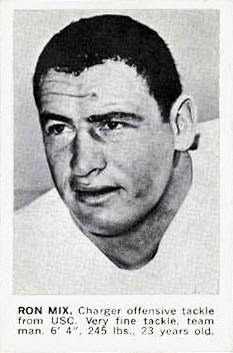
Ron Mix

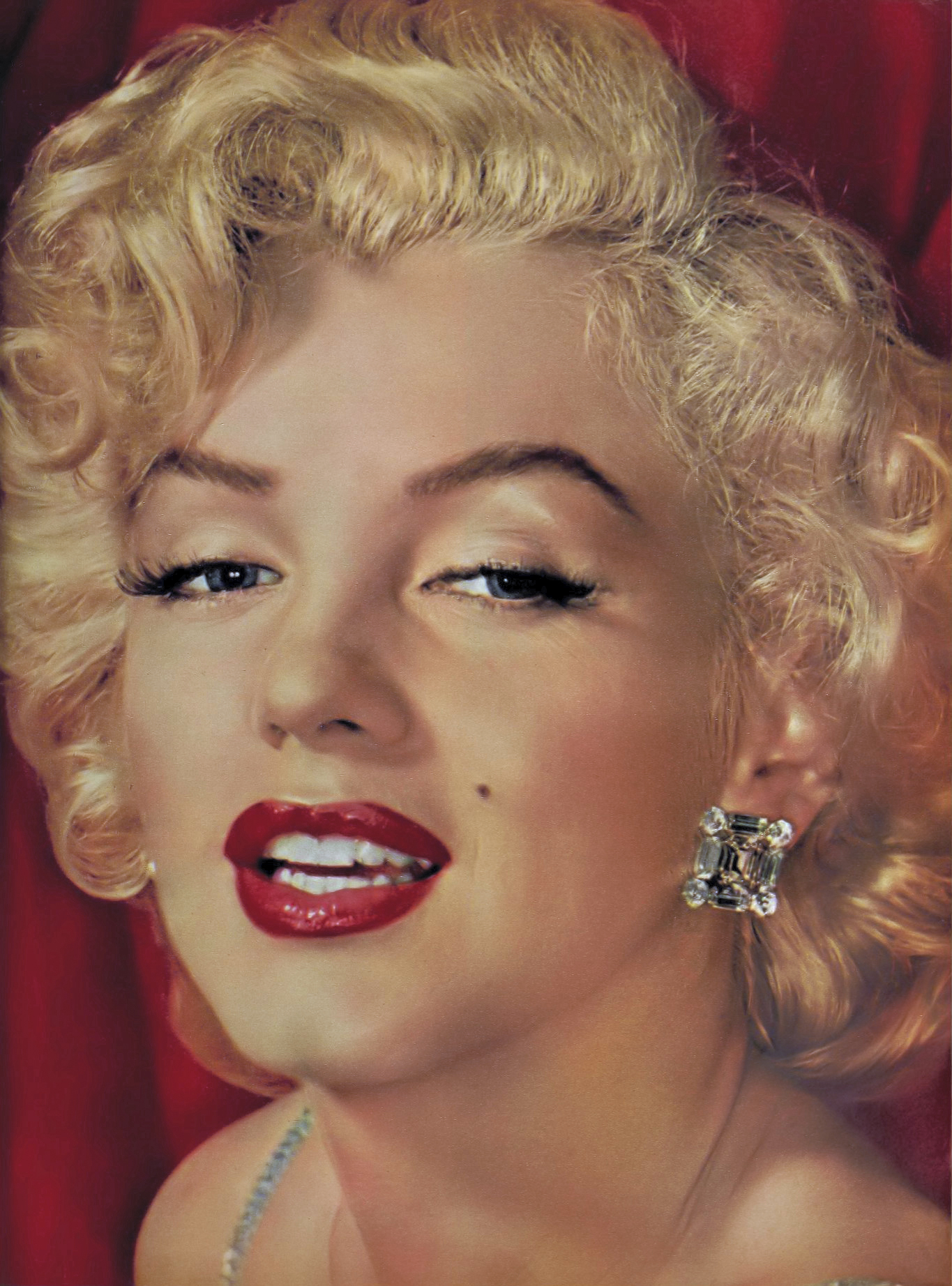
Marilyn Monroe

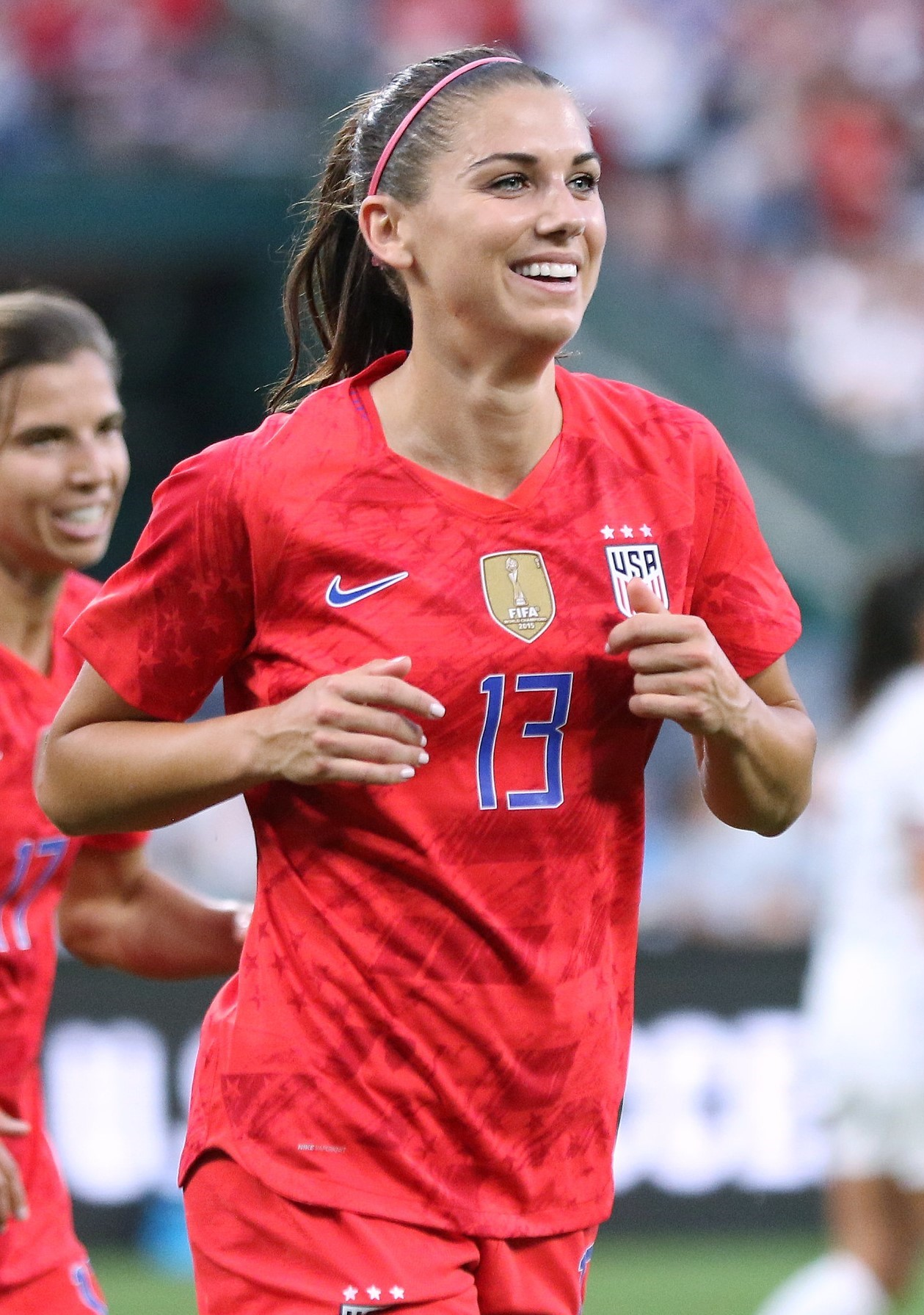
Alex Morgan

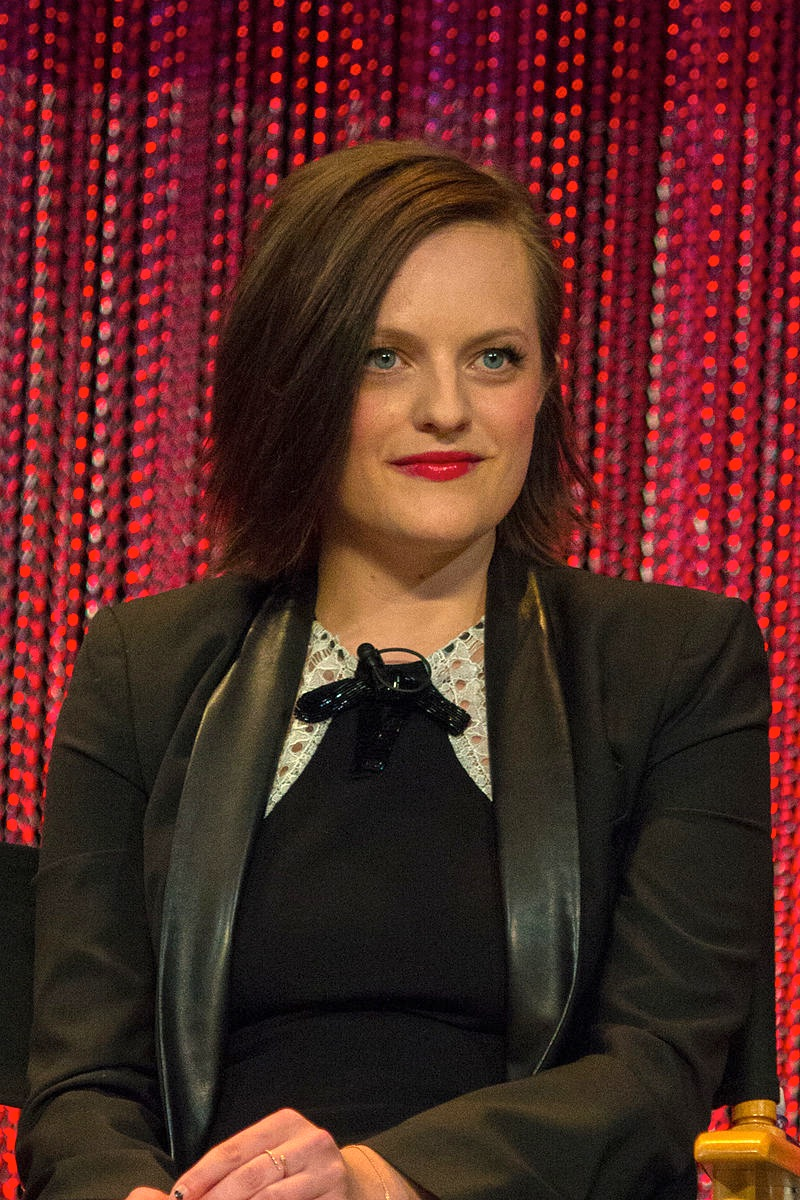
Elisabeth Moss

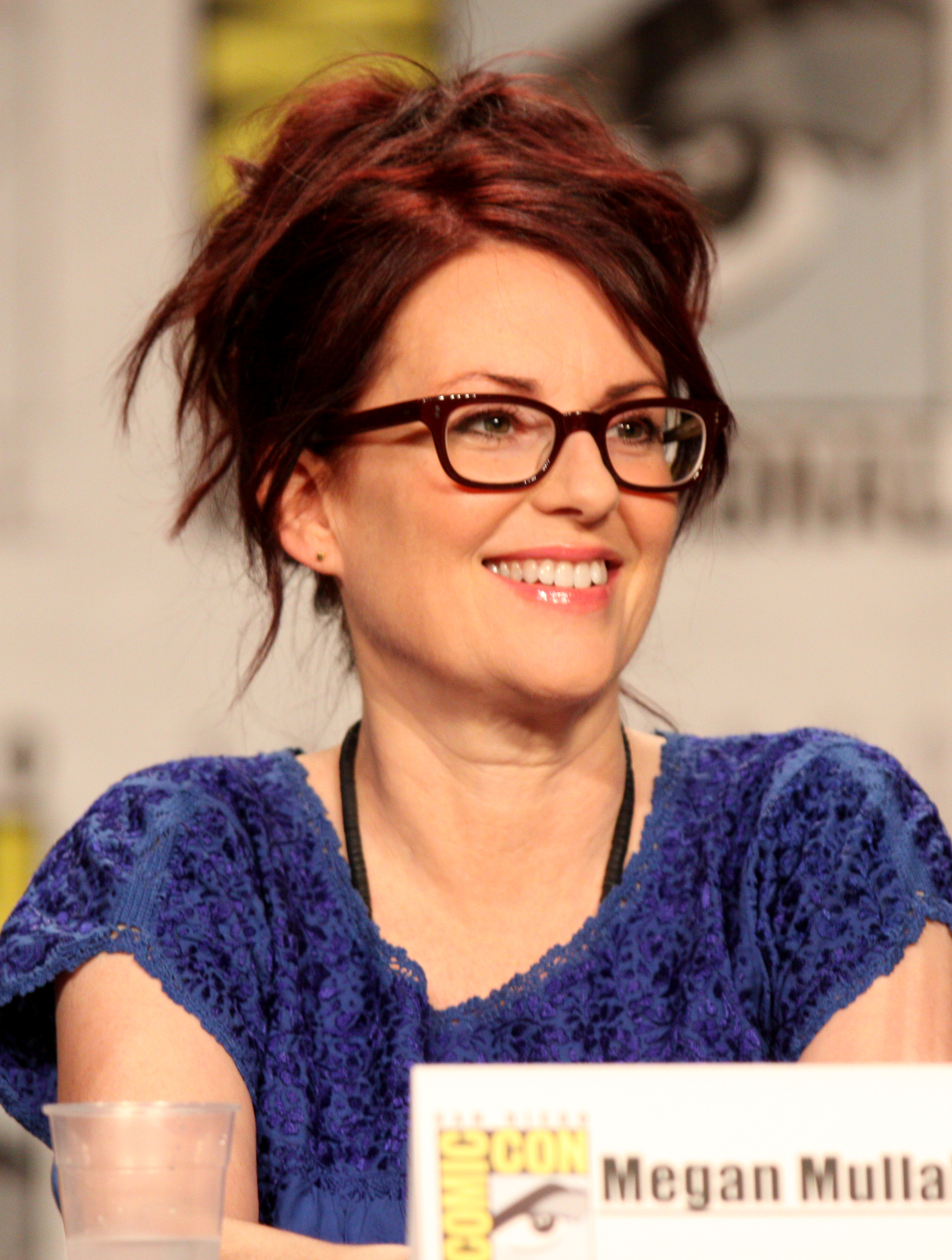
Megan Mullally

- Muriel Irwin MacDonald – journalist, editor, rancher
- Alex Mack – NFL center
- John Madden (1936-2021), NFL coach, player, and sports commentator
- Judah Leon Magnes – rabbi, first president of the Hebrew University of Jerusalem
- Tobey Maguire – actor and producer
- Theodore Maiman – inventor of Ruby Laser Systems Laser
- Daron Malakian – musician, singer-songwriter, and guitarist (System of a Down)
- Rami Malek – actor
- Mia Malkova – pornographic actress
- Nazanin Mandi – actress, model, and singer
- Ricky Manning – football player
- J.P. Manoux – actor
- Bruce Manson (born 1956) – tennis player
- Josie Maran – actress and model
- Laura Marano – actress (Austin & Ally)
- Vanessa Marano – actress (Switched at Birth)
- Vanessa Marcil – actress (Beverly Hills, 90210)
- Stacy Margolin (born 1959) – tennis player
- Xolo Maridueña (born 2001) – actor (Blue Beetle)
- Constance Marie – actress
- Teena Marie – singer
- Cheech Marin – comedian and actor
- Shannon Marketic – Miss USA 1992
- Meghan Markle – actress and member of the British royal family
- Mozhan Marnò – television actress
- McKayla Maroney – 2012 Olympic gold and silver medalist (artistic gymnastics)
- Dean Paul Martin – actor and musician
- Steve Martin – comedian and actor
- Bobby Martinez – professional surfer
- Chris Masters – professional wrestler
- Sam Match (1923–2010) – tennis player
- Tim Matheson – actor
- Bob Mathias – decathlete
- Casey Matthews – NFL football linebacker
- Clay Matthews Jr. – NFL football linebacker
- Clay Matthews III –NFL football linebacker
- Rachel Matthews – actress
- Margie Marvelous – professional bodybuilder
- Kathy May – tennis player
- Misty May-Treanor – volleyball player
- MC Hammer – musician
- Merrick McCartha – television and film actor (All American, Failure!)
- Kevin McCarthy – Speaker of the US House of Representatives (2023)
- Dave McCary – comedian and director
- Leigh McCloskey – actor and artist (Dallas)
- Pete McCloskey – politician
- Willie McCool – astronaut; killed in Space Shuttle Columbia disaster
- Maureen McCormick – actress
- Jennette McCurdy – actress, producer and singer (iCarly)
- Audra McDonald – actress and singer (The Good Fight)
- Willie McGee – MLB baseball player
- Ted McGinley – actor
- Jeremy McGrath – supercross racer
- Seanan McGuire – writer
- Mark McGwire – MLB baseball player
- Wendi McLendon-Covey – actress
- Robert McNamara – former United States Secretary of Defense
- Sean McNamara – filmmaker
- Katharine McPhee – singer and actress
- Casey Mears – NASCAR driver
- Edwin Meese – United States Attorney General (1985–88)
- Meghan, Duchess of Sussex – actress and British royal
- Robert Mellard – soldier
- Rodney Melville – judge
- Bob Melvin – Major League Baseball player and manager
- Bridgit Mendler – actress and singer
- Mike Mentzer – professional bodybuilder and 1979 Mr. Olympia heavyweight champion
- Lee Meriwether – actress and Miss America
- Casey Merrill – NFL running back
- Derek Mears – actor and stuntman
- AJ Michalka – actress and musician
- Aly Michalka – actress and singer
- Phil Mickelson – golfer
- Miguel – singer and producer
- Alyssa Miller – model
- Johnny Miller – golfer and television commentator
- Jon Miller – sportscaster
- Marisa Miller – supermodel
- Penelope Ann Miller – actress
- Reggie Miller – NBA basketball player (Indiana Pacers)
- Stanley Miller – chemist
- Norm Mineta – U.S. Secretary of Commerce and Transportation
- Hasan Minhaj – comedian
- Liza Minnelli – singer and actress (Cabaret)
- Christopher Mintz-Plasse – actor (McLovin in (Superbad)
- Deborah A. Miranda – Native American writer and poet
- Patricia Miranda – Olympic women's freestyle wrestler
- Elizabeth Mitchell – actress
- Shay Mitchell – actress (Pretty Little Liars)
- Ron Mix – Hall of Fame football player
- Joe Mixon – NFL running back
- Isaiah Mobley (born 1999) - basketball player for Hapoel Jerusalem of the Israeli Basketball Premier League and the EuroCup.
- Matthew Modine – actor (Full Metal Jacket)
- Cameron Monaghan – actor and model
- Maika Monroe – actress
- Marilyn Monroe – sex symbol and actress (Some Like It Hot)
- Elizabeth Montgomery – actress (Bewitched)
- Warren Moon – football player
- Kyle Mooney – actor and comedian (Saturday Night Live)
- Shemar Moore – actor
- Terry Moore – actress (Mighty Joe Young)
- Alex Morgan – United States women's national soccer team striker
- Pat Morita – Japanese-American actor and comedian
- John Morrison – professional wrestler
- Camila Morrone – actress and model
- George Moscone – mayor of San Francisco
- Jon Moscot – American-Israeli Major League Baseball player for the Cincinnati Reds
- Merrill Moses – Olympic medalist water polo player
- Shane Mosley – boxer
- Elisabeth Moss – actress
- Bethany Mota – YouTuber
- Jason Mraz – singer and musician
- Manny MUA – makeup artist
- Megan Mullally – actress (Will & Grace)
- Thom Michael Mulligan – actor
- Marcus Mumford – singer and musician (Mumford & Sons)
- Bill Mumy – child actor (Lost in Space)
- Noah Munck – actor (iCarly)
- Eddie Murray – MLB baseball player (Baltimore Orioles)
- Lenda Murray – IFBB professional bodybuilder
- Dave Mustaine – musician (Megadeth)
- Dominik Mysterio – professional wrestler
- Rey Mysterio – professional wrestler

== N ==
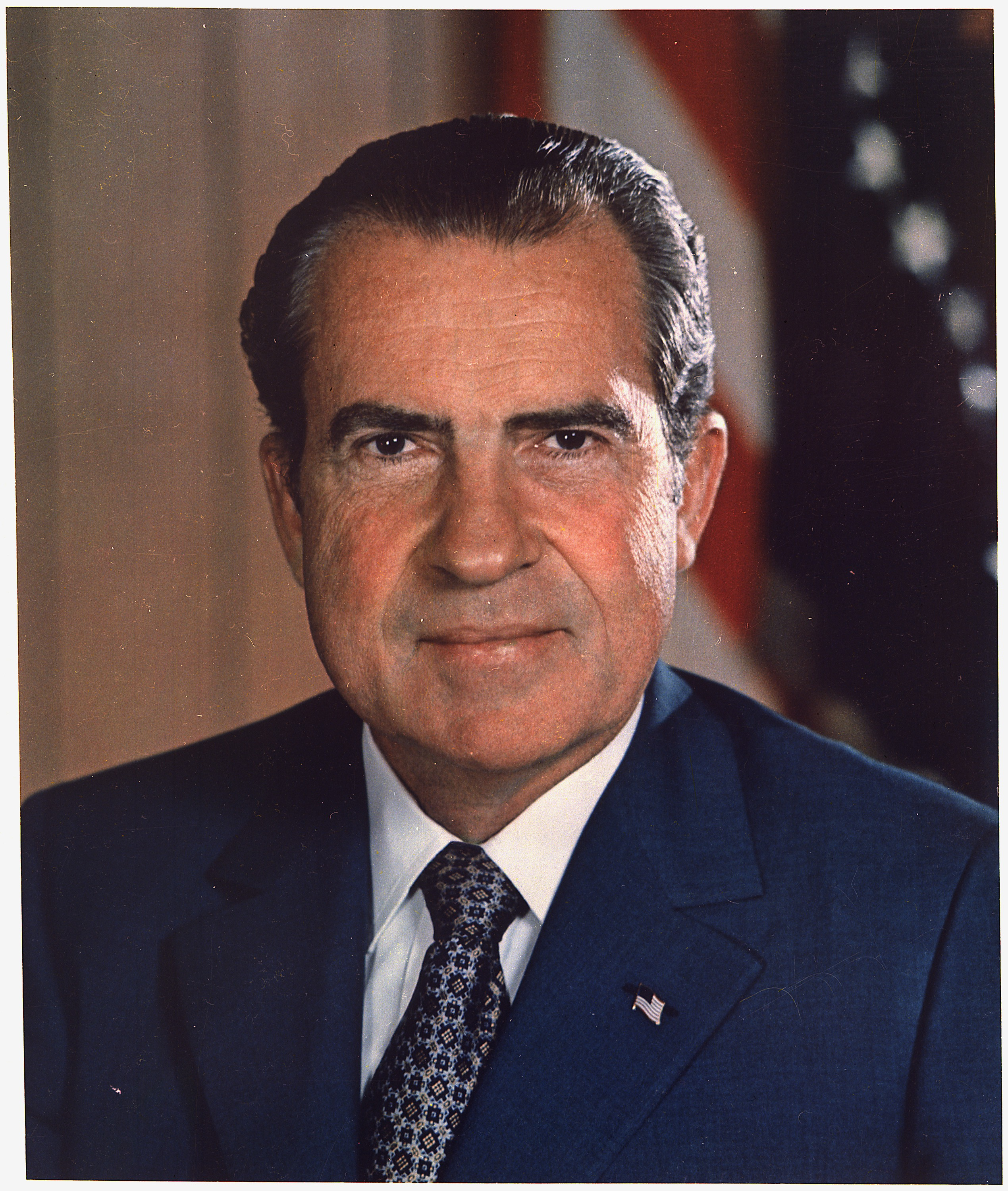
Richard Nixon

- Kent Nagano – conductor
- Mirai Nagasu – figure skater
- Larry Nagler (born 1940) – tennis player
- Sam Nahem (1915–2004) – Major League Baseball pitcher
- Kathy Najimy – actress (King of the Hill)
- Corey Nakatani – horse racing jockey
- Anna Nalick – singer-songwriter
- Hani Naser (1950–2020) – Jordanian-American musician
- Emilio Nava – tennis player
- Dave Navarro – guitarist (Jane’s Addiction)
- Lorenzo Neal – Pro Bowl football player
- Stephen Neal – world champion freestyle wrestler and three-time Super Bowl champion
- Jeff Newman – Major League Baseball All-Star baseball player and manager
- Laraine Newman – comedian, actress, and voice artist
- Randy Newman – composer and musician
- Julie Newmar – actress
- Gavin Newsom – governor of California; former mayor of San Francisco (2004–2011)
- Joanna Newsom – singer and harpist
- Leyna Nguyen – Vietnamese born television anchor
- Nichkhun – Thai-American singer and rapper of 2PM
- Christina Nigra – actress
- Richard Nixon – 37th president of the United States
- Lyn Nofziger – author, journalist, and White House Press Secretary (under Ronald Reagan)
- Isamu Noguchi – artist
- Minae Noji – actress
- Bradley Nowell – singer and musician (Sublime)
- James Nunnally (born 1990) – basketball for Maccabi Tel Aviv of the Israeli Basketball Premier League and the Euroleague, formerly in the NBA

== O ==
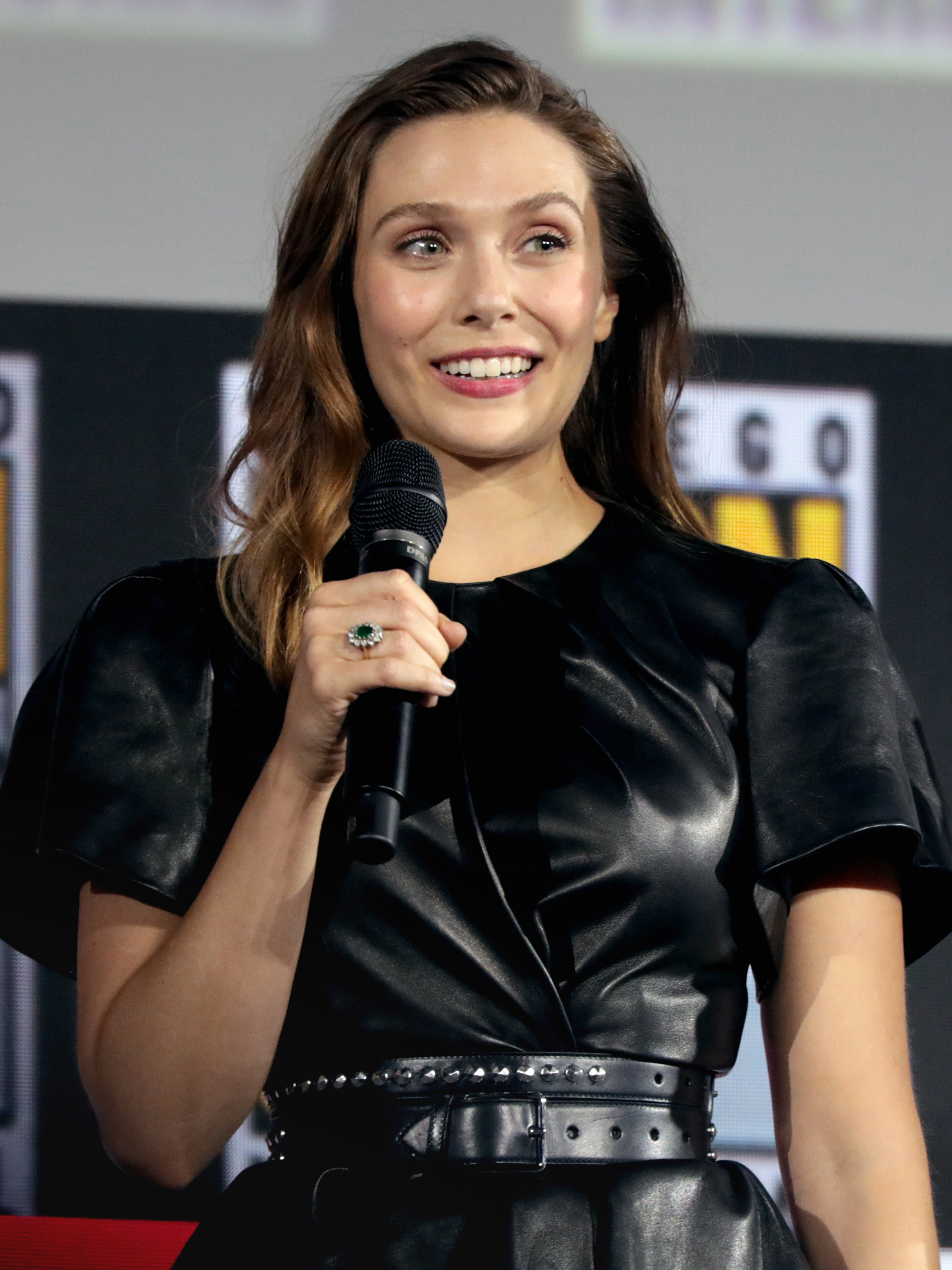
Elizabeth Olsen

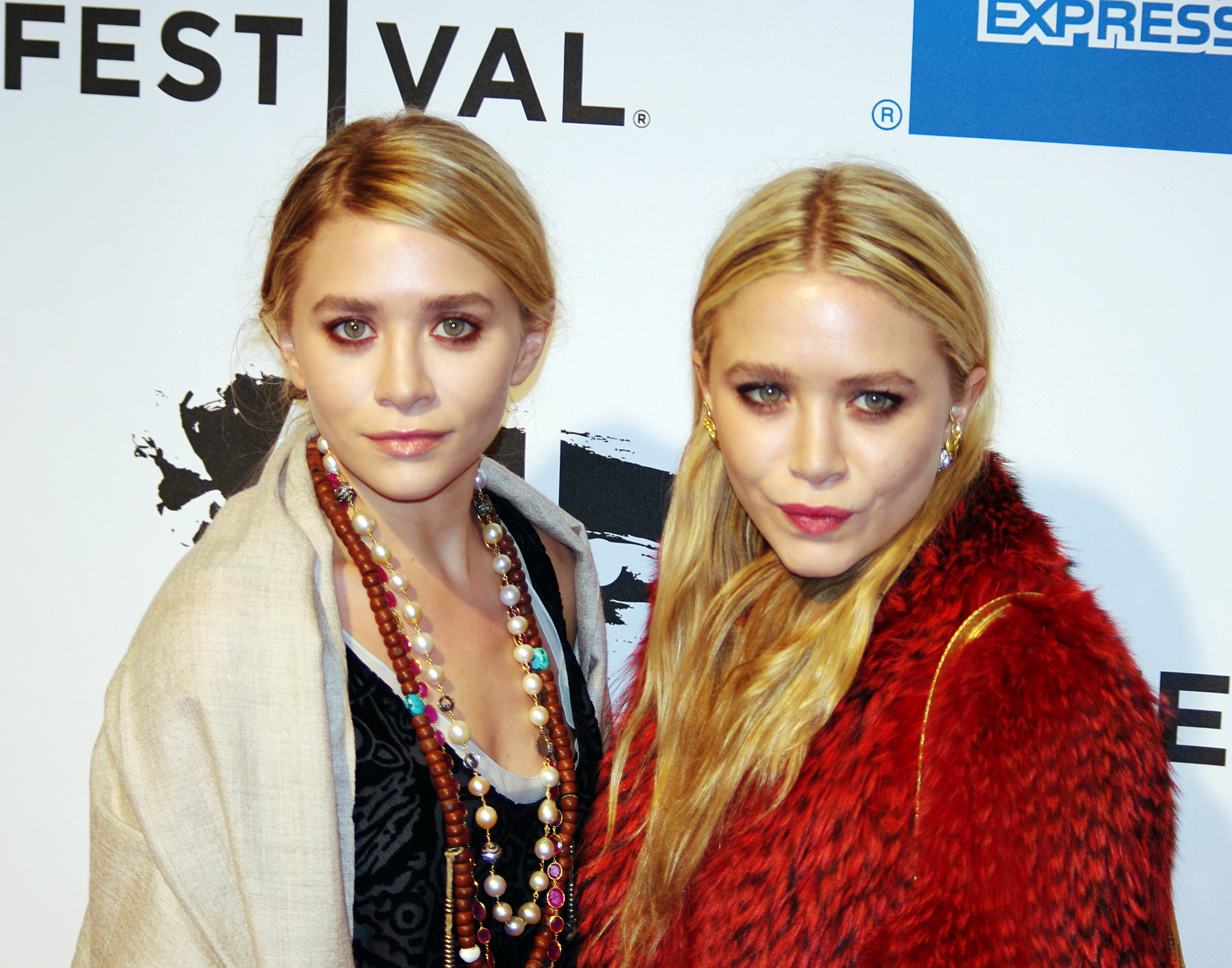
Mary-Kate and Ashley Olsen

- Dagmar Oakland – stage and screen actress
- Willis O'Brien – film special-effects artist
- Frank Ocean – singer (Odd Future)
- Raymond Ochoa – actor
- Ryan Ochoa – actor (ICarly, The Samuel Project)
- Aubrey O'Day – singer (Danity Kane)
- Lefty O'Doul – baseball player
- OhGeesy – rapper
- Larisa Oleynik – actress
- Edward James Olmos – actor
- Tony Olmos – filmmaker (Hemet, or the Landlady Don't Drink Tea)
- Elizabeth Olsen – actress
- Mary-Kate and Ashley Olsen – actresses and entrepreneurs
- Susan Olsen – actress
- Igor Olshansky – National Football League defensive end
- Omarion – musician and singer
- Patrick O'Neal – sportscaster
- Ryan O'Neal – actor
- Tatum O'Neal – actress
- Heather O'Rourke – actress
- Jenna Ortega – actress
- Emily Osment – actress and singer
- Haley Joel Osment – actor
- Jimmy Osmond − singer
- Ryann O'Toole – professional golfer
- Rick Owens – fashion designer

== P ==
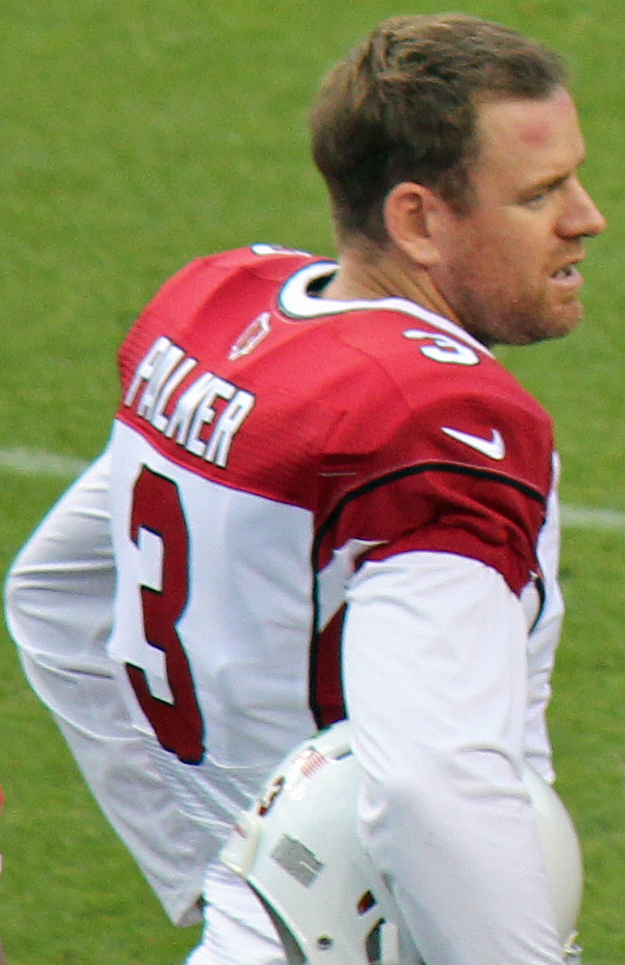
Carson Palmer

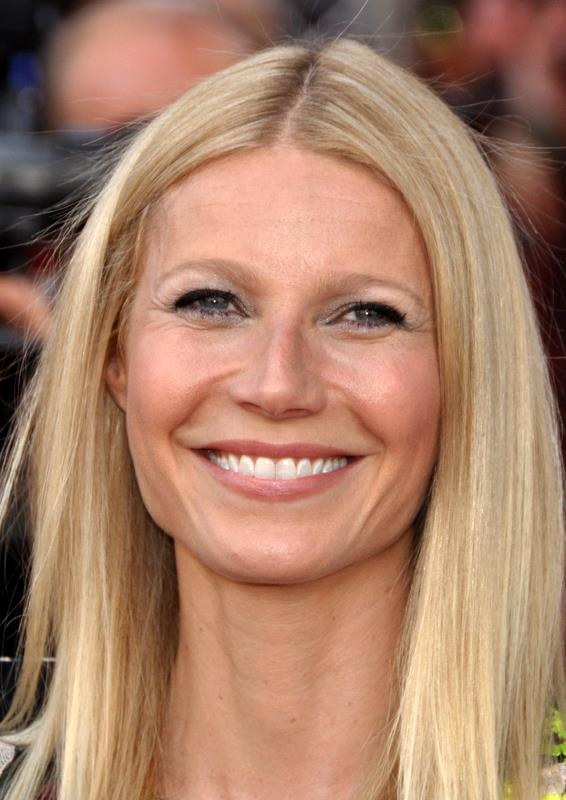
Gwyneth Paltrow

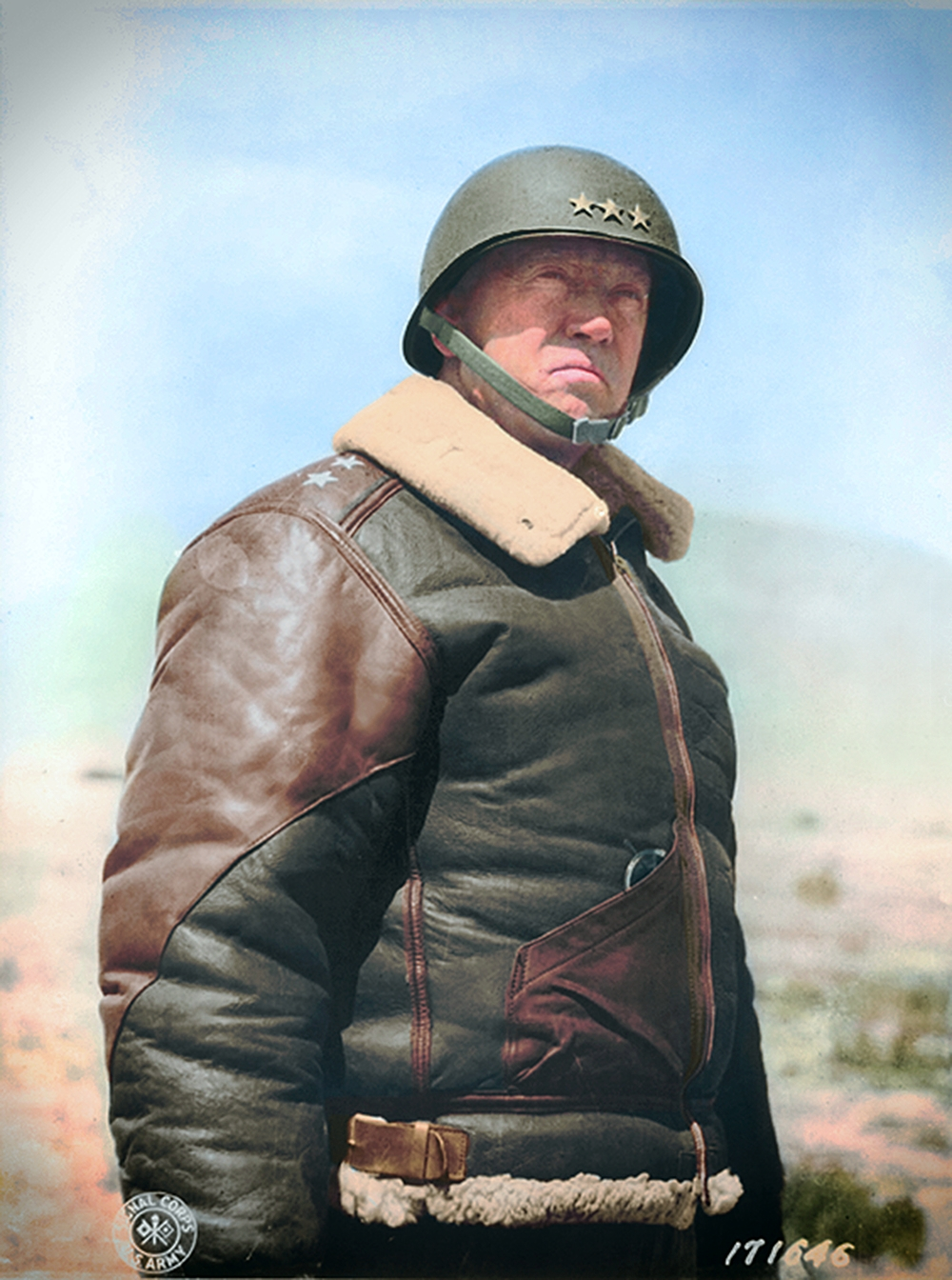
George S. Patton

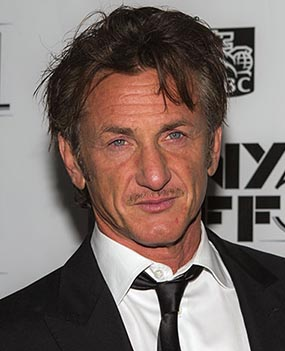
Sean Penn

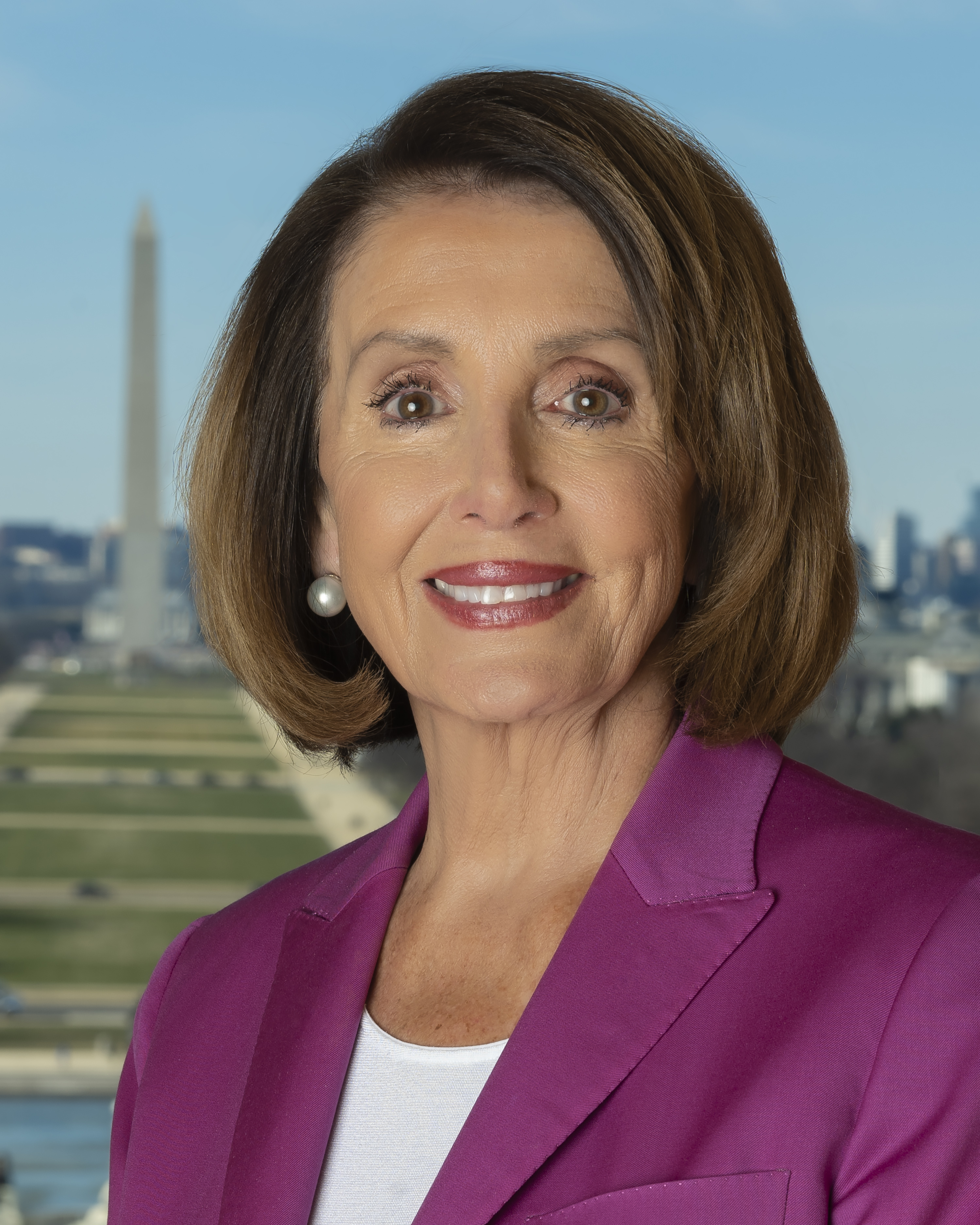
Nancy Pelosi

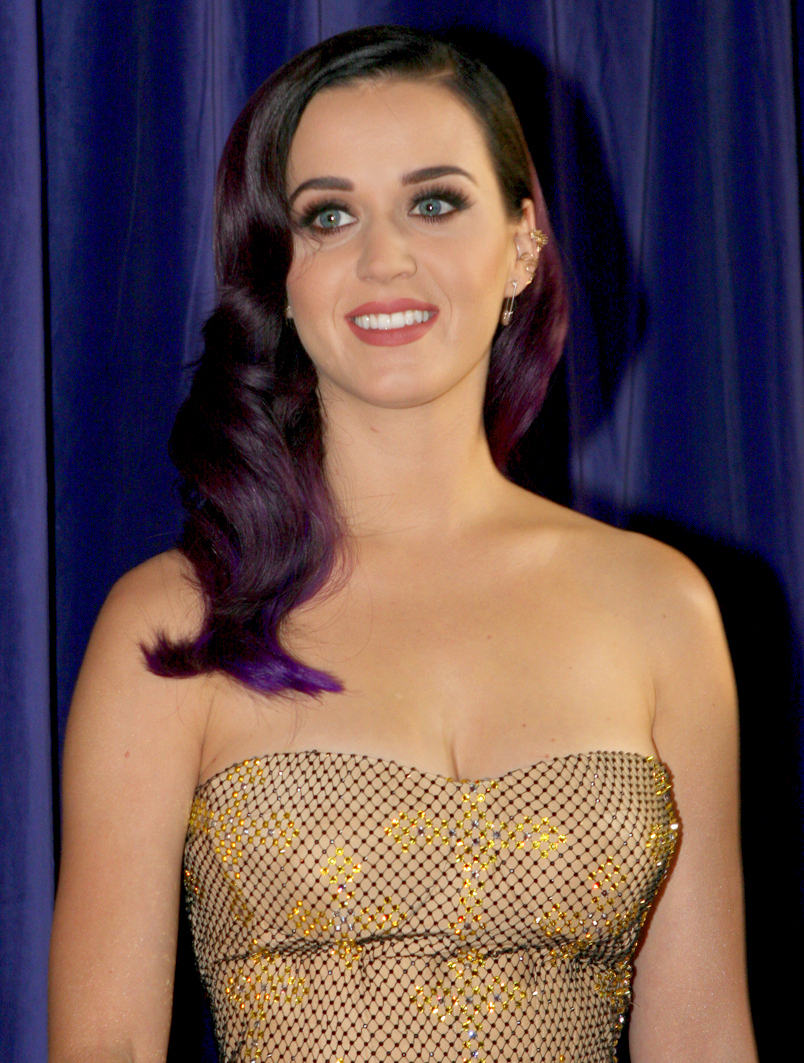
Katy Perry

- Carson Palmer – football quarterback
- Gwyneth Paltrow – actress
- Cathey Palyo – IFBB professional bodybuilder
- Leon Panetta – White House Chief of Staff and Secretary of Defense
- Jon Pardi – singer and musician
- Jennifer Paredes – actress and musician (South of 8)
- Jerry Paris – director and actor (The Dick Van Dyke Show)
- Ashley Park – actress
- Grace Park – actress (Battlestar Galactica, Hawaii Five-0)
- Jae Park – Argentine born K-pop singer
- Richard Park – ice hockey forward for the New York Islanders
- Dominique Parrish – world champion in women's freestyle wrestling
- Harry Partch – composer
- Audrina Patridge – television personality, television presenter, actress, and model
- Dylan Patton – actor
- George S. Patton – military commander
- Paula Patton – actress
- Jake Paul – YouTuber
- Logan Paul – YouTuber
- Corey Pavin – golfer
- Sara Paxton – actress and singer
- Gary Payton – professional basketball player (Seattle SuperSonics)
- Gregory Peck – actor
- Sam Peckinpah – film director
- Joc Pederson – baseball player for the San Francisco Giants
- Dustin Pedroia – baseball player
- Nia Peeples – singer and actress
- Terren Peizer – businessperson convicted of insider trading and securities fraud
- Lisa Pelikan – actress
- Nancy Pelosi – California congresswoman and first Californian and first female speaker of the United States House of Representatives, serving 2007–2011 and 2019–2023
- Chris Penn – actor
- Sean Penn – actor
- Stacy Peralta – skateboarder, surfer, and movie director
- Chelsea Peretti – comedian (Brooklyn Nine-Nine)
- Melina Perez – professional wrestler
- Bradley Steven Perry – actor
- Katy Perry – singer
- Bryan Petersen – baseball player
- Lakey Peterson – professional surfer
- Jade Pettyjohn – actress
- Michelle Pfeiffer – actress
- Paul Pierce – professional basketball player
- Eric Pierpoint – actor
- Kevin Pillar – baseball player
- Chris Pine – actor
- Drew Pinsky – radio and television personality, physician, and addiction medicine specialist
- Kelsey Plum – basketball player (Los Angeles Sparks)
- Eve Plumb – actress
- Jim Plunkett – football quarterback (Oakland Raiders)
- Brennan Poole – NASCAR driver
- Larry Poole – actor and film producer (The Final Wish)
- Whitney Port – television personality, fashion designer, and author
- Tyler Posey – actor (Teen Wolf)
- Stefanie Powers – actress
- Spencer Pratt – television personality
- Tristan Prettyman – singer and musician
- Tayshaun Prince – professional basketball player (Detroit Pistons)
- Freddie Prinze Jr. – actor
- Kelly Pryce – stand-up comedian
- Jade Puget – musician (AFI)

== Q ==
- Jack Quaid – actor
- Kathleen Quinlan – actress
- J. G. Quintel – animator and voice actor (Regular Show)

== R ==
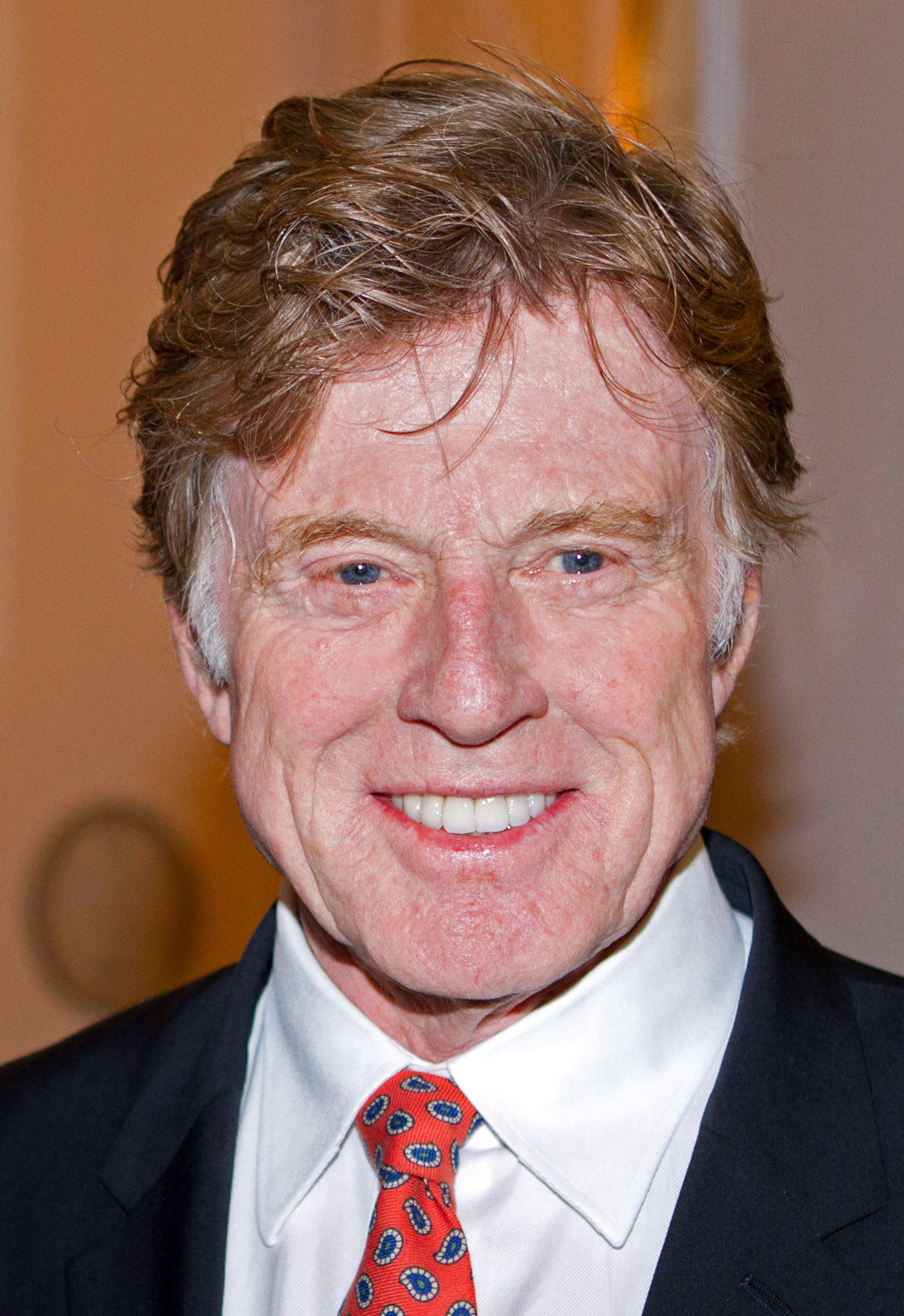
Robert Redford

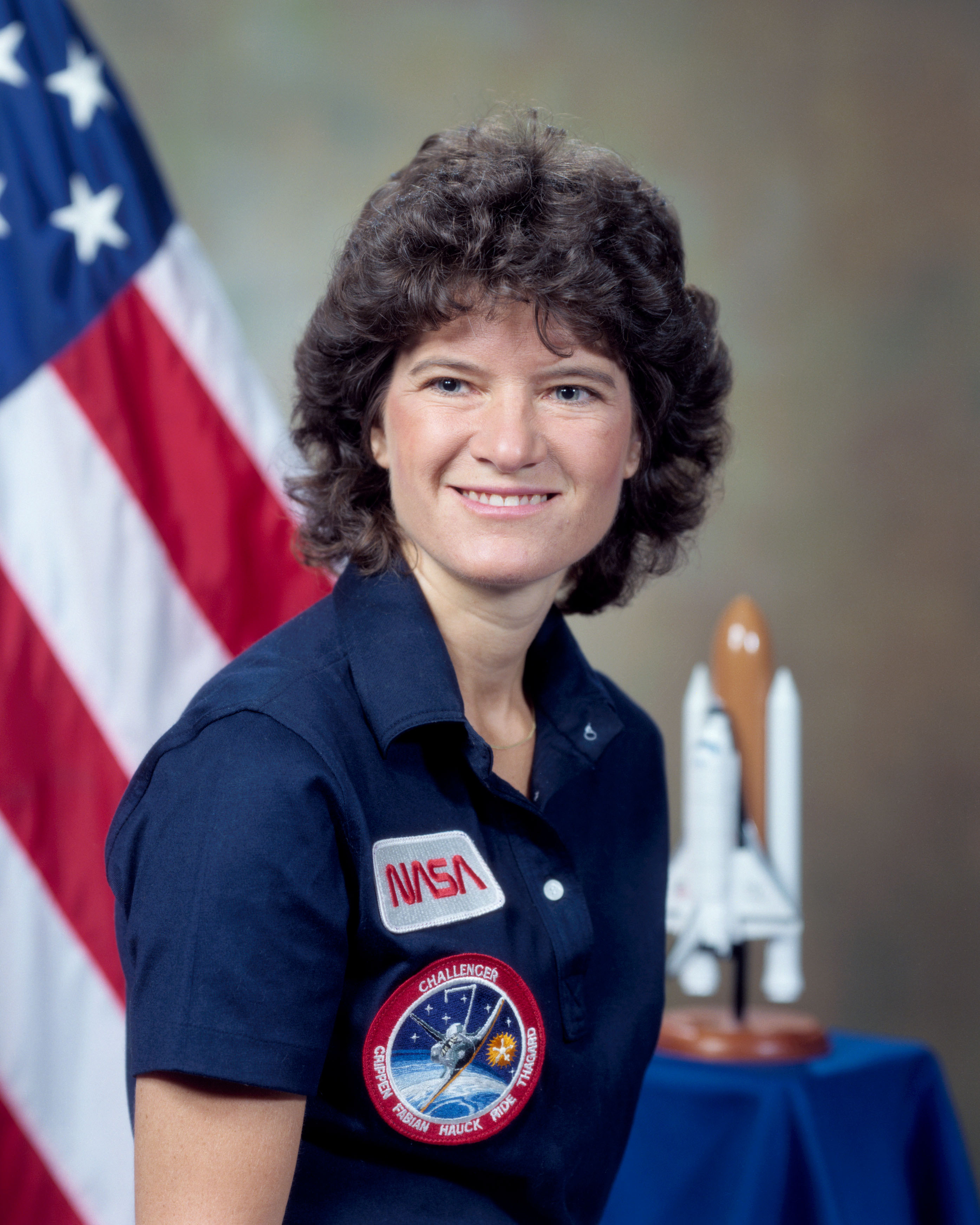
Sally Ride

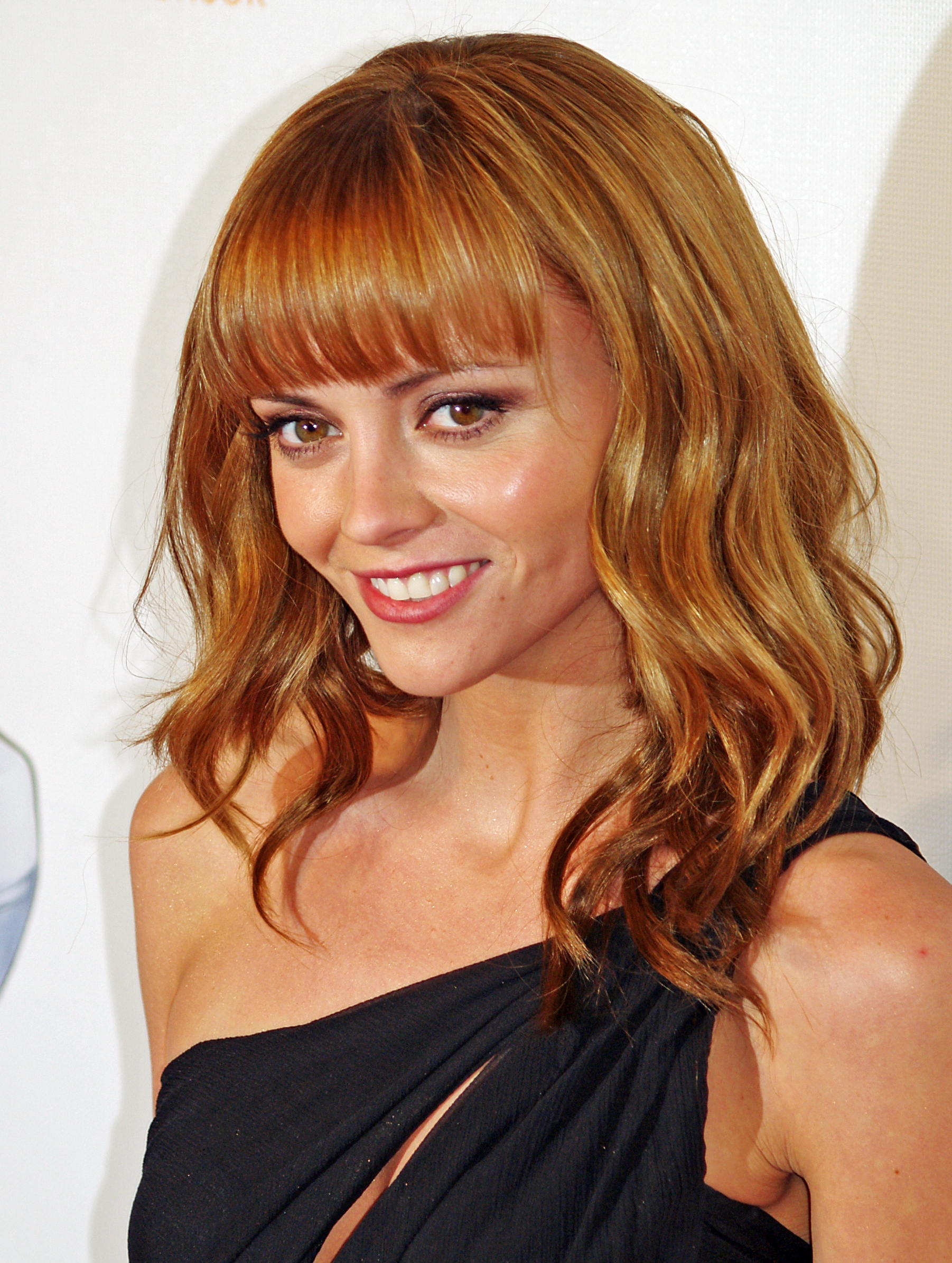
Christina Ricci

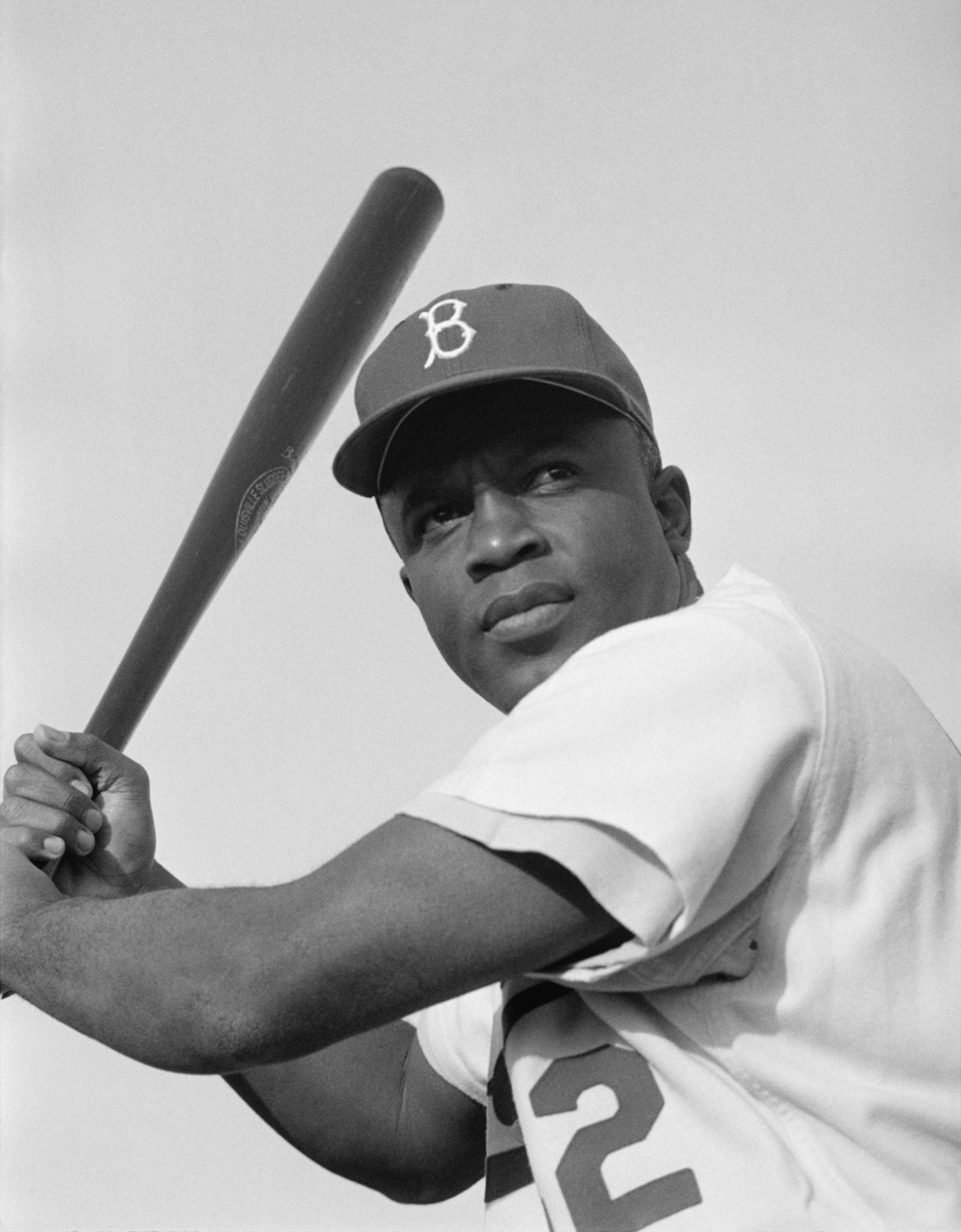
Jackie Robinson

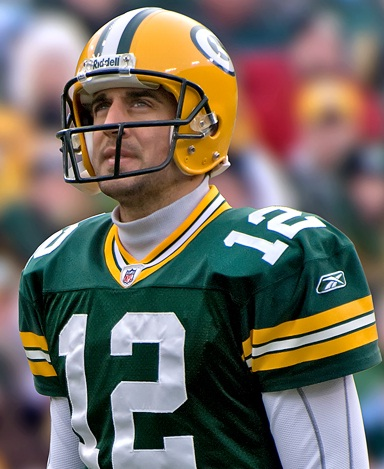
Aaron Rodgers

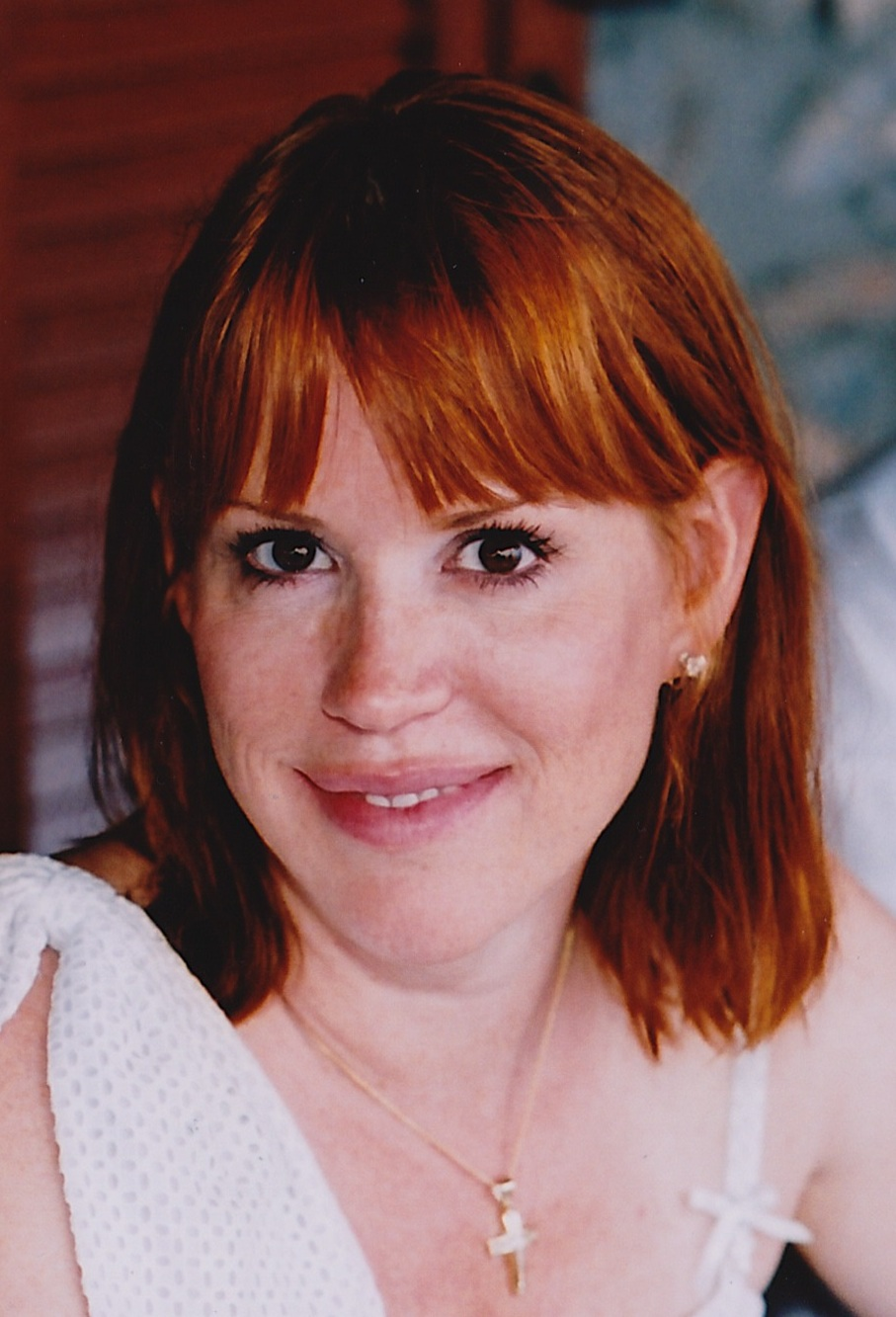
Molly Ringwald

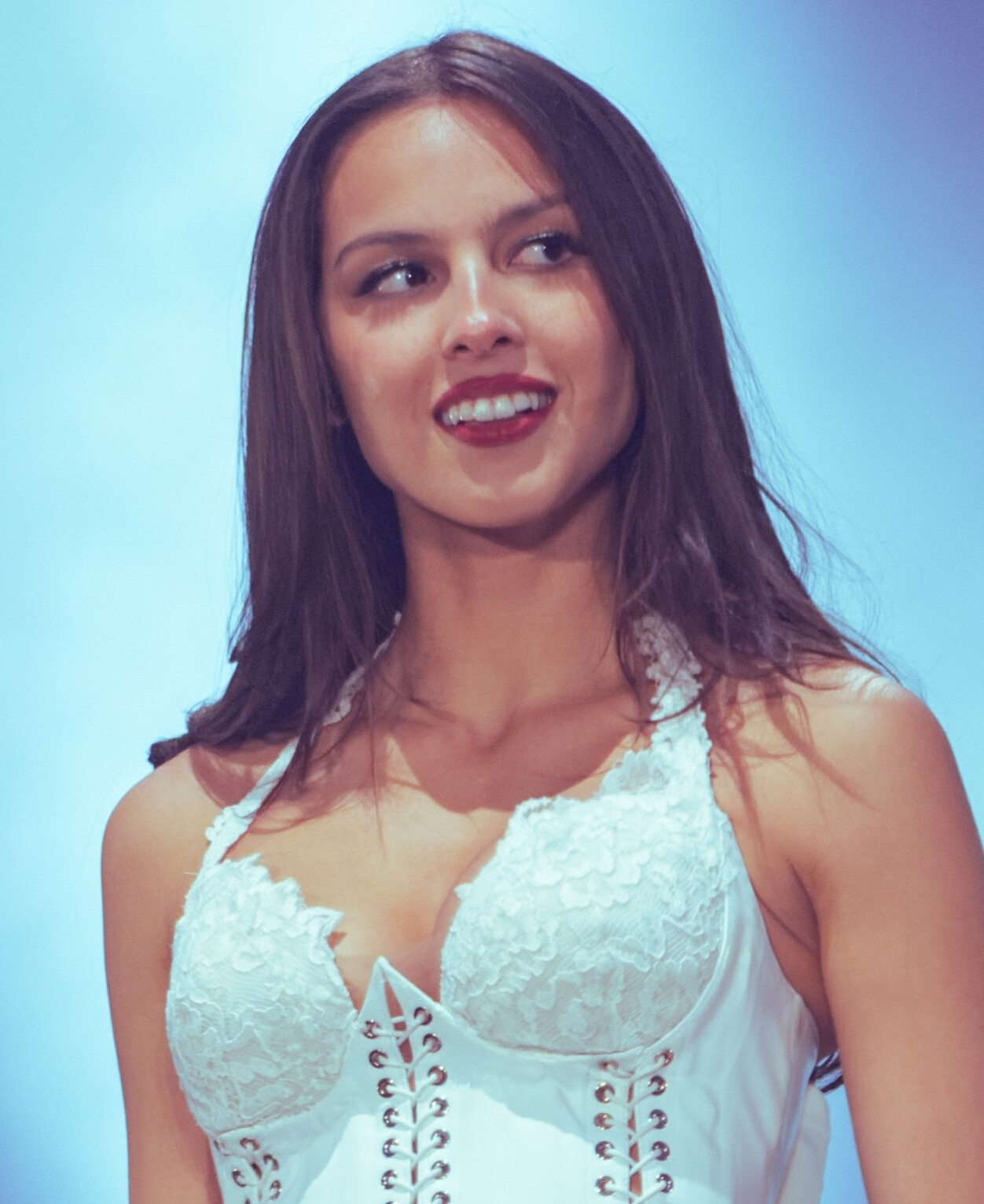
Olivia Rodrigo

- Shelby Rabara ( born 1983) – actress
- Scott Radinsky – Major League Baseball player and coach
- Frances Rafferty – actress
- Max Rafferty – former California State Superintendent of Public Instruction, author, and columnist
- Mark Ragins – psychiatrist in the recovery movement, founding member of the Village ISA
- Francia Raisa – actress
- Bonnie Raitt (born1949) – singer
- Lara Raj – singer from the group KATSEYE
- Efren Ramirez – actor
- Megan Rapinoe – professional soccer player, Olympic gold medalist
- Ben Rattray – founder and CEO of Change.org
- Ronald Reagan – governor of California (1967–1975), former actor, and 40th president of the United States
- Tyler Reddick – NASCAR driver
- Robert Redford – actor and director
- Nikki Reed – actress
- Mason Reese – child actor
- Autumn Reeser – actress (The O.C.)
- Andy Reid – football coach
- Tasha Reign – pornographic actress, nude model, producer, and sex columnist
- Maria Remenyi – Miss USA 1966
- Jeremy Renner – actor (The Avengers, Mayor of Kingstown, Mission Impossible, S.W.A.T.)
- Dane Reynolds – professional surfer (Quiksilver)
- Ryan Reynolds – award-winning actor born in Canada lives in California
- Roddy Ricch – rapper
- Christina Ricci – actress (The Addams Family)
- Neil Raymond Ricco – poet and author
- Robert Ri'chard – actor
- Ariana Richards – actress (Jurassic Park)
- Kyle Richards – actress and television personality
- Michael Richards – actor (Seinfeld)
- Nicole Richie – actress (The Simple Life)
- Sofia Richie – model
- Sally Ride – astronaut (STS-7 and STS-41-G)
- Isiah Rider – basketball player
- Cathy Rigby – gymnast and actress (Peter Pan)
- Molly Ringwald – actress
- Jason Ritter – actor (son of John Ritter; grandson of Tex Ritter)
- Jenni Rivera – singer
- Naya Rivera – actress and singer (Glee)
- Ron Rivera – American football player and coach
- Lil Rob – Chicano rapper
- Tim Robbins – actor
- Tony Robbins – life coach
- Jackie Robinson (1919–1972) – Baseball Hall of Famer who broke Major League Baseball's 20th-century color line
- Julia Robinson – mathematician
- Lela Rochon – actress
- Sam Rockwell – actor
- Aaron Rodgers – National Football League quarterback
- Olivia Rodrigo – singer and actress
- Paul Rodriguez – Mexican-born comedian, actor, singer and rapper
- Destiny Rogers – singer
- Dana Rohrabacher – member of the United States House of Representatives
- Jimmy Rollins – baseball player
- Jim Rome – sports radio host
- Rebecca Romijn – model and actress
- Tony Romo – football quarterback and commentator
- Al Rosen – Major League Baseball MVP; four-time All-Star
- Daniel Rosenbaum (born 1997) – American-Israeli basketball player in the Israel Basketball Premier League
- Dennis Ross (born 1948), American diplomat and author
- Kyla Ross – 2012 Olympic gold medalist (artistic gymnastics)
- Kerry Rossall – actor and stuntman (Apocalypse Now, Justified)
- Alexander Rossi – racing driver
- Ronda Rousey – professional wrestler, former mixed martial artist, former UFC bantamweight champion
- Rachel Roy – fashion designer
- Josiah Royce – philosopher
- Pete Rozelle – National Football League commissioner
- FaZe Rug – YouTuber
- RuPaul – drag queen
- Bill Russell – basketball player
- Keri Russell – actress
- Rene Russo – actress
- Jesse Rutherford – musician
- Marla Ruzicka – activist (Green Party)
- Drakeo the Ruler – rapper (1993–2021)

== S ==
=== Sa–Sm ===
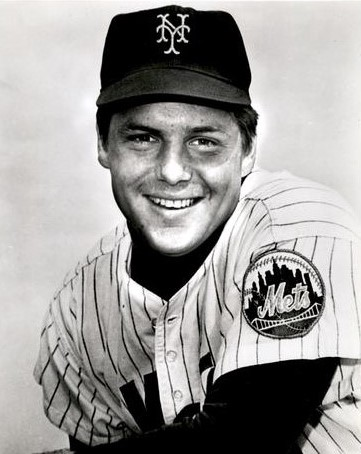
Tom Seaver

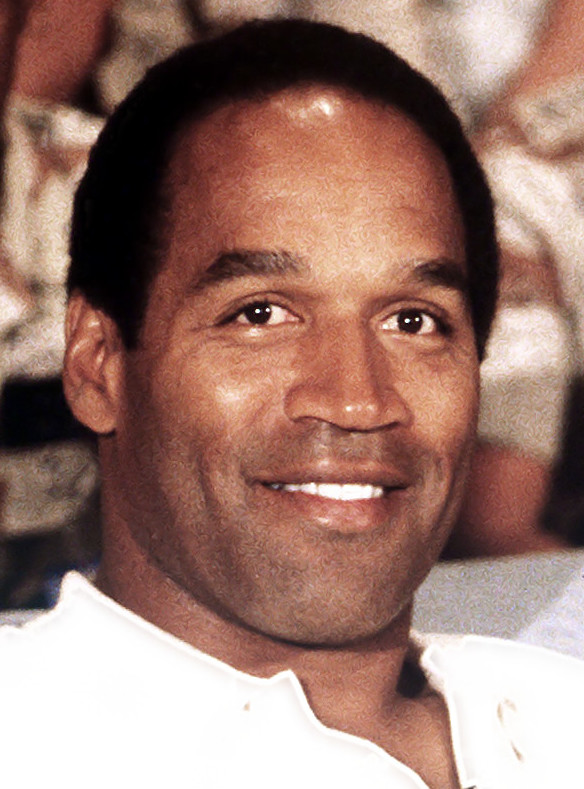
O. J. Simpson

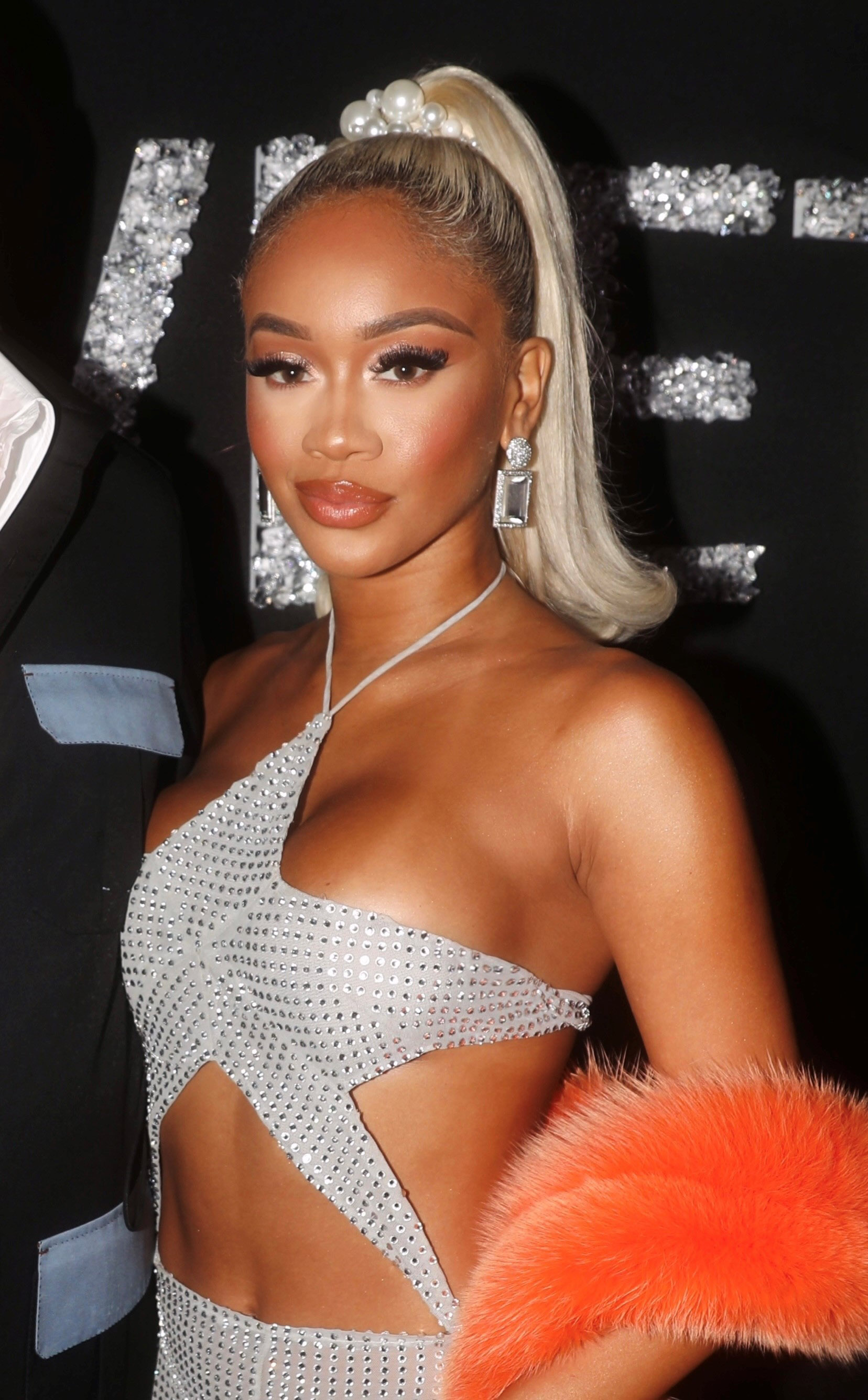
Saweetie

- CC Sabathia (born 1980) – Hall of Fame baseball player
- Katey Sagal (born 1954) – actress (Futurama, Married... with Children)
- Halston Sage (born 1993) – actress
- Andy Samberg (born 1978) – actor and comedian
- Samia – musician
- Daniel Samohin (born 1998) – Israeli Olympic figure skater
- Josh Samuels (born 1991) – Olympic water polo player
- Jessica Sanchez – singer-songwriter
- Sonny Sandoval – musician
- Saweetie – rapper, singer-songwriter
- Monte Scheinblum (born 1967) – 1992 U.S. and world long-driving golf champion
- Eli Schenkel (born 1992) – Canadian Olympic fencer
- Wally Schlotter – film producer
- Casey Schmitt (born 1999) – infielder for the San Francisco Giants
- Rob Schneider – actor
- Schoolboy Q – rapper
- Dave Schultz – Olympic gold medalist in freestyle wrestling
- Mark Schultz – Olympic gold medalist in freestyle wrestling
- Arnold Schwarzenegger (born 1947) – Austrian-American actor, former bodybuilder, businessman, and governor of California (2003–11)
- Patrick Schwarzenegger (born 1993) – actor, model, and son of Maria Shriver and Arnold Schwarzenegger
- Jason Schwartzman (born 1980) – actor
- Cathy Scott – true-crime author, journalist
- Tom Seaver – baseball player
- Logan Seavey – racing driver
- Jason Segel – actor, comedian, screenwriter, and author
- Jason Sehorn – NFL cornerback
- Mike Seidman (born 1981) – NFL tight end
- Vic Seixas (1923–2024) – Hall of Fame former world #1 tennis player
- Edgar Seligman (1867–1958) – San Francisco-born British six-time fencing champion and two-time Olympic fencing medalist
- Christian Serratos – actress (The Walking Dead)
- Adam G. Sevani – actor and dancer
- Atticus Shaffer – actor
- Tupac Shakur – actor/rapper
- Samantha Shapiro (born 1993) – gymnast
- Sharon Shapiro – gymnast
- Judy Shapiro-Ikenberry (born 1942) – long-distance runner
- Ryan Sheckler (born 1989) – skateboarder
- Charlie Sheen (born 1965) – actor
- Marley Shelton (born 1974) – actress
- Art Sherman (born 1937) – horse trainer and jockey
- Richard Sherman (born 1988) – NFL cornerback
- Ryan Sherriff (born 1990) – Major League Baseball pitcher
- Larry Sherry (1935–2006) – baseball pitcher
- Norm Sherry (1931–2021) – catcher, manager, and coach in Major League Baseball
- Mike Shinoda – musician (Linkin Park)
- Jennifer Siebel Newsom – first partner of California, actress, and documentary filmmaker
- Alicia Silverstone – actress (Clueless)
- Jerry Simon (born 1968) – American-Israeli basketball player
- Diamon Simpson (born 1987) – basketball player in the Israel Basketball Premier League
- O. J. Simpson (1947–2024) – football player (Buffalo Bills), actor, and convicted felon
- Simon Singer (born 1941) – world champion American handball player, and radio and television actor
- Nikki Sixx – musician (Mötley Crüe)
- Skrillex – DJ and musician
- Alexandra Slade – actress (Friend of the World)
- Matthew Slater – NFL wide receiver and special teams gunner
- Margaret F. Slusher (1879–1971) – businesswoman
- Cameron Smith – NFL football player
- Jaden Smith – actor, rapper, singer-songwriter
- Regan Smith (born 2002) – Olympic swimmer, broke multiple world records in swimming
- Steve Smith Sr. – NFL wide receiver
- JuJu Smith-Schuster – NFL wide receiver

=== Sn–Sz ===
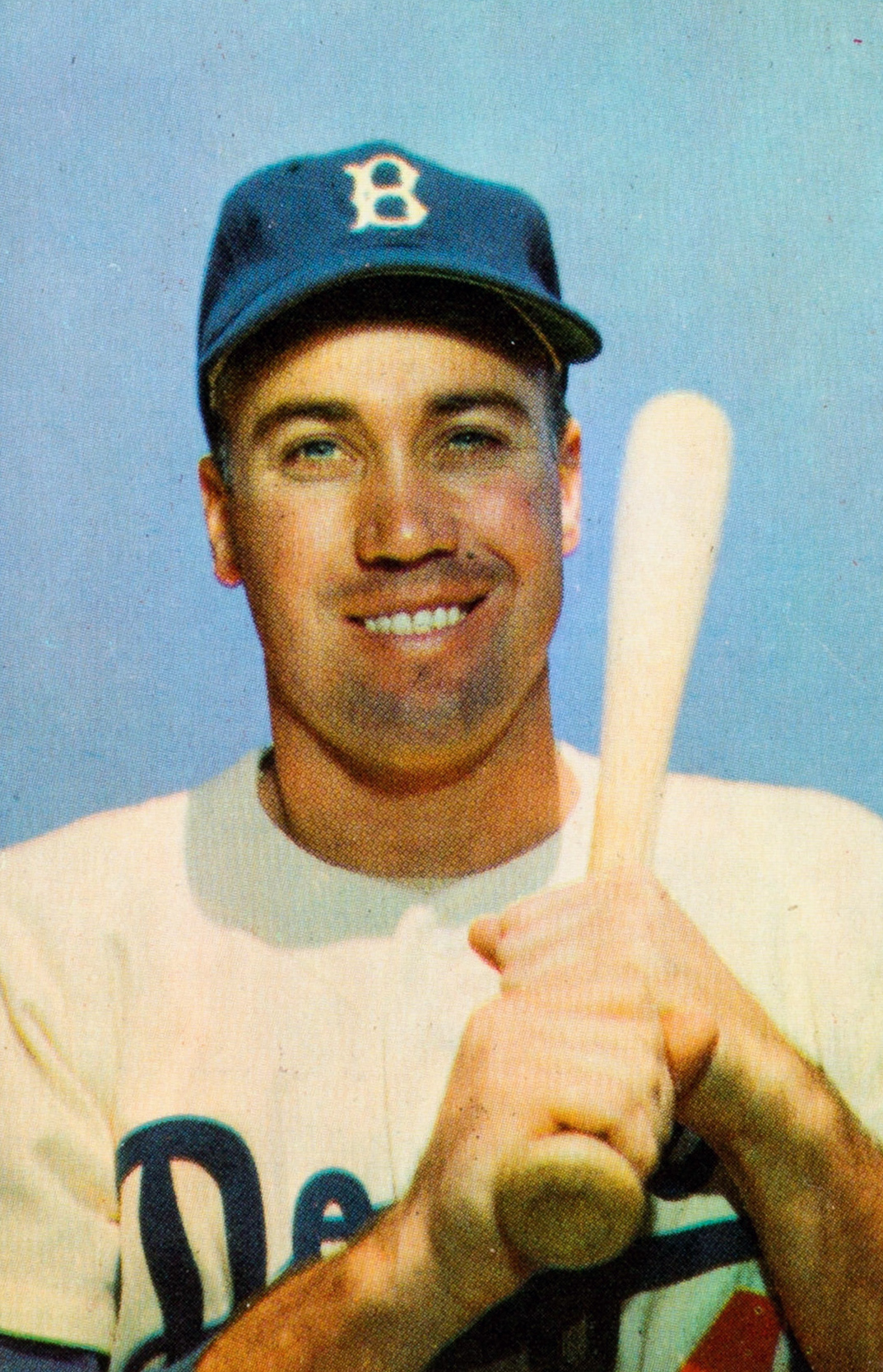
Duke Snider

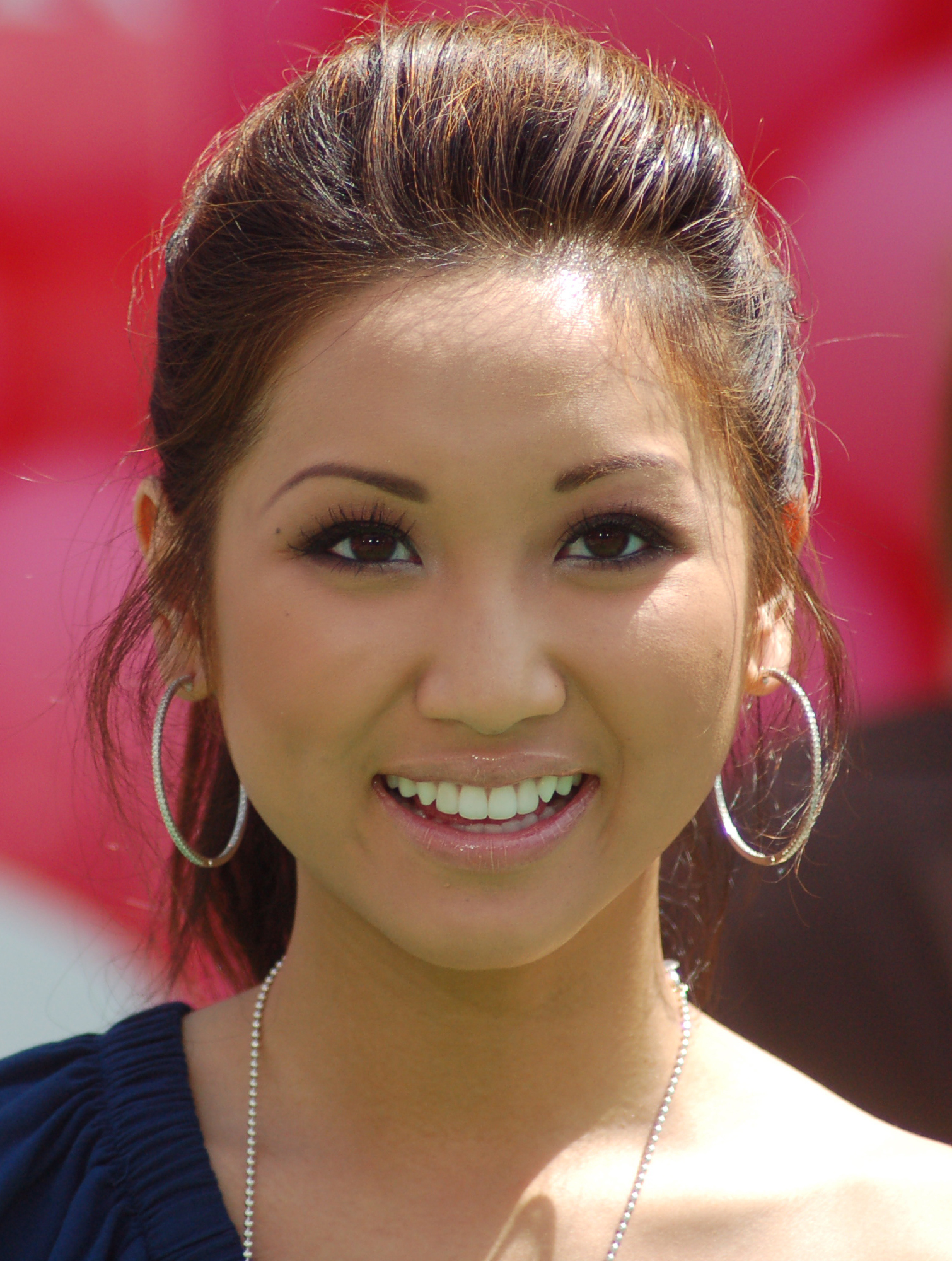
Brenda Song

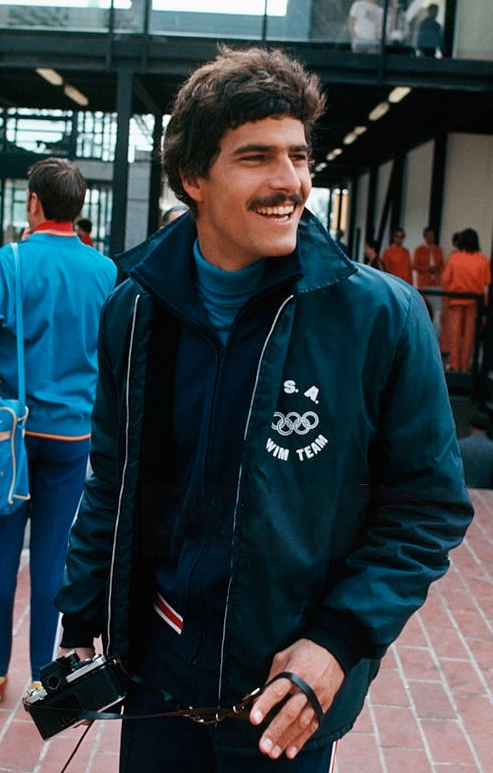
Mark Spitz

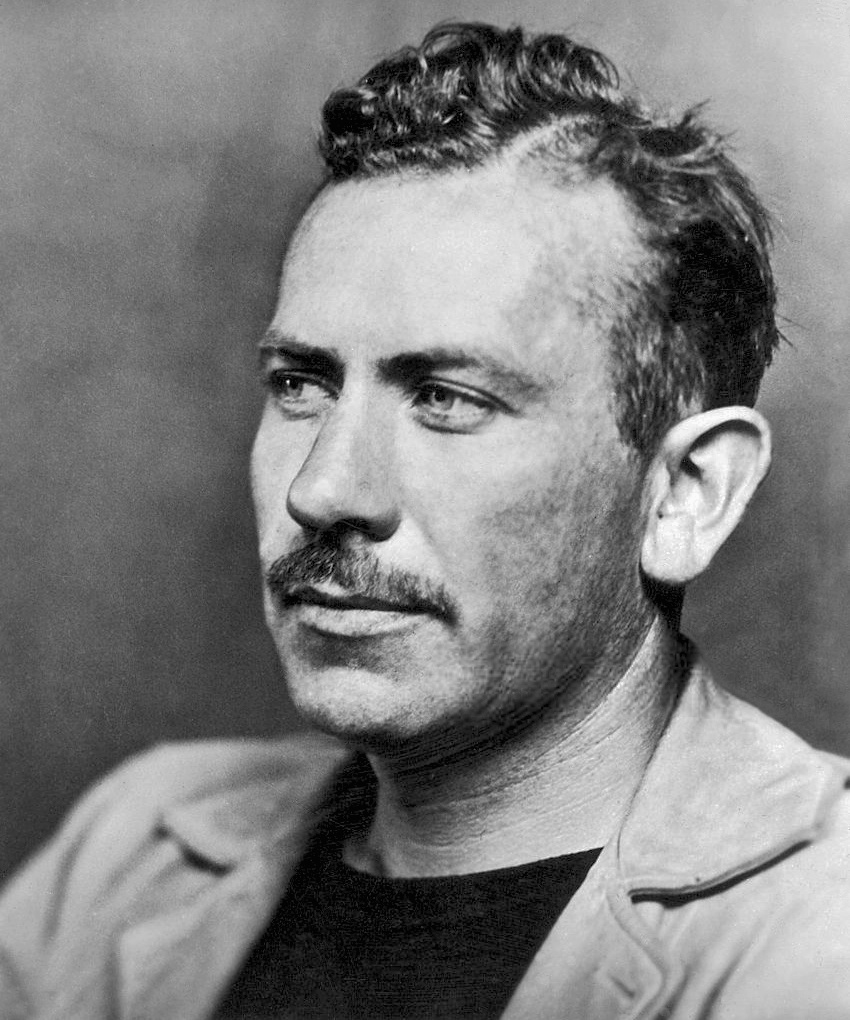
John Steinbeck

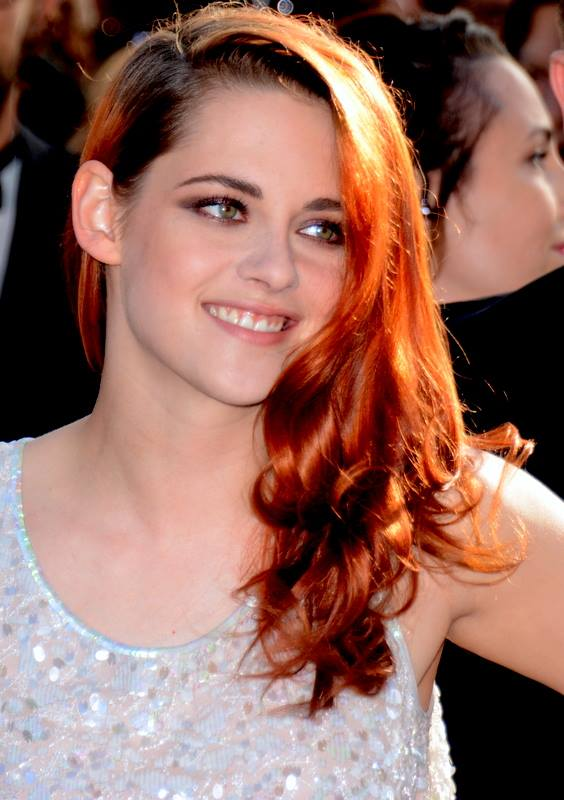
Kristen Stewart

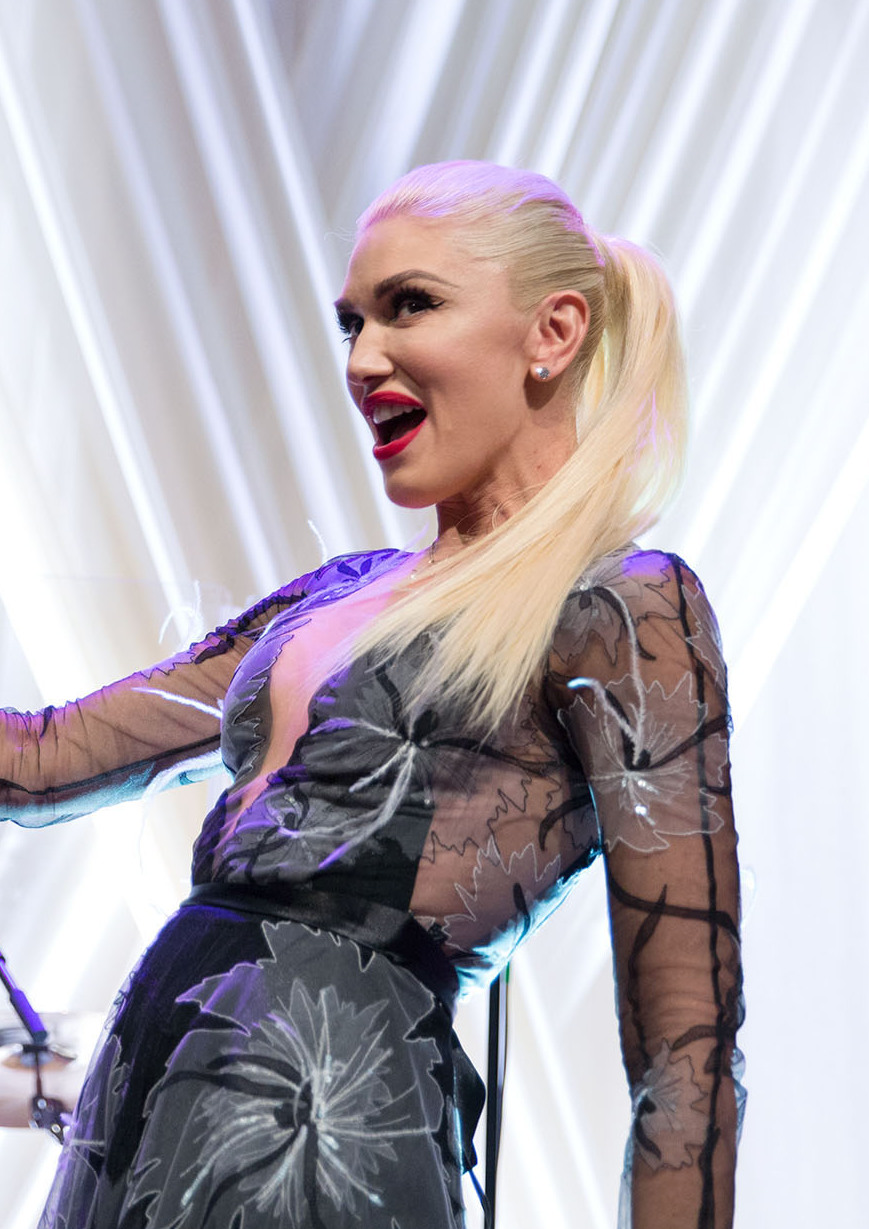
Gwen Stefani

- Duke Snider – baseball player
- Snow Tha Product – rapper
- Anastasia Soare – Romanian-American businesswoman and founder of Anastasia Beverly Hills
- Liza Soberano – Filipino-American actress, model, and singer
- Brenda Song – actress
- Song Oh-kyun – activist
- Chris Soriano – filmmaker and actor (Almighty Zeus, The Wedding Hustler)
- Frank Spellman (1922–2017) – Olympic champion weightlifter
- Mark Spitz (born 1950) – nine-time Olympic gold medalist swimmer
- John Stamos – actor (Full House)
- Leland Stanford – railroad tycoon
- Jeffree Star – makeup artist
- Jesse Jo Stark – singer and actress
- Martin Starr – actor
- Gwen Stefani – singer-songwriter, and fashion designer
- Maggie Steffens (born 1993) – professional water polo player, two-time Olympic gold medalist
- John Steinbeck (1902–1968) – author (East of Eden, Of Mice and Men)
- Max Steinberg (1989–2014) – American-Israeli IDF lone soldier killed in the 2014 Gaza War
- Hailee Steinfeld – actress, singer-songwriter
- Amandla Stenberg – actress
- Rosie Stephenson-Goodknight – Wikipedian
- Daniel Steres (born 1990) – professional soccer player with the LA Galaxy
- Brett Sterling (born 1984) – NHL ice hockey player
- Minna Stess (born 2006) – Olympic skateboarder
- Todd Steussie (born 1970) – NFL football player
- Ted Stevens (1923–2010) – U.S. senator from Alaska (1968–2009) and solicitor of the Department of Interior (1960–61)
- Booboo Stewart – actor
- Fivel Stewart – actress
- Kristen Stewart – actress
- Lindsey Stirling – violinist
- Robert Stock (born 1989) – Major League Baseball baseball pitcher
- Spencer Stone – US Air Force staff sergeant known for stopping a gunman in a Paris-bound train from Amsterdam; author of The 15:17 to Paris: The True Story of a Terrorist, a Train, and Three American Heroes
- Melvin Storer – Navy diver and shipfitter
- Jackson Stormo (born 1999) – basketball player in the Israeli Basketball Premier League
- Darryl Strawberry (born 1962) – MLB baseball outfielder
- Sean Strickland (born 1991) – professional mixed martial artist
- CJ Stubbs (born 1996) – Major League Baseball catcher for the Washington Nationals
- Garrett Stubbs (born 1993) – Major League Baseball catcher for the Philadelphia Phillies
- Michael Stuhlbarg – actor
- Beaumelle Sturtevant-Peet – temperance activist and suffragist
- Jeremy Sumpter – actor
- Stephen Swartz – singer and musician
- Alison Sweeney – actress (Days of Our Lives)
- Jodie Sweetin – actress (Full House)
- Emelie Tracy Y. Swett (1863–1892) – poet, author, educator

== T ==
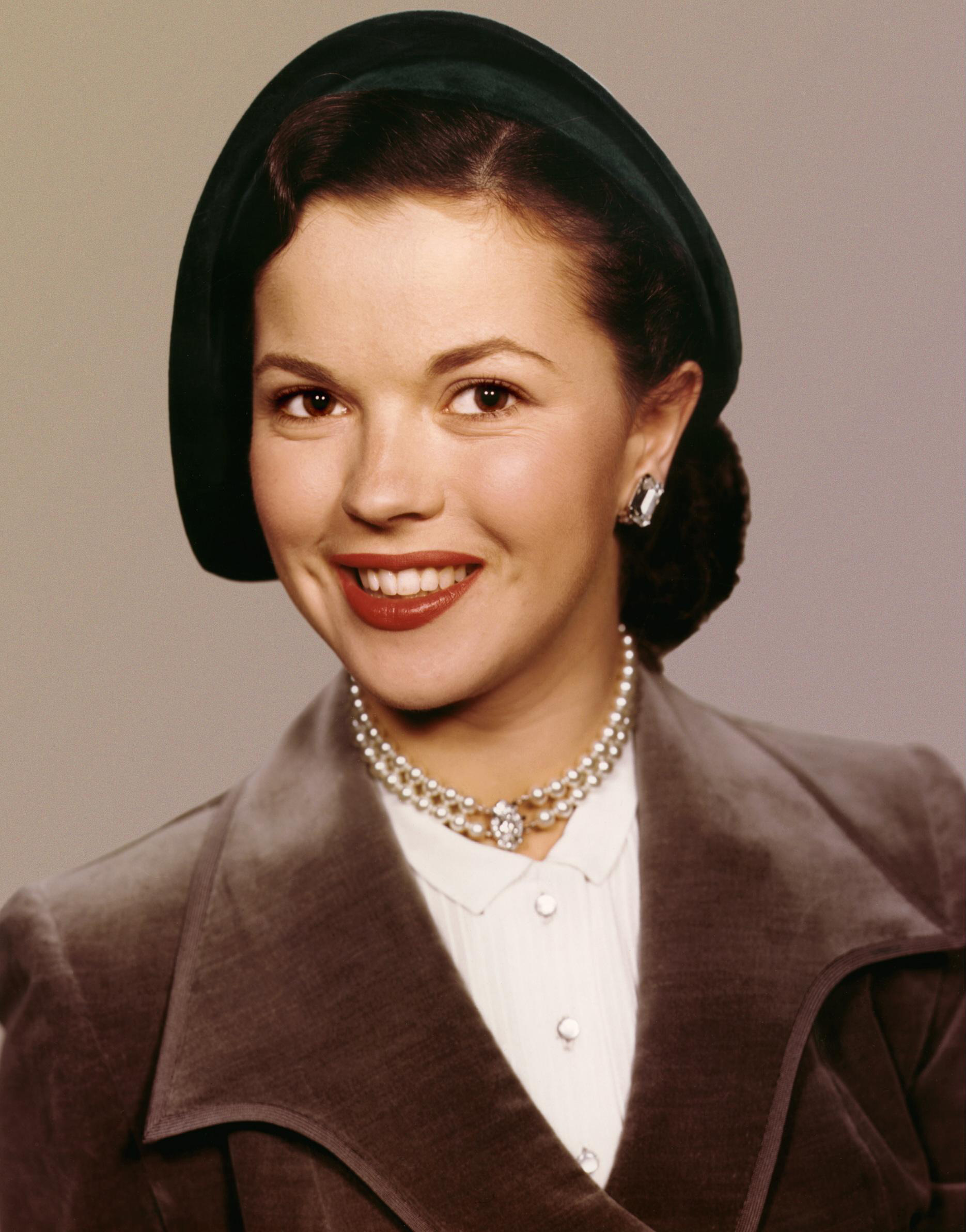
Shirley Temple

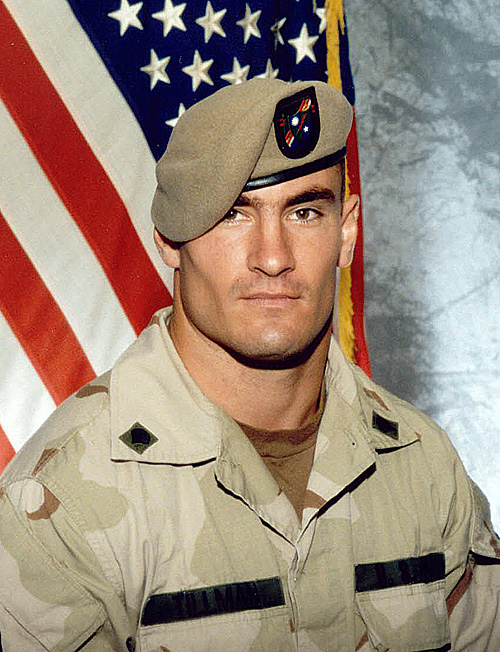
Pat Tillman

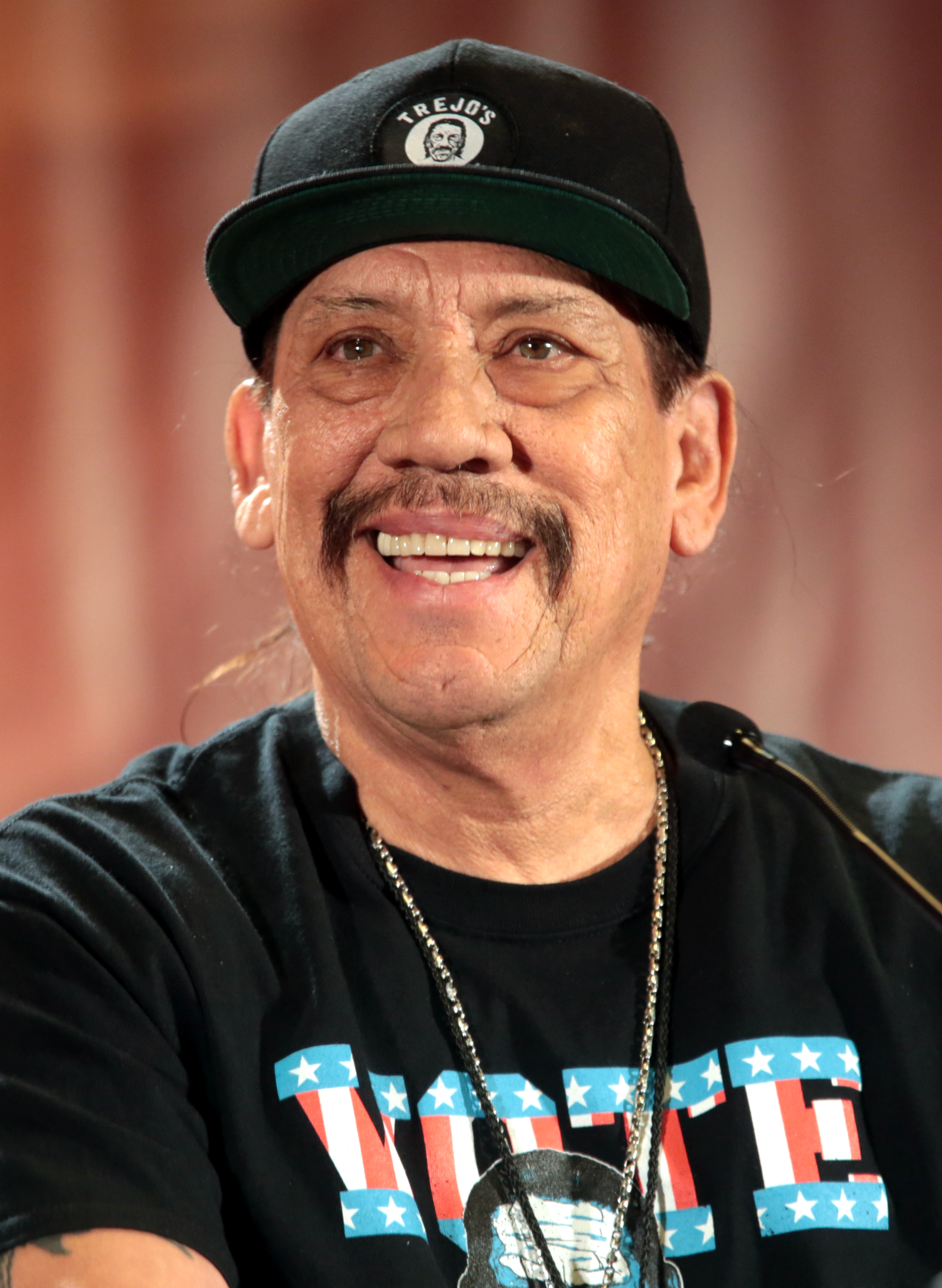
Danny Trejo

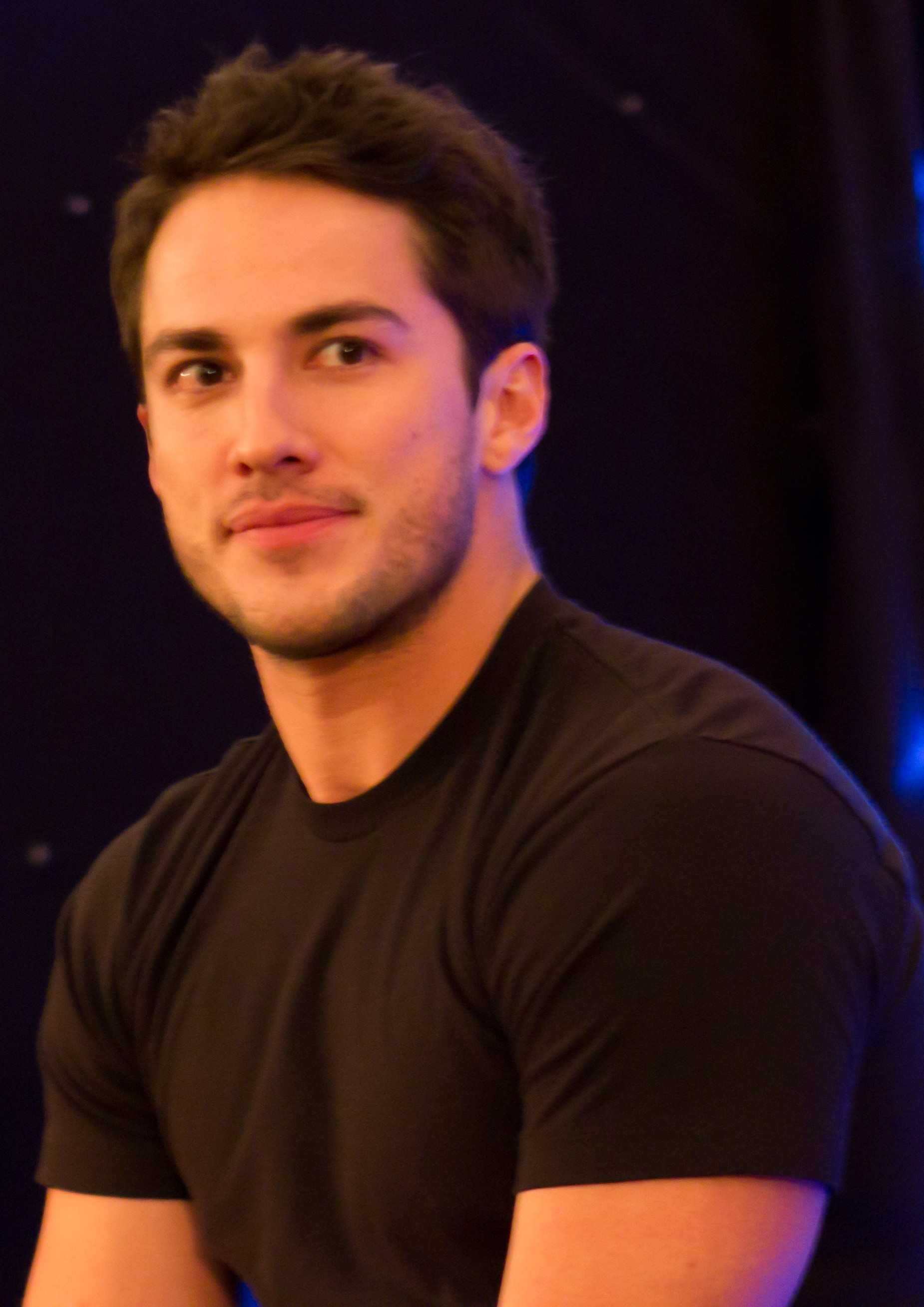
Michael Trevino

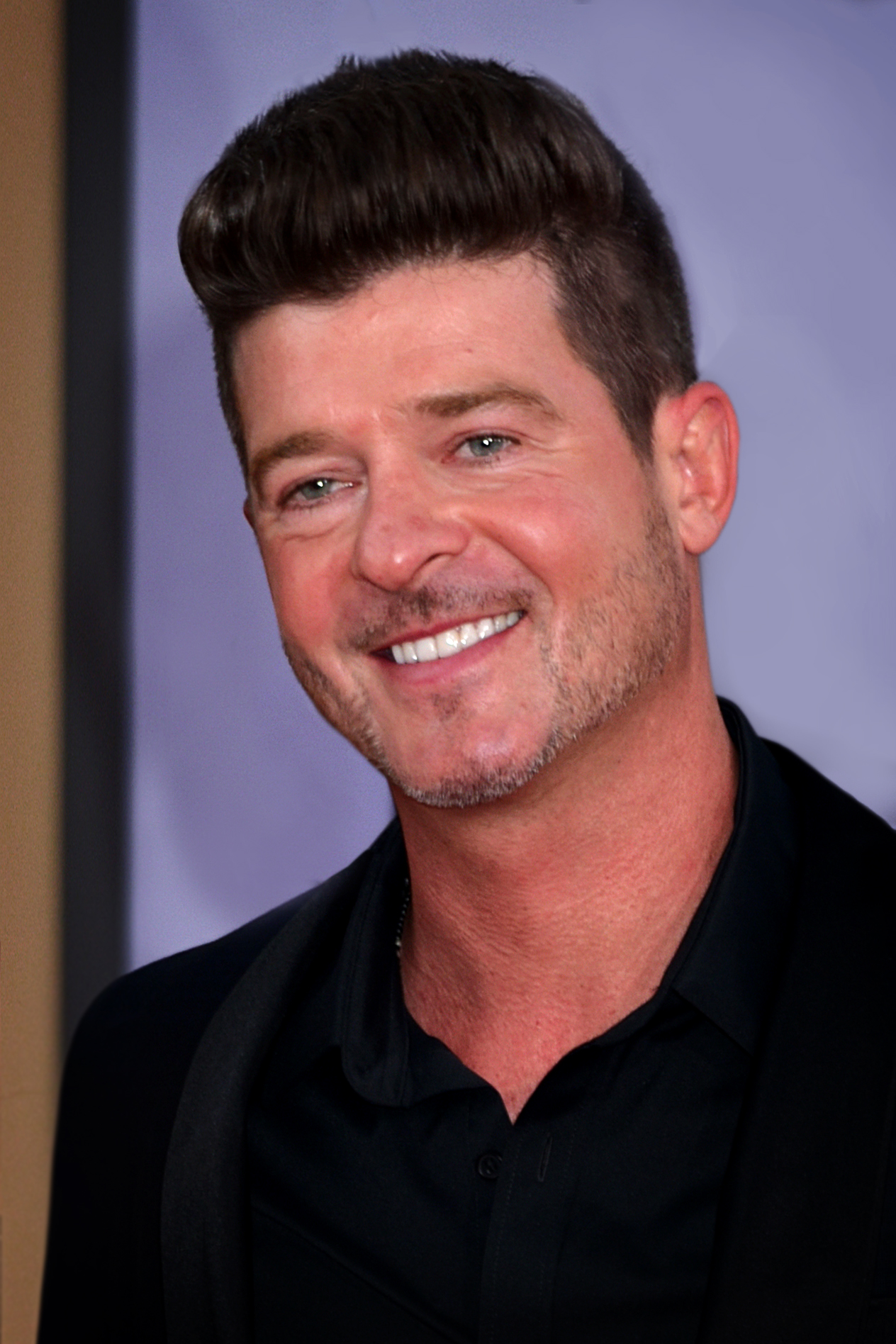
Robin Thicke

- Amber Tamblyn – actress (Joan of Arcadia)
- Russ Tamblyn – actor (West Side Story)
- Amy Tan – writer (The Joy Luck Club)
- Deshon Taylor (born 1996), basketball player for Hapoel Haifa of the Israeli Basketball Premier League
- Isaiah Taylor (born 1994) – basketball player in the Israeli Basketball Premier League
- Shannon Taylor – film producer (The Flourish)
- Scout Taylor-Compton – actress (Halloween)
- Brian Teacher – tennis player (ranked as high as # 7), Australian Open champion, and coach
- Technoblade – YouTuber (1999–2022)
- TeeFlii – rapper and producer
- Aimee Teegarden – actress and model
- Rowdy Tellez – baseball player
- Eliot Teltscher – tennis player
- Shirley Temple – child film star, former U.S. ambassador to Ghana and Czechoslovakia
- Zack Test – rugby union player
- Reggie Theus – basketball player and coach
- Robin Thicke – singer and record producer
- Nosaj Thing – producer
- Klay Thompson – basketball player (Dallas Mavericks)
- Stephen Thompson Jr. (born 1997) – basketball player in the Israeli Basketball Premier League
- Tessa Thompson – actress
- Rawson Marshall Thurber – filmmaker and actor
- Pat Tillman – football player and soldier
- Jennifer Tilly – actress and poker player
- Justin Timberlake – singer
- Tinashe – singer
- Kenneth Tobey – actor
- Mark Tollefsen (born 1992) – basketball player, 2018–19 top scorer in the Israel Basketball Premier League
- Shaun Tomson (born 1955) – South African world champion surfer
- Too Short – rapper
- Pat Toomay – former football player
- Dara Torres (born 1967) – competitive swimmer, first American swimmer to become a five-time Olympian
- Alessandra Torresani – actress
- Josie Totah – actress
- Toypurina – Native American medicine woman
- Alan Trammell – baseball player
- Karrueche Tran – actress and model
- Kelly Marie Tran – actress (Star Wars: The Last Jedi, Raya and the Last Dragon)
- Danny Trejo – actor
- Michael Trevino – actor
- Ian Tripp – filmmaker (Everybody Dies by the End, Sincerely Saul)
- Michael Trucco – actor (Battlestar Galactica)
- Robert Trujillo – bassist (Metallica)
- Mark Tuan – rapper
- Dakarai Tucker (born 1994) – basketball player in the Israeli Basketball Premier League
- Lisa Tucker – singer
- Ryan Turell (born 1999) – basketball player for the G-League Motor City Cruise, Yeshiva University
- Mark Turenshine (1944–2016) – American-Israeli basketball player
- Christy Turlington – model
- Bree Turner – actress (Grimm)
- Justin Turner – baseball player
- Ty Dolla Sign – rapper
- Tyga – rapper, singer-songwriter, and actor
- Aisha Tyler – actress
- Tyler, the Creator – rapper and record producer (Odd Future)

== U ==
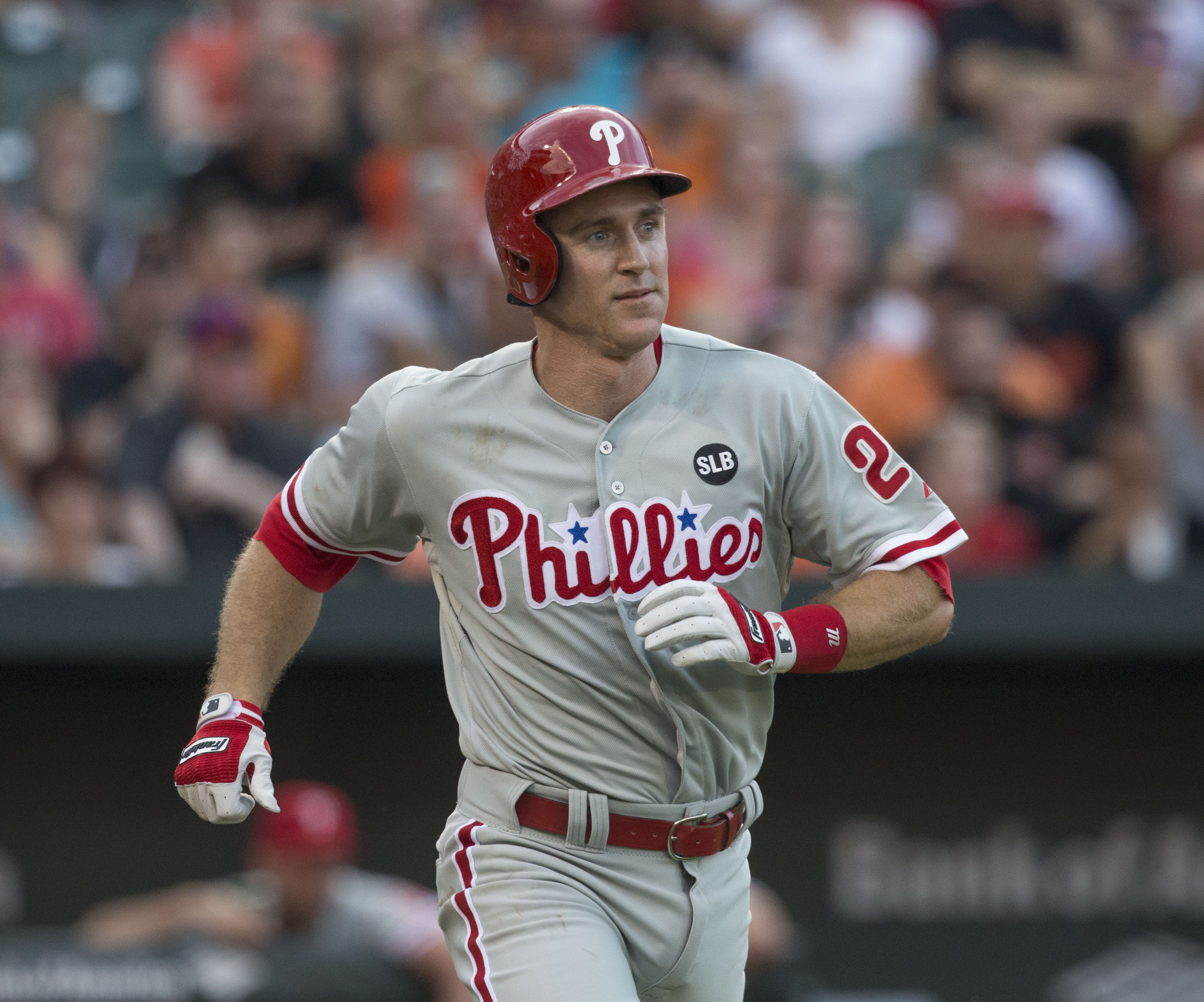
Chase Utley

- Alanna Ubach – actress
- Ben Underwood – blind teen best known as one of the world's most proficient echolocators
- The Usos (Jey and Jimmy) – professional wrestlers
- Chase Utley – baseball player
- Edred Utomi – actor

== V ==
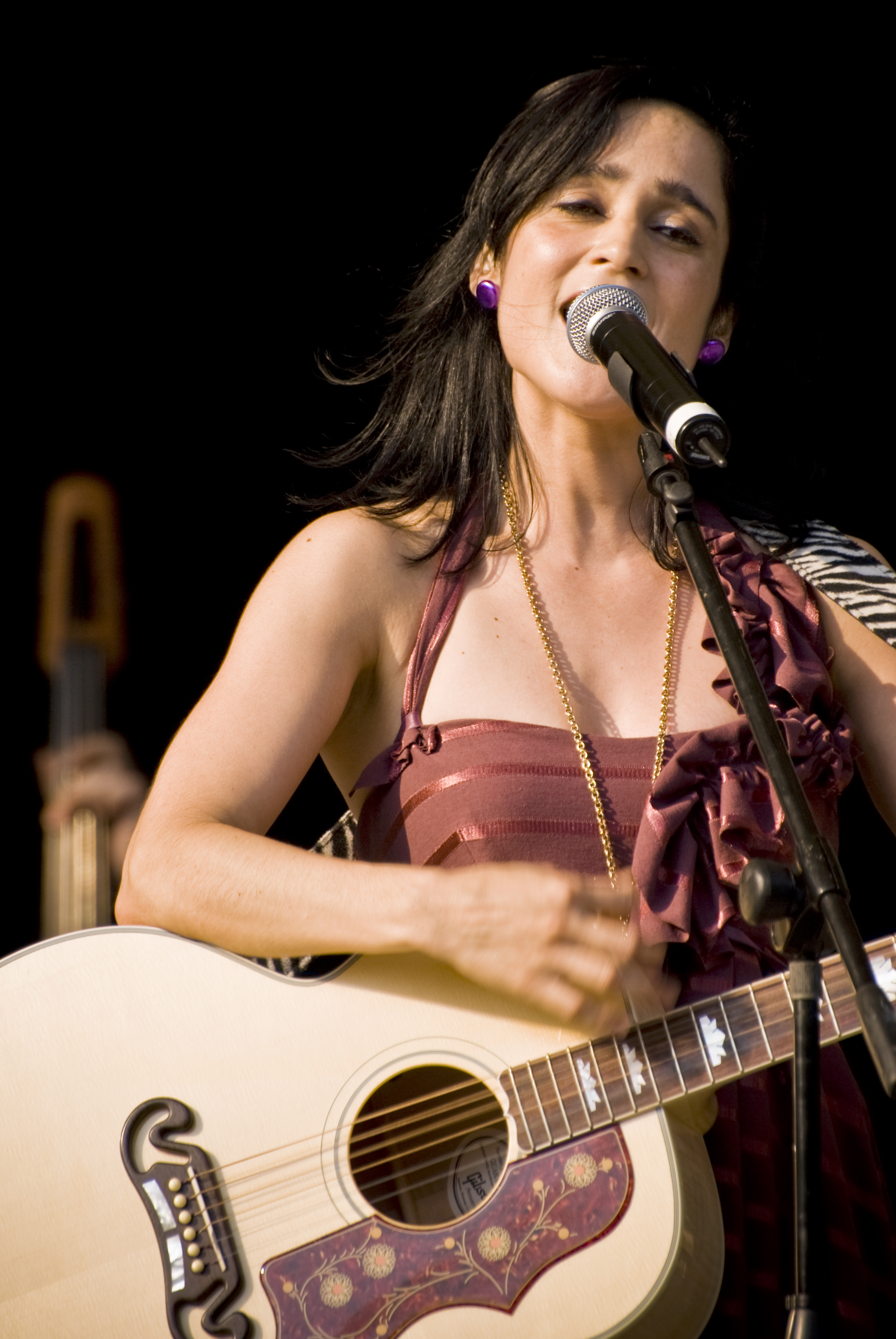
Julieta Venegas

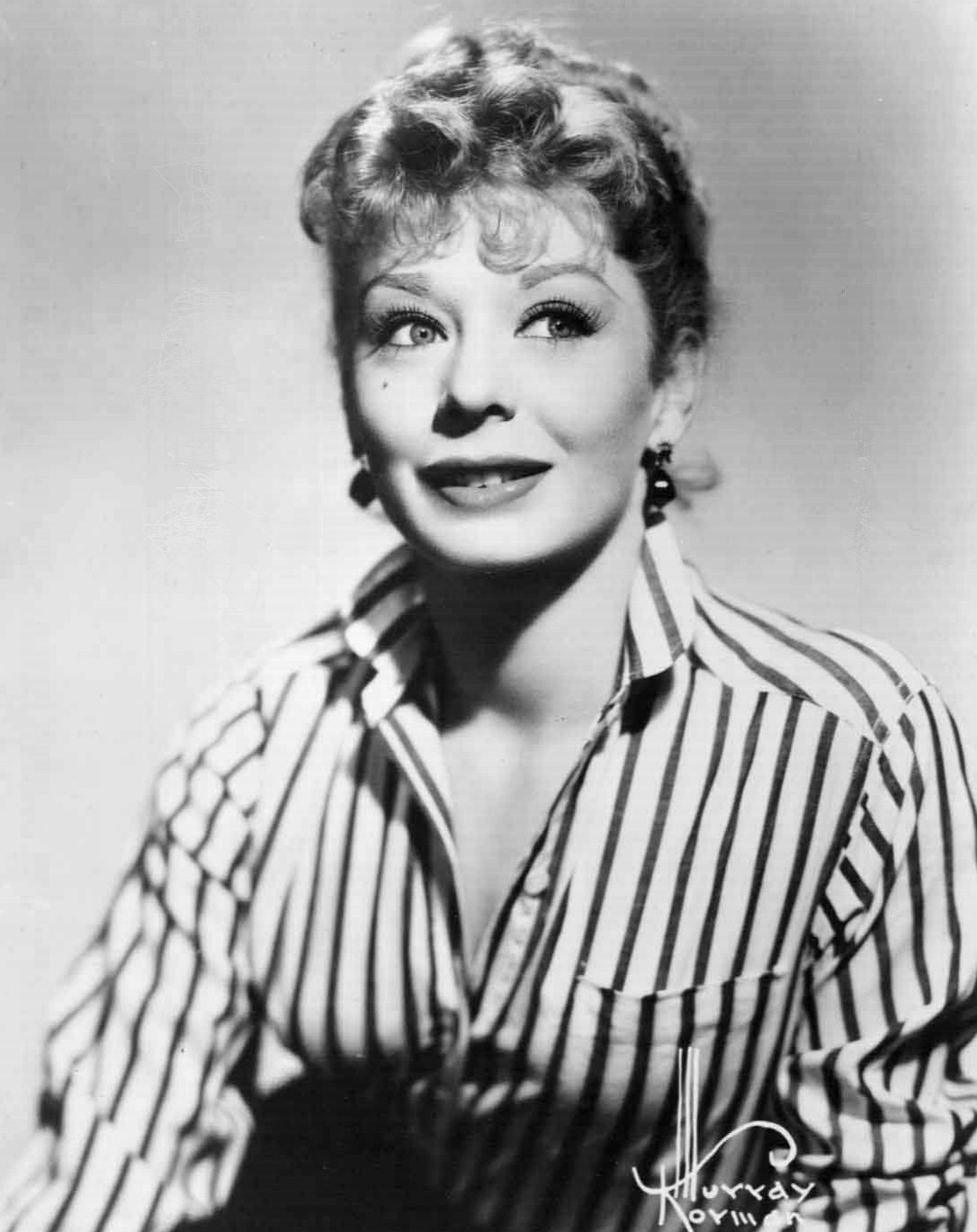
Gwen Verdon

- Jasmine V – singer
- Aaron Valdes (born 1993) – basketball player in the Israeli Basketball Premier League
- Ritchie Valens – singer
- Karen Valentine – actress
- Mariano Guadalupe Vallejo – Mexican general and American politician
- Grace Van Dien – actress
- Jason Vargas – baseball pitcher for the Philadelphia Phillies
- Elle Varner – singer
- Jake Varner – Olympic freestyle wrestler, gold medalist at 2012 Summer Olympics
- Andrew Vasquez – Native American flute player
- Jhonen Vasquez – comic-book writer and artist
- Jovan Vavic – USC water polo coach
- Alicia Vela-Bailey (born 1982) – stunt performer, stunt double, actress, dancer, and choreographer
- Cain Velasquez – professional wrestler
- Stephen Venard – lawman
- Julieta Venegas – singer and musician
- Milo Ventimiglia – actor
- Ken Venturi – golfer
- Gwen Verdon – actress
- Victoria Vetri – model and actress
- Robert M. Viale – U.S. Medal of Honor recipient
- Antonio Villaraigosa – 51st mayor of Los Angeles
- Danielle von Zerneck – actress
- Roy Marlin Voris – World War II flying ace and founder of the United States Navy Blue Angels

== W ==
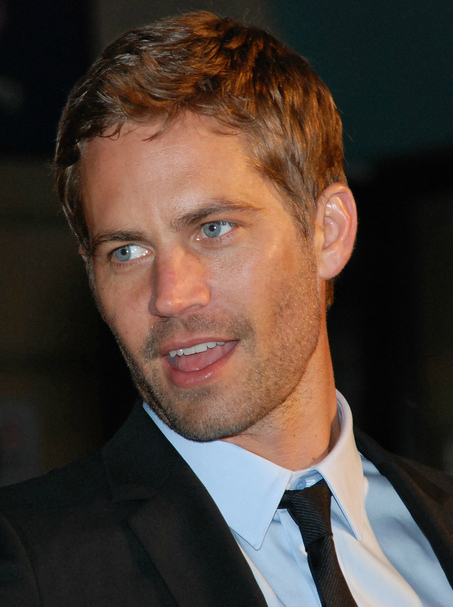
Paul Walker

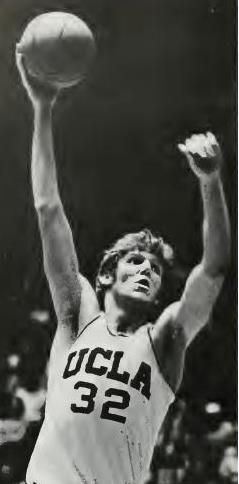
Bill Walton

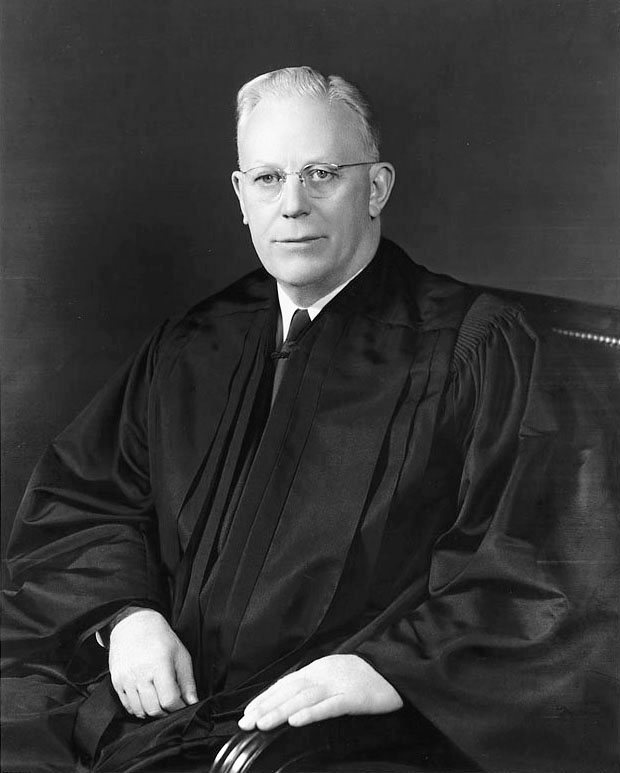
Earl Warren

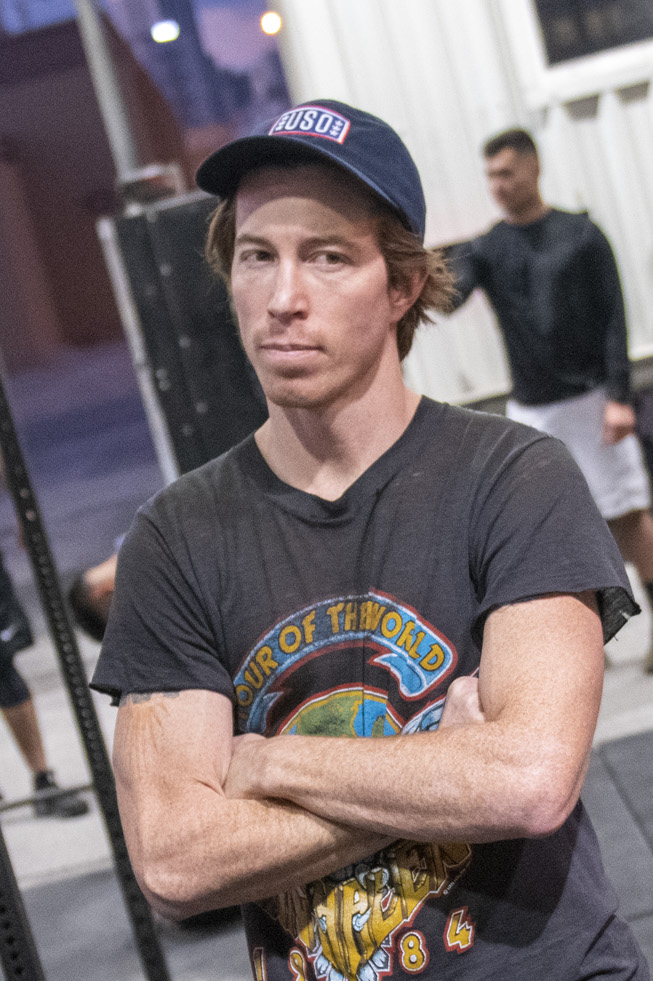
Shaun White

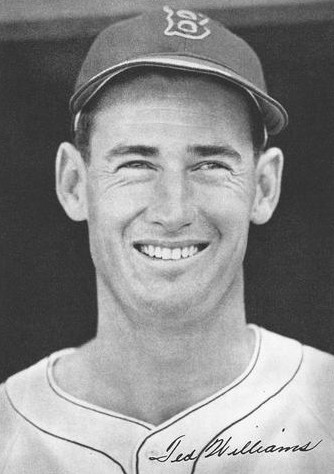
Ted Williams

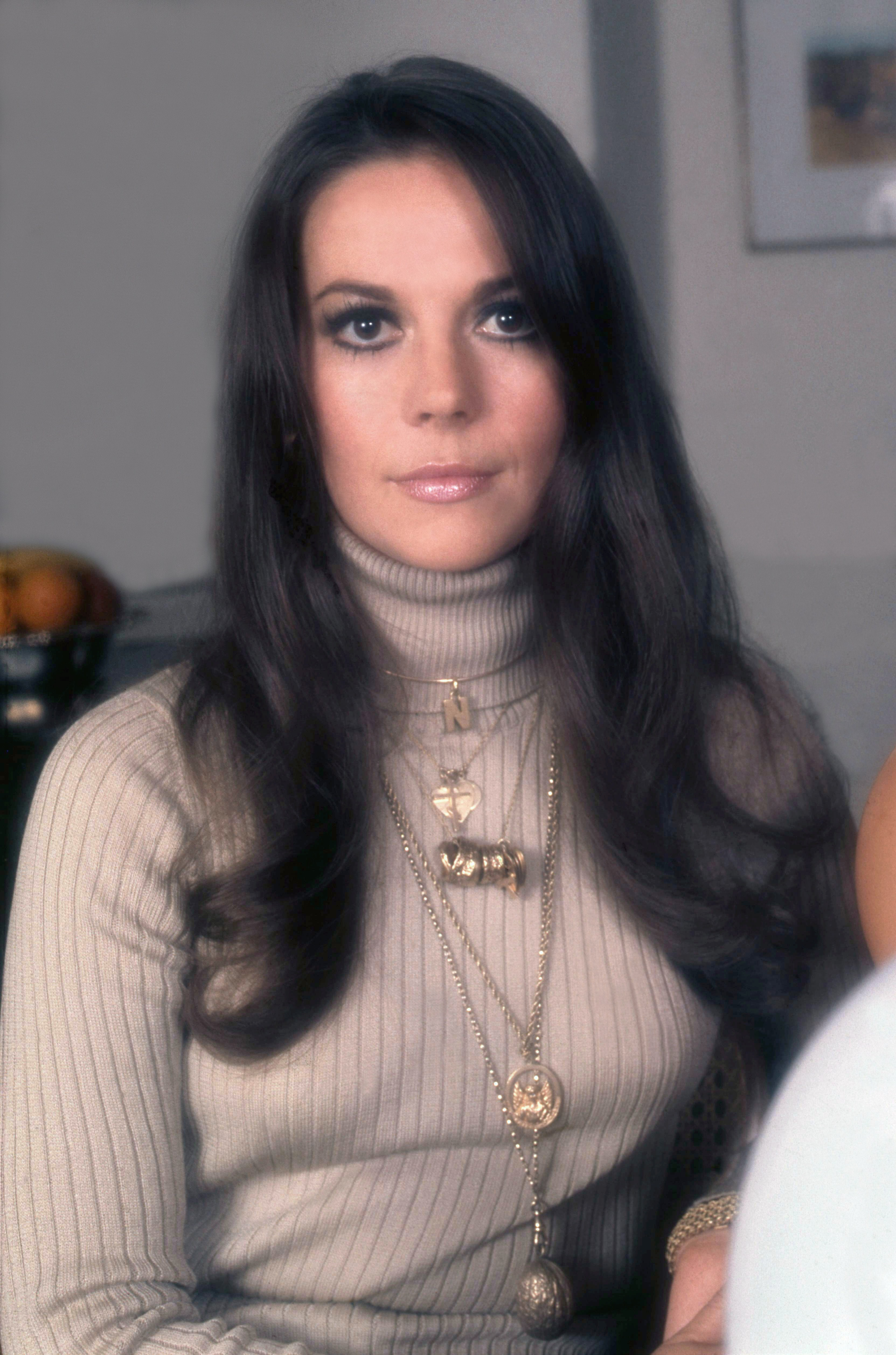
Natalie Wood

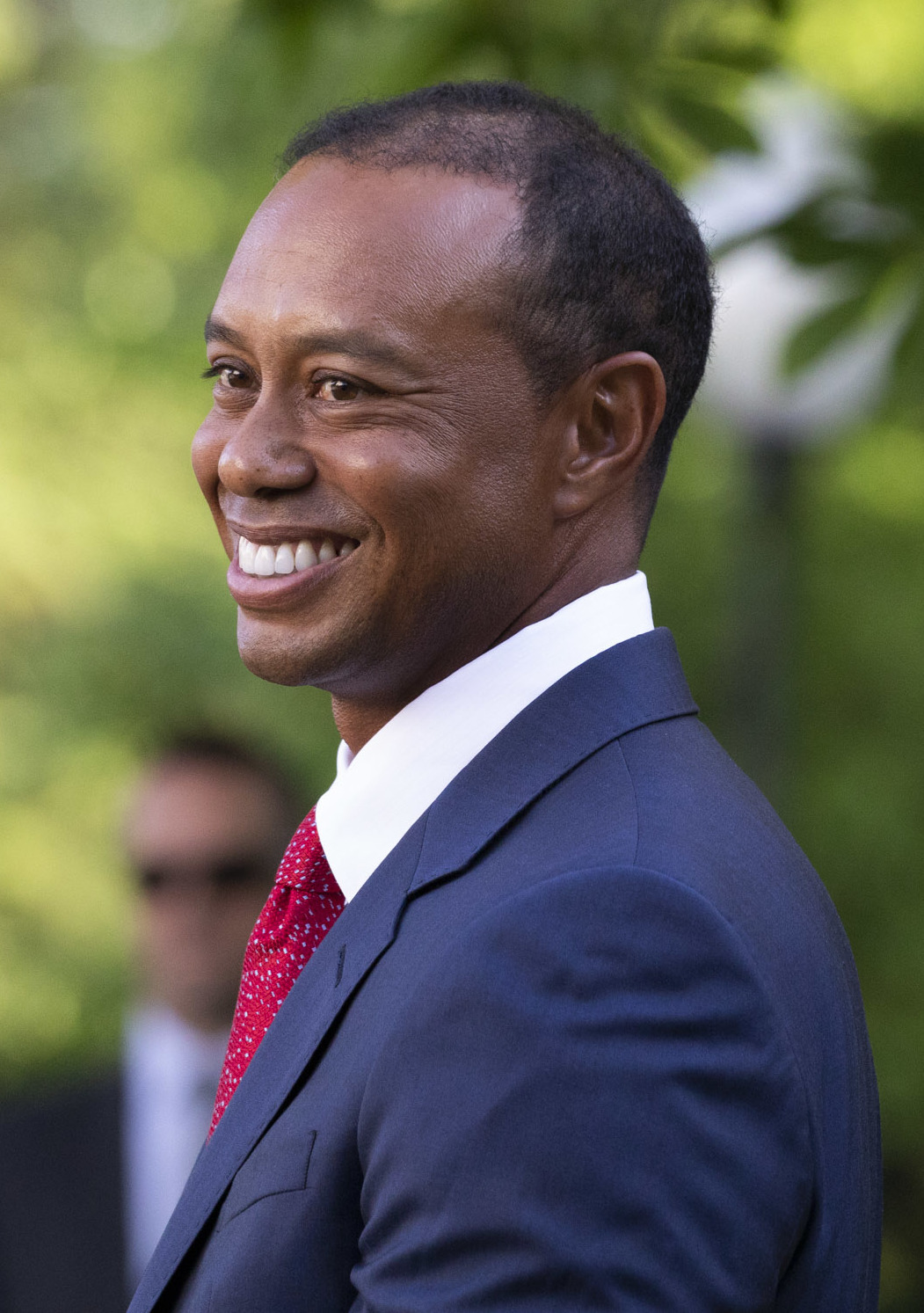
Tiger Woods

- Rachel Wacholder (born 1975) – professional beach volleyball player and model
- Aly Wagner – retired soccer player
- Bobby Wagner – NFL linebacker
- Lindsay Wagner – actress
- Tom Waits – musician and composer
- Paul Walker – actor (The Fast and the Furious)
- William Wall – filmmaker (Daisy Belle)
- Bill Walsh – football coach
- Laurie Walters – actress (Eight Is Enough)
- Bill Walton – Hall of Fame basketball player
- Luke Walton – basketball player and coach
- Andre Ward – 2004 Summer Olympics gold medal–winning boxer
- Fred Ward – actor (Tremors)
- Zhavia Ward – singer
- Alex Warren – singer
- Earl Warren – 30th governor of California and 14th Chief Justice of the United States (1953–1969)
- Rick Warren – pastor and author
- Ryn Weaver – singer
- Stormi Webster – Kylie Jenner’s daughter
- Whitney Wegman-Wood – actress and screenwriter (The Last Butterflies)
- Scott Weiland – singer-songwriter
- Caspar Weinberger – United States Secretary of Defense
- Kimberly Weinberger – actress (Hemet, or the Landlady Don't Drink Tea)
- Phil Weintraub (1907–1987) – Major League Baseball first baseman and outfielder
- Bob Weir – musician (Grateful Dead)
- Zack Weiss – American-Israeli Major League Baseball player
- Abbey Weitzeil – Olympic swimmer
- Brian Welch – musician and guitarist (Korn)
- Raquel Welch – Golden Globe Award–winning actress (Right to Die)
- North West – musician
- Chanel West Coast – television personality, rapper, and singer
- Russell Westbrook – basketball player (Sacramento Kings)
- Adam Wheeler – Olympic Greco-Roman wrestler
- Jill Whelan – actress (Airplane!)
- Stephen Girard Whipple – 49er, newspaper editor, Union Army officer, and politician
- Shaun White – snowboarder
- Mae Whitman – actress and singer
- Brandon Whitt – NASCAR driver
- Sidney Wicks – basketball player
- Jordan Wilimovsky (born 1994) – Olympic pool swimmer and open water swimmer
- will.i.am – rapper, singer-songwriter, record producer, entrepreneur, actor, and member of The Black Eyed Peas
- Barry Williams – actor (The Brady Bunch)
- Derrick Williams – basketball player with Maccabi Tel Aviv of the Israeli Basketball Premier League and the EuroLeague; formerly with five NBA teams
- Emily Williams – early 20th-century architect
- Esther Williams – actress
- Jamaal Williams – football player
- John Williams – composer
- Paul Williams – architect
- Serena Williams – tennis player
- Ted Williams – Hall of Fame baseball player
- Venus Williams – tennis player
- Dave Williamson – stand-up comedian
- Dontrelle Willis – baseball player (Miami Marlins)
- Helen Wills – tennis player
- Brian Wilson – musician (The Beach Boys)
- Carl Wilson – musician (The Beach Boys)
- Rita Wilson – actress
- Jacarra Winchester – world champion in women's freestyle wrestling
- Ariel Winter – actress (Modern Family)
- Josh Wise – NASCAR driver
- Jeff Withey (born 1990) – player for Hapoel Tel Aviv of the Israeli Premier League
- Tamara Witmer – model
- Zachary Wohlman – boxer
- Wally Wolf (1930–1997) – swimmer, water polo player, and Olympic champion
- Matthew Wolff – professional golfer
- Nat Wolff – actor and musician
- Sara Wolfkind – actress (Grimcutty)
- Chris Wondolowski – professional soccer player
- Ali Wong – stand-up comedian and actress
- Linda Wong – pornographic actress
- Victor Wong (1906–1972) – actor (King Kong)
- Victor Wong (1927–2001) – actor (Big Trouble in Little China)
- Kevin Woo – singer and television personality (U-KISS)
- Beatrice Wood – artist
- Natalie Wood – actress (This Property Is Condemned)
- David Woodard – conductor and writer
- John Wooden – college basketball coach
- Cynthia Woodhead – swimmer
- Shailene Woodley – actress
- Tiger Woods – golfer
- Steve Wozniak – inventor of the Apple Computer
- Jason Wright – American football player and executive
- Noah Wyle – actor (ER, The Librarian, Falling Skies, The Pitt)

== X ==
- Lil Xan – rapper

== Y ==
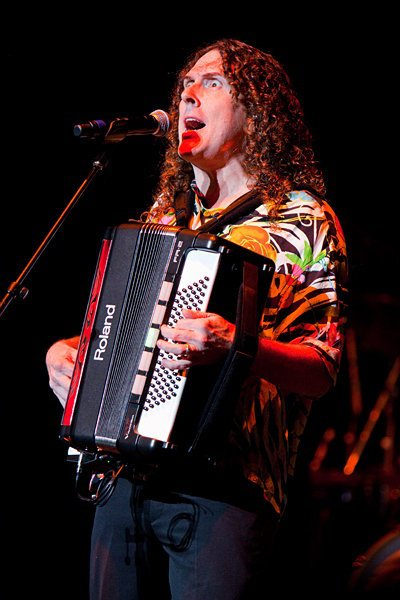
"Weird Al" Yankovic

- Kristi Yamaguchi – professional figure skater
- Elliott Yamin – singer
- Jenny Y Yang – chemist
- "Weird Al" Yankovic – parodist and musician
- Steve Yeager – Major League Baseball catcher
- Yeat – rapper
- Anton Yelchin – actor
- YG – rapper and actor
- Charlyne Yi – actress and comedian
- Tina Yothers – actress (Family Ties)
- Kevin Youkilis – All-Star Major League Baseball player
- Adrian Young – No Doubt's drummer
- Cameron Young (born 1996) – basketball player for Hapoel Haifa of the Israeli Basketball Premier League
- Emily Mae Young – actress
- Nick Young – actor (Friend of the World)
- Nick Young – professional basketball player
- Joon Yun – radiologist

== Z ==
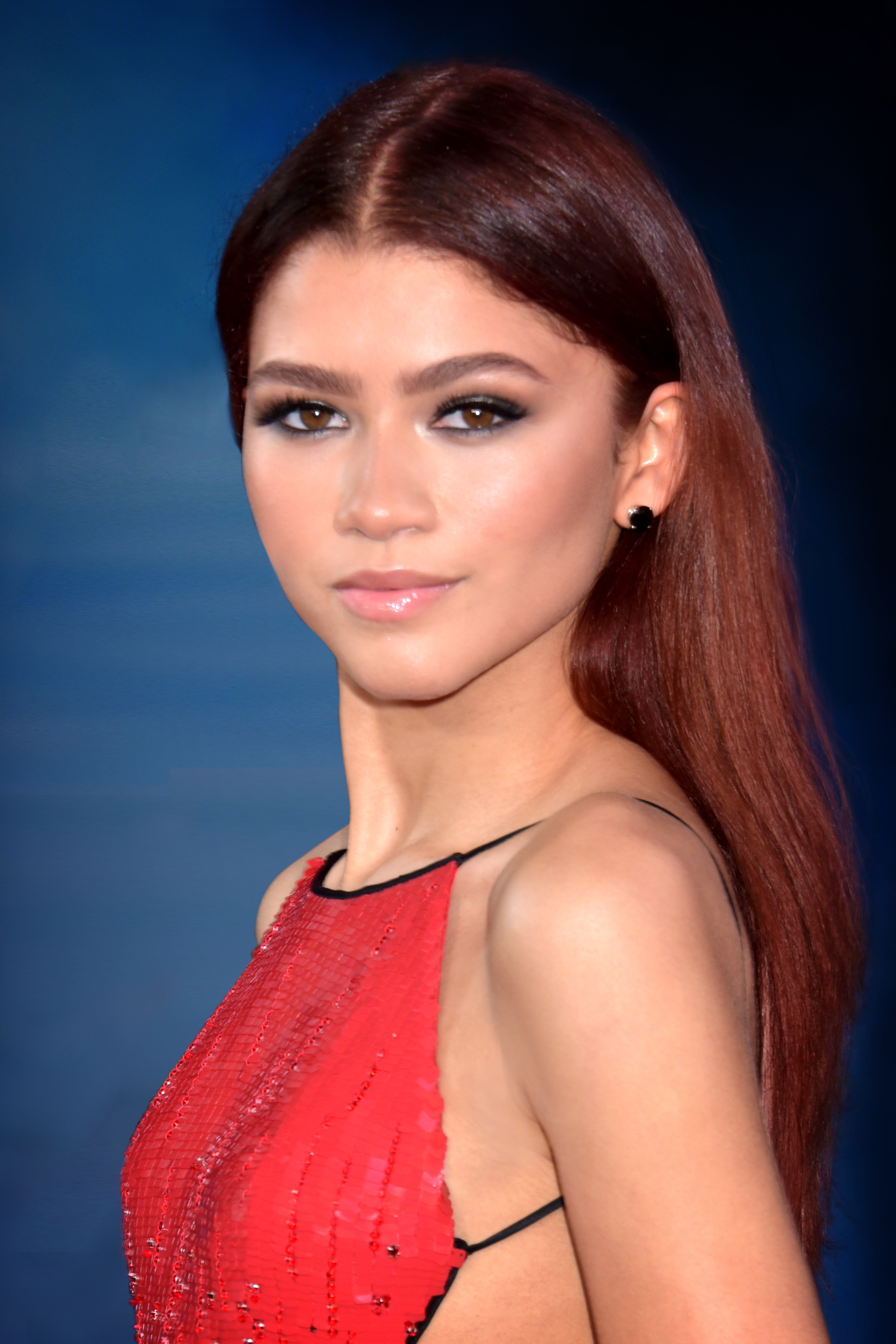
Zendaya

- Frank Zamboni – inventor
- Louis Zamperini – Olympic athlete and army officer
- Joanna Zeiger – Olympic and world champion triathlete, and author
- Zendaya – actress and singer
- Anthony Zerbe – actor
- ZHU – electronic music producer and singer
- Zoya – folk singer
- Elmo Zumwalt – Chief of Naval Operations
- Daphne Zuniga – actress

== Musical groups ==
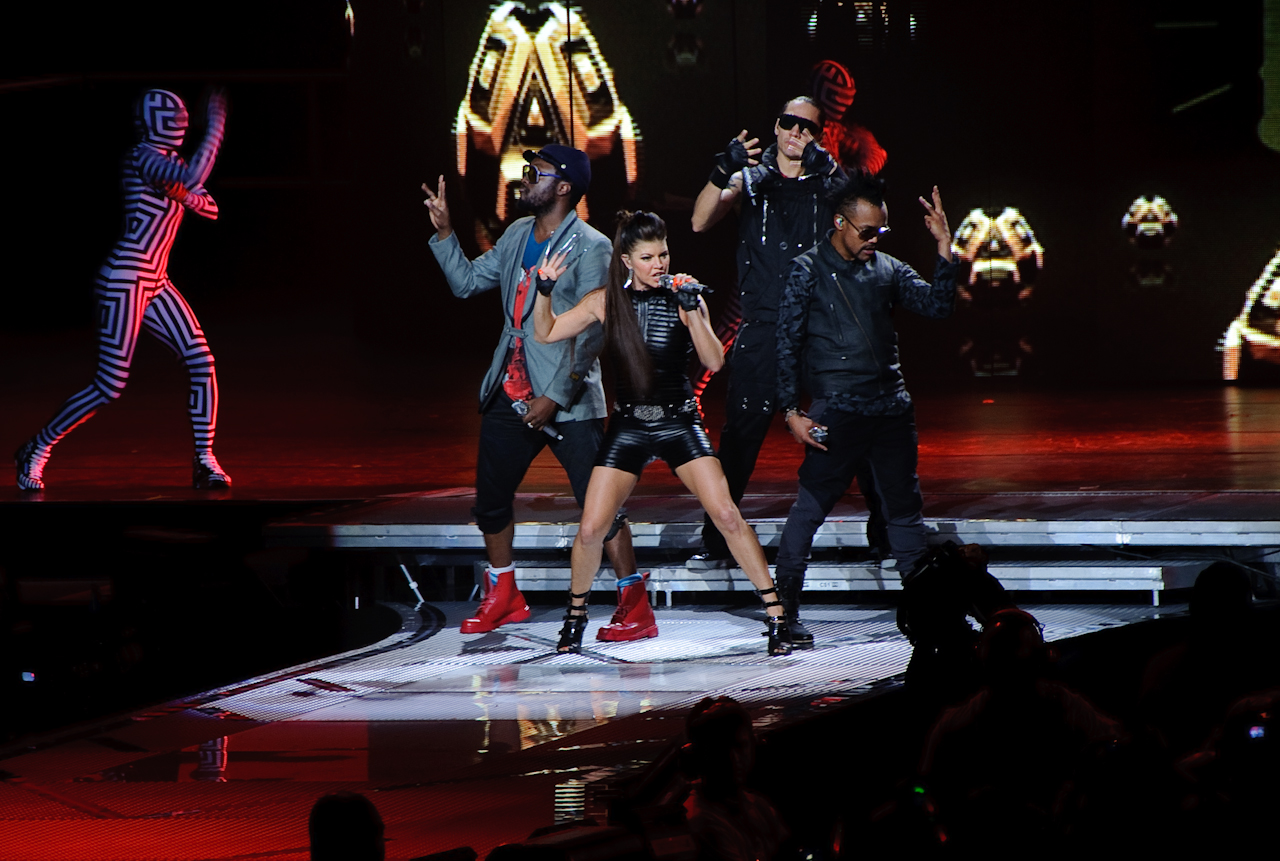
Black Eyed Peas

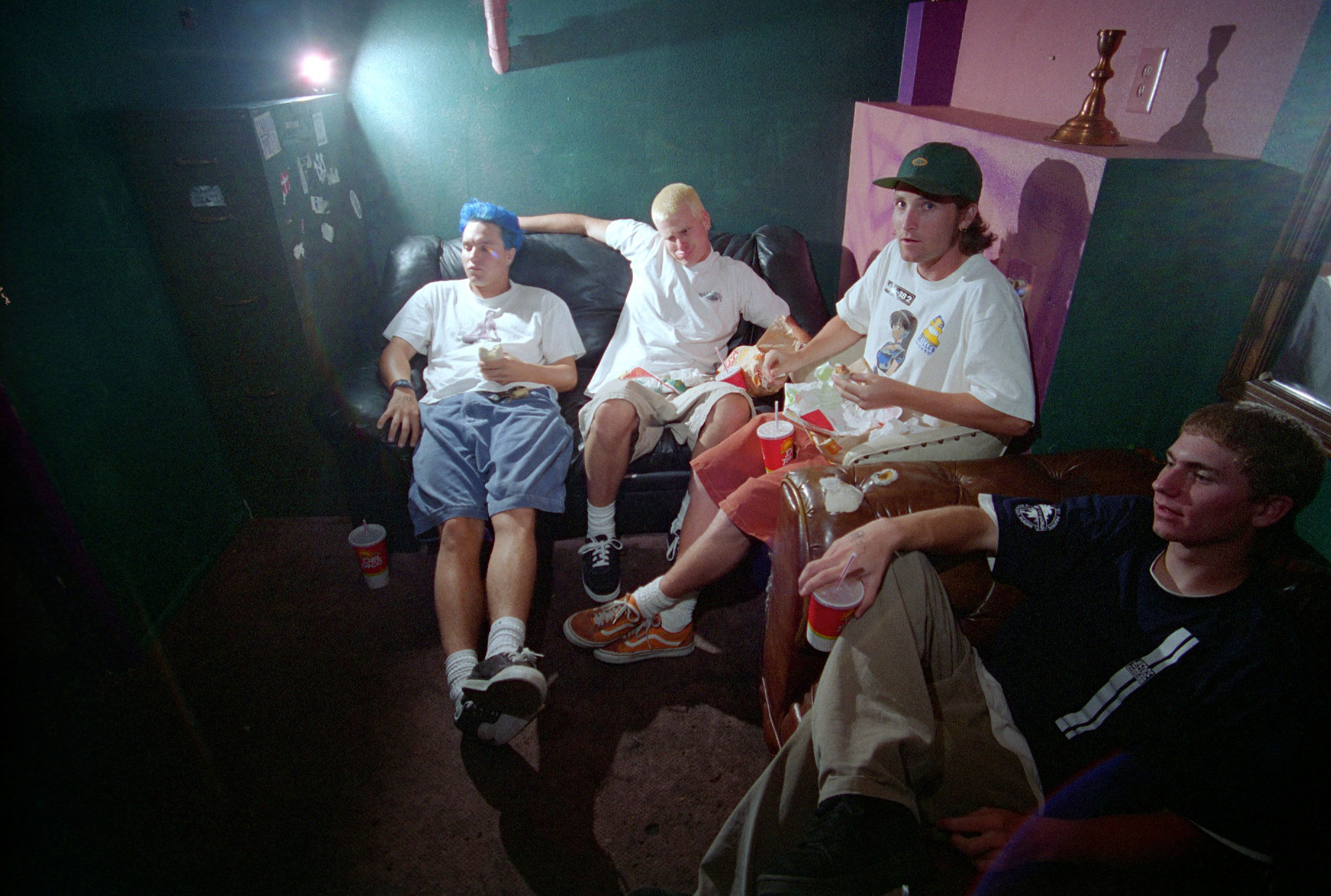
Blink-182

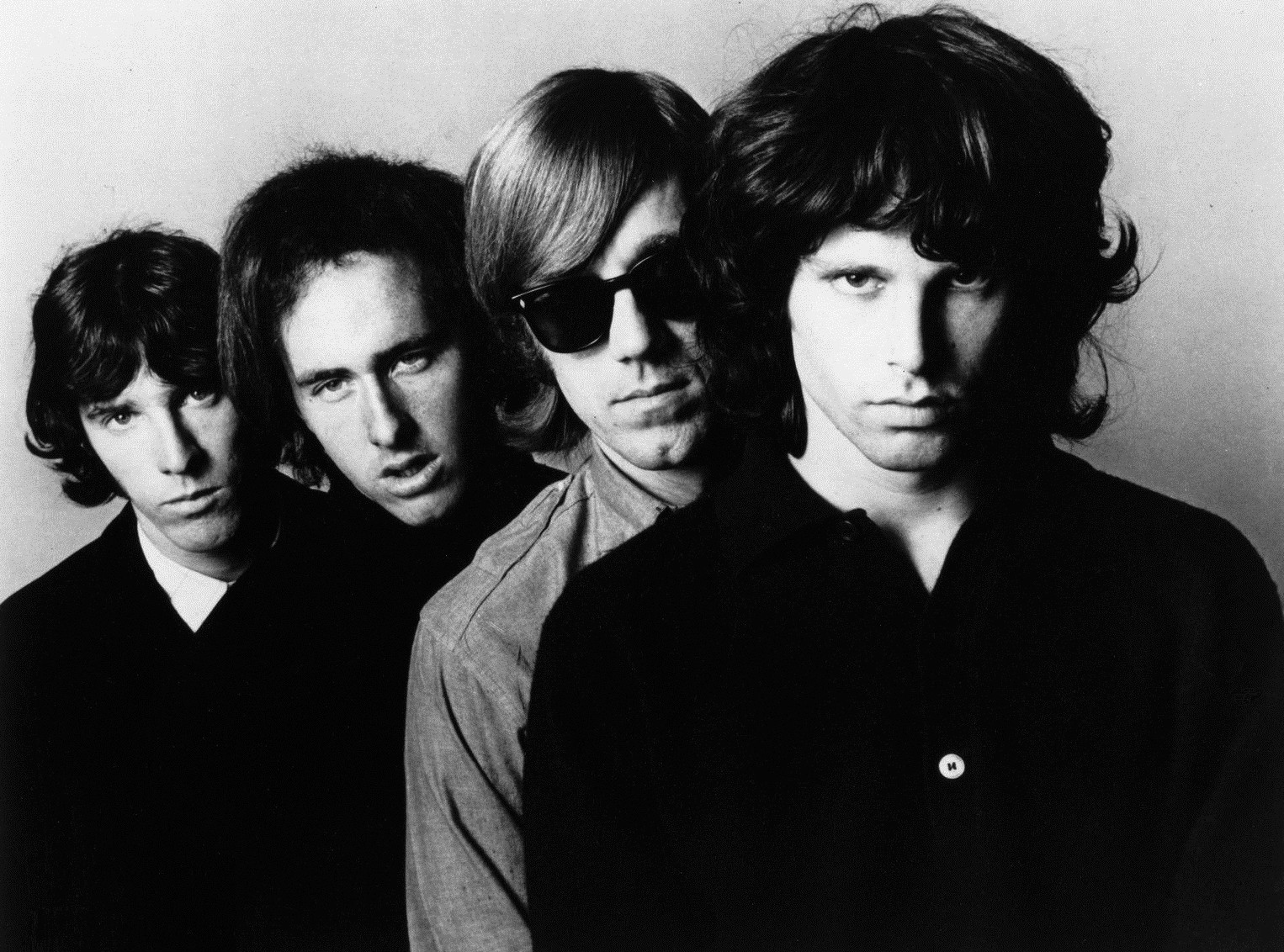
The Doors

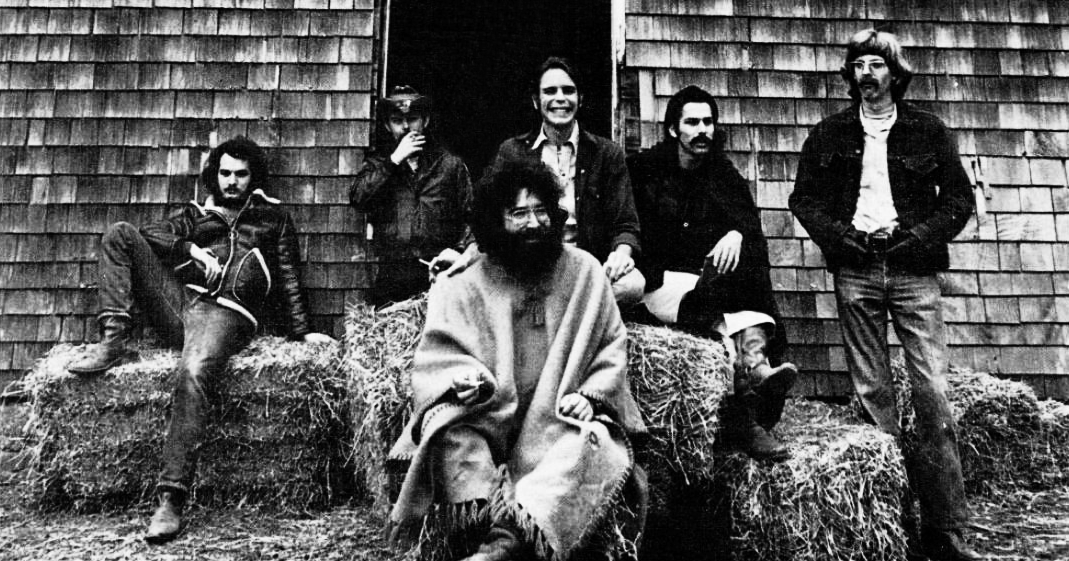
Grateful Dead

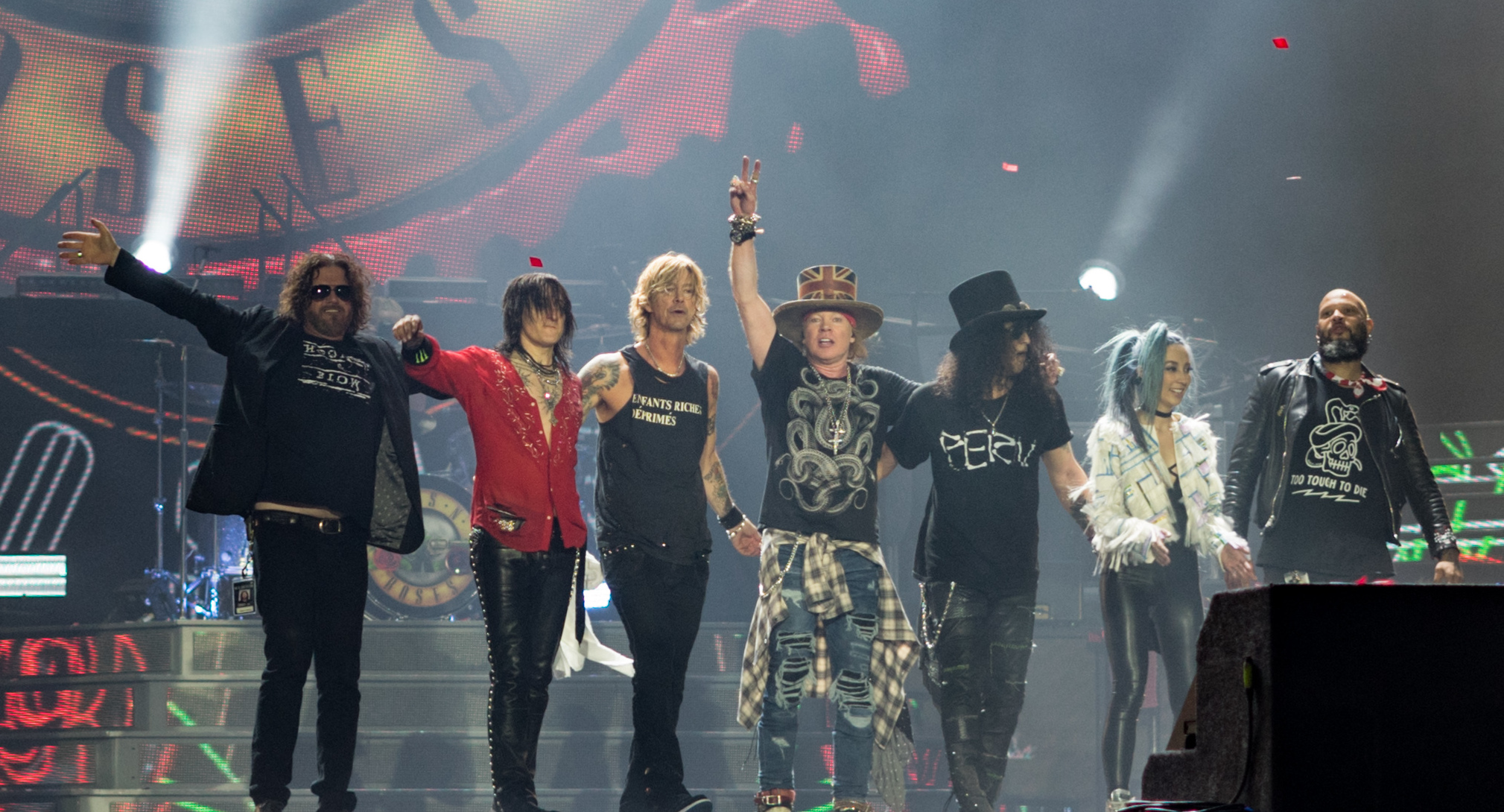
Guns N' Roses

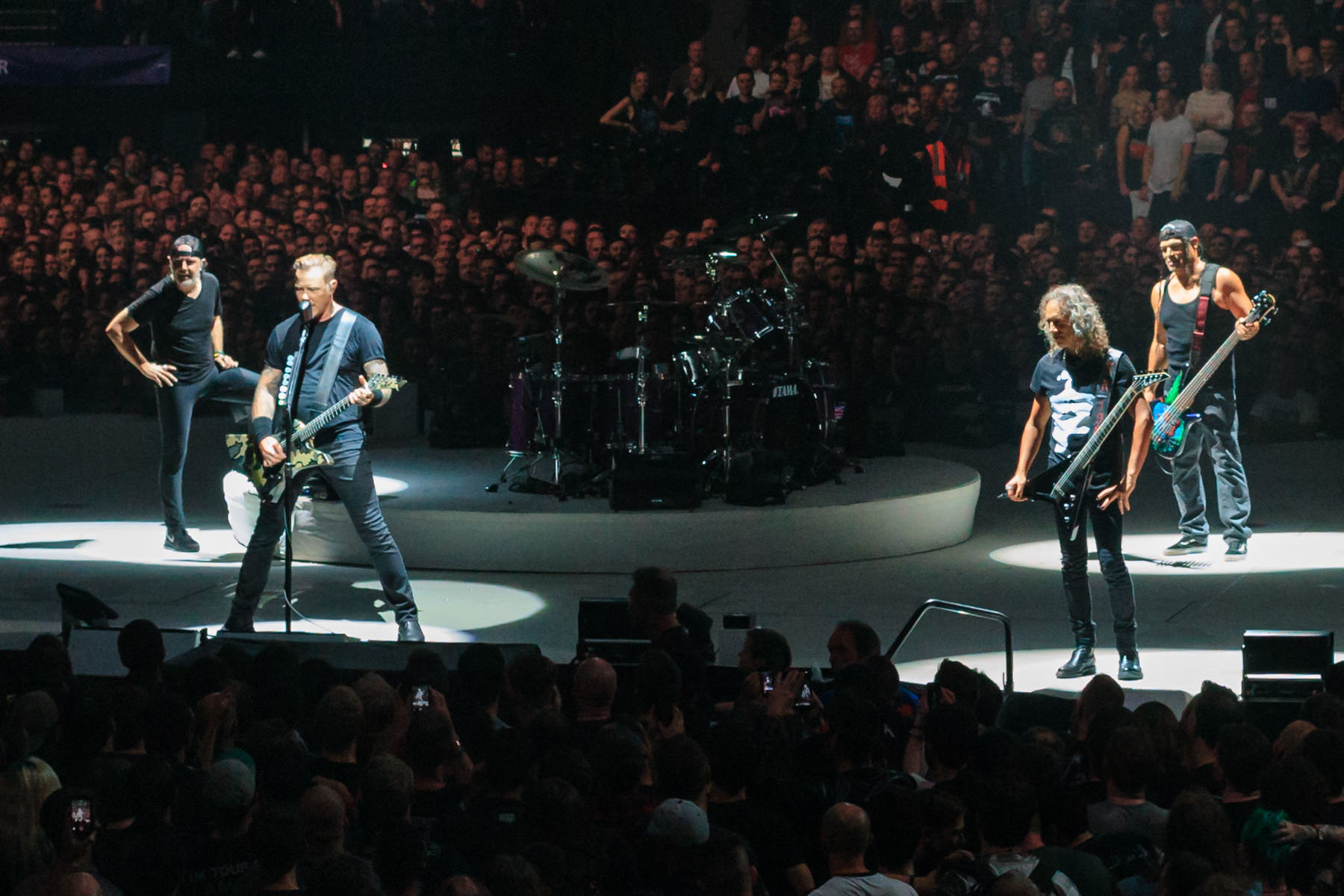
Metallica

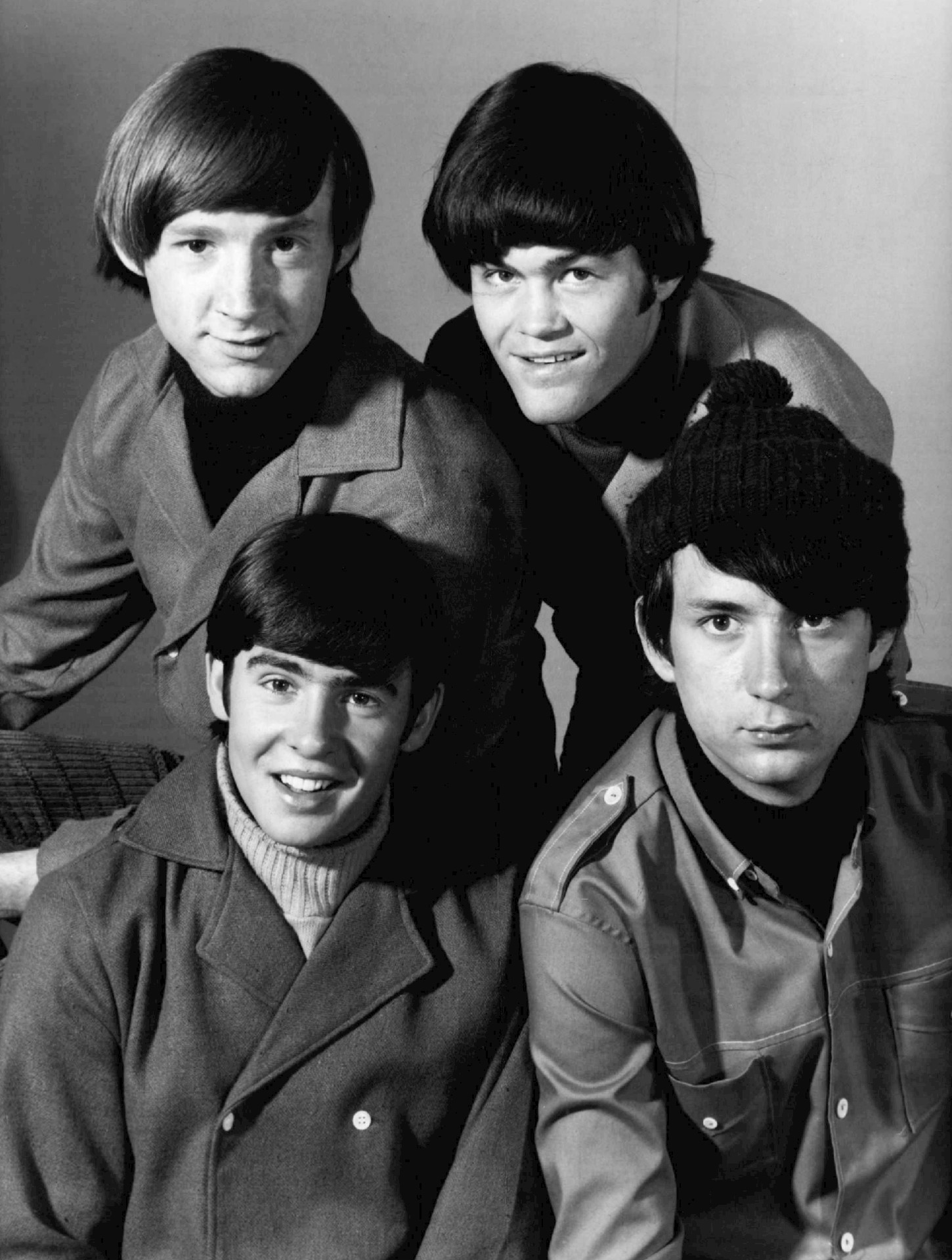
The Monkees

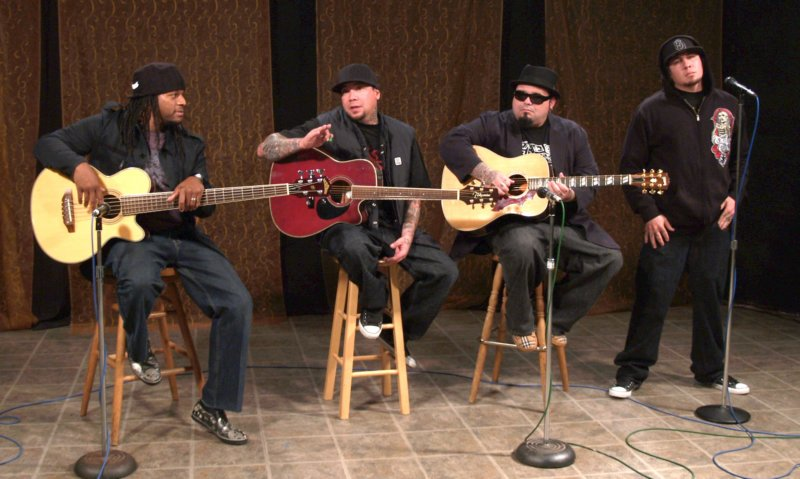
P.O.D.

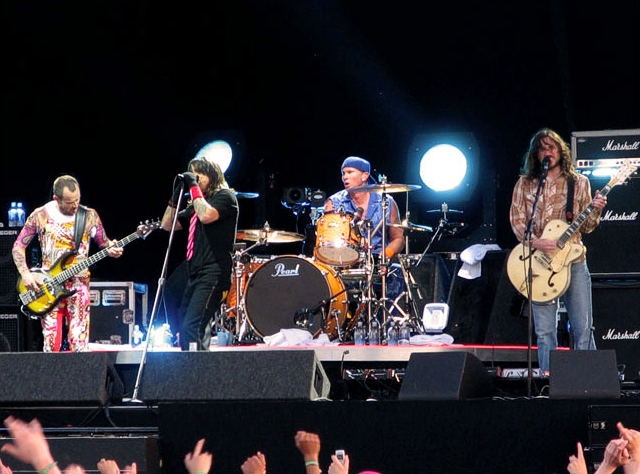
Red Hot Chili Peppers

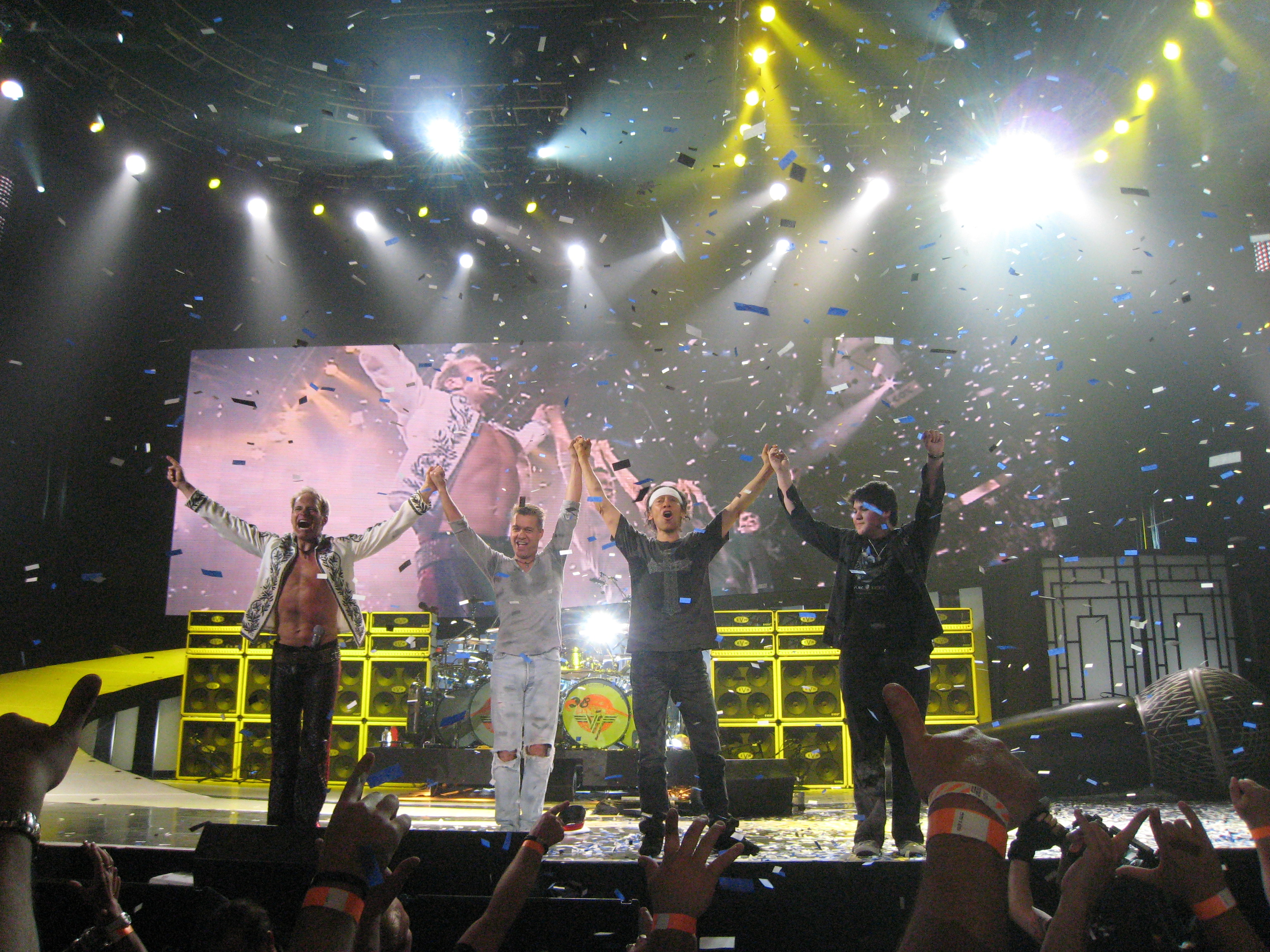
Van Halen

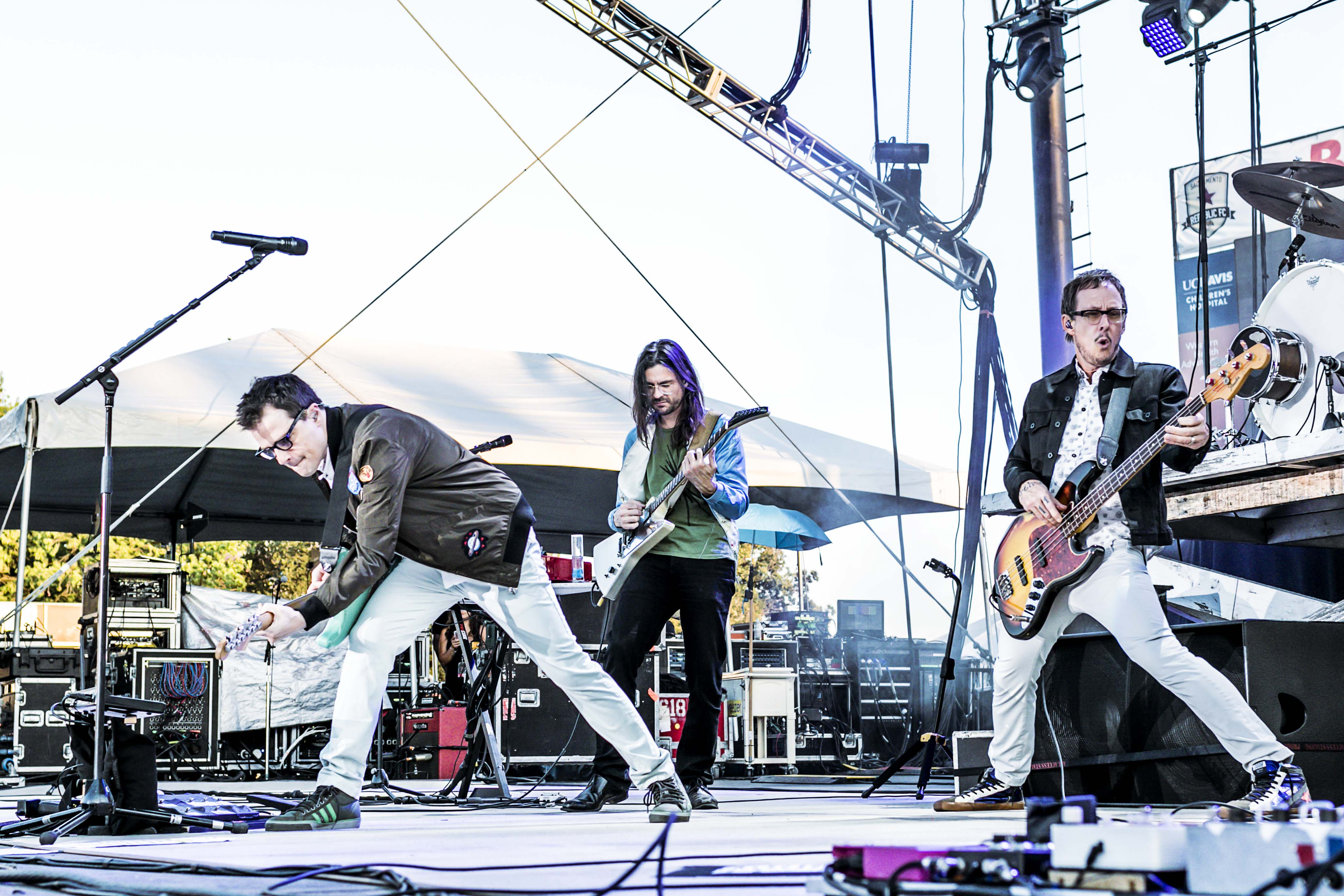
Weezer

- Adema – nu metal band
- AFI – rock band
- Alien Ant Farm – rock band
- As I Lay Dying – metal band
- Atreyu – metalcore band
- Audioslave – rock band
- Avenged Sevenfold – metal band
- Bad Religion – punk band
- The Bangles – pop band
- The Beach Boys – pop band
- The Bird and the Bee – indie duo
- Black Eyed Peas – pop/rap group
- Black Flag – hardcore band
- Blind Melon – psychedelic rock band
- Blink-182 – pop/punk band
- Body Count – rap/metal band
- The Byrds – folk rock band
- Circle Jerks – punk band
- Coal Chamber – nu metal band
- Concrete Blonde – alternative band
- Counting Crows – rock band
- Crazy Town – rap/rock band
- Creedence Clearwater Revival – rock band
- Cypress Hill – hip hop band
- Dead Kennedys – rock band
- Deftones – alternative metal band
- The Donnas – rock band
- The Doors – rock band
- The Eagles – rock band
- Eels – alternative band
- Faith No More – alternative band
- Far East Movement – hip hop band
- Fear Factory – metal band
- Fishbone – alternative band
- Flogging Molly – Celtic punk band
- Geraldine Fibbers – alternative band
- Germs – punk band
- The Go-Go's – pop band
- Grateful Dead – folk rock band
- Green Day – rock band
- Guns N' Roses – hard rock band
- Hed PE – rap/rock band
- Hollywood Undead – rap/metal band
- Hoobastank – rock band
- In Fear And Faith – metal band
- Incubus – rock band
- Jane's Addiction – alternative band
- Jefferson Airplane – rock band
- Journey – rock band
- Julien-K – synth band
- Korn – nu metal band
- Lifehouse – pop rock band
- Linkin Park – alternative rock band
- Lit – rock band
- Machine Head – heavy metal band
- Mad at the World – Christian rock band
- Maroon 5 – rock band
- Megadeth – metal band
- Metallica – metal band
- Minutemen – punk band
- The Monkees – pop band
- Mötley Crüe – hard rock band
- Mr. Bungle – experimental rock band
- N.W.A – hip hop group
- No Doubt – ska-punk band
- The O.C. Supertones – ska band
- Of Mice & Men – metalcore band
- The Offspring – rock band
- Oingo Boingo – new wave band
- Orgy – synth
- Otep – heavy metal band
- P.O.D. – rock band
- Papa Roach – rap/metal band
- Prophets of Rage – rap/metal band
- Queens of the Stone Age – rock band
- Rage Against the Machine – rap/metal band
- Ratt – hard rock band
- Red Hot Chili Peppers – rock band
- Sixx:A.M. – rock band
- Slayer – metal band
- Smile Empty Soul – post-grunge band
- Snot – rock band
- Social Distortion – punk band
- Spineshank – metal band
- Static-X – industrial metal band
- Stone Temple Pilots – hard rock band
- Sublime – ska-punk and dub band
- Suicidal Tendencies – punk/metal band
- Suicide Silence – metal band
- Switchfoot – rock band
- System of a Down – metal band
- Tesla – hard rock band
- Third Eye Blind – rock band
- Thrice – rock band
- Tool – progressive metal band
- Trapt – rock band
- Van Halen – hard rock band
- Velvet Revolver – hard rock band
- The Wallflowers – rock band
- Weezer – alternative rock band
- X – alternative/punk band

== California transplants ==
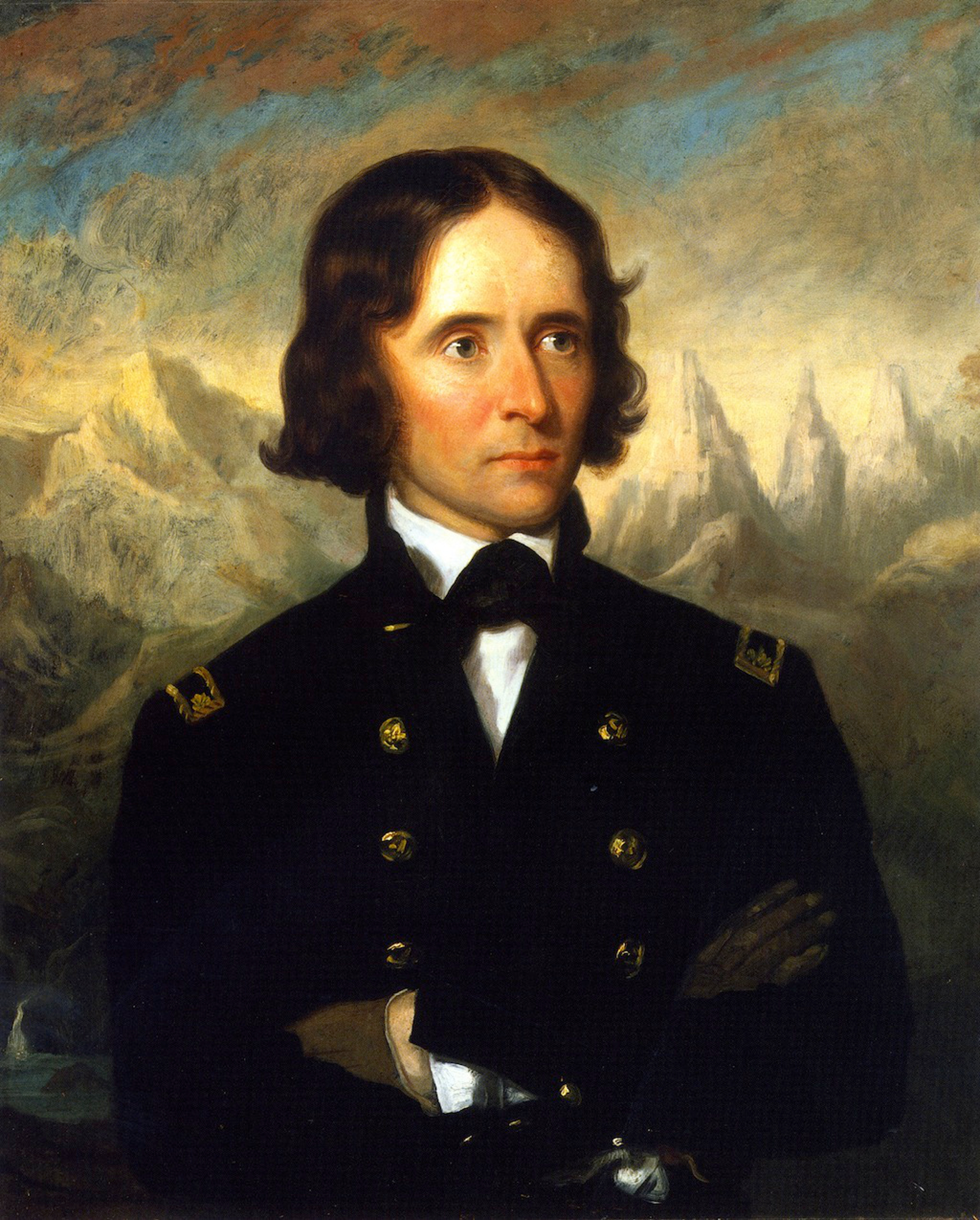
John C. Fremont

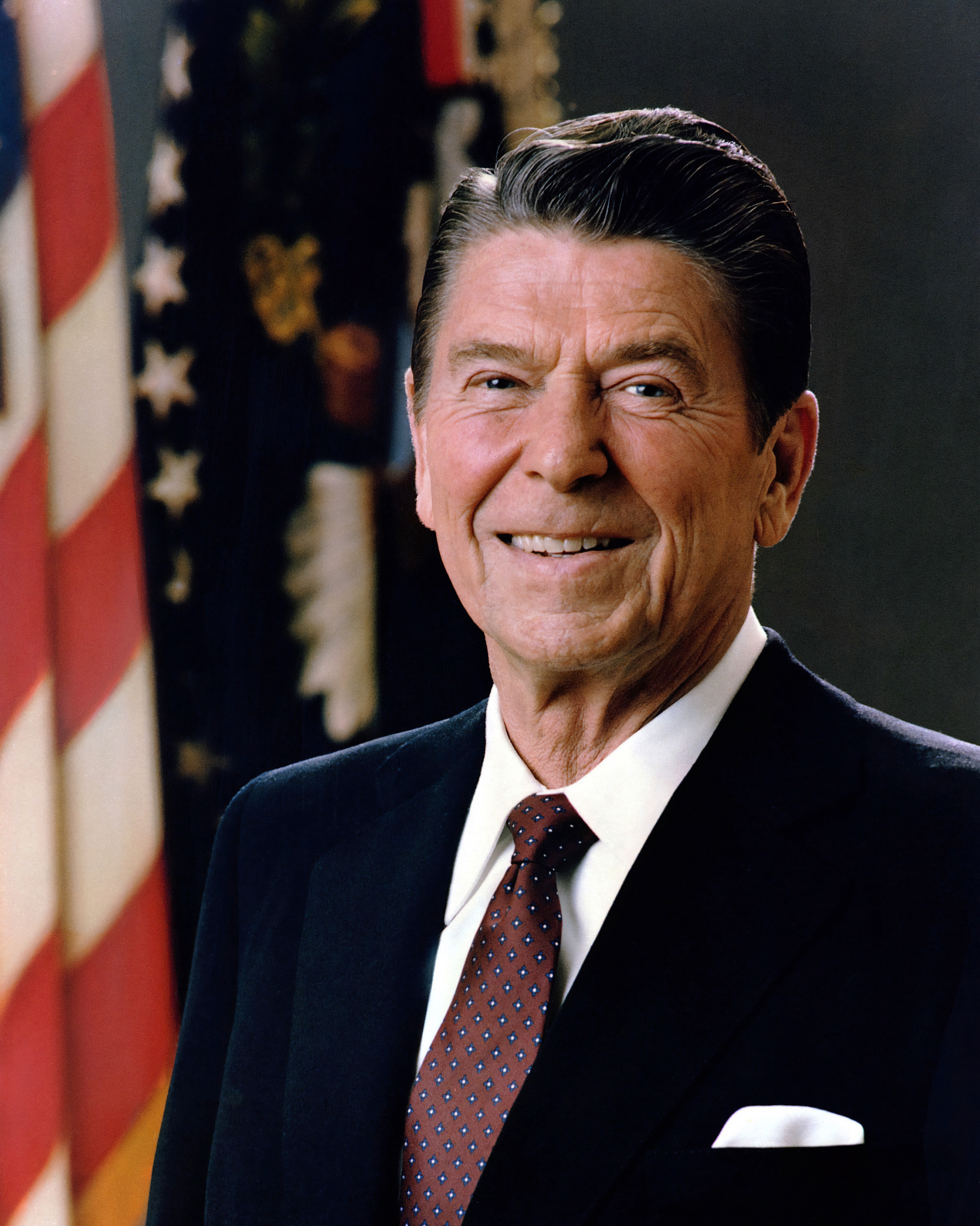
Ronald Reagan

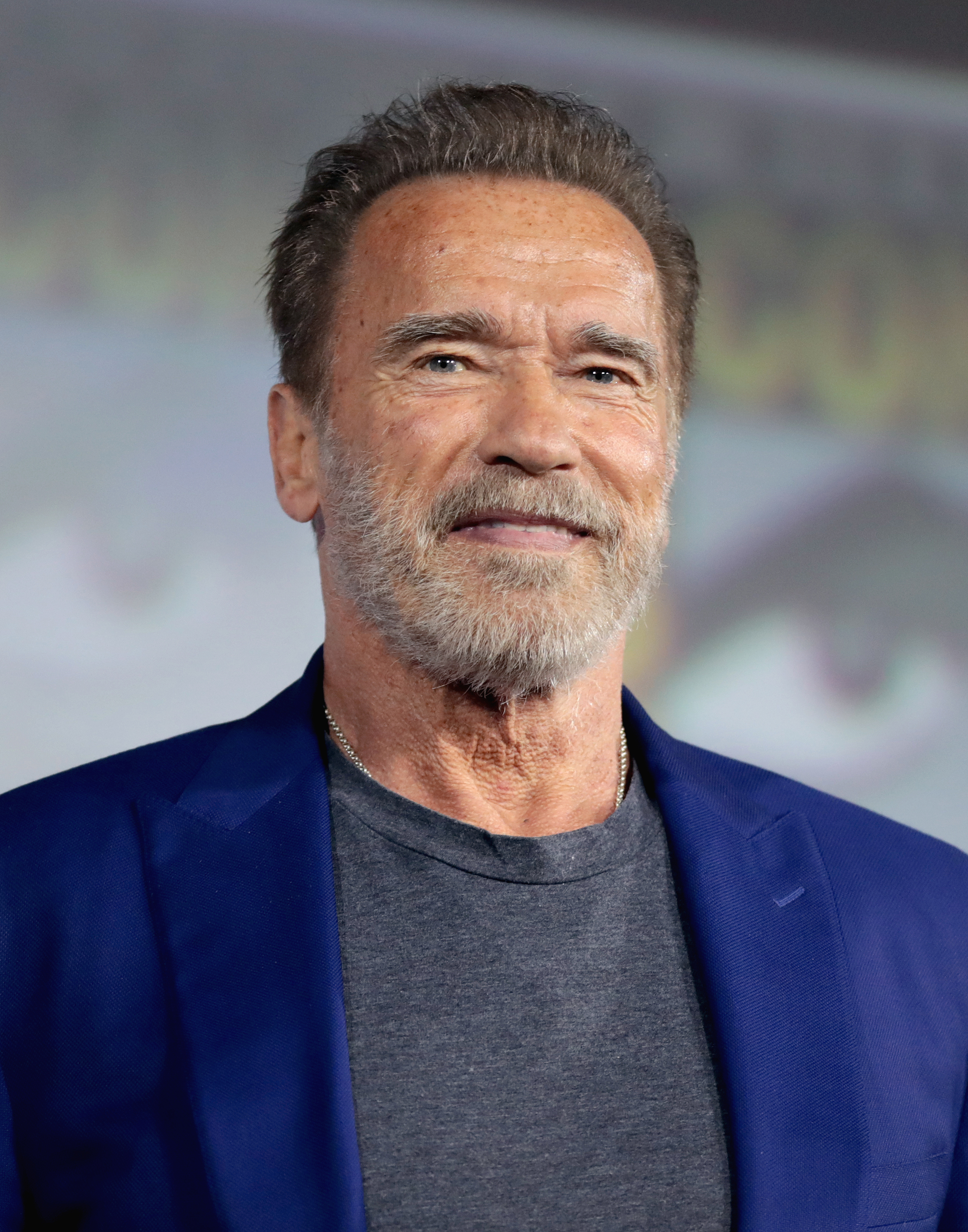
Arnold Schwarzenegger

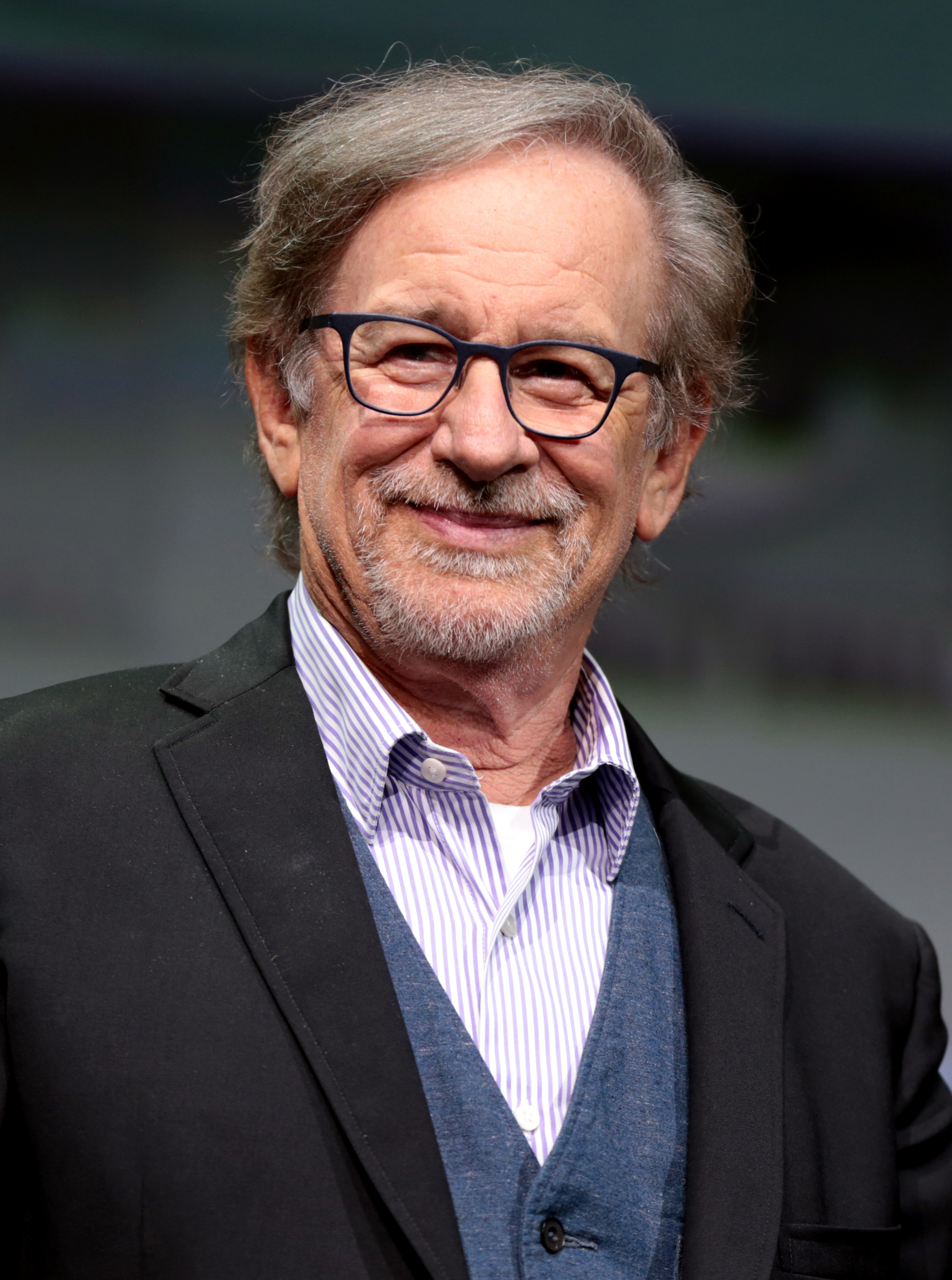
Steven Spielberg

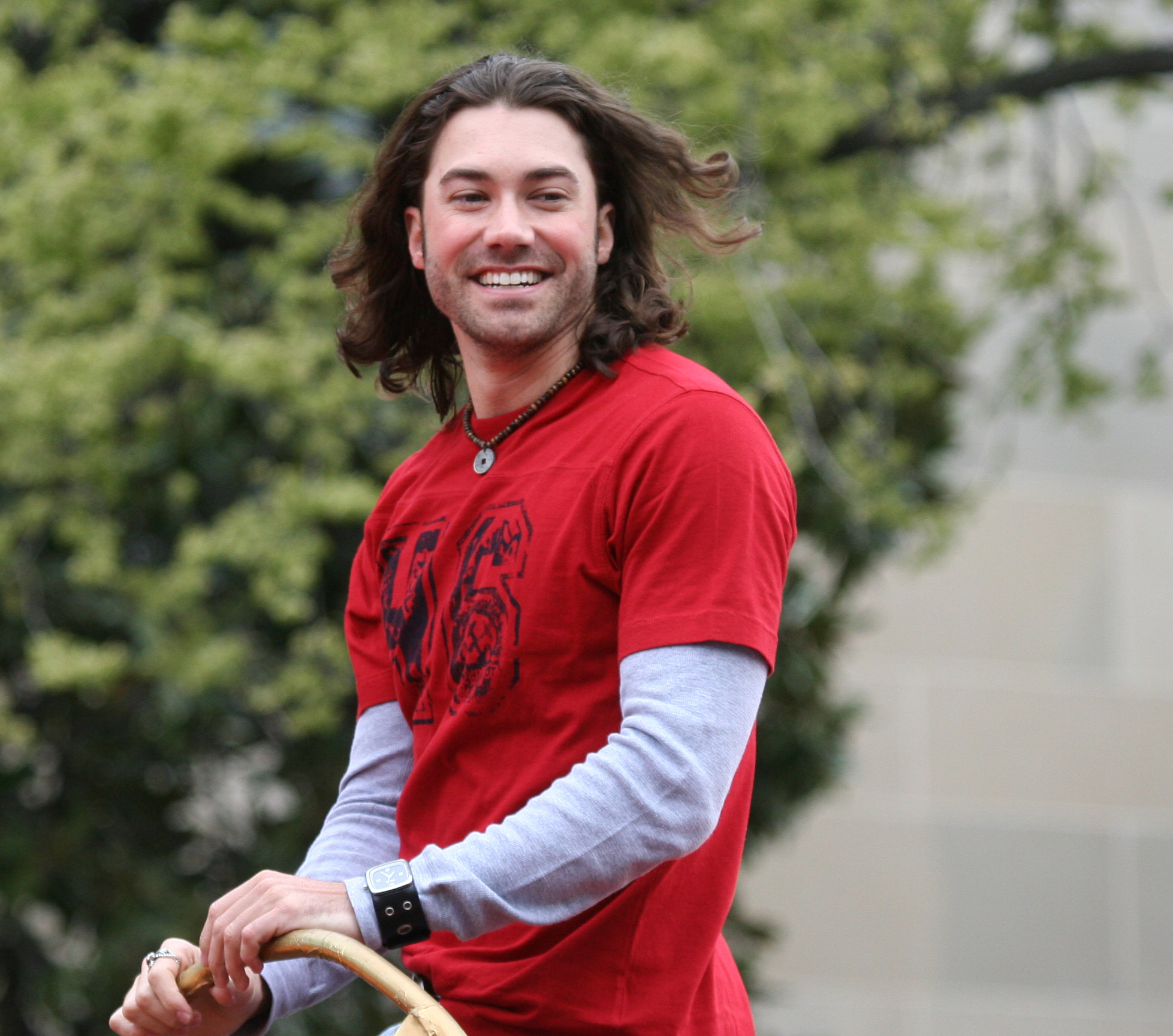
Ace Young

- Samuel Brannan – newspaper publisher
- Juan Rodríguez Cabrillo – Spanish explorer
- César Chávez – labor leader
- Juan Bautista de Anza – Spanish explorer
- Gaspar de Portolà – Spanish explorer
- Larry Ellison – co-founder of Oracle Corporation
- John C. Frémont – explorer, military officer, U.S. senator from California
- Domingo Ghirardelli – chocolatier (Ghirardelli Chocolate Company)
- Chick Hearn – National Basketball Association announcer for the Los Angeles Lakers
- William Redington Hewlett – co-founder of Hewlett-Packard
- Bob Hope – actor, singer, and comedian
- Steve Jurvetson – venture capitalist (a managing director of Draper Fisher Jurvetson)
- James Lick – real estate baron
- Steve Martin – actor, author, comedian, and director
- Johnny Mathis – singer ("Chances Are")
- Fritz Maytag – former owner of Anchor Brewing Company in San Francisco; chairman of the board of the Maytag Dairy Farms
- Thomas Mesereau – criminal defense lawyer
- Joe Montana – National Football League quarterback
- Joe Morgan – baseball player
- John Muir – naturalist
- Joshua A. Norton – British self-proclaimed "Emperor of the United States and Protector of Mexico"
- Buck Owens – country music performer
- Ronald Reagan – actor and 40th president of the United States
- Carlos Santana – Mexican musician
- Michael Savage – author, political commentator, radio host
- Charles M. Schulz – cartoonist
- Arnold Schwarzenegger – governor of California, actor, and bodybuilder
- Vin Scully – announcer for Major League Baseball's Los Angeles Dodgers
- Glenn T. Seaborg – chemist
- Junipero Serra – Spanish missionary
- Steven Spielberg – director
- Leland Stanford – railroad baron, governor of California, and founder of Stanford University
- Ken Starr – lawyer and university law dean
- Levi Strauss – Bavarian clothing manufacturer
- John Sutter – Swiss real estate baron
- Mark Twain – humorist and author
- Lars Ulrich – musician (Metallica)
- Sarah Winchester – heiress, eccentric and builder of the Winchester Mystery House
- Charles Wood – musical theatre performer (original Hortensio in Cole Porter's 1948 Broadway musical Kiss Me, Kate)
- Chuck Yeager – United States Air Force test pilot
- Ace Young – singer
- Steve Young – National Football League quarterback

== See also ==
- List of California suffragists
- List of people from Chula Vista, California
- List of people from Long Beach, California
- List of people from Los Angeles
- List of people from Malibu, California
- List of people from Orange County, California
- List of people from Palm Springs, California
- List of people from Sacramento, California
- List of people from San Diego
- List of people from San Francisco
