= Austin Coleman =

American professional BMX rider

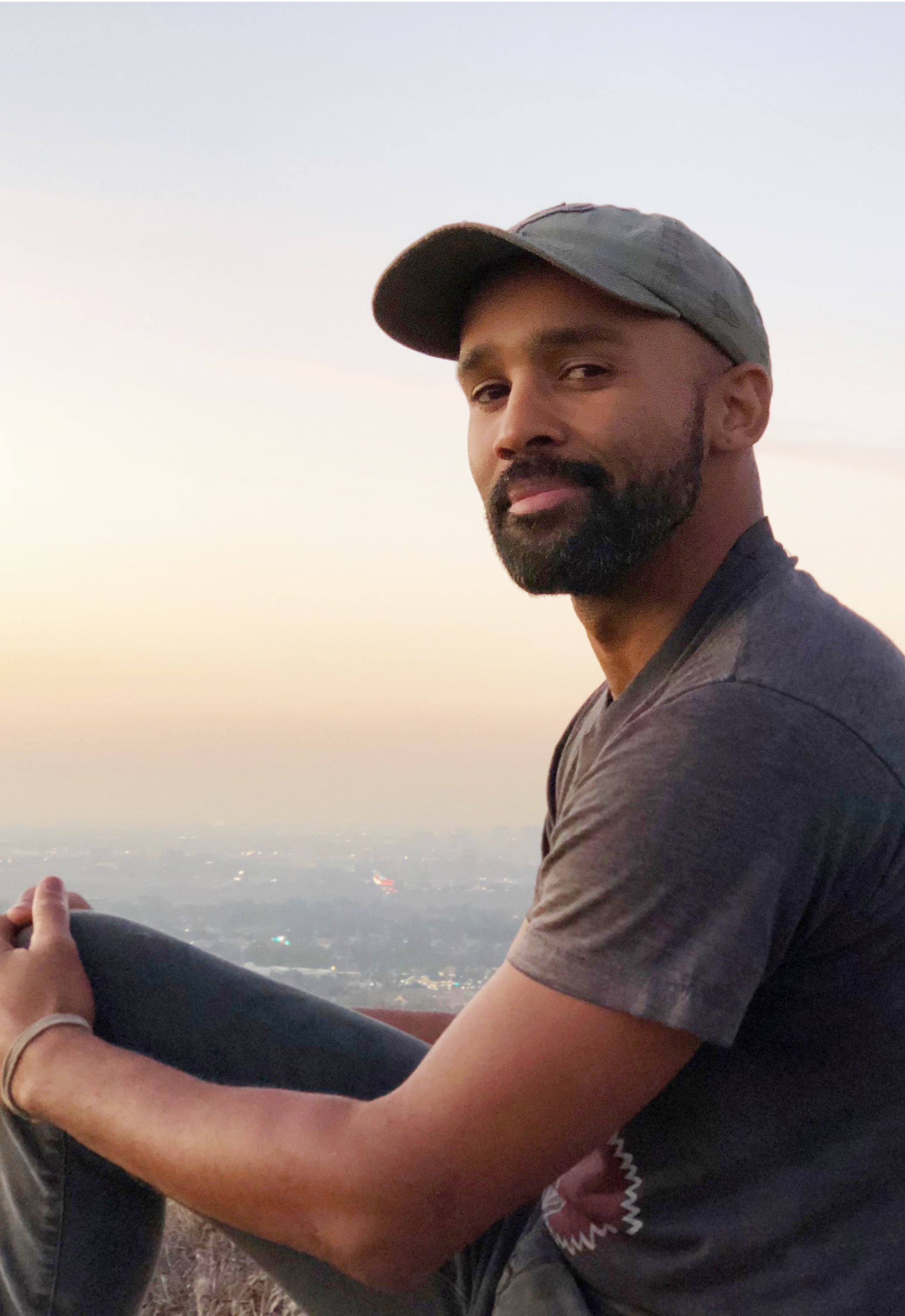

Personal information
- Full name: Austin Daniel Coleman
- Born: 1983 (age 42–43) Los Angeles, California, U.S.
- Height: 6 ft 0 in (1.83 m)
- Weight: 165 lb (75 kg)

Sport
- Country: United States
- Sport: BMX Riding
- Turned pro: 2000

Austin Daniel Coleman (born 1983) is an American professional BMX rider and reality television personality, the co-host (along with his partner Raisa Kuddus), on the HGTV series First Home Fix.

== Personal life ==
Austin Coleman was born in Los Angeles, CA to Freddie and Jeanette Coleman. Austin was involved in sports as a child and began skateboarding at the age of 10 until he got his older brother's BMX bike.

Although his first year as a professional came senior year of high school, an avid student, Austin continued his academic and professional athletic careers simultaneously attending the University of Southern California on Academic Scholarship and graduating May 2006, with a degree in Urban Planning and Development.

In 2021, Austin co-hosts Fresh Starter, where he and his partner Raisa Kuddus help create custom renovations using only what their young clients have to offer—awkward spaces and tight budgets.

== Style ==
Coleman strives for diversity in his riding, which has led him into several different disciplines throughout his riding career, the most recent being Vert. He brought his style to the halfpipe, floating downside whips.

== Competitions ==
- X Games Asia 2010 Vert Bronze Medalist
- X Games Asia 2010 Mini Mega Bronze Medalist
- T-Mobile Extreme Playgrounds 2010 Bronze Medal
- Dew Tour 2008 Park Bronze Medalist
- Action Sports World Tour 2008 Silver Medalist
