= Abby Wilde =

American actress

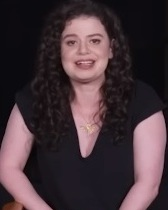
- Wilde in 2023
- Born: Abigail Miriam Dauermann; San Francisco, California, U.S.
- Occupations: Actress; singer
- Years active: 2005–present
- Known for: Stacey Dillsen in Zoey 101 (2005)

Abigail Miriam Dauermann, known professionally by her stage name Abby Wilde, is an American actress and singer best known for portraying Stacey Dillsen in Zoey 101, iCarly, and Sam & Cat.

== Early life ==
Abby Wilde was born Abigail Miriam Dauermann to Messianic Jewish parents in San Francisco, California. She began acting at the age of 12, when she took a class with her brothers at the local YMCA branch. Since then, she has appeared in a variety of plays, Shakespeare performances, opera concerts, one-act play festivals, and musicals, both in New York City and Los Angeles.

== Career ==
In 2006, Wilde was cast in a recurring role as Stacey Dillsen on Nickelodeon's hit television show Zoey 101. Although her character was originally supposed to appear in only one episode, Wilde made such an impression that she became a frequent guest on the program. Wilde appeared in the show for 31 episodes between 2006 and 2008. In addition, Wilde starred in several made-for-television Zoey 101 films; "Zoey 101: The Curse of PCA" (2007), "Zoey 101: Goodbye Zoey?" (2008), and the show's final episode "Zoey 101: Chasing Zoey" (2008).

In 2009, Wilde starred alongside Baywatch actor Alexandra Paul in her first full-length feature film, Family of Four, a drama written and directed by John Suits. Wilde reprised her role as Stacey in two other television shows: iCarly (2009–2011) and Sam & Cat (2013).

In 2019, Wilde joined fellow Zoey 101 castmates for an impromptu reunion, leading to speculation about a reboot of the series. On January 12, 2023, Jamie Lynn Spears announced that production had begun on a sequel film, titled Zoey 102, set to premiere in 2023 on Paramount+, with original series cast members Spears, Wilde, Sean Flynn, Christopher Massey, Erin Sanders, Matthew Underwood, and Jack Salvatore Jr. reprising their roles from Zoey 101. Production began in January 2023 in North Carolina, with Nancy Hower hired to direct and Spears as executive producer. The film was released on July 27, 2023 on Paramount+.

=== Theatre ===
Wilde has been an active member of the theatre community, both in New York City and the Greater Los Angeles Area. In Los Angeles, she was a part of Antaeus Theatre Company, which is a cooperative theatre ensemble composed of classically trained and highly accomplished professional actors, directors, designers, and other theatre artists dedicated to bringing classical theatre to Los Angeles. Since Antaeus works primarily with film actors who also wish to work in theatre, most plays are double cast, so that actors can fulfill their film requirements and make performances. With Antaeus, Wilde performed many roles, including Emilia from The Malcontent. Other roles include Uta Hagen in Ten Chimneys (Artists Repertory Theatre), Viola in Twelfth Night, Juliet in Juliet and Her Romeo (VanguardRep), Doris Shattock in Peace in Our Time, Richard, Duke of Gloucester in Richard III (Pipeline Players) and with Antaeus, Nina in The Seagull (The Antaeus Company) and Helen in The Cripple of Inishmaan.

==== Shakespeare and New Verse Plays ====
As well as performing Shakespeare's plays, Wilde has also been involved in several Shakespeare-adjacent plays by new verse dramatists. A few highlights include Shakespeare's "King Phycus" by Tom Willmorth at Antaeus, which imagines a newly discovered "bad quarto" of a Shakespeare play in rhyming couplets. The storyline combines several of Shakespeare's works, including King Lear, Hamlet, Richard III, Romeo and Juliet and Julius Caesar into a new ‘found’ play that is full of wordplay, double entendres and stage combat.

In New York City, Wilde worked with Shrunken Shakespeare company on IRA in 2015. Wilde also worked closely on a variety of new verse plays with Turn to Flesh Productions (TTF), which develops new plays in heightened text with vibrant roles for women and those underrepresented in classical art. With TTF, Wilde originated several roles with Artistic Director and playwright, Emily C. A. Snyder, including the leading roles of Glorielle of Syracuse in A Comedy of Heirors, or The Imposters, Princess Genevieve in The Other, Other Woman, and acting opposite Snyder as Margaret Ford in The Merry Widows of Windsor at the Sheen Center. Wilde also played the role of Psyche from Snyder's Cupid and Psyche several times, as well as taking on new roles by other verse playwrights.

=== Podcasts ===
From 2015 to 2016, Wilde was a co-host on the Shakespeare-inspired podcast, Pith and Moment. AS of 2019, she was working on the development of several other podcasts and audio dramas which have not yet been released.

== Filmography ==
Film
Year	Title	Role	Notes
2009	Family of Four	Kimberly Baker	
2017	Maturing Youth	Little Sally / Mr. Monkey / Mrs. Frog / Various	Voice; also narrator
2023	Zoey 102	Stacey Dillsen	Paramount+ film

Television
Year	Title	Role	Notes
2006–2008	Zoey 101	Stacey Dillsen	Recurring; 28 episodes
2009–2011	iCarly	Stacey Dillsen	2 episodes
2013	Sam & Cat	Stacey Dillsen	Episode: "#MadAboutShoe"
