= Matthew Underwood =

Matthew Underwood may refer to:

- Matt Underwood, American sportscaster
- Matthew Underwood (actor), American actor (born 1990)
