= Nancy Hower =

American actress (born 1966)

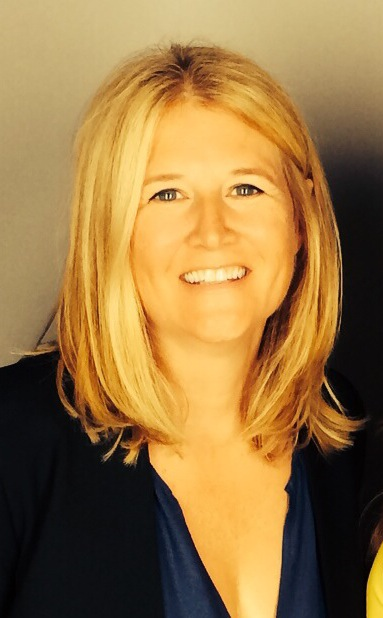
- Hower in 2014
- Born: May 11, 1966 (age 60); Wyckoff, New Jersey, U.S.
- Education: Juilliard School (BFA)
- Occupations: Actress, director, screenwriter, producer
- Years active: 1993–present

Nancy Hower is an American actress, director, screenwriter and producer.

== Early life ==
Nancy Hower grew up in Wyckoff, New Jersey, and is one of nine children. She appeared onstage for the first time as a senior in high school. Upon graduating from high school, Hower continued her studies at the Juilliard School in New York City where she majored in drama. During her years at Juilliard, she appeared in such productions as King Lear, And A Nightingale Sang, Macbeth, The Fifth of July, and The Would-Be Gentleman. She also later appeared in two stage productions at the Williamstown Theatre Festival in Massachusetts.

== Career ==
Hower began her professional acting career playing the role of Andrea in The Years at the Manhattan Theatre Club in 1993. She has also been in several on and off-Broadway stage productions throughout her career. In 1994, she made her film debut with a supporting role in the comedy film Insomnia. In 1998, she appeared in the airline disaster film Blackout Effect. Other film work includes a role in the short independent film Tunnel Vision (1998) and an FBI agent in the sci-fi movie The Last Man on Planet Earth (1999). Hower also had a role in Standing On Fishes (1999), and although her name appears in the end credits of this movie, her role was cut from the final version. She has had guest-starring roles in the television series Suddenly Susan and The Sentinel.

=== Star Trek: Voyager ===
Hower had a recurring role as Ensign Samantha Wildman on the sci-fi series Star Trek: Voyager. She appeared in eight episodes of the series' seven-year run. Her character is head of Voyager's xenobiology department and, in the episode "Deadlock" (Season 2), she gives birth to a daughter called Naomi Wildman.

Hower's Voyager appearances are, in chronological order: "Elogium" (Season 2), "Tattoo" (Season 2), "Dreadnought" (Season 2), "Deadlock" (Season 2), "Basics, Pt. 2" (Season 3), "Mortal Coil" (Season 4), "Once Upon A Time" (Season 5), and "Fury" (Season 6).

Wildman was also mentioned, but not seen, in several other Voyager episodes.

=== Music ===
Hower formerly fronted two alternative rock bands, WENCH and STELLA. STELLA was the opening act on Meat Loaf's 2001 UK tour. She sang lead, played rhythm guitar, and wrote all of the band's music.

Hower also co-wrote the original music for the play Momma in 2001, as well as writing and recording an unreleased rock opera titled Girl On Mars. Also in 2001, she played the role of Yitzak in Hedwig and the Angry Inch in Los Angeles.

=== 2003–present ===
Hower wrote and directed the short film The Wizard of Id, an unreleased film about a musician who discovers that he has the power to change the lives of the people around him through his music. In 2003, Hower directed the stage play City Limits at the Keck Theater in Los Angeles.

Hower wrote, directed, produced and edited the independent film Memron (2004), a mockumentary on the Enron scandal. In 2004, she also directed the stage play The Lights Change at the Keck Theatre.

Following the success of Memron, Hower teamed up with fellow Memron producers Robert Hickey, John Lehr, and Evie Peck to create a comedy improv series titled 10 Items or Less. The TBS show stars John Lehr as a less than successful businessman who takes over the family supermarket when his father dies. 10 Items or Less premiered on TBS on November 27, 2006.

Hower provided vocals for the film Catch and Release (2007), in which she also plays a small role.

In 2013, Hower directed and co-wrote the Hulu original series Quickdraw, which was renewed for a second season in 2014.

On January 12, 2023, Jamie Lynn Spears announced that production had begun on a sequel film entitled, Zoey 102, set to premiere in 2023 on Paramount+, with original series cast members Spears, Sean Flynn, Christopher Massey, Erin Sanders, Matthew Underwood, Jack Salvatore, Jr., and Abby Wilde reprising their roles. Production began in January 2023 in North Carolina. Hower directed, with Spears attached as executive producer.

The film was released on July 27, 2023, on Paramount+.
