= Jack Salvatore Jr. =

American actor (born 1989)

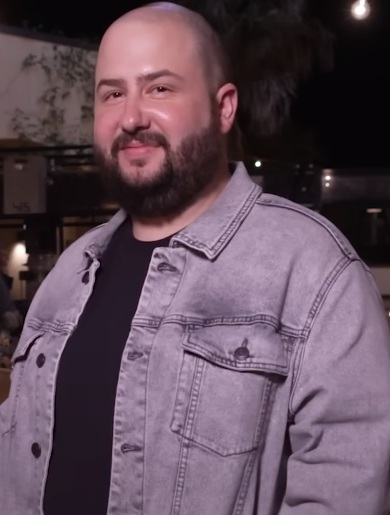
- Salvatore in 2023
- Born: October 16, 1989 (age 37); Los Angeles, California, U.S.
- Occupations: Actor, writer
- Years active: 1997–present
- Spouse: Christine Pemberton (m. 2021)
- Children: 1

Jack Salvatore Jr. (born October 16, 1989) is an American actor and television writer. He is best known for his role as Mark Del Figgalo on Zoey 101.

== Career ==
Salvatore appeared in the 2001 film Donnie Darko, and has guest starred in several television shows, including Judging Amy, That '70s Show, and Still Standing. He is known for his recurring role as Mark Del Figgalo in the Nickelodeon/Family television series Zoey 101, in which he appeared in 28 episodes. Salvatore appeared on How I Met Your Mother and had a small role in the Owen Wilson feature Drillbit Taylor.

In the alternate opening and the alternate ending to 13 Going on 30 (2004), Salvatore played young Matt Flamhaff. These alternate clips can be seen on the special features on the DVD. He appeared in an episode of Mind of Mencia and The Secret Life of the American Teenager, and had a recurring role on 10 Things I Hate About You. He also guest starred in the TV show Victorious as the pajelehoocho commercial boy in the episode 'Victori-Yes.' He also worked as the writer's production assistant on shows like Victorious and Sam & Cat.

On January 12, 2023, Jamie Lynn Spears announced that production had begun on a sequel film entitled, Zoey 102, set to premiere in 2023 on Paramount+, with original series cast members Spears, Salvatore Jr., Sean Flynn, Christopher Massey, Erin Sanders, and Matthew Underwood reprising their roles from Zoey 101. Production began in January 2023 in North Carolina. Nancy Hower is currently attached to direct, with Spears attached as executive producer. The film was released on July 27, 2023 on Paramount+.

== Filmography ==
=== Film ===
Year	Title	Role
2001	Donnie Darko	Larry Reisman
2008	Drillbit Taylor	Random Kid
2008	Archie's Final Project	Braniac #2
2009	Stay Cool	Student in the Hallway
2023	Zoey 102	Mark Del Figgalo

=== Television ===
Year	Title	Role	Notes
1997	Men Behaving Badly	Young Jamie	Episode: "No Retreat, No Surrender"
1997	Jenny	Kid	Episode: "A Girl's Gotta Deck The Halls"
1998	3rd Rock from the Sun	Roy	Episode: "When Aliens Camp"
1998	The Secret Diary of Desmond Pfeiffer	Young Abe Lincoln	Episode: "Saving Mr. Lincoln"
1998	Caroline in the City	Street Urchin	Episode: "Caroline and the Fright Before Christmas"
2000	Geppetto	Pleasure Island inhabitant	TV movie
2000	The Drew Carey Show	Scout #4	Episode: "Drew and the Trail Scouts"
2000	Two Guys, a Girl and a Pizza Place	Brat	Episode: "Rescue Me"
2001	The Weber Show	Kid in Wheelchair	Episode: "...And Then Jack Found Out"
2001	The Big House	Chris	TV movie
2002	For Your Love	Teenager	Episode: "The Missing Link
2003	Filmore!	Peter	Voice; episode: "Links in a Chain of Honor"
2003	That '70s Show	Kid	Episode: "The Acid Queen"
2003	Judging Amy	Isaac Rollins	Episode: "Sex and the Single Mother"
2004	Oliver Beene	Pat - Guitarist	Episode: "Oliver & the Otters"
2004	Still Standing	The Oracle	Episode: "Still Winning"
2005-2008	Zoey 101	Mark Del Figgalo	Recurring role; 25 episodes
2007	How I Met Your Mother	Drive Thru Attendant	Episode: "Arrivederci, Fiero"
2008	Mind of Mencia	White Kid	Episode #4.4
2009	The Secret Life of the American Teenager	Student #2	Episode: "Summertime"
2009-2010	10 Things I Hate About You	Brad/Bookie	Recurring role; 5 episodes
2013	Victorious	Man in Pajelehoocho Commercial	Episode: "Victori-Yes"

== Personal life ==
Salvatore Jr. began dating Christine Pemberton in 2015. They married in February 2021 after 6 years of dating.

In March 2024, Salvatore Jr. claimed that Dan Schneider once brought out a shotgun to jokingly intimidate a writer while working at his home in Southern California.
