= Lola Martinez =

Lola Martinez may refer to:

- Lola Martinez (broadcaster), CNN International weather anchor
- Lola Martinez (Zoey 101), fictional character on American TV show Zoey 101
