= Zoey 102 =

2023 film by Nancy Hower

- Official release poster
- Directed by: Nancy Hower
- Screenplay by: Monica Sherer; Madeline Whitby
- Based on: Zoey 101 by Dan Schneider
- Produced by: Shauna Phelan; Zack Olin
- Starring: Jamie Lynn Spears; Erin Sanders; Sean Flynn; Christopher Massey; Matthew Underwood; Abby Wilde; Jack Salvatore Jr.; Owen Thiele; Thomas Lennon; Dean Geyer; Katelynn Bennett
- Cinematography: Mathew Rudenberg
- Edited by: Ian Skalski
- Music by: Roger Neill
- Production company: Nickelodeon Movies
- Distributed by: Paramount+
- Release date: July 27, 2023
- Running time: 101 minutes
- Country: United States
- Language: English

Zoey 102 is a 2023 American romantic comedy film directed by Nancy Hower from a screenplay written by the writing team of Monica Sherer and Madeline Whitby. It is a sequel film to the Nickelodeon series Zoey 101 (2005–2008), and features many of its cast members reprising their roles, including Jamie Lynn Spears, Erin Sanders, Sean Flynn, Christopher Massey, Matthew Underwood, Abby Wilde, and Jack Salvatore Jr., with Owen Thiele, Thomas Lennon, Dean Geyer, and Katelynn Bennett joining the cast as new characters.

Nickelodeon announced a sequel film to Zoey 101 in January 2023, fourteen years after the series concluded its run on the network. Sherer and Whitby were hired to write the screenplay, and Hower was confirmed to be directing. Spears confirmed her return the same month, and also served as an executive producer of the film alongside Hower, Sherer, Whitby, and Alexis Fisher, while Nickelodeon live-action production heads Shauna Phelan and Zack Olin served as producers. Sanders, Flynn, Massey, Underwood, Wilde, and Salvatore Jr. were also confirmed to reprise their roles, while new cast members Thiele, Lennon, Geyer, and Bennett joined soon after.

Principal photography took place primarily in Wilmington, North Carolina. Roger Neill was hired to compose the film's incidental score.

Produced by Nickelodeon Movies, Zoey 102 was released on Paramount+ on July 27, 2023. It received mixed reviews from critics. The film was the third most watched on Paramount+ in the U.S. and the second most watched in Canada one day after its release.

== Plot ==
Zoey Brooks, now 32 years old and a struggling producer for a reality TV show called "LOVE: Fully Charged", is asked to be the maid of honor at the wedding of her best friend Quinn Pensky, now a successful inventor, to Logan Reese, which is on the same weekend as the season finale of Zoey's show. Zoey also has unresolved feelings for best man Chase Matthews, currently an elementary school teacher with whom she has not had any contact for 15 years since leaving him on a Hawaiian vacation after high school. Zoey devises an elaborate plan to fulfill both commitments, hiring Todd Schupert, an actor who auditioned for "LOVE: Fully Charged," to pose as her false boyfriend, successful surgeon Hugo Hemsworth.

At the pre-wedding party, Zoey reunites with her old friends before sneaking away to help Jordan B., one of the finalists on her show. She returns to find a distraught Quinn, who admits that she feels uncomfortable with the wedding's size and opulence. The group goes to a karaoke bar, where a confrontation ensues between Todd and Chase, the latter insisting that he is over Zoey and is happy in his new relationship. The next day, Todd looks after Jordan while Zoey attends the wedding rehearsal, but Jordan suffers a head injury that makes him forget his "LOVE" lines. On the wedding day, Zoey goes to pick up the rings, accompanied by Chase. They are distant at first, but start to connect after being pressured into kissing by the confused jewelers. Zoey apologizes to Chase for leaving him in Hawaii, and the two admit to still having feelings for each other, leading to a more genuine kiss.

Chase and Zoey return to the wedding just in time for the ceremony and the "LOVE" finale. Zoey juggles her maid of honor duties while simultaneously feeding lines to Jordan via her phone. While giving the welcome speech, Stacey Dillsen, who now hosts a popular murder podcast that she has created, receives a tip suggesting that Todd might be a serial killer whom she and her now-husband Mark Del Figgalo, also her field producer, have been searching for. Amidst all the confusion, Zoey accidentally gives Jordan the wrong lines, ruining the finale. She then confesses that Todd is an actor and not her real boyfriend. Quinn, upset with Zoey's dishonesty and Logan's superficial obsession with making the wedding into a spectacle, calls off the ceremony and leaves in tears, and a guilt-ridden Zoey is fired from the show.

On the beach, Chase tells Zoey that he and his girlfriend Danielle had actually broken up two weeks before the wedding, and she only accompanied him so he would not be alone. Zoey takes everyone back to the now-abandoned Pacific Coast Academy campus, which they fix up. Logan apologizes to Quinn and takes her to PCA, where the group has set up an informal wedding venue. After the ceremony, Zoey is notified by her boss that the finale turned out to be a great success and offers her a promotion, which she accepts with some conditions. While dancing, she and Chase profess their love to one another and kiss.

Sometime later, Todd puts a squirming bag into the trunk of his car, seemingly confirming Stacey and Mark's suspicions that he is the killer.

== Cast ==
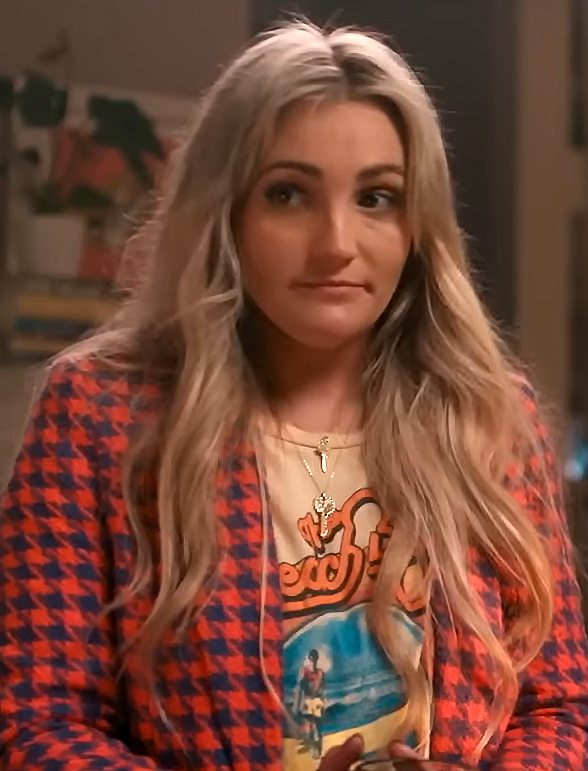
Jamie Lynn Spears in character as Zoey Brooks

- Jamie Lynn Spears as Zoey Brooks
- Sean Flynn as Chase Matthews
- Christopher Massey as Michael Barret
- Erin Sanders as Quinn Pensky
- Matthew Underwood as Logan Reese
- Abby Wilde as Stacey Dillsen
- Jack Salvatore Jr. as Mark Del Figgalo
- Dean Geyer as Todd Schupert
- Ms. Pat as Janice the Jeweler
- Thomas Lennon as Kelley Kevyn
- Owen Thiele as Archer March
- Katelynn Bennett as Camille
- Audrey Whitby as Lyric Reese
- Shua Jackson as Greg

Photographs of Victoria Justice and Austin Butler are used to represent their respective Zoey 101 characters: Lola Martinez and James Garrett. Spears' daughters Maddie and Ivey made cameo appearances in the film.

== Production ==
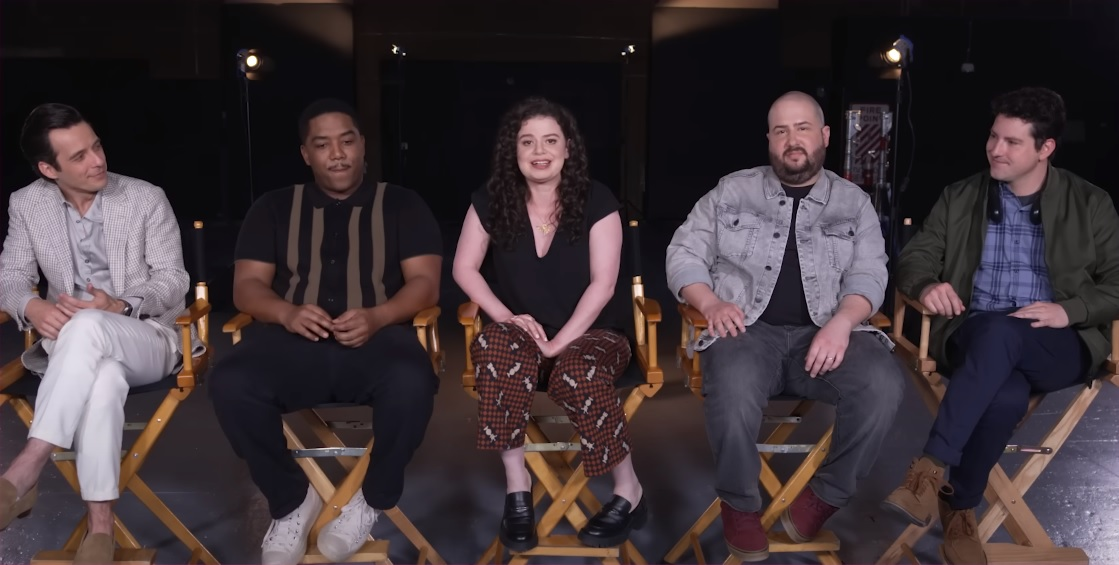
Zoey 102 cast members promoting the film

On January 12, 2023, it was announced that a revival film for Zoey 101 was under production by Paramount+, with Nancy Hower as director and a script written by Monica Sherer and Madeline Whitby. Spears posted a photo on Instagram and revealed that she would reprise her role as Zoey, along with most of the cast as well. In addition, it was announced that Spears would also serve as executive producer, along with Alexis Fisher, Hower, Sherer and Whitby, while Shauna Phelan and Zack Olin would be producers. In a statement, Spears said: "I'm beyond thrilled to be back alongside my PCA family and continue the story of Zoey and all the characters fans know and love. As an executive producer, it's been an exciting opportunity to work with such incredible talent as well as Paramount+ and Nickelodeon." However, several cast members did not return for the film. For example, Paul Butcher, the actor who played Dustin in the series, did not return as he was retired from acting and focusing on TikTok. Victoria Justice was offered the chance to reprise her role of Lola Martinez in the film, but she could not accept due to scheduling conflicts.

Principal photography took place in Wilmington, North Carolina, and some locations included the University of North Carolina Wilmington and Perry's Emporium with it wrapping in February 2023.

The first trailer was released on June 20, 2023, which announced that the film would premiere on July 27.

== Release ==
The film was released on July 27, 2023. After the film's release, the original series Zoey 101 was ranked on the Top 10 most watched television series list on Paramount+ in several countries.

== Reception ==
On review aggregator Rotten Tomatoes, it has an approval rating of 56% based on nine reviews, with an average rating of 4.8/10. Decider recommended streaming the film and wrote in a positive review: "Zoey 102 is a predictable reboot and the plot kinda goes exactly where you think it will. That being said, it's an enjoyable ride that reflects who these characters might be in 2023, and the jokes and writing feel funny and current." Brandon Yu of The New York Times wrote a favorable review: "It's not an easy task to make a movie out of a kids’ show from a bygone era, but the film does a relatively smooth job of dipping into — but not overdoing — the nostalgia and retaining the lighthearted, wacky tone that was the show's signature. It helps that the cast members, now older, are better performers. Even if there's a ceiling to how much can be achieved here, returning fans wanting a reminder of their youths will get just enough of what they came for."

On July 28, 2023, one day after the film's release, Zoey 102 was the third-most-watched film on Paramount+ in the United States and the second most watched in Canada.
