= Emily Snyder =

Emily Snyder may refer to:

- Emily Stewart, formerly Snyder, a character on the soap opera As the World Turns
- Emily C. A. Snyder (born 1977), American novelist, playwright and director
