= Christopher Massey =

American actor (born 1989)

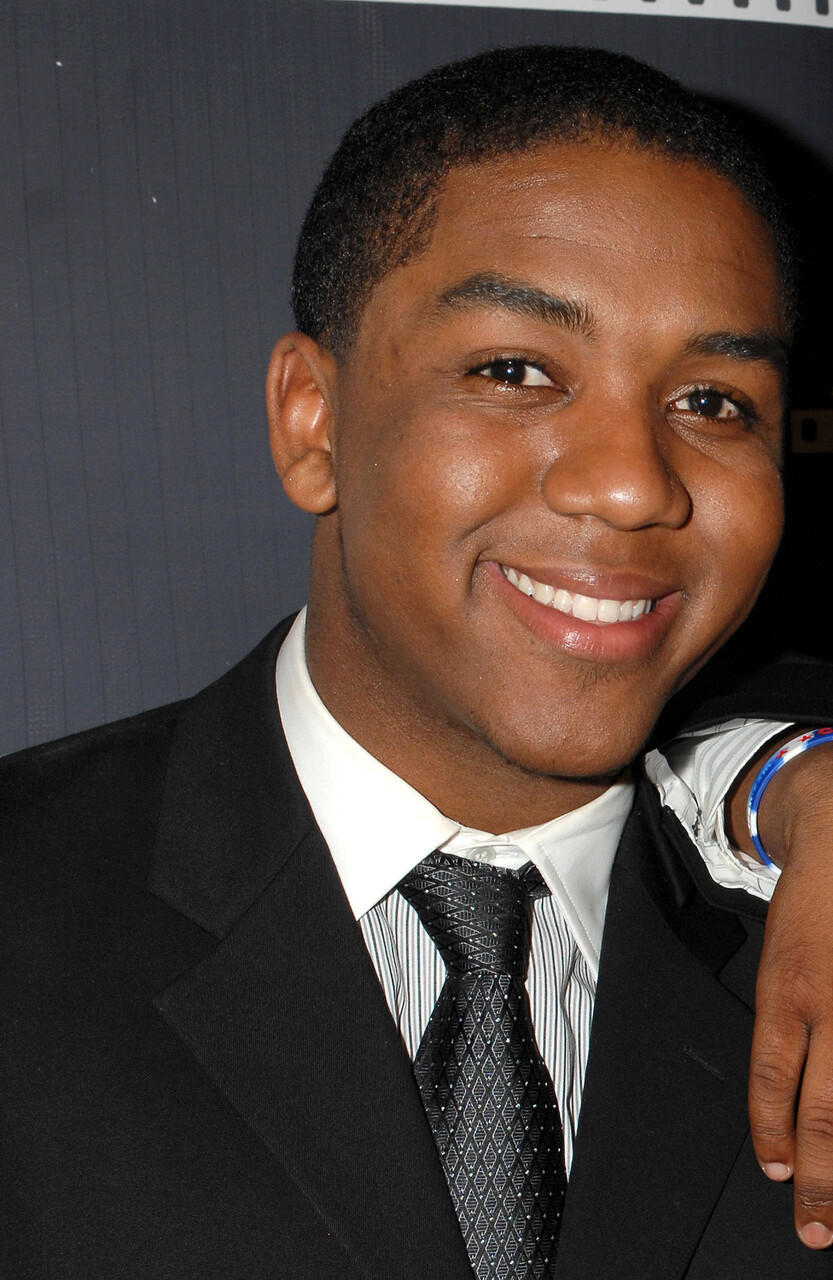
- Massey in 2009
- Born: Christopher Michael Massey; January 26, 1990 (age 36); Atlanta, Georgia, U.S.
- Other name: Chris Massey
- Occupations: Actor; rapper
- Years active: 1994–present
- Spouse: Tatyana Tutson (m. 2021)
- Children: 3
- Relatives: Kyle Massey (brother); Bryan Massey (step-uncle)

Christopher Michael Massey (born January 26, 1990) is an American rapper and actor, best known for his role as Michael Barret on the Nickelodeon television series Zoey 101 (2005–2008, 2015) and Zoey 102 (2023).

== Career ==
Massey started his acting career at a young age, appearing in commercials for Cap'n Crunch and Pop Tarts. He also has made a guest appearance on Punk'd. He won 2002's Young Artist Award for Outstanding Young Performer in Live Theatre for his role as Young Simba in The Lion King.

Massey had his first starring role as Michael Barret in the Nickelodeon television show Zoey 101. When the show debuted in January 2005, it drew a larger number of viewers aged 9–14 than any premiere on the network in the preceding eight years. Zoey 101 was nominated for an Emmy for Outstanding Children's Program in 2005.

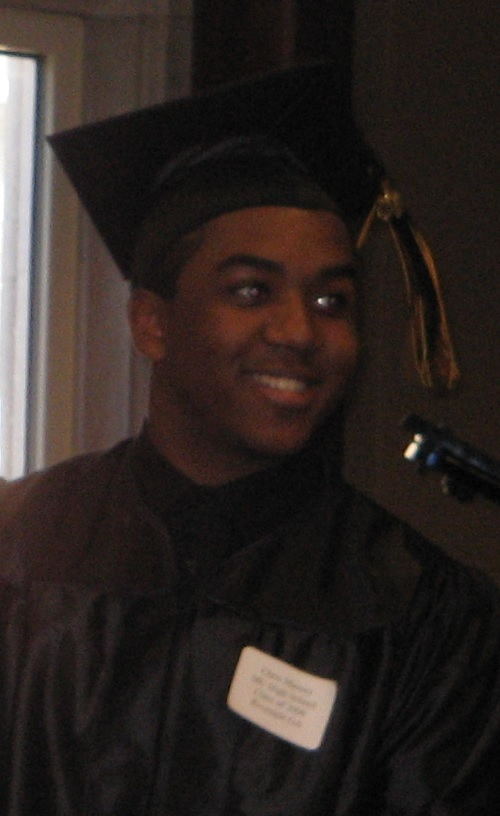
Massey graduating high school in June 2008

Massey is the older brother of Kyle Massey, star of Disney shows Cory in the House, That's So Raven, and Fish Hooks. He guest-starred alongside his brother in a That's So Raven episode titled "Five Finger Discount". The Massey brothers have also had small roles on the sitcom The Parkers, appeared together on The Steve Wilkos Show, and released music together as the Massey Boyz.

On January 12, 2023, Jamie Lynn Spears announced that production had begun on a sequel film, titled Zoey 102, scheduled to premiere in 2023, on Paramount+, with original series cast members Spears, Massey, Sean Flynn, Erin Sanders, Matthew Underwood, Jack Salvatore Jr., and Abby Wilde reprising their roles. Additionally, Nancy Hower was set to direct, with Spears attached as an executive producer. Production began in January 2023 in North Carolina. The film was released on Paramount+ on July 27, 2023.

== Personal life ==
Massey's mother is Angel Massey. He has three children: a daughter named Mariah with reality TV personality Cassalei "Cassie" Jackson, whose mother is actress Shar Jackson; a daughter named Bella; and a son named Carter with Bria Miller, to whom he was previously engaged in 2020. It is now presumed that Massey is married to a woman named Tatyana Tutson, as the result of a Las Vegas wedding in December 2021.

In March 2015, Massey was assaulted and robbed by rapper Lil Twist at Kyle Massey's home in Los Angeles. The rapper reportedly brought four others to aid him in the assault and robbery of the brothers, as well as brass knuckles, and stole Massey's Rolex watch before leaving. Lil Twist pleaded no contest to burglary, grand theft, making criminal threats, battery, and two counts of assault with a deadly weapon and was sentenced to one year in prison.

=== Legal issues ===
In April 2016, TMZ reported that Massey had been arrested and charged with domestic violence, following an incident involving Jackson as they were leaving a nightclub. Massey denied the allegations that he had shoved Jackson, saying the two had been arguing loudly when Jackson fell down, causing security to assume he'd shoved her. Jackson declined to press charges against Massey.

In July 2017, Massey was granted a temporary restraining order against Shar Jackson, his daughter Mariah's maternal grandmother. He told courts that he'd left Mariah in the care of her mother and grandmother for several weeks and that during the time, Jackson had struck Mariah and left a four-inch long gash in her forehead from a razor. A representative for Jackson denied Massey's claims of abuse.

== Filmography ==
=== Film ===
Year	Film	Role	Notes
2010	The Search for Santa Paws	Rasta	Voice
2015	What Did Zoey Say?	Michael Barret	Short based on Zoey 101
2018	That Tree Do Be Growin' - They Grew Up Next To Each Other But He Never Noticed The Tree	Tre' (the "Tree")	Independent film based on Bennington College original and anonymous student theater production with same name
2023	Zoey 102	Michael Barret	

=== Television ===
Year	Series	Role	Notes
2002	The Parkers	Justin	Episode: "The Crush"
2002	That Was Then	N/A	Episode: "A Rock and a Head Case"
2002	The District	Kenyon	Episode: "Resurrection"
2003	Yes, Dear	Boy #2	Episode: "Jimmy's Dumb"
2004	That's So Raven	Jeremy	Episode: "Five Finger Discount"
2005–2008	Zoey 101	Michael Barret	Main role, 60 episodes
2006	Everybody Hates Chris	Kid #1	Episode: "Everybody Hates Drew"
2007	City Girls	Sean Jackson	TV movie
2009	The Electric Company	Baseball player	Episode: "Bananas"
2012	Switched at Birth	Super Jesus	Episode: "Tree of Forgiveness"
2020	All That	Himself	Guest
2023	BMF	Booker	

== Awards and nominations ==
Year	Award	Category	Result
2002	Outstanding Young Performer in Live Theater	Young Artist Awards	Won
2006	Best Young Ensemble Performance in a TV Series (Comedy or Drama)	Young Artist Awards	Won
2007	Best Young Ensemble Performance in a TV Series (Comedy or Drama)	Young Artist Awards	Won
