= Cameron Ocasio =

American actor (born 1999)

- Born: September 7, 1999 (age 26); Long Island City, New York, U.S.
- Occupation: Actor • model
- Years active: 2010–present

Cameron Ocasio (born September 7, 1999) is an American actor and model.

== Early and personal life ==
Ocasio is from Dix Hills, New York, and has one older brother and one younger sister. He has a black belt in martial arts.

== Career ==
He has played various roles in television series and films, such as Caught, Law & Order: Special Victims Unit, and Sinister. He was one of the stars of the Nickelodeon television series Sam & Cat in the role of Dice, for all 35 episodes. He is signed through the International Modeling and Talent Association.

== Filmography ==
=== Film ===
Year	Title	Role	Notes
2011	Caught	Young Kevin	
2012	Love Magical	Robert	
2012	Sinister	BBQ boy	
2012	Child Eater	Lucas	
2013	Over/Under	Tommy	
2013	Fool's Day	Shane	Short film
2014	A Route Less Traveled	Alex Martinez	Short film
2015	Countdown to Blounce	Terrance Hoyabembe	Short film
2018	Love Magical	Robert	
2018	The One	Levi	Short film
2021	Project Pay Day	Curtis	

=== Television ===
Year	Title	Role	Episode(s)
2011	Law & Order: Special Victims Unit	Nico Grey	Episode: "Lost Traveller"
2012	A Gifted Man	Boy with Ball	Episode: "In Case of Co-Dependants"
2013	Nickelodeon Kids' Choice Awards 2013	Himself	TV special
2013–2014	Sam & Cat	Dice Corleone	Main cast; 35 episodes
2014	Nickelodeon Kids Choice Awards 2014	Himself	TV special
2014	Webheads	Himself	Episode: "Boys of Nick Celebrity Edition"
2015	Nickelodeon Kids' Choice Awards 2015	Himself	TV special
2016	Commando Crash	Baxter	Pilot

=== Web ===
Year	Title	Role	Notes
2014	The Lil' Sam & Cat Show	Dice	Episode: "#Lumpatious"

=== Theater ===
Year	Title	Role
2010–2011	Bloody Bloody Andrew Jackson at the Bernard B. Jacobs Theatre	Lyncoya
