= Emily C. A. Snyder =

American dramatist

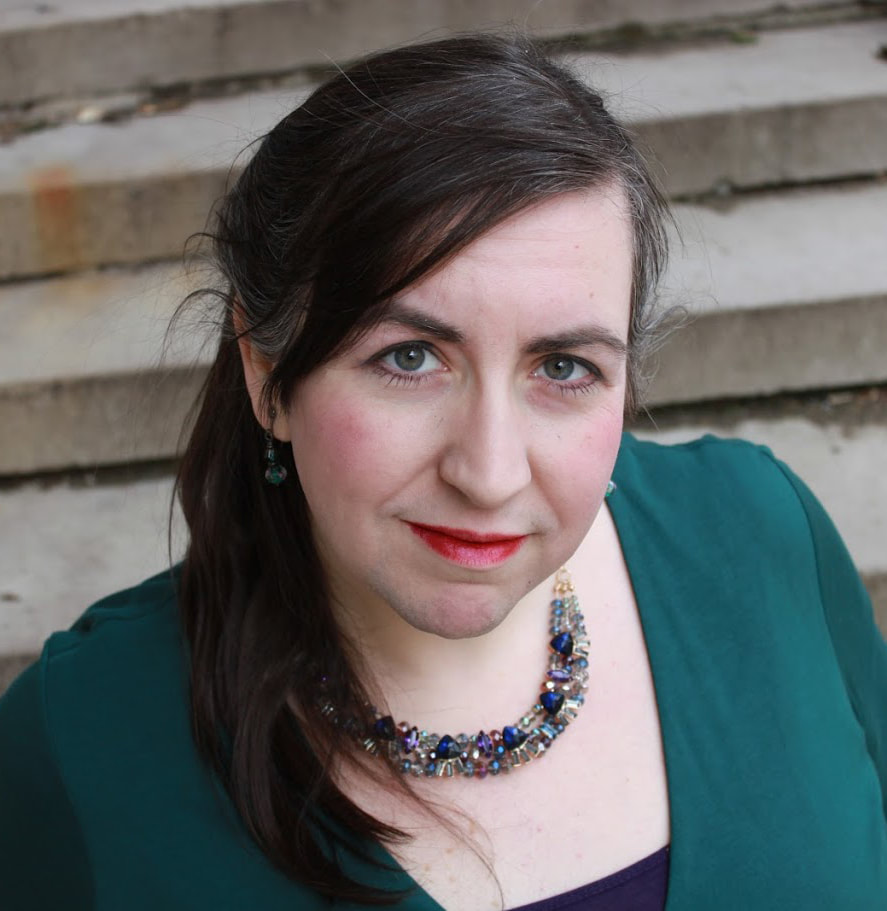
- Born: September 10, 1977 (age 48); Northampton, Massachusetts, U.S.
- Education: Emerson College; Franciscan University of Steubenville
- Occupations: Writer; actor; director; novelist
- Years active: 1991–present
- Organization(s): Turn to Flesh Productions, Hamlet to Hamilton: Exploring Verse Drama
- Notable work: The Inventor's Apprentice (audio), Cupid and Psyche (verse play), Nachtstürm Castle (novel), Niamh and the Hermit (novel)

Emily C. A. Snyder (born September 10, 1977) is an American theatremaker, actor, and novelist. She is the co-founder and artistic director of a New York City theatre company, the author of the Twelve Kingdoms fantasy series, and Jane Austen parodies.

She advocated for women and those underrepresented in classical theatre. Snyder is a feminist and was raised Catholic. As of 2020, Snyder uses she/they/he pronouns and identifies as aromantic.

== Early life and education ==
Snyder was born in Amherst, Massachusetts, where her father, John L. Snyder, studied computer programming, and her mother, Christine Enright Snyder, managed the Newman Center. She is the eldest of four children and attended several schools as her family moved through the Eastern Seaboard.

She graduated summa cum laude from Emerson College in Boston, Massachusetts, where she received her master's degree in theatre education. She received her bachelor's degree from the Franciscan University of Steubenville, double majoring in English Literature and Drama.

In 2000, Snyder trained in John Barton's approach to Shakespeare's verse with Vivian Heilbron and Bernard Lloyd, culminating in a performance in Stratford-upon-Avon, where she portrayed Rosalind from As You Like It. She studied in New York City, where she also taught writing and performing new verse. Snyder is also the host of Hamlet to Hamilton: Exploring Verse Drama, a podcast about writing and performing new verse.

== Turn to Flesh Productions ==
In 2012, Snyder moved to New York City and founded Turn to Flesh Productions (TTF) with fellow Steubenville alumna, Michelle Kafel. Snyder served as the artistic director until 2021 when she handed over the reins to her business partner.

== Literature career ==
In 2008, Snyder began writing and studying new verse drama at Emerson College.

=== The Love and Death Trilogy ===
The Love and Death Trilogy consists of three plays in blank verse, combining the major Greek myths of Cupid, Aphrodite, Adonis, Persephone, Hades, Orpheus, Eurydice, and Psyche into one story. The plays consist of Persephone Rises, covering Persephone's abduction into the Underworld; The Seduction of Adonis, which includes the myth of Adonis and Orpheus and Eurydice as the Loves and Deaths continue to war; and culminating in Cupid and Psyche, about the marriage of Love to Reason. The Love and Death Trilogy received a developmental workshop in 2018 through Turn to Flesh Productions for their fifth season celebration, directed by Snyder.

In 2009, Cupid and Psyche received a workshop presentation at Emerson College. Snyder originally wanted to adapt the myth into an opera, but Huggins rejected that idea. Consequently, Snyder decided to write Cupid and Psyche in blank verse. Snyder deemed that draft of hers as a "bad quarto". Snyder later revised the play in 2014 through Turn to Flesh Productions. She credits collaborator James Parenti and the workshop Dare Lab for enabling her to develop the official script.

Parenti, who played Cupid in the original New York City run in 2014, also went on to develop her early drafts of Persephone Rises and The Seduction of Adonis, including performing a scene at the Darkroom Series with Laura Hooper, reprising her role as Aphrodite. Snyder then worked on Parenti's verse play, May Violets Spring: A New Story for a New Ophelia, first as verse coach for the 2014 premiere with Dare Lab and then as director for the 2016 production through TTF. Cupid and Psyche was a semi-finalist with the Princess Grace Awards in 2010 and again in 2019. It was also a semi-finalist with the American Shakespeare Center in 2018. It received its first Virginia premiere in 2023 at Mary Baldwin College.

=== Novels ===
Snyder started writing with the Twelve Kingdoms novels, including Niamh and the Hermit and Charming the Moon. Her debut novel was favorably reviewed with comparisons to J. R. R. Tolkien, Lord Dunsany, C. S. Lewis, and the Brothers Grimm.

=== Shakespeare-inspired verse plays ===
Snyder's first Shakespearean role was as Feste the Jester in Twelfth Night at the university. She has since gone on to direct 11 of Shakespeare's plays, including A Midsummer Night's Dream twice, and performed in 25 of his plays. From 2006 to 2012, Snyder founded and served as artistic director of Gaudete Academy, a camp for adolescents and young adults to present classical work. Simultaneously, she expanded the drama programs of two high school programs in Hudson, Massachusetts, serving as adjunct faculty for the conservatory program at Hudson High School.

In 2017, Snyder created new verse plays for the Shakespeare's New Contemporaries program. Snyder's first Shakespeare play, A Comedy of Heirors, or The Imposters, was named a finalist with the ASC, as was "The Top 15 NYC Plays of '17" by A Work Unfinishing.

In 2018, Snyder wrote The Merry Widows of Windsor, a sequel to Shakespeare's The Merry Wives of Windsor. This received two staged readings through the Sheen Center in New York City, where Snyder took one of the titular roles as Alice Ford, opposite frequent collaborator Abby Wilde as Margaret Page.

In 2019, Snyder began developing her take on Romeo and Juliet, originally titled Romeo and Juliet Combative. Although Snyder did not originally intend to rewrite any of Shakespeare's play, having successfully directed the show in 2008, she eventually became convinced by her collaborators to provide additional scenes and soliloquies. TTF provided a staged reading with Snyder in the titular role of Juliet opposite Ari Dalbert. TTF decided to give the play, now titled Juliet and Her Romeo, a full production at the Kraine Theatre as part of their residency with Frigid NYC for Valentine's 2020, with Snyder reprising her role of Juliet.

As of 2022, Snyder is a PhD candidate on writing new verse with the Shakespeare Institute in Stratford-upon-Avon.

=== French farce ===
In 2018, Snyder produced The Other, Other Woman, a French farce play, written largely in rhyming couplets. She first premiered a sneak peek scene, where she played the prologue and Mother Abbess at the Sheen Center. Reviewer Zelda Knapp wrote that "When the rhyming couplets break apart into simple and honest speech, the audience takes a collective breath and holds it. The ache of love unexpressed and inexpressible." Snyder herself seemed to indicate that the play was largely autobiographical and cathartic to write.

== Other works ==
=== Medieval plays ===
In 2019, Snyder premiered her feminist Arthurian duology, The Table Round and The Siege Perilous. The duology combined the myths of King Arthur, Queen Guinevere, and Sir Lancelot, Merlin vs. Morgan le Fay, the Lady of Shalott, Sir Gawain and the Green Knight, Tristan and Isolde, the Grail Quest and the Fall of Camelot. She developed the script through improvisations and public readings, including a "spit draft" presentation, which is a partially completed script with humorous interstitial materials, presented as a performance. Snyder had been writing her take on the Arthur myth as early as 2017, where she apparently had first been considering Tom Hiddleston for the role of Britain's most famous king.

=== Podcaster ===
In 2020, Snyder founded her podcast about writing with co-creator and audio engineer Colin Kovarik. The first episode, "Defining Verse Drama", premiered on 7 October 2020 on the Anchor platform.

Season	Title	Premiere	Episodes
1	Writing Verse Drama	7 October 2020	10
2	Arthur Through the Ages	10 February 2021	13
3	Soliloquy	16 March 2022	9

=== Voice actor ===
Snyder has lent her voice to several projects. Some notable characters include her creation of the shapeshifter, CiCi Stratos, in Once Upon A Monster of the Week, an actual play podcast from Haunted Griffin Entertainment; Caitlin O'Sullivan in The Ghost Ship, an audio drama based on the Boston Metaphysical Society from Queen of Mercia Productions, created and written by Madeline Holly-Rosing; and Hestren in Starfall, created and written by Claudia Elvidge.

Snyder has also appeared on several Shakespeare-adjacent podcasts. For ChopBard. she performed as the Countess Olivia in Twelfth Night and Cordelia in King Lear. Snyder also appeared on Hamlet Isn't Dead's Shakespeare Quiz podcast, That is the Question. Earlier, Snyder had been interviewed by them, speaking about Cupid and Psyche and Turn to Flesh Productions on their podcast, Tales Told by A(n) HIDiot.

Working for Sarah Golding of Quirky Voices Presents, Snyder penned several short pieces. The audio was released on 8 March 2021, during International Women's Day. Snyder provided the script for Quirky Voices's monologue series.
