= Shauna Phelan =

American television producer

Shauna Phelan (born January 30, 1979) is an American television producer and development executive. Since 2022, she has served as EVP and Co-Head of Live-Action Series and Films at Nickelodeon and Awesomeness.

== Early life ==
Phelan was born in New York. She graduated with a bachelor's degree from Harvard University in Visual and Environmental Studies.

== Career ==
In 2002, Phelan began her career in features at Furst Films, where she worked on the films The Cooler and The Matador. Phelan later served as the director of television development at Varsity Pictures, where she developed the Spike TV series Blue Mountain State and the E! series The Royals.

Phelan joined Awesomeness as its head of development and production in 2012. There, she produced dozens of series for Awesomeness’ YouTube channel, including Side Effects and Foursome, the latter of which would go on to become YouTube Premium’s longest-running series.

In 2018, Phelan became the SVP of Live Action Scripted Development and Production at Nickelodeon. During her tenure, she oversaw the development and production of shows such as iCarly, That Girl Lay Lay, Danger Force, and Tyler Perry's Young Dylan.

On June 14, 2022, Paramount Pictures CEO Brian Robbins announced that Phelan had been tapped as the EVP and Co-Head of Live-Action Series and Films at Nickelodeon and Awesomeness.
