= Sam & Cat =

American teen television sitcom

- Genre: Teen sitcom
- Created by: Dan Schneider
- Based on: iCarly and Victorious by Dan Schneider
- Showrunner: Dan Schneider
- Starring: Jennette McCurdy; Ariana Grande; Cameron Ocasio; Maree Cheatham (Note: Cheatham is not listed in the opening credits, but she is listed as "Starring" in the end credits in the episodes she is in. She is not in every episode, so she is both recurring and starring in this show.)
- Theme music composer: Michael Corcoran
- Opening theme: "Just Fine" by Backhouse Mike
- Composers: Michael Corcoran; Zack Hexum
- Country of origin: United States
- Original language: English
- No. of seasons: 1
- No. of episodes: 35

Production
- Executive producers: Dan Schneider; Warren Bell
- Producers: Christopher J. Nowak; Bruce Rand Berman
- Production locations: Nickelodeon on Sunset; Hollywood, California
- Camera setup: Videotape (filmized); Multi-camera
- Running time: 23 minutes
- Production companies: Schneider's Bakery; Nickelodeon Productions

Original release
- Network: Nickelodeon
- Release: June 8, 2013 – July 17, 2014

Related
- iCarly (2007–2012); Victorious (2010–2013); iCarly (2021–2023); Hollywood Arts (2026)

Sam & Cat is an American teen sitcom created by Dan Schneider for Nickelodeon. It is a spin-off of iCarly and Victorious, two teen sitcoms that Schneider also created for Nickelodeon. The series stars Jennette McCurdy as Sam Puckett from iCarly, and Ariana Grande as Cat Valentine from Victorious.

First announced with a pilot order in August 2012, Nickelodeon picked up the pilot to series in November. Production began on a 20-episode order in January 2013 and the show premiered on June 8, 2013. Following high ratings in its initial episodes, Nickelodeon doubled the episode order to 40 in July. In March 2014, Nickelodeon executive told advertisers that the series had been renewed for a second season.

In April 2014, Nickelodeon announced that the series would go on a production hiatus. Following speculation from media outlets, the network confirmed on July 13 that Sam & Cat had been cancelled and the last episode aired on July 17, 2014.

== Plot ==
Ever since Carly Shay moved to Italy with her father, Sam Puckett has been touring the West Coast on her motorcycle and stops in Venice, Los Angeles. She witnesses Cat Valentine being thrown into the back of a garbage truck and rescues her. They become friends and Cat convinces her to become roommates. Rather than getting traditional after-school jobs to make money, Sam and Cat develop an after-school babysitting business called "Sam and Cat's Super Rockin' Fun Time Babysitting Service". Besides Nona, other people involved in their lives are Dice, their next-door neighbor who is notorious for helping people for money, and Goomer, a dim-witted professional MMA fighter whom Dice manages.

== Cast and characters ==
=== Main ===
- Jennette McCurdy as Sam Puckett, a tomboy who is aggressive, loves pranks, and hates working. After her best friend Carly Shay moved to Italy to live with her father, Sam tours the West Coast on her motorcycle until she saves Cat from a garbage truck. She becomes friends with Cat and joins her in the babysitting job they start. She has a heart of gold and a soft spot for Cat-she will threaten violence on anyone who harms her friends. Sam is not afraid of anything and is handy at fighting or bossing her way out of any situation.
- Ariana Grande as Cat Valentine, who is sweet, naive, bubbly, and almost always happy. She has a playful mood, often takes things literally, and faints when she is frightened. She has a short attention span and has bright red hair dyed to resemble her favorite snack, a red velvet cupcake. Cat has been living with her grandmother Nona since her parents went away to visit her brother, who had been sent to a special facility for his "eccentricities". She can be emotional and never takes criticism well. Despite her ditziness, she is actually very smart and empathetic. In the earlier parts of the show, Ariana Grande dyed her hair red when playing Cat Valentine.
- Cameron Ocasio as Dice, Sam and Cat's neighbor. He is a young hair model. He is Goomer's manager, and often tries to sell things to make money.

- Maree Cheatham as Nona, Cat's cheerful, supportive, and independent grandmother. Fun-loving and young at heart, Nona prefers the company of people her own age. Although she is always around whenever Sam and Cat need her, she has moved out of the apartment she shared with Cat and into Elderly Acres to be nearer to her friends, allowing Sam to move in permanently. She is criticized for not being in touch with the younger generation, and tells stories which fail to interest them.

=== Recurring ===
- Zoran Korach as Goomer, a professional mixed martial artist who trains at Punchy's Gym. He is 27 years old but has the mentality of someone much younger. He is very dim-witted and easily confused, but despite his childish nature, he is very good at fighting. Dice took over his management after his original manager claimed Goomer was "too stupid to manage".
- Dan Schneider as the voice of Tandy, a red male robot that works at the restaurant "Bots" as a waiter.
- Lisa Lillien as the voice of Bungle, a blue female robot that works at the restaurant "Bots" as a waitress.
- Nick Gore as Randy, a kid who appeared numerous times in the show and is constantly introducing himself. Randy was rumored to appear in one episode, but the creator of the show, Dan Schneider, found him funny so he became a recurring character.
- Ronnie Clark as Herb, a man who appears to be homeless, but he is in fact rich and owns a condo.

=== Special guest stars ===
- Eric Lange as Mr. Sikowitz, Cat's acting teacher at Hollywood Arts, an eccentric aging hippie who doesn't wear shoes for some reason. His teaching methods are often unconventional, such as when he throws a ball at Cat while she is performing, but they are sometimes effective. He is a recurring character in Victorious and appeared in "#MommaGoomer".
- Penny Marshall and Cindy Williams as Sylvia Burke and Janice Dobbins, the original creators of the puppet show Salmon Cat, a children's show from the 1970s. Marshall and Williams are famous for playing Laverne DeFazio and Shirley Feeney, respectively, on Laverne & Shirley. The characters live in apartment buildings named "Feeney Villas" and "DeFazio Arms".
- Kel Mitchell as Peezy B, a huge rap star who has turned down Cat's music video audition.
- Abby Wilde as Stacey Dillsen, a character from Zoey 101. She appeared in the episode "#MadAboutShoe".
- Scott Baio as Officer Kelvin, a police officer who arrests Sam and Cat for "stealing money" from an ATM at the Handy Quick when Yokvish catches on to Cat's project.
- Elizabeth Gillies as Jade West, Cat's friend from Hollywood Arts. She is mean, aggressive, violent, and often offends Cat. She befriends Sam when they discover that they have a lot in common.
- Nathan Kress as Freddie Benson, Sam's friend from Seattle and ex-boyfriend. He likes technology, and served as technical producer of the web show on iCarly. Cat brings him to her house in order to flirt with him at the time when Sam was hanging out with Jade.
- Matt Bennett as Robbie Shapiro, Cat's friend and love interest. He is a nerd who carries a puppet named Rex (who he makes speak as a ventriloquist). He kissed Cat in the last few episodes of Victorious. When Cat hits on Freddie out of jealousy of Sam's friendship with Jade, Robbie is brought in by Jade so that Sam can hit on him.
- Michael Eric Reid as himself, he plays Sinjin Van Cleef in Victorious. Michael appears in "#BlooperEpisode" and tells Zoran Korach that he knows what it's like to be left out for not being a main character.
- Danielle Morrow as Nora Dershlit, an old enemy of Carly, Sam, and Freddie. In "#SuperPsycho", her pet chicken Maurice helps Nora escape from the prison somewhere near Seattle so that she can exact her revenge.
- Reed Alexander as Nevel Papperman, an old enemy of Carly, Sam, and Freddie. In "#SuperPsycho", Nevel is seen in a Peter Sinai hospital for the very sick upon contracting Porcupox (a disease which somehow comes from a porcupine). Sam and Cat visit him in order to get advice on how to find Nora Dershlit.
- Noah Munck as Gibby Gibson, a friend of Carly, Sam, and Freddie. After he is visited by Nora during his date with a girl at a movie theater, Gibby tips off Sam that Nora has escaped from prison.
- Jessica Chaffin as Coco Wexler, a character from Zoey 101 whom Sam and Cat meet at the airport. Coco was once married to Carl, then they divorced. Coco is devastated when Carl proposes to her mother.
- Josh Server as Agent Partridge, an airport agent who interrogates Dice and Goomer after they are mistaken for a terrorist plot.

=== Guest stars ===
- River Alexander as Dilben, a rude, annoying and obnoxious boy who claims his father is the landlord of the apartment building, and threatens to kick the girls out of their apartment unless they get rid of a goat they are looking after. He only appears in the episode "#NewGoat". He has an obsession for wearing capes, and each one of his appearances in the episode usually end with Sam pulling his trousers around his head, putting his shirt around his legs, and stealing his cape. At the end of the episode, it turns out Dilben's father isn't the landlord of the apartment building, but instead sells "wide shoes to wide-footed women", which Dilben finds embarrassing.
- Griffin Kane and Emily Skinner as Max and Chloe, a brother and sister who, alongside their baby brother Darby, were among the less rambunctious kids babysit on Nona; Sam and Cat babysit them now. They appear in episodes "#Pilot", "#NewGoat", and "#PeezyB".
- Sophia Grace Brownlee and Rosie McClelland as Gwen and Ruby, British cousins whom Sam and Cat babysit in the episode "#TheBritBrats". At first they seem polite, but later they behave quite rudely. They are experienced con artists who cheat Dice out of $500 and Cat out of her bicycle. In a loose parody of The Sting, Sam concocts a rigged bingo game to trick the British brats into surrendering Dice's money and Cat's bike. They also were in "#RevengeOfTheBritBrats" where they return and try to destroy Sam & Cat's friendship. This plan failed when Sam and Cat caught onto their plans.
- Cyrus Arnold as BJ Malloy, a boy who loves to eat eggs and call Dice "Diceberg", because it rhymes with "iceberg" and this attitude stresses Dice. He considers Dice as his friend.
- Steve Lewis as Brody, a spear fisherman that always boasts his job and is often seen with a speargun in his hand.
- Ryan P. Shrime as Yokvish, a clerk at the Handy Quick who enjoys taking selfies and grooming himself. He appeared in "#MagicATM" and "#BlueDogSoda".

== Episodes ==
The first season was originally planned to have 20 episodes, but on July 11, 2013, Nickelodeon doubled the order to 40. However, only 36 were produced, and 35 were aired (two produced episodes were merged into a single special for airing).

No.	Title	Directed by	Written by	Original release date	Prod. code	U.S. viewers (millions)
1	"#Pilot"	Steve Hoefer	Dan Schneider	June 8, 2013	101	4.16
Set after the events of the iCarly series finale "iGoodbye", Sam Puckett (Jennette McCurdy, reprising her role from iCarly) arrives at a food truck in Los Angeles, and sees a girl getting dumped into a garbage truck. Sam runs off to save her. Later, the girl introduces herself as Cat Valentine (Ariana Grande, reprising her role from Victorious). To thank Sam, Cat lets her reside at her grandmother Nona's apartment with her. The next day, Cat learns Sam took Nona to a retirement community called Elderly Acres. While heading out to see her, Sam and Cat run into three kids, Chloe, Max, and Darby, whom Nona was supposed to babysit. They take the kids with them to Elderly Acres, and the kids drive off on an electric wheelchair. Cat and Nona's neighbor Dice (Cameron Ocasio) helps the girls track down the three kids at Inside-Out Burger. The restaurant's manager faints after chasing around the kids on the wheelchair. The girls perform their version of CPR on him and save him. They are rewarded with free cheeseburgers for the rest of their lives. Afterward, Sam gets ready to leave, but Cat, not wanting to stay alone, asks her to stay. Sam agrees and they become roommates. Guest stars: Griffin Kane as Max, Emily Skinner as Chloe
2	"#FavoriteShow"	Steve Hoefer	Dan Schneider	June 15, 2013	102	2.58
Sam and Cat attempt to save their favorite TV show That's a Drag from being cancelled, but despite Cat's best and desperate efforts, she and Sam are unable to convince the producer to keep the show airing. Sam asks for Dice's help in stealing a zebra-print lamp from the show so she can give it to Cat. Sam creates a distraction by faking an injury, and Dice tries to steal the lamp. Dice is caught, but Sam manages to trick the workers into delivering all the show's props to their apartment rather than to the warehouse. Sam and Dice decorate the apartment with the props, and they surprise Cat. And though Cat is worried that Nona will be mad at her for removing the old furniture, when Nona stops by she fails to notice any difference.
3	"#TheBritBrats"	Adam Weissman	Dan Schneider & Jake Farrow	June 22, 2013	104	3.11
While Cat babysits two British girls, Gwen and Ruby, Dice notices that they have a "Pear Phone 6", a phone that has not yet been released in America. Dice strikes a deal with them to buy five new Pear Phones for $500. When he gets the package, he realizes they tricked him and sold him rocks instead. Cat visits the girls to see what went wrong, and ends up trading her bike for bibble, a fictional popcorn snack that she covets. However, instead of bibble, she receives a tin of cotton swabs. In the end, they trick Gwen and Ruby in a bingo game at Elderly Acres and get their stuff back with the help of two police officers who perform a fake raid. Dice gets his money back, Cat gets her bike back, and Sam gets her community service form signed. Guest stars: Sophia Grace Brownlee & Rosie McClelland as Gwen and Ruby
4	"#NewGoat"	Steve Hoefer	Dan Schneider & Warren Bell	June 29, 2013	103	2.96
The girls babysit a pygmy goat given to them by Dice. Their landlord's son, Dilben, threatens them with eviction as goats are not allowed in their apartment. Sam and Cat try to convince Dilben that they have gotten rid of the goat, but Dilben sees it and threatens to notify his father. He also warns them that they need to live with an adult. Sam, Cat, Dice, and Dice's client Goomer hatch a scheme to convince the landlord that the two girls indeed live with an adult and do not have a goat. They ultimately find out, however, that Dilben's father is not the landlord, and that the man he has been passing off as his father is, in fact, an actor. Guest stars: Zoran Korach as Goomer, Griffin Kane as Max, Emily Skinner as Chloe, River Alexander as Dilben
5	"#TextingCompetition"	Russ Reinsel	Dan Schneider & Christopher J. Nowak	July 13, 2013	108	3.38
Sam and Cat babysit Butler, a champion speed-texter, and discover that Sam is also a fast texter. She and Butler enter a texting competition and the two make the finals. Before the finals begin, Butler's mother glues Sam's hand to Cat's foot to ensure Butler can win more easily. Sam ends up texting with one hand, and Butler drops his phone on purpose to get back at his mother. Butler is content with his consolation prize, a bike. Cat, on the other hand, is shocked at the tiny size of the speed boat that she and Sam won. Neither of them care to meet the Vice President of the United States, another prize for winning the competition. Guest stars: Jack DeSena as Host of Texting Competition, Susan Huckle as Debbie Torso (Mrs. Torso), Jake Brennan as Butler Torso Absent: Maree Cheatham as Nona
6	"#BabysitterWar"	Steve Hoefer	Dan Schneider & Christopher J. Nowak	July 20, 2013	105	3.29
After Sam and Cat babysit a boy who tells them "You are the best babysitter ever!", the two argue about which girl he meant, and decide to make their next appointment a competition to see which of the two is the better babysitter, with the winner getting the master bedroom. When they babysit Daisy, Jarvis, and Sophie, they each do things to get the kids to like them. Sam and Cat then ask them which of the two they like better, and it turns out to be a tie since Sophie did not want to choose. The babysitters realize they work best as a team and share the master bedroom. Guest stars: Rachel Eggleston, Justin Ellings, Ellee Jo Trowbridge Absent: Maree Cheatham as Nona
7	"#GoomerSitting"	Adam Weissman	Dan Schneider & Warren Bell	July 27, 2013	106	2.66
Dice asks Sam and Cat to babysit Goomer for one night, while Dice goes to Phoenix for hair modeling. They agree to do so, with conditions. The babysitting does not go as planned, as Cat accidentally puts Goomer's tongue-drop medicine in his eyes, blinding him the night before his big match against the undefeated John "Skull Crusher" Zakappa. During the fight, Goomer's chances are as good as his impaired vision, but he ends up winning after the "Skull Crusher" enrages him by making fun of Dice's hair (which is happening as Goomer's vision returns). Afterward, Zakappa cries that he wants a re-match and when he pushes Sam aside, after she tells him to accept the defeat, she wrestles him to the mat where the fight took place. Guest star: Zoran Korach as Goomer Absent: Maree Cheatham as Nona
8	"#ToddlerClimbing"	Adam Weissman	Dan Schneider & Jake Farrow	August 3, 2013	107	2.87
Sam and Cat find out they have been receiving negative reviews on a web site following a cancelled appointment. Sam calls up her tech-savvy friend Freddie who traces the authors of the reviews. It is discovered all of the reviews came from the same location, the house of a competing babysitting service. Sam and Cat then go to the house and confront those babysitters. Sam warns them to delete the reviews and threatens to beat them up, but Cat reminds her about the babysitter code. They then send Dice, dressed as a child with a hat cam, to spy on the competing babysitters and discover that they have set up a toddler-climbing competition in their basement to gamble. Sam and Cat go to their house again and threaten to upload the video of their competition unless they delete the reviews and stop babysitting. Guest star: Issac Ryan Brown as Kip Dooley
9	"#MommaGoomer"	Dan Frischman	Dan Schneider & Christopher J. Nowak	August 10, 2013	111	2.48
Goomer's mother comes to town, having no idea her son is an MMA fighter. Sam and Cat must help convince her that he is a high school history teacher instead, because if she finds out his real job, she will take him back home to Louisiana. The girls set up a fake class at Hollywood Arts (the school Cat attends, going back to Victorious), but their plan falls apart when Mr. Sikowitz does not find an online charity Goomer is associated with. Goomer then admits to his mother that he is indeed a fighter; she becomes outraged and makes him pack his things. When the group enters an alleyway near Goomer's apartment, three thugs try to steal his mother's purse, prompting Goomer to beat them up. She then realizes the benefits of his talent and allows him to stay in L.A. Guest stars: Eric Lange as Mr. Sikowitz (reprising his role from Victorious), Zoran Korach as Goomer Absent: Maree Cheatham as Nona
10	"#BabysittingCommercial"	Steve Hoefer	Dan Schneider & Warren Bell	September 14, 2013	112	2.33
Sam and Cat make a commercial for their business, which features Dice's dog Opee. A rich family comes to the girls' apartment and claims the dog is theirs. They point out that they lost their dog six months earlier, around the time Dice found Opee in an alley, and demand it be returned. Their daughter is champion of a dog dancing competition, and the dog is key to her routine. When they do not get the dog back, they threaten to return with a court order and a police officer. Sam and Cat try several animal shelters, looking for an identical dog. They finally find one that looks exactly like Opee, but the owner of the shelter says it is vicious. After they give the identical dog to the family, the daughter re-enters the dog dancing competition, and the dog violently attacks her on live television when she picks it up.
11	"#RevengeOfTheBritBrats"	Adam Weissman	Dan Schneider & Warren Bell	September 21, 2013	109	2.32
Gwen and Ruby return for another vacation from England and drive a wedge between Sam and Cat. They finally repay Cat with a real can of bibble, Sam with a vibrating motorcycle helmet, and both sitters with a special British toilet plunger. In reality, Gwen and Ruby are using these gifts for a revenge plot in retaliation for what happened to them in the bingo game (see "#TheBritBrats" above). Gwen reclaims Cat's can of bibble and sprinkles some bibble crumbs onto Sam's bed. Later, she paints Sam's motorcycle pink, while Ruby paints Cat's hand likewise. Sam and Cat argue with one another over these incidents, thinking they did it to each other for revenge. They part ways the next day to calm down. Goomer rationally points out to Sam that it could have simply been Gwen and Ruby's revenge. Nona relays the same logic to Cat. The girls gladly reunite and plot revenge against Gwen and Ruby. In order to trick the young Brits, they pretend to engage in a colossal fight in their apartment, and Sam uses the toilet plunger to make it look as if Cat has died. Never having wanted their revenge plot to escalate to death, Gwen and Ruby feel wretched about what they have done and quickly turn against one another, throwing a fit outside. Sam and Cat happily observe the fight, leaving the two to duke it out until they decide they need to call Gwen and Ruby's uncle. Guest stars: Sophia Grace Brownlee & Rosie McClelland as Gwen and Ruby, Zoran Korach as Goomer
12	"#MotorcycleMystery"	Steve Hoefer	Dan Schneider & Jake Farrow	September 28, 2013	110	2.47
Cat has a test coming up, so Dice, Goomer and Sam leave her to study, and head to a mixed-martial arts fight. When the three return, they find Cat asleep and handcuffed to a small, angry, foreign man. Sam's motorcycle is also missing, prompting her to wake up Cat, who cannot remember anything that happened because of a drug misuse. She also wonders why her hair is blue, but finds out she was with Nona at Elderly Acres earlier in the day. The gang heads there first in search of answers, and finds out Cat then went to a restaurant called Bots with an elderly man, who took her on Sam's motorcycle. So they head to Bots next and look through security footage. They discover John Zakappa (whom Goomer fought in "#GoomerSitting") stole the motorcycle, and Cat handcuffed herself to Zakappa's friend Hector. The gang meets with Zakappa to retrieve the motorcycle in exchange for his friend, but he gets tricked as Sam and Cat decide to keep Hector. Guest star: Zoran Korach as Goomer, Brad Williams as Hector
13	"#SecretSafe"	Adam Weissman	Dan Schneider & Jake Farrow	October 5, 2013	113	1.97
Sam discovers a safe in her bedroom closet, and attempts to crack it. The girls decide to look after Dice after he complains about having to go with his mother and aunt to Puzzle-Con for the weekend. Dice then complains after Sam and Cat do not allow him to go to a poker game with college students. But when Sam finally unlocks the safe, and the girls check out an abandoned room inside, Dice locks them in and sneaks out. The girls stay stranded in the room for a long time, until Goomer frees them. Sam and Cat soon realize that Dice never went to any poker game, but was instead dancing at a kid's birthday party, to earn money to replace his mother's laptop. They lock Dice in the safe as revenge for what he put them through. Guest star: Zoran Korach as Goomer Absent: Maree Cheatham as Nona
14	"#OscarTheOuch"	Russ Reinsel	Dan Schneider & Dave Malkoff	October 12, 2013	115	2.15
When Cat saves an old man at Elderly Acres from getting hit by a scooter, the man's daughter asks the babysitting duo to look after her accident-prone son, Oscar. The boy is limited to using a rubber cup for his drinks, and eating cold, wet noodles without any utensils. Cat feels sorry for Oscar, so she plans to make his day as fun as possible, while trying to keep him safe with the help of the gang. However, a series of "predicaments" happen to Oscar while in Sam and Cat's care, leading his mother to chastise the duo when she picks him up. Oscar stands up for the girls, saying that even though he got hurt, he actually had fun. Guest star: Zoran Korach as Goomer
15	"#DollSitting"	Steve Hoefer	Dan Schneider & Christopher J. Nowak	October 19, 2013	114	2.63
On Halloween night, Sam dresses up like Cat while Cat dresses up like a genie. Sam and Cat are hired by Mr. Drange, a man Cat met by a graveyard, to babysit a creepy doll he calls Clarice. Dice gives Cat a spell book, and Cat tries to use a spell on him. She later suspects she may have turned him into a monkey, but Sam tries to convince Cat that Dice was not affected by the spell. Meanwhile, the doll seems to be in a new location every time Sam and Cat look at it, terrifying them. Mr. Drange returns and instructs them to take Clarice to a Del DeVille concert. While performing his latest song, Del recognizes Clarice, who has caused him nothing but trouble; consequently, Sam and Cat, as well as the doll, are escorted out by security guards. Afterward, Cat gets annoyed with Mr. Drange and complains, telling him to stop pretending the doll is his daughter as he is freaking everyone out. In a twist ending, the doll comes to life as a little girl, revealing that Clarice is really Mr. Drange's daughter. Absent: Maree Cheatham as Nona
16	"#PeezyB"	Paul Coy Allen	Dan Schneider & Jake Farrow	November 2, 2013	119	3.02
Cat's audition to appear in a Peezy B music video ends in tears. She says the famous rapper was mean to her, ridiculing her hair, her dancing, and the hat she wore to the audition. This angers Sam, and she is set to take revenge on Peezy. As she confronts him, however, Peezy realizes she has the "swaggy spunk" and hires her to be his new assistant. This proves to be a hardship for Cat, as she faces difficulties babysitting without Sam, so Cat finds someone to take Sam's place. In the end, seeing how much it has affected Cat, Sam quits as Peezy's assistant. Guest stars: Kel Mitchell as Peezy B, Zoran Korach as Goomer, Griffin Kane as Max, Emily Skinner as Chloe Absent: Maree Cheatham as Nona
17	"#SalmonCat"	Russ Reinsel	Dan Schneider & Christopher J. Nowak	November 9, 2013	117	2.36
Sam and Cat are ordered by a lawyer to rename their babysitting business because it is too similar to the name of a popular kids' TV show from the 1970s, Salmon Cat. They track down the show's two original creators—Sylvia Burke and Janice Dobbins—and seek to have the trademark infringement suit revoked. However, they soon realize Sylvia and Janice are not on speaking terms after quarreling over a trophy for their show, more than 30 years ago. So the babysitters devise a plan to get the two to meet, but things go wrong when they fight, and injure each other. Ultimately, Sylvia and Janice sign the papers, which allow Sam and Cat to keep the name of their babysitting service. Special guest stars: Penny Marshall (Sylvia Burke), Cindy Williams (Janice Dobbins) Note: Marshall and Williams are best known for portraying the title characters of the '70s sitcom Laverne & Shirley. The opening moments of this episode's theme song parody the opening part of the Laverne & Shirley theme song.
18	"#Twinfection"	Steve Hoefer	Dan Schneider & Jake Farrow	November 16, 2013	116	2.39
When Cat attempts a magic trick on Sam, and fails, Sam comes to the conclusion that Cat is not as smart as she. Determined to outsmart her roommate, Cat finds two twin boys at Bots and asks their mom if she can babysit them. The elaborate scheme Cat and the twins pull off to trick Sam works, and Cat celebrates her victory. Sam seeks revenge by getting her twin sister Melanie (Jennette McCurdy, reprising a dual role from the iCarly episode "iTwins") out to Los Angeles from her boarding school in Vermont, then making up an illness known as "twinfection". The two devise a plan using the "twinfection" premise, and play a trick on Cat. Guest star: Zoran Korach as Goomer Absent: Maree Cheatham as Nona
19	"#MyPoober"	Steve Hoefer	Dan Schneider & Warren Bell	November 23, 2013	118	2.91
Sam and Cat are about to babysit an eleven-year-old girl named Ellie, but the girl's mother talks to them first wanting to make a deal with the two to get rid of Poober, Ellie's stuffed animal since she was three. They soon find out Ellie is overprotective of Poober and refuses to give it up. Even when Cat is able to get Poober away from Ellie through persuasion, which also leads Cat to blab the secret of where she and Sam stash their babysitting money, a small storage container disguised as a pineapple, Ellie finds a way to get Poober back. The duo discuss ways to dispose of Poober and decide on sending it into outer space. They use Goomer's toy rocket for Poober's farewell, but before they launch the rocket, Ellie wants to have a final moment with her companion. She ends up rescuing Poober, and replacing it with the pineapple full of Sam and Cat's money. As the rocket does not go far, Goomer drives Sam, Cat, Dice, and Ellie to track it down. They find it in a graveyard, where Sam and Cat reclaim their pineapple and leave Ellie stranded with the caretaker. Guest star: Zoran Korach as Goomer Absent: Maree Cheatham as Nona
20	"#MadAboutShoe"	Steve Hoefer	Story by : Lisa Lillien; Teleplay by : Dan Schneider & Christopher J. Nowak	November 30, 2013	120	2.27
Sam eats all of the meatballs that Cat has prepared for a special moon dinner, and wants more. While the two are on their way to the store to get ingredients for more meatballs, Cat becomes obsessed with a pink shoe she finds in some bushes and then wears. Cat promises Sam she will make more meatballs after she finds the matching pink shoe. They eventually discover, through a clip from a reality show and a newspaper article, the shoe Cat found belongs to Stacey Dillsen (Abby Wilde, reprising her role from Zoey 101). They visit the hospitalized Stacey, seriously injured in the bike accident the two saw in the reality show clip, and they obtain the other shoe. They steal their way out of the hospital, and enjoy a fresh batch of meatballs to celebrate the special moon event. Guest star: Abby Wilde as Stacey Dillsen
21	"#MagicATM"	Adam Weissman	Dan Schneider & Christopher J. Nowak	January 4, 2014	123	3.15
At a convenience store called Handy Quick, Cat shows Sam an ATM which gives away "free" money whenever a special code is entered. Cat takes advantage of the ATM's quirk, getting money from it regularly, not realizing it is wrong. Even Sam warns her of the consequences, but the girls use the money to buy stuff anyway. Yokvish, the store's clerk, eventually catches Cat in the act of emptying the ATM, and informs an approaching policeman who arrests Cat on the spot. With Sam joining her roommate in the police car, the two unexpectedly find themselves in a high-speed pursuit of a stolen car on their way to the station. Due to a lapse in judgment that causes the arresting officer to fall asleep at the wheel, Sam ends up taking the law into her own hands and catches the car thief by herself. Later, the police repossess everything Sam and Cat bought with the stolen money, and inform the girls they need to pay back what they took from the ATM. Sam and Cat get off the hook when Yokvish does not press charges against them, and even more so after the police discuss the person Sam caught, a criminal wanted in three states, resulting in a reward that more than covers the money they stole. Guest stars: Scott Baio as Officer Kelvin, Freedom as Policeman #1, Zoran Korach as Goomer (only appears in the credits) Absent: Maree Cheatham as Nona (only appears in the credits)
22	"#Lumpatious"	Russ Reinsel	Dan Schneider & Jake Farrow	January 11, 2014	122	3.38
Sam and Cat help Lucas, a boy they are babysitting, with his vocabulary. As the time arrives for him to go home, Lucas informs his sitters that his brother Jepson is picking him up rather than his mother. Jepson's reputation makes him hated by most, and he mocks Cat for using the word nonconscious (instead of "unconscious"). It provokes Lucas into calling his brother lumpatious, which Jepson says is not a real word. Sam and Cat make a bet with Jepson that it is a word, but then find no proof of the word's existence in any dictionary, including the most authoritative Oxnard English Dictionary. Determined to bring the word into existence, the girls go to Oxnard and meet the "Word Keepers", who say the two must provide evidence of the word's use, and would accept a famous person's saying the word. The girls have no luck with their mission, until they catch the governor of New Jersey at Inside-Out Burger, where they get him to say lumpatious on video, despite the security surrounding his van. With the evidence they need, Sam and Cat show the video to the Word Keepers, who then add the word to the dictionary. Jepson then goes through the humiliation of losing the bet. Note: The governor of New Jersey in this episode is listed in the credits as Governor Jenkins (Timothy E. Goodwin), and is a spoof of Governor Chris Christie of New Jersey.
23	"#TheKillerTunaJump: #Freddie #Jade #Robbie"	Adam Weissman	Dan Schneider & Warren Bell	January 18, 2014	999 (124–25)	4.84
Cat becomes jealous after Sam befriends her friend Jade, so she decides to call Sam's old friend Freddie and lies to him about Sam being in an accident to get him to L.A., where she flirts with him. Sam then befriends Cat's old friend Robbie, and kisses him to make Cat even more mad with her. Dice buys some tuna fish from the "dirty skipper" by gambling but he did not know they were dangerous. He has to find a place to keep them but needs the money. Sam volunteers to jump the killer tuna fish with her motorcycle, but Cat thinks this is crazy and takes Sam's place by locking her up. Sam later breaks out and saves Freddie as he and Robbie fall into the tank full of tuna fish, leaving the latter still inside. After the incident, Sam and Cat visit Freddie and Robbie at the hospital where they make up. Special guest stars: Nathan Kress (Freddie Benson from iCarly), Matt Bennett (Robbie Shapiro from Victorious), Elizabeth Gillies (Jade West from Victorious) Guest stars: Mary Scheer (Marissa Benson from iCarly), Cyrus Arnold, Steve Lewis Note: This is a one-hour extended episode. It is the highest rated episode of the series.
24	"#YayDay"	Steve Hoefer	Dan Schneider & Warren Bell	January 20, 2014	121	2.93
Cat invents a holiday called "Yay Day" so she can buy gifts for and receive gifts from everyone. Sam initially does not embrace the idea of a holiday just for presents, but eventually warms to it and goes shopping for everyone, including Cat, whom Sam does not trust because of her tendency to snoop. The night before the holiday, Cat peeks at what Sam got her and finds it insulting. That prompts Cat the next day to trade an expensive coat she got Sam for a stained, dirty pillow, which she then presents as Sam's present. In the end, Cat finds out that the present labeled for her was actually for Goomer, and that Sam merely mixed up the gift tags; what Sam actually purchased for her roommate was something she truly wanted. Sam then leaves the apartment, upset over her unwanted present, and Cat later finds her near a sidewalk. The two have a talk, with Sam telling Cat about an unpleasant gift her mother gave her when she was nine. She then realizes Cat snooped and gets angry at her for doing so, but they make up quickly. Cat apologizes for giving Sam the pillow and mends their friendship.
25	"#BrainCrush"	Dan Frischman	Dan Schneider & Jake Farrow	February 8, 2014	126	2.74
Sam and Cat attend a birthday party at Bots, where the kids are all playing a new game called Brain Crush. The game is so addictive that none of them pay attention to the party. Later, Dice becomes addicted to the game, then Nona, and her fellow seniors at Elderly Acres. Cat almost tries Brain Crush herself, but Sam pulls her away in time. Meanwhile, Cat prepares to star in a play called Baberaham Lincoln (where she portrays a British, female version of Abraham Lincoln). With her entire audience focused on Brain Crush, though, they ignore her performance, and Cat runs off crying. In order to make it up to Cat, Sam enlists martial arts kids from a nearby dojo to destroy the audience's electronic devices, thus forcing them to watch Cat's play.
26	"#BlueDogSoda"	Adam Weissman	Christopher J. Nowak & Dan Schneider	February 15, 2014	127	2.50
Sam and Cat find out their favorite beverage, Blue Dog Soda, has been banned statewide due to its high sugar content. A gruff government agent named Mark Bonner confiscates the remaining soda at Handy Quick, and happens to see a sign advertising Sam and Cat as babysitters. Defying the ban, the girls involve themselves, along with Goomer and Dice, in a secret manufacturing operation. Cat figures out the soda's recipe and sales take off, yet the gang becomes paranoid and decides to shut production down. Before they can, agent Bonner shows up at the apartment, and the girls panic, assuming he knows about their illegal venture; he is only there so they can babysit his son. The gang briefly resumes production, this time to stockpile soda for themselves. When Bonner returns, he hears an explosion and quickly figures out what is happening. Just as he is about to apprehend the gang, Sam, Cat, Goomer, and Dice point out the hypocrisy of banning various products or habits that are only dangerous in excess. Bonner sees what they are saying and feels remorse; they are then allowed to drink the soda. Guest star: Lee Reherman as Mark Bonner Absent: Maree Cheatham as Nona
27	"#BlooperEpisode"	Adam Weissman	Dan Schneider & Jake Farrow	February 22, 2014	128	2.72
The Sam & Cat cast are on a lunch break from filming Sam & Cat, while the cast is interrupted by fans of the show. The episode includes blooper clips, dancing clips, outtake clips, prop problem clips, exciting clips, yawning montage clips and even some Drake & Josh bloopers. Guest stars: Michael Eric Reid who played Sinjin on Victorious, Jerry Trainor as Spencer Shay
28	"#FresnoGirl"	Steve Hoefer	Dan Schneider & Christopher J. Nowak	March 15, 2014	129	2.74
Sam and Cat babysit a girl named Kim, who is struggling with math in school. When Kim reveals she wants a Fresno Girl doll more than anything, the duo agree to buy her one if she excels on her math test. And she does, so Sam and Cat stick to the deal and take Kim to the Fresno Girl doll store, but they get charged a steep price not only for the doll Kim wants, but also countless "accessories" for it. When Sam later accidentally damages Kim's doll, she and Cat take it back to the store, only to face another steep price for the repair. Sam gets revenge by feeding Fudge Piles (an extremely chewy dessert Cat came up with) to the salespeople, and announcing that merchandise is free while they are unable to talk. Meanwhile, a t-shirt Goomer wears for luck at MMA fights is missing, and he posts fliers to help him find it. The flier is misleading because of how Goomer designs it, making people think he is missing. So after a scout trooper named Randy and his troupe find Goomer, and not the shirt, they are expecting the stated reward and hold him captive until they receive it. Later, Cat discovers Kim lied about her math test and although passed, did not excel. In order to keep her doll, and also in exchange for Goomer's return, Kim agrees to a date with Randy. As for Goomer's t-shirt, it turns out he was wearing it backwards the entire time. Absent: Maree Cheatham as Nona
29	"#StuckInABox"	Dan Frischman	Dan Schneider & Warren Bell	March 22, 2014	130	2.47
Sam has bought tickets for Mystic Mountain, a reopening theme park with roller coasters both she and Cat are eager to ride. Dice and Goomer show up at the girls' apartment and present a giant, metal box that he claims to be used as a magic trick, which can make people disappear. Cat volunteers for the magic trick, only to end up locked in the box. As attempts to free Cat from the box prove futile, and the gang is just hours away from heading to Mystic Mountain, they bring the box to a local magic shop where a famous magician named Vance Anderson works. Vance has the tools to unlock the box, but he also behaves obnoxiously by flirting with Sam and insulting Dice. Regardless, Cat is still trapped after Vance confirms the box is defective. The gang then decides to bring the box, with Cat inside, for the drive to the theme park, except the box is thrust out of the car when Goomer hits a bump in the road, leaving Cat stuck on the side of the road. Guest star: Shayne Topp as Vance Anderson Absent: Maree Cheatham as Nona
30	"#SuperPsycho"	Steve Hoefer	Dan Schneider & Warren Bell	March 29, 2014	133	3.96
When Nora Dershlit (Danielle Morrow reprising her role from the iCarly episodes "iPsycho" and "iStill Psycho") breaks out of prison, she seeks revenge on the iCarly gang. With Carly in Italy, she turns her attention on Sam and obtains her address in Los Angeles from Gibby Gibson (Noah Munck reprising his role from iCarly). Nora spies on Sam, Cat, and Dice at Bots, and kidnaps Dice shortly afterwards. Sam and Cat search frantically for Dice, and learn from Gibby that Nora is responsible for his disappearance. Sam and Cat visit Sam's old nemesis Nevel Papperman (Reed Alexander reprising his role from iCarly) in a mental institute and Nevel deduces that Nora is hiding Dice in an abandoned house. Cat tries to get information out of Nora, but gets trapped in a well where Dice happens to be. Sam arrives just in time to save Cat and Dice, but Nora challenges her to a fight, having worked out in prison for two years. However, on her first kick, Sam grabs her leg and easily pushes Nora down the well. Sam rescues Cat and Dice, and Nora is taken to a maximum security prison. At the end, Nevel escapes from his mental hospital and is having dinner with Gibby. Special guest star: Noah Munck (Gibby Gibson) Guest stars: Reed Alexander (Nevel Papperman), Danielle Morrow (Nora), Ronnie Clark (Herb), Anthony Heald (Dr. Slarm) Note: This episode contained extended content leading into the 2014 Kids' Choice Awards. Absent: Maree Cheatham as Nona
31	"#DroneBabyDrone"	Russ Reinsel	Dan Schneider & Jake Farrow	April 12, 2014	131	2.19
After Cat watches the news for her homework, she and Sam become fascinated by a story about an online vendor that delivers its packages via flying drones. The girls order several useless items, happily receiving them even as the buggy drone smashes their kitchen window. A customer service representative from the retailer shows up, offering them discounted delivery to make up for the problems. Sam and Cat then start ordering as much as possible, to the detriment of their babysitting service. Nona and Dice step in to help out, only to watch a drone mistake one of their infants for a return product and carry it away in its car seat. The gang panics, knowing the baby's mother will soon arrive, and they go to the retailer's factory to find the child. The customer service representative from before approaches them, again with the cheerful attitude that this is a routine mishap, and brings them to a room full of items mistakenly taken by the drones: pets, babies, mailboxes, wigs, etc. They cannot initially identify the correct baby, but Sam pushes Nona to the floor, successfully reproducing an incident which caused the baby to laugh back at their house. One of the drones ends up removing Nona's wig before leaving.
32	"#FirstClassProblems"	Steve Hoefer	Dan Schneider & Christopher J. Nowak	April 26, 2014	132	2.52
After an exhausting babysitting session with two hot-tempered children named Phillip and Kelly Baum, Sam and Cat are offered by their family butler to escort the two to the Bahamas in first class. However, a miscommunication involving the Baum's personal timer devices, and a panicked airport security system shuts down the airport. Dice and Goomer, who brought the timers, are interrogated by two agents, who quickly become exasperated with Goomer's whining and Dice's frustration. To make matters worse, the girls' tickets are unable to get them out of the waiting room, where a distraught Coco Wexler (Jessica Chaffin reprising her role from Zoey 101) is moping over the fact that Carl divorced her and proposed to her mother. After a grueling interrogation, Goomer requests chocolate milk, but upon receiving it, splashes the lady in the face and runs away with Dice in tow. Once again, the airport is shut down, but now with the kids and other people being the only passengers unable to board as Goomer tosses the bag with the timer devices to Sam and Cat. Guest stars: Jessica Chaffin as Coco Wexler, Josh Server as Agent Partridge Absent: Maree Cheatham as Nona
33	"#KnockOut"	Russ Reinsel	Dan Schneider & Jake Farrow	June 7, 2014	134	2.45
Goomer claims he is getting picked on by a fellow MMA fighter at Punchy's gym, but the supposed "bully" is actually a female fighter named Rita Rooney, the reigning MMA champion who is really being nice to him. While trying to help Goomer impress Rita at Punchy's, Sam knocks out Rita in a sparring match, becomes famous, and enters the world of MMA fighting. Sam is slated to engage in a real fight with Rita three weeks later. An aggressive trainer puts Sam through rigorous training, but Sam, known for being lazy and hating work, gets fed up and cancels the fight. Sam's decision prompts Rita to take a break from her career, and she joins Sam and Cat at their apartment, along with others, to watch a film. Absent: Maree Cheatham as Nona
34	"#WeStealARockStar"	Steve Hoefer	Dan Schneider & Christopher J. Nowak	July 12, 2014	135	2.41
For Goomer's new job, he is assigned to be a bodyguard for Del DeVille. When Goomer accidentally tells Sam, Cat, and Dice where Del DeVille always gets lunch they plan to wait for him by the Taco Truck (where he gets lunch). While Goomer gets Del's glasses, Cat ties her big balloon to a little girl's toy scooter, and floats away. Sam sees this and borrows a spear gun to shoot the scooter down, which knocks out Del DeVille. They then take him to their house; when he awakes he decides to call the police so Sam knocks him out a second time. The three tie him to Sam's bed until he promises not to say anything about the incident. After a few days, while Cat is fixing Andre's (her friend from Victorious) guitar she tests it out by playing an eight second snippet, which Del DeVille loves so much he promises not to say anything about what has happened in return for Cat giving him her guitar snippet. Three months later, Del DeVille's new song is famous for Cat's eight second snippet. Another three months later, Del DeVille is being sued $26 million for that eight second snippet, because apparently it was not Cat's original guitar snippet, and it sounded like a song from the 1979 hit by Monkey Dew. Absent: Maree Cheatham as Nona
35	"#GettinWiggy"	Russ Reinsel	Story by : Andrew Thomas; Teleplay by : Dan Schneider & Warren Bell	July 17, 2014	136	3.40
Cat accompanies Dice to a job modeling hair for a cover boy magazine photo shoot in Arizona. Sam asks Nona to stay at her apartment while Cat is away and Nona proves to be a dream roommate, by making lavish dinners, doing Sam's laundry, etc. At the magazine shoot, when another boy named Jet is poised to win the coveted cover photo, Cat becomes convinced he is wearing a wig and she tries to blow it off his head with a large fan. Instead, she makes Jet look even better and he is crowned the magazine's new cover boy. Cat tries to rip his wig off, but he is not wearing a wig and Cat gets arrested. Jet has to go to a scalp hospital and Dice gets the cover instead. Dice asks Sam to send Nona down to Arizona to bail Cat out of the police station before she is there for two weeks. Instead, Sam chooses to have Nona stay around for two more weeks while Cat sits in jail during that time.

== Production ==
=== Development ===
In August 2012, Nickelodeon announced that Dan Schneider, the creator of iCarly and Victorious, would be making a spin-off of both shows called Sam & Cat, starring Jennette McCurdy and Ariana Grande as their respective characters starting a babysitting service together, and ordered the pilot episode. The series was then picked up for 20 episodes in November, with the premiere planned for 2013. In her 2022 memoir I'm Glad My Mom Died, McCurdy revealed that when she entered a development deal to star in the series months earlier, in 2012, the show was planned as Just Puckett, a series following Sam as a school counselor. After she was already attached, the show was redeveloped as a joint spin-off with Grande.

Production began in January 2013, and on June 8, 2013, Sam & Cat premiered in the United States. Several weeks later, on July 11, Nickelodeon doubled the season one order of 20 episodes, to 40. Filming was scheduled to resume in early September 2013 to finish the second half of the first season.

Schneider originally aimed for a March 23, 2013, premiere of Sam & Cat, following the Kids' Choice Awards; however, Nickelodeon intended for the show to make its debut in the fall. On April 18, 2013, the show's two stars Jennette McCurdy and Ariana Grande, via Twitter, announced its premiere was set for June.

=== Controversy and cancellation ===
At the Nickelodeon upfront meeting with advertisers on March 13, 2014, Nickelodeon programming president Russell Hicks stated that Sam & Cat had been renewed for a second season, and Adweek reported that an additional 20 episodes were ordered. However, another Nickelodeon source stated that an official decision was yet to be made on whether the show would be renewed.

In March 2014, McCurdy was the victim of an invasion of privacy when selfies of her in her underwear she had sent her ex-boyfriend while they were dating surfaced online. The same month, she pulled out of the 2014 Kids' Choice Awards, where Sam & Cat won "Favorite Show" and Grande won "Favorite Actress". McCurdy claimed that her sole reason for not attending was "unfair treatment" by Nickelodeon.

On April 2, Deadline Hollywood reported that behind-the-scenes issues had derailed the network's plan for a second season. In addition, it was reported that both actresses felt "constricted" and were ready to move on from the network. While Nickelodeon attributed the hiatus to the large episode order, Deadline provided an update the following day that the crew had been let go. While Deadline reported that McCurdy and Grande were getting along fine, other outlets began reporting that Nickelodeon had paid Grande more than McCurdy, which was denied by Grande.

In July 2014, Nickelodeon released a promo stating two episodes remained to air. On July 13, Nickelodeon announced that they would not be producing any more episodes of Sam & Cat; only 36 episodes of the 40-episode order had been produced. Media outlets attributed the cancellation to several factors: a salary dispute between McCurdy and Nickelodeon; an alleged feud between McCurdy and Grande; the leak of racy photographs of McCurdy; the rising music career of Grande; and both actresses' desires to move on to other projects. The final episode aired four days later, as a lead-in to the inaugural Kids' Choice Sports ceremony.

For months in between, rumors of a feud between Grande and McCurdy ran high, and continued to after the series' cancellation. McCurdy stated in a 2015 interview with E! Online:

I just feel that Ariana and I were and are extremely close and extremely like-minded in a lot of different ways, and then sort of as the show dissolved everybody wanted to find some sort of hidden meaning in our relationship and some like drama, and I think we butted heads at times but in a very sisterly way. Like she knows me so well and I know her so well that I think it was unfortunate that things got misconstrued.

In her 2022 memoir I'm Glad My Mom Died, McCurdy claimed she became jealous of Grande – whose role was inserted to a show McCurdy was meant to be headlining herself – because Nickelodeon allowed Grande to pursue other opportunities, while she was denied such. In particular she cites the episode "#StuckInABox", which she claims was shot without Grande due to her music commitments. McCurdy also claims that she was to direct an episode, which went unrealized because a senior crew member threatened to quit if she did. McCurdy claimed the hiatus and cancellation came unexpectedly, as production was shut down due to a sexual harassment claim against one of the producers.

== Broadcast ==
The series airs on Nickelodeon worldwide. It premiered in Canada on August 12, 2013, on YTV and on September 7, 2013, on the original channel. The show previewed on September 1, 2013, and premiered on October 14, 2013, in the United Kingdom and Ireland. It previewed on September 30, 2013, and premiered on October 7, 2013, and October 11, 2013, in New Zealand and Australia, respectively. In Southeast Asia it started airing on October 19, 2013.

Sam & Cat: The Complete Series, containing all 35 episodes, was released on DVD exclusive to Amazon in region 1 on October 8, 2015.

== Reception ==
=== Critical response ===
Robert Lloyd of the Los Angeles Times states: "There is something at once endearing and annoying about the series, in which sense it is very like the demographic it has been designed to entertain and serve." Paul Asay of Plugged In states that "unlike so many other kids' shows, we don't learn many lessons here, and episodes are apt to end with just another giggle or gag".

Emily Ashby of Common Sense Media rated the series two-out-of-five stars, stating that "Sam & Cat's clever pairing of two previously unrelated characters makes for a unique enough spin-off, but save for the star power of its two poster girls, the show greatly underwhelms." Amy Foster of HelloGiggles states: "I am not a fan of the live action Nick or Disney Shows, period. I think there is a lot wrong with them. Because I have a 15-year-old and a 10-year-old, I've seen 'em all, and Sam & Cat is the worst. Personally, I say give me SpongeBob any day."

=== Ratings ===
The pilot episode debuted on Nickelodeon June 8, 2013, to an audience of 4.2 million viewers. The second episode, one week later, drew 2.6 million viewers. The most watched episode is "#TheKillerTunaJump: #Freddie #Jade #Robbie", which aired January 18, 2014, to 4.8 million viewers; the second most watched episode is the pilot (4.2 million), while the least watched is "#SecretSafe" (2.0 million, on October 5, 2013). In the United Kingdom the series premiere delivered 340,000 viewers, the most for that week. The Halloween episode (#DollSitting) premiere on October 26, 2013, brought 210,000 viewers staying in the same place.

=== Awards and nominations ===
Year	Association	Category	Nominee	Result	Ref.
2014	Nickelodeon Kids' Choice Awards	Favorite TV Show	Sam & Cat	Won	
2014	Teen Choice Awards	Choice Comedy TV Show	Sam & Cat	Nominated	
2014	Kids' Choice Awards Colombia	International Program Favorite	Sam & Cat	Nominated	
2014	Kids' Choice Awards Mexico	International Program Favorite	Sam & Cat	Won	
2014	Kids' Choice Awards Argentina	International Program Favorite	Sam & Cat	Nominated	
2014	Meus Prêmios Nick	Favorite TV Series	Sam & Cat	Won	
2020	Meus Prêmios Nick	Favorite Nickelodeon TV Show	Sam & Cat	Nominated	
