= List of Zoey 101 characters =

This is a list of characters from the Nickelodeon comedy-drama Zoey 101, an American television series which originally aired on Nickelodeon from January 9, 2005, until May 2, 2008. Zoey 101 was created by Dan Schneider, who also serves as executive producer.

== Main characters ==
Actor	Character	Seasons				
Actor	Character	1	2	3	4	Zoey 102
Jamie Lynn Spears	Zoey Brooks	Main	Main	Main	Main	Main
Paul Butcher	Dustin Brooks	Main	Main	Main	Main	Mentioned
Sean Flynn	Chase Matthews	Main	Main	Main	Guest	Main
Kristin Herrera	Dana Cruz	Main	Mentioned		Archive	Mentioned
Christopher Massey	Michael Barret	Main	Main	Main	Main	Main
Alexa Nikolas	Nicole Bristow	Main	Main	Mentioned	Archive	
Erin Sanders	Quinn Pensky	Main	Main	Main	Main	Main
Matthew Underwood	Logan Reese	Main	Main	Main	Main	Main
Victoria Justice	Lola Martinez		Main	Main	Main	Photograph
Austin Butler	James Garrett				Main	Photograph

=== Zoey Brooks ===
Zoey Brooks
- First appearance: "Welcome to PCA" (2005)
- Last appearance: "Zoey 102" (2023)
- Created by: Dan Schneider
- Portrayed by: Jamie Lynn Spears

In-universe information
- Gender: Female
- Occupation: Student (formerly); TV Producer (Zoey 102)
- Family: Mr. Brooks (father); Mrs. Brooks (mother); Dustin Brooks (brother)
- Significant others: Chase Matthews (boyfriend); James Garrett (ex-boyfriend); Todd "Hugo Hemsworth" (fake former boyfriend)

Zoey Jade Brooks (Jamie Lynn Spears) is the main character in the series. Zoey is the older sister of Dustin Brooks and the roommate and best friend of Dana Cruz (Season 1) Nicole Bristow (Seasons 1–2) Lola Martinez (Season 2 onwards) and Quinn Pensky; she is also the best female friend of Chase Matthews. Her other friends include Michael Barrett, Logan Reese, and James Garrett. Zoey enjoys basketball and designing clothes. She is also quite good at playing disc golf and acting and owns a pink Jet-X scooter.

In "Goodbye Zoey?" (the third season), she moves to Covington, a preparatory school in London, England, while her dad works there. She later returns to PCA to tell Chase her true feelings after overhearing him tell Michael and Logan that he misses and loves her, but Chase has already transferred to Covington to be with Zoey. They try to date via webcam but decide that it would not work out and that they would have to wait until Chase returns to PCA after a whole semester.

While Chase is in London, Zoey moves on and begins to date new student and Logan and Michael's new roommate, James Garrett, and, before prom, he tells her that he loves her. Zoey, who is unsure of her feelings, decides to break up with him, though they remain friends. After a long wait, Zoey and Chase share their long-awaited first kiss and officially become a couple in the series finale "Chasing Zoey."

In Zoey 102, Zoey is now a single, 32-year-old, struggling TV producer for a reality series called "LOVE: Fully Charged". She reunites with most of her old friends from PCA at Quinn and Logan's wedding (for which she is the maid of honor), including those two, Chase, Michael, Stacey, and Mark. Things between Zoey and Chase are tense, the reason being that the two were supposed to embark on a romantic getaway in Hawaii after high school, but Zoey was nervous of things between them failing again and bailed on him, leading to their subsequent breakup and lack of contact for the next 15 years. Zoey apologizes and the two warm up to each other, eventually revealing that they have both maintained feelings for each other after all these years. They kiss and end up getting back together.

=== Dustin Brooks ===
Dustin Brooks
- First appearance: "Welcome to PCA" (2005)
- Last appearance: "Chasing Zoey" (2008)
- Created by: Dan Schneider
- Portrayed by: Paul Butcher

In-universe information
- Gender: Male
- Occupation: Student
- Family: Mr. Brooks (father); Mrs. Brooks (mother); Zoey Brooks (sister); 4 Children (Zoey 102)
- Significant others: Trisha Kirby (girlfriend, 1 episode); Sandy Baldwin (girlfriend, 1 episode)

Dustin Brooks (Paul Butcher) is Zoey's younger brother. Besides being his fiercest protector and closest confidante, Zoey becomes her brother's classmate at the newly co-ed PCA. As a child prodigy, Dustin enjoys sharing an eighth-grade geometry class with his equally savvy elder sister. He also helps Quinn Pensky with her scientific experiments when he's not talking his way in and out of sticky situations.

Whenever Dustin gets in over his head, Zoey is always the first one to rush to her brother's aid. Although her protective behavior gets on Dustin's nerves from time to time, he loves Zoey too much to hold that against her. In the season 2 episode "Bad Girl", Dustin dates a girl named Trisha Kirby. By Season 3, not only is Dustin friends with all of the main characters, but he also spends much time with children closer to his age. When Zoey moves with their parents to London, Dustin stays at PCA. In the TV movie "Chasing Zoey," he goes to the prom with Quinn but storms out when he thinks he is being used and disappears afterward. In an alternative ending: Quinn apologizes to him, and Dustin later dances with an unknown girl.

Dustin did not appear in Zoey 102, though he was mentioned by Zoey to now be married with children.

=== Chase Matthews ===
Chase Matthews
- First appearance: "Welcome to PCA" (2005)
- Last appearance: "Zoey 102" (2023)
- Created by: Dan Schneider
- Portrayed by: Sean Flynn

In-universe information
- Gender: Male
- Occupation: Student; Sushi Rox restaurant (seasons 1–3); Elementary School Teacher (Zoey 102)
- Family: Grandpa Matthews; Grandma Matthews (deceased)
- Significant others: Zoey Brooks (girlfriend); Rebecca (ex-girlfriend); Alyssa (ex-fiancé) (10th anniversary clip); Danielle (ex-girlfriend) (Zoey 102)

Chase Bartholomew Matthews (Sean Flynn) is the main male character in Zoey 101 and the first person that Zoey meets at PCA. He is from Baltimore. His birthday is October 5th. A running gag is that people will make fun of Chase's bushy hair. Chase has a "secret" crush on Zoey, but he is too afraid to tell her. He is known to be very clumsy, usually falling down stairs. It was revealed in the episode "Favor Chain" that Chase has an encyclopedic knowledge of all things having to do with comic books. Chase has a dog named Chester, mentioned only once in the episode "Lola Likes Chase." Chase has shown to be very gullible, as seen in "New Roomies", where, to win a game of foosball, Zoey tells him to “look at that huge hamster”, and "Quarantine" when he believes that everyone died of Quinn's germ.

He works at PCA's Sushi Rox restaurant for the first three seasons. He is frequently seen carrying a guitar, a reference to his actor Sean Flynn being an avid guitar player. Chase's crush on Zoey strengthens between Seasons 2 and 3, and at the same time, there are hints that Zoey also has a slight crush on Chase. However, Chase decides to hold back his feelings for her when he thinks he and Zoey are just meant to be friends.

In the TV movie "Goodbye Zoey?", Zoey is offered a chance to go to London with her parents and attend Covington Preparatory School, but she wants to ask Chase about it. However, he overhears rumors that she had already decided to go without talking with him. This hurts him, so he acts very bitter when Zoey comes to talk with him. He sarcastically convinces her she should go and he does not say goodbye to Zoey when she leaves.

Chase learns from Michael about how much Zoey cared about his opinion and regrets his actions. Chase soon begins hanging out with a girl named Gretchen, who looks like Zoey but has an opposite personality. Logan and Michael finally talk to Chase about it and he finally admits to missing Zoey, as well as to being in love with her. Due to a webcam malfunction, Zoey overhears and learns of his feelings for her. This leads to Chase moving to Covington so he can be with her, exactly at the same time that Zoey moves back to PCA so she can be with him. They talk to each other via video chat, and decide to go on a video chat "date", but it does not work out at all, due to a malfunction with the video chat. They decide to put off their relationship until Chase returns from England. Chase has a roommate at Covington named Colin (Benjamin Diskin).

In the series' final episode, "Zoey 101: Chasing Zoey", Chase returns to PCA, and he and Zoey kiss. Later, it is revealed that they have become a couple and they spend the summer together in Hawaii.

On September 18, 2015, a video aired on TeenNick that reveals what Zoey said about Chase on a DVD in the episode "Time Capsule" (which aired on the same day in 2005). Chase and Zoey are no longer dating as Chase is seen proposing to a girlfriend named Alyssa. Before he can finish the proposal, Michael bursts into the restaurant and reveals he has dug up the time capsule to retrieve Zoey's DVD. Although Chase had forgotten, Michael reminds him that Zoey promised to tell him in 10 years what she said about him on the DVD, so he did not have to wait 20 years for the scheduled time capsule opening. Since they could not watch the video without a DVD player, Michael instead wrote down what Zoey said and reads it to Chase. Zoey said she really cares for Chase but suspects that he has a crush on her, reveals that the feeling may be mutual and thinks Chase might even be her soulmate. Chase happily thanks Michael, takes back the engagement ring, and excitedly exits the restaurant to find Zoey.

In Zoey 102, Chase is now an elementary school teacher and has a new girlfriend named Danielle. He reunites with Zoey and many other PCA alumni at Quinn and Logan's wedding (for which he is the best man), and things between him and Zoey are tense due to her ditching him on a vacation in Hawaii after high school, which led to their breakup and subsequent lack of contact for the next 15 years. However, after admitting that he and Danielle had actually broken up weeks before the wedding, he and Zoey eventually warm up to each other, profess their persisted love for one another, share a few kisses, and end up getting back together.

=== Dana Cruz ===
Dana Cruz
- First appearance: "Welcome to PCA" (2005)
- Last appearance: "Little Beach Party" (2005)
- Created by: Dan Schneider
- Portrayed by: Kristin Herrera

In-universe information
- Gender: Female
- Occupation: Student

Dana Cruz (Kristin Herrera) is one of Zoey's roommates who appears only in Season 1. Dana is a tomboy and good at sports, particularly basketball and skateboarding. She also loves to sleep, hates to wake up, and considers mankind's greatest invention to be the snooze button on her alarm clock. Dana frequently argues with her roommate Nicole Bristow.

Dana's confrontational attitude is comparable to that of Logan Reese, whom she could not stand, although both have quite a bit in common and went to a school dance together. Dana has a strong-willed personality and will often try to do things herself, as shown in the episode "Jet X." She tends to be thuggish, very aggressive, and lazy. Dana can be devious and knows how to mess with Logan.

In Season 2, Dana accepted a European student exchange program to study in Paris, leaving the rest of the series. She was initially written to be Logan's girlfriend, but the role was given to Quinn Pensky. Dana appeared in a total of thirteen episodes, all in Season 1. In "The PCA Survival Guide," her name is mistakenly Dana Ramsey. She is a slob according to Nicole but she can sometimes be sweet. It's unknown if Zoey or anyone else at PCA kept in contact with her afterward. She appeared on "PCA Confidential" but only in flashbacks.

The character was written off the series after Nickelodeon thought that Herrera looked too old for the part. Dana has the second-fewest appearances of all the main characters in the series, present for all of Season 1 and not seen again.

Dana did not appear in Zoey 102, though her name was mentioned when Danielle, Chase's new girlfriend, mistook Zoey for her.

=== Michael Barret ===
Michael Barret
- First appearance: "Welcome to PCA" (2005)
- Last appearance: "Zoey 102" (2023)
- Created by: Dan Schneider
- Portrayed by: Christopher Massey

In-universe information
- Gender: Male
- Occupation: Student (formerly); Music Producer (Zoey 102)

Michael Barret (Christopher Massey) is Logan and Chase's roommate and best friend. Michael is a natural athlete who plays the flute. He and Logan regularly urge Chase to open up about his feelings for Zoey. Michael gets along with practically everyone at PCA. He is a very loyal and supportive friend who loves to make people laugh (he once became obsessed with making Quinn laugh when he found out that she doesn't think he's funny).

He also had a web show with Chase, called The Chase and Michael Show, which was said to be watched by only nine students at PCA initially and was cancelled for a short time by Dean Rivers in the Season 2 episode "Broadcast Views". Michael is a good singer, when he is not in front of girls he likes. He is also sometimes the test subject of Quinn's science projects. Michael likes to play with his Clackers, a toy which everybody else hates. On several occasions, when he does not wish for a certain course of action to be taken, he babbles that, "You can't—!" Someone then usually does what he said could not be done, causing him to respond by saying, "He/She just—!"

In Season 3's "Drippin' Episode", he coins a slang word, "Drippin", and neither Chase nor Logan credit him. In the Season 4 episode "Rollercoaster", it is revealed that Michael has an immense fear of roller coasters, a secret that Logan spreads around campus, much to Michael's humiliation. Zoey convinces Michael to go on a coaster at a local theme park he is afraid of initially, and he learns to love riding them. Lisa becomes his girlfriend, who is also friends with Zoey. His father gives him a stick-shift car to drive Lisa to the prom.

Michael has the second-most appearances in the show, after Zoey.

Michael appeared in the short video called "What did Zoey Say?" (released in 2015), where he gave Chase the CD that contained what Zoey had said about him ten years prior.

In Zoey 102, Michael is now a successful rap producer. He reunites with many of his fellow PCA alumni at Quinn and Logan's wedding, for which he is the officiator, though Stacey takes over the role when Michael loses his voice. He also reveals at the end of the movie that he wrote a song inspired by the slang word, "drippin'", that he made up in the aforementioned "Drippin' Episode".

=== Nicole Bristow ===
Nicole Bristow
- First appearance: "Welcome to PCA" (2005)
- Last appearance: "Quinn's Alpaca" (2006)
- Created by: Dan Schneider
- Portrayed by: Alexa Nikolas

In-universe information
- Gender: Female
- Occupation: Student

Nicole Bristow (Alexa Nikolas) is a student at PCA and originally from Kansas, where her father owns a juice company. She is the second friend Zoey makes at PCA and one of her roommates in the first two seasons. Nicole admires Zoey for her good ideas when she needs help. She is "boy-crazy" and bad at sports, particularly disc golf and basketball. Nicole is a typical girly girl who can be a little ditzy yet very sensitive. She feared the thought of new roommates after her rivalry with Dana Cruz (Season 1) but got along with Lola Martinez (Season 2).

In Season 2, Nicole is revealed to be a straight-A student who gets distracted by the cute boys in her class; until Quinn, and Lola hypnotize her to only see boys as her grandfather. She is later sent to an all-girls school after being diagnosed with "Obsessive Male Gender Disorder" (OMGD) as revealed in the Season 3 premiere "Surprise". She is never seen again, and Quinn replaces her as Zoey and Lola's new roommate. Nicole is mentioned several times throughout Season 3, but not in Season 4. It is also never revealed whether Zoey or anyone else at PCA remained in contact with her afterward. She appears in all 26 episodes of Seasons 1 and 2. She also appeared in flashbacks in the episode "PCA Confidential".

Nicole was written out of the show after Season 2 following the departure of her actor Alexa Nikolas. Although for years it was reported that Nikolas was fired, Nikolas claimed in a 2019 interview that she had quit, and alleged abuse and bullying by the cast and creative team.

Nicole did not appear in Zoey 102, nor was she mentioned or referenced.

=== Quinn Pensky ===
Quinn Pensky
- First appearance: "Welcome to PCA" (2005)
- Last appearance: "Zoey 102" (2023)
- Created by: Dan Schneider
- Portrayed by: Erin Sanders

In-universe information
- Gender: Female
- Occupation: Student (formerly); Inventor (Zoey 102)
- Significant others: Logan Reese (married, in love with, series) (husband, film); Mark Del Figgalo (ex-boyfriend)

Quinn Maria Pensky (later Pensky-Reese) (Erin Sanders) is an intelligent girl and one of Lola and Zoey's best friends. She is from Seattle, Washington. She is best known for working on crazy experiments (referring to them as "Quinnventions"), so other students think she is a freak. Quinn is curious most of the time and is outlandish with her experiments. Quinn overlooks the dangers of most of her experiments, which almost always tend to go awry. Examples include a breath spray that causes uncontrollable laughter, an excessive hair-growth formula, or a humane mouse trap that shoots a plasma bolt that knocks people unconscious.

Quinn plays the trombone and has six toes on her right foot, as revealed in the Season 1 episode "Quinn's Date." In the Season 2 episode "Quinn's Alpaca," it is revealed she has a pet alpaca named "Otis" back in her hometown. She also has a pet rat, a spider named "Herman," and a snake named "Marvin." For the first two seasons, Quinn lived by herself. She only once had Zoey as a roommate until they had disagreements. However, Quinn becomes roommates with Zoey and Lola starting in Season 3 after Nicole leaves.

Quinn originally dated Mark Del Figgalo until "Quinn misses the Mark" where they begin to grow apart. At one point, Mark thinks it would be nice to put their relationship on hold, and Quinn dumps him when he starts dating Brooke Margolin.

Quinn also once had many minor conflicts with Logan Reese, but they began dating after her break up with Mark. They keep it a secret out of fear of ridicule, especially when they think Michael might have seen them hug. Logan and Quinn later try to have their first official date at Vaccarro but it is interrupted. Quinn takes Dustin to the PCA prom in "Chasing Zoey," so she does not have to go with Logan and reveal their secret. They finally unveil their relationship, having grown tired of the stress of keeping it a secret, and reveal they are in love with each other at the prom (nobody makes fun of them).

In Zoey 102, Quinn is now a successful inventor, and it is revealed that she and Logan are engaged. They reunite with several other PCA alumni at their wedding, which goes awry at first, but thanks to Zoey's innovative thinking, the ceremony ends up being successful, leading to Quinn and Logan's marriage.

=== Logan Reese ===
Logan Reese
- First appearance: "Welcome to PCA" (2005)
- Last appearance: "Zoey 102" (2023)
- Created by: Dan Schneider
- Portrayed by: Matthew Underwood

In-universe information
- Gender: Male
- Occupation: Student (Formerly); Sushi Rox restaurant (season 1)
- Family: Malcolm Reese (father); Unnamed mother Lyric (sister) Multiple step-mothers
- Significant others: Quinn Pensky (girlfriend, in love with); Wife (sequel film)

Logan Roland Reese (Matthew Underwood) is the rich son of a famous film and TV producer, named Malcolm Reese. A narcissist, Logan likes to take pictures of himself and autograph them to give out to girls at PCA. His dad's finances provide all the boys' dorm room appliances (or whatever Logan might want to buy). He is known for being sexist and especially for his big ego. He is shown to be overly competitive, such as faking a leg injury "Hands on a Blix Van", racing in "Michael loves Lisa", and gaming in "Back to PCA".

Although Logan is typically portrayed as being less intelligent in school, it's revealed in the Season 3 episode "Zoey's Tutor" that he is very gifted in chemistry, smart enough to tutor Zoey. His grandfather, whom he visited every summer as a child, works as a chemistry professor at Caltech. Logan has also exhibited street smarts on many occasions, such as giving the gang clever ideas. He also enjoys being socially/physically active and making out with girls. Many girls are attracted to Logan, but some are turned off by his cocky personality. Earlier seasons portrayed him as having a slight crush on Zoey on numerous occasions until he dates Quinn Pensky, Zoey's best friend and roommate.

In the TV movie, "Spring Break-Up", it's revealed that he has a beach house in Santa Barbara. Despite his cockiness, he continues to be good friends with Chase and Michael. However, unlike Michael, Logan is not afraid to mock Chase for his crush on Zoey. When Chase tries to replace Zoey with another girl in "Goodbye Zoey?", Logan and Michael have an intervention for Chase. Logan helps Chase admit how much he misses and loves Zoey by ripping the head off a stuffed giraffe Zoey gave him, showing that he does care for Chase and wishes for him to be happy.

Despite constantly annoying Zoey with his egotistical attitude, Logan cares for her too. He saves Zoey from being expelled after she goes too far in a prank against the boys in the episode "Prank Week." Logan stands up to the fighter for being too violent towards her and gets beaten up, showing how far he is willing to go to protect his friends. He and Michael also stand up for Chase in a fight against Vince Blake's gang.

In Season 4, Logan and Quinn begin dating but keep it a secret as he no longer looks for other girls. They try to go to Vaccaro for their first official date but it is interrupted and in the movie Zoey 101: Chasing Zoey, Logan takes Stacey Dillsen to the prom to keep his relationship with Quinn a secret. Logan and Quinn announce their relationship at the prom when Stacey is trying to kiss him and he instantly shouts that he loves Quinn. She returns the message, and they seal their announcement with a kiss.

In Zoey 102, Logan is revealed to have inherited his father's fortune, as well as proposed to Quinn. At their wedding, they reunited with many of their old friends from PCA, and despite hitting a few bumps in the road, the wedding was a success and he and Quinn were married.

=== Lola Martinez ===
Lola Martinez
- First appearance: "Back to PCA" (2005)
- Last appearance: "Chasing Zoey" (2008)
- Created by: Dan Schneider
- Portrayed by: Victoria Justice

In-universe information
- Gender: Female
- Occupation: Student

Lola Samantha Martinez (Victoria Justice) is an aspiring movie star who came to PCA after Dana moved out. She first appears in the Season 2 premiere episode "Back to PCA", becoming Zoey and Nicole's (later Quinn in Season 3) new roommate. Lola first pretends to be a "freaky goth chick" as an acting exercise on her first day at PCA, frightening Zoey and Nicole. However, they later find out the truth in the end. Lola's dream is to become a famous Hollywood actress and win an Oscar award by her 19th birthday. Her true acting talent becomes apparent in "Girls Will Be Boys" when she fools Chase and Logan into thinking she is a boy. She is overly confident in a dream in "Son of a Dean" when she says it is her "destiny" to win a raffle to the premiere of the movie Peaches 'n' Cream.

She can talk in a convincing British accent, as shown in "Dance Contest". Lola is afraid of people in big costumes; due to an accident with a man in a giant hot dog costume when she was younger, as revealed in "Zoey's Balloon".

Lola can also tell if a boy is a good kisser by watching him eat an apple as she identified her crush Leaf, from "Curse of PCA", as one. In the episode "Vince is Back", it is revealed that Lola likes Vince, who returned to PCA after being expelled. She kisses Vince four times after to find out how much he has changed. It is then clear that the two are dating.

In the series finale, "Chasing Zoey", Vince takes Lola out to the prom. The Pacific Coast Academy website mistook her name as Lola Camacho in "Lolascopes".

Lola did not appear in Zoey 102, although her name was mentioned when Danielle, Chase's new girlfriend, mistook Zoey for her. She was also shown in pictures from their time at PCA that Zoey had in her phone.

=== James Garrett ===
James Garrett
- First appearance: "Rumor of Love" (2008)
- Last appearance: "Chasing Zoey" (2008)
- Created by: Dan Schneider; Jeff Bushell
- Portrayed by: Austin Butler

In-universe information
- Gender: Male
- Occupation: Student
- Significant other: Zoey Brooks (ex-girlfriend)

James Xavier Garrett (Austin Butler) is Zoey's ex-boyfriend and Logan and Michael's new roommate. He is originally from Santa Fe, New Mexico. James takes Chase's old bedroom, much to the dismay of Michael and Logan. They make it very clear that they do not want him around and he eventually gets the point and leaves. Logan starts a rumor that James and Zoey are dating. Michael comes to James's new bedroom and apologizes, inviting him back to live with them. The two of them get Logan to admit that the rumor he spread about James and Zoey was untrue. Later in the same episode, James and Zoey kiss and become a couple. James repeatedly helps the girls get back at Logan.

In "Chasing Zoey", James gets Zoey a necklace with an inscription that says, "i love you". She does not talk to him and ends up breaking up with him, saying she loves him but "there's something in the way". They decide to remain friends. In the alternative ending to the final episode, he dances with an unknown girl, implying that he has fallen for someone else and will leave Zoey alone.

James did not appear in Zoey 102, although he was shown in pictures from their time at PCA that Zoey had in her phone.

== Recurring characters ==
Actor	Character	Seasons				
Actor	Character	1	2	3	4	Zoey 102
Jack Salvatore, Jr.	Mark Del Figgalo	Recurring	Recurring	Recurring	Recurring	Main
Christopher Murray	Dean Rivers	Recurring	Recurring	Recurring	Recurring	Mentioned
Jessica Chaffin	Coco Wexler	Recurring	Recurring	Recurring	Recurring	Mentioned
Miki Ishikawa	Vicky	Recurring				
Michael Blieden	David H. Bender	Recurring	Recurring			
Brian Tee	Kazu	Guest	Guest	Recurring	Recurring	Mentioned
Creagen Dow	Jeremiah Trotman		Recurring	Recurring	Recurring	
Allen Evangelista	Wayne Gilbert		Recurring	Recurring	Recurring	
Abby Wilde	Stacey Dillsen			Recurring	Recurring	Main
Daniella Monet	Rebecca Martin			Recurring		
Brando Eaton	Vince Blake			Guest	Recurring	

=== PCA students ===
==== Mark Del Figgalo ====
Mark Del Figgalo
- First appearance: "New Roomies" (2005)
- Last appearance: "Zoey 102" (2023)
- Created by: Steve Holland
- Portrayed by: Jack Salvatore Jr.

In-universe information
- Gender: Male
- Occupation: Student (Formerly); Murder Podcast Field Producer (Zoey 102)
- Significant others: Quinn Pensky (ex-girlfriend); Stacey Dillsen (Wife)

Mark Del Figgalo (Jack Salvatore, Jr.) is Quinn's ex-boyfriend. Before he and Quinn broke up, he was involved with most of her experiments. Mark made cameos throughout Season 1, making his first appearance in "New Roomies" as Dustin's student. He made his only major appearance in "Quinn's Date", and became Quinn's boyfriend after the episode. He has no emotions and is portrayed as being very boring, although he does smile sometimes, but not often. According to Quinn; he is very cute and dreamy, but to Zoey and her roommates, Dana, Nicole and Lola, he is not cute at all. He kissed Quinn several times; however, the first time they kissed was in "The Radio", two years after they started dating. He loves salami and likes plain (no butter, sour cream, etc.) baked potatoes; he is lactose intolerant. Mark also collects rocks, as shown in some of the later episodes. In "Quinn Misses the Mark", he breaks up with Quinn and dates a girl, named Brooke; who dumps him because he is not exciting. Michael, Logan, Chase and sometimes Zoey usually just call him by his last name, "Del Figgalo", whereas Quinn and Lola usually call him "Mark". Michael and Logan also sometimes call him "Del Figgs". Mark collects antique calendars and likes to knit. The girls Mark has dated are: Courtney (Season 1), Quinn Pensky (Seasons 1–4), Brooke Margolin (Season 4), and Stacey Dillsen as he is seen dancing with her at the end of "Chasing Zoey" (Season 4).

Mark appears in 20 out of 65 episodes throughout the series.

In Zoey 102, Mark is revealed to have married Stacey, and become the field producer for her popular murder podcast. He reunites with several PCA alumni at Quinn and Logan's wedding. Mark pursues a lead that suggests that Todd, Zoey's fake boyfriend, is a serial killer, but he and Stacey are led to believe that the lead was bogus (when, unbeknownst to them, it was actually legitimate).

==== Stacey Dillsen ====
Stacey Dillsen
- First appearance: "Chase's Girlfriend" (2006)
- Last appearance: "Zoey 102" (2023)
- Created by: Steve Holland
- Portrayed by: Abby Wilde

In-universe information
- Alias: Bow Girl
- Gender: Female
- Occupation: Student (Formerly); Murder Podcast Host (Zoey 102)
- Significant other: Mark Del Figgalo (Husband)

Stacey Dillsen (Abby Wilde) is a student at PCA. She has a very noticeable lisp. She has an obsession with cotton swabs and white glue, using it in different arts and crafts, and she sings a song; "you can sip it in the morning, sip it in the evening, even at a quarter to three, "'cause i like sassafras, you like sassafras, we like sassafras tea!".

Stacey has a crush on Logan Reese because of his muscular physique and frequently calls him "hot and spicy", although this repulses and irritates Logan. Stacey briefly becomes the roommate of Lola and Quinn in "Goodbye Zoey?", after Zoey leaves to go to a boarding school in London.

In "Chasing Zoey", Logan (Quinn's secret boyfriend) asks Stacey to prom, so nobody would suspect that he and Quinn were dating. While Michael tries to teach Mark how to drive a stick shift, Mark accidentally hits Stacey, causing her to lose her lisp; which allows her to speak well.

Stacey began as a recurring character in Season 3 and was present in 31 of the 39 combined episodes making up Seasons 3 and 4. Unlike several other main characters, Stacey appears in the episode "PCA Confidential" and not just in the flashbacks from past episodes.

Stacey's character has made cameos (where her lisp "relapses") throughout iCarly and Sam & Cat; such as two appearances in Season 4 of iCarly ("iStart a Fan War" and "iHire an Idiot". Stacey appears in a hospital on Sam & Cat after a bike accident. Later, it is revealed that she graduated from PCA several years ago and is a sophomore at San Francisco State University. However, it is unknown if any of this information is canon to the Zoey 101 timeline; implying that her lisp has gone.

In Zoey 102, Stacey is revealed to have created a popular murder podcast, with Mark, her husband, as her field producer. She reunites with several PCA alumni at Quinn and Logan's wedding, and takes Michael's place as the officiator when he loses his voice. Stacey and Mark receive evidence that suggests that Todd, Zoey's pretend-boyfriend, is a murderer that they had been searching for, which, little do they know, he is. Like at the end of "Chasing Zoey," Stacey is once again portrayed without a lisp.

==== Jeremiah Trotman ====
Jeremiah Trotman (Creagen Dow) is the school anchorman (who does the PCA news); who reports on all the happenings around PCA. He takes his job very seriously, and can always be spotted wearing his trademark orange Converse as part of his anchorman attire. After most of his broadcasts, he pauses, then says "courage". In "Chasing Zoey", he sees Zoey alone and is interested in taking her to the prom, even if he has to get "rid" of his date, Martha. He plans on leaving school after graduation to head to New York with hopes of becoming a network news anchor.

Jeremiah appeared in 14 episodes of Zoey 101, making his first appearance as a recurring character in the Season 2 episode "Election." Jeremiah also makes an appearance in the Season 2 episode "Robot Wars", in the Season 3 episodes "Hot Dean", "Quarantine", "Wrestling", "Son of the Dean", and "Goodbye Zoey: Part 1" and "Goodbye Zoey: Part 2", and in the Season 4 episodes "Rumor of Love", "Anger Management", "Quinn Misses the Mark", "Walk-a-Thon", and "Chasing Zoey: Part 1" and "Chasing Zoey: Part 2".

==== Vincent "Vince" Blake ====
Vincent "Vince" Blake (Brando Eaton) first appeared in "The Great Vince Blake", and he is a star football player; who is supposed to be the best high school quarterback on the planet. He is very popular at PCA, a "chick magnet", and a hero who many other guys look up to. Chase seems to be the only one bothered by Vince's special attention and popularity. However, Vince is discovered to be very dishonest, when Chase catches him cheating on a test. Chase turns him in, causing Vince to be put on academic probation. Enraged, he rounds up the football team and beats up Chase, along with Michael, Logan and Mark Del Figgalo, who stand against them with Chase. Henceforth, Vince is expelled from PCA.

Vince comes back in "Vince Is Back", and appears to have had a change of heart. The guys want revenge on Vince for beating them up while the girls decide to just ignore him. However, he and Lola have the same yoga class, and while she tries to ignore him, she can not resist how nice he has actually become and ends up kissing him four times; they later become a couple. Eventually Zoey, Quinn, Logan and Michael forgive him, and they all become friends with him. It is unclear if Chase ever forgives him; Chase does not react to Vince at the end of "Chasing Zoey", when Chase comes back from England. Vince makes his final appearance in "Chasing Zoey", taking Lola to the prom.

==== Lisa Perkins ====
Lisa Perkins (Lisa Tucker) is Michael's girlfriend throughout Seasons 3 and 4. She first appears in "Michael Loves Lisa" and becomes Michael's girlfriend. Before dating Michael, she dated another boy, who ran away in fear when Chase's go-kart went out of control during Lisa and her boyfriend's picnic. She appears again in the episode "Hands on a Blix Van," breaking up and reuniting with Michael after he makes fun of her necklace, thinking that it is a necklace that Lisa, herself, said was horrible. She then appears in the final two episodes of the series, "Roller Coaster" and "Chasing Zoey."

==== Wayne "Firewire" Gilbert ====
Wayne "Firewire" Gilbert (Allen Evangelista) is a tech geek in the science club. In "Robot Wars", his name is revealed to be Wayne Gilbert, and he gets upset when they do not call him "Firewire". He works on a robot which exceeds the maximum height of 36 inches, and therefore; has to use the robot without its 39-inch tall "hammer". He appears again helping Rebecca get revenge on Zoey, and also helps Michael and Logan to get revenge on Vince. He wants to be Ryan Seacrest. Quinn hates him, because he and his two friends Neil and Andrew (from "Robot Wars") would not let her join the science club, because she is a girl. His last appearance is in "Chasing Zoey", when he and his friends think the world is ending and run into the woods for safety, returning when they hear that Zoey is not going to the dance.

==== Rebecca Martin ====
Rebecca Martin (Daniella Monet) is Chase's girlfriend at the start of Season 3. However, they break up because Rebecca hates Zoey and tries to tell Chase to stay away from her. Later in the episode "Zoey's Balloon" as revenge, Rebecca threatens to embarrass Zoey if she does not do whatever Rebecca says, such as wearing a banana costume and dancing "The Macalana" (a parody of the "Macarena", a song by Los del Rio) however, Zoey and her friends manage to thwart Rebecca. She was probably permanently expelled from the PCA for blackmailing Zoey. Rebecca only appears in Season 3.

==== Brooke Margolin ====
Brooke Margolin (Mariah Buzolin) becomes Mark's girlfriend. Mark breaks up with Quinn, finding he and Brooke share several common interests. Brooke is seen in three episodes of Season 4. Logan said that Brooke was "hot" when Quinn told Logan that Mark fell in love with Brooke. Brooke dumped Mark at the end of the Zoey 101 movie "Chasing Zoey", because he was not exciting.

==== Gretchen ====
Gretchen (Madison Riley) is a slob and a do-nothing. According to Logan, she is Chase's Zoey replacement and is only seen in "Goodbye Zoey?". Lola, Quinn, Michael and Logan all hate her. Chase hangs out with her to get his mind off Zoey since Zoey left PCA (yet she even looks like Zoey). Gretchen is seen doing several disgusting things, such as digging in her nose, scratching her armpits, spitting and popping her zits at lunch. She randomly takes a bite out of Quinn's apple and leaves her gum on it. All of this is considered gross by Lola, Quinn, Michael and Logan, but Chase does not seem to notice, wanting to believe her to be just like Zoey. Eventually, he admits the truth. Despite the similar appearances, Gretchen and Zoey have many opposite characteristics.

==== Vicky ====
Vicky (Miki Ishikawa) is a recurring character in Season 1. Vicky is an Asian-American girl, who spoke to Zoey on numerous occasions.

=== Adults ===
==== Coco Wexler ====
Coco Wexler (Jessica Chaffin) is the girls' dorm advisor, who is sensitive and a crybaby. She is often seen eating canned ravioli and is an emotional wreck half the time. She breaks up and gets back together with her boyfriend Carl on almost a weekly basis and during the break-ups, she is seen crying and venting to students, mainly the girls. In one episode, a new dean appears during her breakup, so Zoey and her roommates set Coco up on a date with him and things turn shaky when Coco's ex-boyfriend Carl finds out. When she gets nervous, she sweats a lot, as revealed in the episode "Hot Dean".

Coco later makes a surprise cameo in the Sam & Cat episode "#FirstClassProblems" where she sits next to Sam & Cat who are waiting to board their flight to the Bahamas. While they wait, Coco reveals that she married Carl, but later got divorced and that Carl is planning to marry Coco's mother in the Bahamas.

Coco did not appear in Zoey 102, although her name was mentioned when Danielle, Chase's new girlfriend, mistook Zoey for her.

==== Charles W. Rivers ====
Charles W. Rivers (Christopher Murray) is the Dean of PCA. He is married to his overbearing wife and spends a lot of money on video games. He and Zoey often have different ideas on things, like vending machines. His full name, as shown in "Spring Fling," was "Charles W. Rivers" which appears on a sign next to Dana and is seen after the girls ask Dean Rivers about putting up a fundraiser. However, in "Quinn's Alpaca", his wife calls him "Carl". He likes lions, but was attacked by one in "Fake Roommate". He was also a student at PCA, and it is revealed he won the PCA golf tournament when he was a senior.

Dean Rivers did not appear in Zoey 102, although it was revealed that he had been caught embezzling tuition money from PCA students, which ultimately led to the school shutting down.

==== Kazu ====
Kazu (Brian Tee) is a Japanese-American from Alabama. He is the manager of PCA's restaurant Sushi Rox, which is accidentally burned down but later rebuilt. He makes his first appearance in "Webcam". He later appears in "People Auction" and "Hot Dean", and makes cameo appearances in "Quarantine" and "Quinn Misses the Mark".

In Zoey 102, it is revealed that Sushi Rox had closed down for good after PCA was shut down. Kazu was revealed to have a son with his own sushi food truck, who catered Quinn and Logan's wedding at PCA.

==== Margeret Crocker ====
Margeret Crocker (Carla Renata) appears in Seasons 3 and 4 and replaces Francine Krutcher, who is in Seasons 1–2. She is seen several times taking care of Zoey and Michael and takes care of Zoey in "The Curse of PCA."

==== Francine Krutcher ====
Francine Krutcher (Diane Delano) is the nurse at PCA in Seasons 1–2. She is very mean and does not let the sick or hurt PCA students leave. In the Season 1 episode, "The Play", it is revealed she can be violent and is seen pouncing on and dragging the sick students, such as the scene where Chase tries to escape to keep Zoey from kissing Logan. In "Girls Will Be Boys", it is revealed that she has a husband, who is in prison.

==== Mr. Takato ====
Takato (James Hong) is an old man who teaches Michael how to drive a stick shift in "Chasing Zoey". He says that he is a lower school math teacher, but no one else had heard of him. At the end of the movie, he appears before Michael one final time, mounted atop a Water Buffalo, wearing a rice hat. Michael asks him to come and tell his girlfriend, Lisa that he had taught Michael how to drive a stick shift, but Takato responds by telling Michael that he "does not exist", and rides off into the night, mysteriously vanishing into thin air. Whether or not Mr. Takato is real is unknown.

==== Mr. David H. Bender ====
Mr. David H. Bender (Michael Blieden) is the school's film and tech teacher. David Bender was also a former PCA student and a member of the cheerleading squad. He is a favorite throughout Season 1. In one episode, he helps the group get back to PCA after they visited the wrong beach. He makes appearances in Season 2. In "Chasing Zoey", his name is announced over the loudspeaker at the prom. It is also mentioned in the episode "Favor Chain" that Lola is babysitting his son, while Mr. Bender and his wife go out.

==== Seamus Finnigan ====
Seamus Finnigan is PCA's maintenance man. He was Dean Rivers' former classmate at PCA, where they competed on the golfing team. He does not like Dean Rivers. He only appears in "Alone at PCA", and shares a name with the Harry Potter character.

==== Malcolm Reese ====
Malcolm (Michael Corbett) is Logan's father. Malcolm lives in Santa Barbara, with his assistant, Ciara. He debuts in Spring Break-Up, and is also in "Logan Gets Cut Off". In Zoey 102, it’s revealed that Malcom died and left his entire inheritance to Logan.

==== Ms. Burvich ====
Ms. Burvich (Suzanne Krull) is divorced and assigns rooms at PCA. She appears in Seasons 2-4 and is first seen in "Back to PCA". Nicole breaks Burvich's hard-earned collection of rare perfume bottles, causing Burvich to hold a grudge against Zoey and Nicole and reject their plea to choose their new roommate. Her second appearance is in "Fake Roommate", when Michael and Logan try to trick her into thinking that Chase is still at PCA after he moved to England, because they do not want a new roommate. Her third appearance is in "Rumor of Love" when Burvich introduces Michael and Logan to their new roommate, James Garrett.

== Guest stars ==
=== Paige Howard ===
Paige Howard (Miranda Cosgrove), who appears once in "Paige at PCA", seems to be the smartest young girl on the Pacific coast. She wants to run the whole campus on "Paige Power", to save a lot of energy. Her name also appears in Chase's phone contacts in the episode "Little Beach Party".

=== Stacy ===
Stacy (Allison Scagliotti) is a student at PCA who steals Zoey's backpack idea in the episode "Backpack". Stacy remains Zoey's enemy after the episode.

=== Keith Finch ===
Keith Finch (Erik Walker) only appears in "Defending Dustin". He intimidates Dustin after Dustin corrects Keith's mistake in their math class. He remains Dustin's enemy after the episode.

=== Greg ===
Greg (Stephen Lunsford) is a boy who Lisa Perkins dates. He breaks up with Lisa when she kisses Michael.

=== Leif ===
Leif (Jarron Vosburg) guides everyone to Red Stone Gulch in the Season 3 episode "Curse of PCA." He leads them there, so he can spend more time with Lola because he likes her. Lola and Leif's seemingly constant kissing upsets everyone else. Leif is a senior, and it is said that he graduated but could not get into a good college. He does not appear in any other episode.

=== Lance Rivers ===
Lance Rivers (Ben Perry) is the son of Dean Rivers. He cheats to be able to go to a premiere with Zoey. Lola and Quinn tell Zoey their bad vibe from Lance, but Zoey still goes to the premiere. Zoey later ditches Lance in his limo when she realizes what a jerk he is.

=== Trisha Kirby ===
Trisha Kirby (Jennette McCurdy) is the "bad girl" in Dustin's grade, who has a passion for being crude. She was held back due to failing grades. She dates Dustin in the episode "Bad Girl", and Zoey tries to break the two up.

=== Courtney ===
Courtney (Zoe Keller) is Mark Del Figgalo's ex-girlfriend. Her only appearance is on the Season 1 episode "Quinn's Date", in which she accuses Mark of "cheating" on her, after she caught Mark on a "date" with Quinn Pensky.
