= Erin Sanders =

American actress (born 1991)

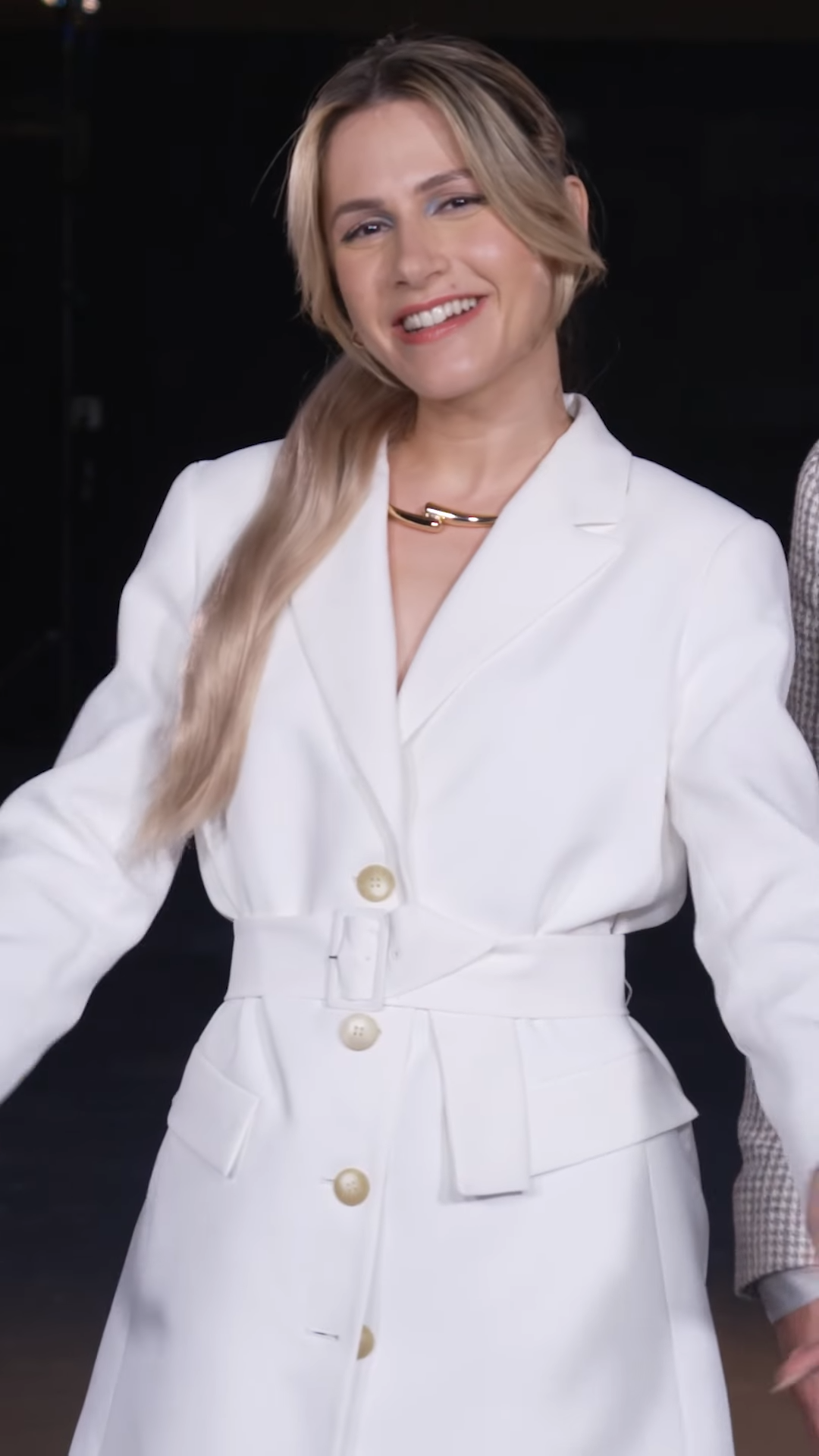
- Sanders in 2023
- Born: Erin Zariah Sanders; January 19, 1991 (age 35); Santa Monica, California, U.S.
- Occupation: Actress
- Years active: 2001–present
- Spouse: Adam Johan (m. 2024)
- Website: erinsanders.com

Erin Zariah Sanders (born January 19, 1991) is an American actress. She is known for her roles as Quinn Pensky on Zoey 101, Camille Roberts on Big Time Rush, and for portraying Eden Baldwin on The Young and the Restless in 2008. She appeared as Chris on ABC Family's Melissa and Joey and starred in the film Guilty at 17, which premiered on Lifetime.

== Early life ==
Sanders was born Erin Zariah Sanders on January 19, 1991 in Santa Monica, California.

== Career ==
At the age of 13, she began her starring role as Quinn Pensky on the Nickelodeon television series Zoey 101. Through all four seasons, Sanders played the resident science genius at Pacific Coast Academy and roommate of Zoey (portrayed by Jamie Lynn Spears). Following Zoey 101, Sanders worked for several months on CBS's The Young and the Restless playing Eden Baldwin, the daughter of Michael Grossman.

In 2014, Sanders played the role of Chris on the third season of the ABC Family comedy Melissa and Joey. She has had guest-starring roles on many other television series, including Mad Men, Weeds, Castle, The Mentalist, and CSI: Miami. Sanders has also had roles in several independent films, and played the lead role of Traci in Guilty at 17 which premiered on Lifetime in 2014.

In 2020, she appeared in an episode of the Nickelodeon sketch comedy series All That in a sketch with many of her Zoey 101 co-stars. On January 12, 2023, Jamie Lynn Spears announced that production had begun on a sequel film, entitled Zoey 102, set to premiere in 2023 on Paramount+, with original series cast members Spears, Sanders, Sean Flynn, Christopher Massey, and Matthew Underwood reprising their roles from Zoey 101. The film was released on July 27, 2023 on Paramount+.

She also works as a yoga and meditation instructor, and leads classes over Zoom.

== Personal life ==
Sanders has stated that she is Jewish. She is bisexual. In 2023, she was dating music producer Adam Johan, according to People magazine. On October 10, 2024, Sanders revealed that she and Johan had married on September 17, 2024.

== Filmography ==
=== Film ===
Year	Title	Role	Notes	Ref.
2012	Model Minority	Josie		
2017	Limelight	Michelle Gleason		
2020	The Call	Tonya		
2023	Zoey 102	Quinn Pensky		

=== Television ===
Year	Title	Role	Notes	Ref.
2002	Apple Valley Knights	Molly Knight	Unsold TV pilot	
2002	American Dreams	Jenny McMullen	Episode: "Pryor Knowledge"	
2003	Judging Amy	Janice Witherspoon	Episode: "The Wrong Man"	
2003	Carnivàle	Irina	2 episodes	
2003	Strong Medicine	Paige Jackson	Episode: "Prescriptions"	
2005	8 Simple Rules	Riley	Episode: "Closure"	
2005–2008	Zoey 101	Quinn Pensky	Main role	
2008	The Young and the Restless	Eden Baldwin	Regular role	
2009	Weeds	Danielle / Pinky	2 episodes	
2009	Mad Men	Sandy	Episode: "Seven Twenty Three"	
2009	Castle	Rosie Freeman	Episode: "Vampire Weekend"	
2009–2013	Big Time Rush	Camille Roberts	Recurring role	
2010	The Mentalist	Isabel Seberg	Episode: "Code Red"	
2011	CSI: Miami	Megan Wells	Episode: "Stoned Cold"	
2012	Sketchy	Batgirl	Episode: "Gotham Rock Anthem"	
2012	The Fresh Beat Band	Princess	Episode: "Royal Wedding"	
2012	Pair of Kings	Nannie	Episodes: "The Oogli Stick"	
2014	Melissa & Joey	Chris	3 episodes	
2014	Guilty at 17	Traci Scott	Television film	
2020	All That	Herself	Season 11 episode	

== Awards and nominations ==
Year	Award	Category	Work	Result
2003	Young Artist Award	Best Performance in a Feature Film – Supporting Young Actress	Never Never	Nominated
2004	Young Artist Award	Best Performance in a TV Series – Recurring Young Actress	Carnivàle	Nominated
2006	Young Artist Award	Best Young Ensemble Performance in a TV Series (Comedy or Drama) (Note: Shared with Jamie Lynn Spears, Sean Flynn, Alexa Nikolas, Paul Butcher, Christopher Massey, Kristin Herrera, Matthew Underwood, Victoria Justice.)	Zoey 101	Won
2007	Young Artist Award	Best Young Ensemble Performance in a TV Series (Comedy or Drama) (Note: Shared with Jamie Lynn Spears, Sean Flynn, Alexa Nikolas, Paul Butcher, Christopher Massey, Matthew Underwood, Victoria Justice.)	Zoey 101	Won
2008	Young Artist Award	Best Young Ensemble Performance in a TV Series (Note: Shared with Jamie Lynn Spears, Sean Flynn, Paul Butcher, Christopher Massey, Matthew Underwood, Victoria Justice.)	Zoey 101	Nominated
2008	Young Artist Award	Best Performance in a TV Series – Recurring Young Actress	Zoey 101	Won
2009	Young Artist Award	Best Performance in a TV Series (Comedy or Drama) – Supporting Young Actress	Zoey 101	Nominated
2009	Young Artist Award	Best Performance in a TV Series – Recurring Young Actress	The Young and the Restless	Won
2010	Young Artist Award	Guest Starring Young Actress	Mad Men	Nominated
2011	Young Artist Award	Best Performance in a TV Series – Guest Starring Young Actress 16–21	The Mentalist	Nominated
2011	Young Artist Award	Best Performance in a TV Series – Recurring Young Actress 17–21	Big Time Rush	Won
2012	Young Artist Award	Best Performance in a TV Series – Guest Starring Young Actress 17–21	CSI: Miami	Nominated
2012	Young Artist Award	Best Performance in a TV Series – Recurring Young Actress 17–21	Big Time Rush	Won
2013	Young Artist Award	Best Performance in a TV Series – Guest Starring Young Actress 17–21	Pair of Kings	Nominated
