= List of Zoey 101 episodes =

Zoey 101 is an American comedy drama television series created by Dan Schneider for Nickelodeon. It aired from January 9, 2005, to May 2, 2008. A total of 61 episodes were aired, spanning four seasons.

== Series overview ==
Season	Episodes	Originally released	
Season	Episodes	First released	Last released
1	13	January 9, 2005	May 1, 2005
2	12	September 10, 2005	April 30, 2006
3	23	September 24, 2006	January 4, 2008
4	13	January 27, 2008	May 2, 2008

== Episodes ==
=== Season 1 (2005) ===
No. overall	No. in season	Title	Directed by	Written by	Original release date	Prod. code	U.S. viewers (millions)
1	1	"Welcome to PCA"	Savage Steve Holland	Dan Schneider	January 9, 2005	101	3.4
Zoey Brooks (Jamie Lynn Spears) and her younger brother, Dustin (Paul Butcher) start to attend Pacific Coast Academy (PCA), an elite boarding school in California. While there, Zoey meets Chase Matthews (Sean Flynn), a friendly guy with high hopes of getting a girlfriend. Chase leads Zoey to her dorm, where she meets Nicole Bristow (Alexa Nikolas), a savvy girl who is easily attracted to hot boys and Dana Cruz (Kristin Herrera), a tomboy who does not accept diversity. A boy named Logan Reese (Matthew Underwood) challenges the girls to a basketball match. Logan picks his team, which includes Chase and Michael Barret (Christopher Massey), another friendly guy who is willing to accept a challenge. Zoey chooses her team, which includes Nicole, Dana, and Quinn Pensky (Erin Sanders), a meddlesome scientist who is always inventing wacky items. The girls lose the basketball game by one point, prompting Logan to tease them. The coach of the basketball team then asks Zoey and Dana if they want to join the basketball team because they helped the most. Zoey accepts, while Dana says she will "think about it".
2	2	"New Roomies"	Savage Steve Holland	Steve Holland	January 9, 2005	102	3.3
Zoey's roommates, Nicole and Dana, do not get along and fight every day, which drives Zoey crazy. Once Zoey tells them how annoying they are, they go against Zoey, and all three of them have a falling out. Zoey decides to move in with Quinn but soon finds her constant testing experiments bothering her. Since Nicole and Dana are not her friends and Quinn is strange to be around, Zoey starts hanging out with Chase. Zoey and Chase plan on watching a movie. Logan keeps telling Chase that he is in love with Zoey and should try getting her away from making up with Nicole and Dana. However, by the time the movie rolls around, Zoey has already made up with Nicole and Dana, and the movie date, meant for two, becomes a movie date for four. Meanwhile, after spending all his money on gummy worms, Dustin tries to find a way to earn money. He tries to tutor students on how to speak Spanish, only to fail miserably as Dustin hardly knows Spanish. In the end, he succeeds in earning money by playing the guitar and singing his own song, "Gummy Worm Blues".
3	3	"Webcam"	Fred Savage	Dan Schneider	January 16, 2005	105	3.7
Zoey and the other girls are in the girls' lounge playing a game called Confess or Stress, where a player must either tell a secret or do a dare. Chase and Logan visit the lounge during the game, and while there, Logan gives the girls a huge teddy bear. Logan then decides to "rest" in his dorm because he is not feeling well. The next day, the girls' personal secrets are being heard all over campus, with new secrets coming out as more days pass. Soon, Zoey gets blamed by the other girls for revealing their secrets. Zoey, Quinn and Nicole soon discover that the bear Logan gave them, which has been in the lounge ever since, has a webcam inside it. Zoey asks Chase if he is part of this scheme, which he denies. The two become aware that Logan has been spying on the girls after looking on his laptop. To get revenge on Logan, the girls give him something to watch, which leads him to tell Dean Rivers about it. In the end, Logan gets in trouble and loses his job at Sushi Rox for faking his sick leave. Absent: Paul Butcher as Dustin Brooks
4	4	"Defending Dustin"	Fred Savage	Anthony Del Broccolo	January 23, 2005	103	3.2
When Keith Finch bullies Dustin into doing his homework, Zoey confronts the bully in public, embarrassing Dustin. As Zoey feels the need to protect her brother, Dustin tells her that she is babying him too much and he can defend himself. Dustin looks to Chase and Michael for advice, and they tell him to defend himself the next time he gets bullied. Zoey and Chase come up with their own idea by getting Herb, the school janitor and an aspiring actor, to portray the dean of discipline, who sends a loud and unequivocal message to Keith before Dustin can confront him again. Meanwhile, Zoey, Nicole, Dana, Chase, and Michael try to hide a dog that Chase and Michael found, Elvis, from the dorm advisors. It is against school rules to have pets on campus. Absent: Erin Sanders as Quinn Pensky, Matthew Underwood as Logan Reese
5	5	"Prank Week"	Savage Steve Holland	Anthony Del Broccolo	January 30, 2005	108	3.9
It is PCA's prank week, and the girls find themselves the constant victims of pranks as it is their first year at the school. They allow the pranks to continue without retaliating, but after Logan and the other boys pull off the ultimate water balloon prank, the girls decide to defend themselves. Zoey gets the idea of putting women's clothes and lipstick on the statue of the man who founded PCA, but the founder's son, Mr. Bradford, comes to the school and becomes angered over the disrespectful display of his father. As punishment, he decides that PCA will revert to an all-boys school after the current semester. Not wanting all the girls to suffer for the prank, Zoey takes full blame and appeals to Mr. Bradford to expel only her, to which he agrees on the condition she apologizes to the entire student body. As Zoey prepares to leave PCA, a mysterious liquid flows from the statue's legs. Logan risks getting expelled as the mastermind behind this latest display, but everyone else decides to share the blame. As a result, Mr. Bradford now confronted with having to expel everyone else, as well as Zoey, reluctantly agrees not to expel anyone, if the students will just stop dishonoring his father. Absent: Paul Butcher as Dustin Brooks
6	6	"Jet X"	Savage Steve Holland	Eric Friedman	February 13, 2005	106	N/A
Zoey, Dana and Nicole are constantly oversleeping and are late to class. One day, one of their teachers, Mr. Bender, brings a guest to discuss product advertising and offer the class a chance to win free Jet X scooters. They break into teams to produce Jet X commercials, which will be judged on creativity and content. Logan, Chase and Michael work together, with Logan's approach involving fancy video equipment and famous actors. Zoey, Dana and Nicole are on another team and approach their commercial without the glamour, but they have creative differences. Their arguing ends up on video as Quinn, who is filming their commercial, has trouble turning off the camera; but the unexpected footage proves valuable when Zoey does the editing, as they each mention a positive theme of the Jet X during the argument. When the commercials are presented to the class, Zoey's team comes out the winner. The next day, Zoey, Dana and Nicole wake up again just ten minutes before Mr. Bender's class, but they have their Jet X scooters to get them to class faster. When Logan asks for a ride to class, they refuse to give him one, which leads him to just running to class himself. Absent: Paul Butcher as Dustin Brooks
7	7	"The Play"	Adam Weissman	Steven Molaro	February 20, 2005	104	N/A
Chase writes a play that he hopes to star in as the male lead—with Zoey as the female lead. The play is written so that the male and female leads kiss near the end of the play. Complications arise when Logan gets the male lead instead. Zoey starts seeing a different side of Logan and starts to develop a crush on him, much to Chase's dismay. This prompts Chase to change his play, replacing the kissing part, which is met with disapproval from his teacher. When Chase finds out Dustin is sick, it gives him another idea that would effectively remove Logan from the play, but it backfires. During the play, Logan gets irritated over Zoey's minor mishaps, which leads her not to kiss him in the final scene.
8	8	"Quinn's Date"	Steve Hoefer	Eric Friedman	March 6, 2005	109	3.0
Quinn develops a crush on Mark Del Figgalo, but she is too afraid to ask him out. She has Zoey ask for her, but Mark shows no interest in Quinn when Zoey talks to him. Trying not to hurt Quinn's feelings, Zoey makes her believe that he is interested in her. Zoey and Chase then concoct a way that Quinn can go on her date without Mark knowing, but it all goes wrong when Mark's real girlfriend, Courtney, finds out and breaks up with him. Meanwhile, Dustin takes care of Elvis—Michael, Chase, and Logan's dog—while the other boys are busy, even though he is terribly afraid of animals. Absent: Matthew Underwood as Logan Reese
9	9	"Spring Fling"	Steve Hoefer	Steve Holland	March 13, 2005	107	3.7
Zoey, Dana and Nicole are in charge of PCA's spring fling committee and aim to get Drake Bell to perform at the event. When they find out it costs $5,000 to book him, Zoey and her friends start a fund-raiser, though they raise only a small portion of what they need. A former PCA student offers enough money for them to reach their goal and leaves them to wash his car, but they accidentally damage it and must use some of the funds to get it fixed before he returns. When Drake Bell arrives, his manager sees they do not have enough for the gig and consequently cancels the performance. However, Drake notices some students wearing T-shirts which were designed by Zoey and offers to do the concert for free if she gives him the shirt design. Meanwhile, Quinn experiments on Dustin to see his reaction when he is deprived of sleep, with a wristband device that shocks him awake if he falls asleep. Absent: Matthew Underwood as Logan Reese
10	10	"Backpack"	Savage Steve Holland	Dan Schneider	April 3, 2005	110	N/A
When Nicole stains a backpack at the PCA store and is forced to buy it, she is really disappointed until Zoey decorates it for her. This becomes the envy of everyone, as they want their backpacks to be as eye-catching as Nicole's, but a girl named Stacy ends up stealing Zoey's idea and later prepares to land a deal with the store to sell her backpacks. To counter, Zoey adds more features to her backpack design, which include a back massager and speakers. When the store owner sees Zoey's backpacks, he is more impressed with her design than with Stacy's unoriginal one and makes a deal with Zoey. Instead of taking the money from the store's profits, Zoey gets a jukebox for the lounge. Meanwhile, Quinn decides to grow a banapple tree—one which grows a special fruit that is a cross between a banana and an apple. It ends up being a disaster as the banapple tree tastes terrible and its acidic juice can melt through anything. Absent: Paul Butcher as Dustin Brooks
11	11	"Disc Golf"	Savage Steve Holland	Anthony Del Broccolo	April 10, 2005	112	N/A
Zoey and her friends are worn out from always running in gym class. To resolve this, they form a disc golf team and get it recognized as a sanctioned sport at PCA. This would excuse them from participating in gym class if their team can win against another accredited school within ten days. They end up playing against a youth detention center team, but after Logan joins the PCA team, Zoey learns they have one too many players and need to sit one out—Nicole winds up on the bench. Toward the end of the match, with PCA leading, Zoey feels Nicole needs a chance, so she puts her in after hurting her wrist, which turns out to be a fake injury. Nicole's first shot misses, but the opposing team decides to go looking for her disc and makes a getaway instead, resulting in PCA winning by forfeit. Absent: Paul Butcher as Dustin Brooks
12	12	"School Dance"	Adam Weissman	Eric Friedman	April 17, 2005	111	N/A
Two members from the school dance committee come to Mr. Bender's class to discuss a personality quiz they are using to partner students with the same interests for the dance, and how this system will benefit Zoey and her classmates. To ensure he gets paired with Zoey, Chase tricks her into giving him her answers to the quiz. However, his plan backfires when another guy, Glen Davis (Asher Book), also gets matched with Zoey. While the two boys argue over who should dance with her, Zoey discovers that both of them were deceitful in their effort to partner with her and dances with neither. Meanwhile, Michael accidentally gets paired with a foreign exchange student, a boy named Olivary, as his dance partner, and Dana and Logan get partnered. Nicole's partner is a boy quite similar to her, Nicholas, who ends up annoying her. Absent: Paul Butcher as Dustin Brooks, Erin Sanders as Quinn Pensky
13	13	"Little Beach Party"	Savage Steve Holland	Steve Holland	May 1, 2005	113	3.3
As the semester comes to an end, Zoey and her friends are psyched about attending PCA's annual beach party at Mystic Beach, but following their final exams, they all take an unexpected nap due to one of Quinn's concoctions and end up missing the final bus to the party. They settle on taking a taxi to Mystic Beach, but thanks to Logan's wrong directions, they wind up on a deserted beach more than one hundred miles away. With no cellphone signal or Wi-Fi hot spot, they are stuck there until someone stumbles upon them. All is not lost, however, when they decide to have their own beach party, starting their own tradition. Later on, combining the reception range from Chase's cellphone and Michael's laptop, Quinn manages to get a strong enough signal to call Mr. Bender to pick them up. Note: This episode marks the final appearance of Kristin Herrera as Dana Cruz.

=== Season 2 (2005–06) ===
No. overall	No. in season	Title	Directed by	Written by	Original release date	Prod. code	U.S. viewers (millions)
14	1	"Back to PCA"	Adam Weissman	Dan Schneider	September 10, 2005	201	N/A
It is the girls' second year at PCA. Dana has been accepted to a European Exchange Program, so Zoey and Nicole think will have their dorm room to themselves. However, Coco informs them they will be getting a new roommate. Zoey and Nicole go to the housing office hoping to choose a roommate, but their request is denied after Nicole accidentally destroys the secretary's perfume collection. When they return to their dorm, they find their new roommate, Lola Martinez (Victoria Justice), a goth-punk girl who disturbs them by drinking raw eggs and claiming to talk to the dead. As Lola's behavior grows more erratic, Zoey and Nicole are out of the dorm, but they later discover that Lola is not a goth-punk, but an aspiring actress who managed to fool them with her acting skills. Meanwhile, Michael and Chase have to deal with Logan, whose father has given him a huge entertainment center for their dorm room—which turns out to be a huge headache. Note: This episode marks the first appearance of Victoria Justice as Lola Martinez.
15	2	"Time Capsule"	Steve Hoefer	Steve Holland	September 18, 2005	202	3.4
When the gang looks at an old PCA yearbook belonging to Mr. Bender, they wonder what future PCA students will think of them. It gives Zoey an idea to put together a time capsule, and Mr. Bender makes it a class project. Each student will put an item that best represents them into the capsule. Zoey decides to make a DVD about her life at PCA for her project. After she tells Chase about her video and possibly mentioning him in it, he becomes desperate to know what she said about him and will go to any lengths to find out, rather than wait 20 years. Zoey later decides she will let him know what she said in 10 years. Meanwhile, Nicole tries to help Quinn with her snoring problem. Absent: Paul Butcher as Dustin Brooks
16	3	"Election"	Adam Weissman	Eric Friedman	October 16, 2005	203	N/A
The election for class president is nearing, and Chase and Zoey wind up nominating each other to run. In doing so, they make a pact not to let the election campaigning affect their friendship, but this gets tested when Logan resorts to various tactics to help Chase win—none of which Chase knows about. Amid Zoey's frustrations, Chase attempts to drop out of the election, but she refuses to accept his withdrawal. A smear ad then appears on the school's television, depicting Chase as an unfit candidate for president. While Zoey gets blamed for the commercial, she finds out Chase was actually behind it. After he holds a press conference regarding the commercial, Chase formally drops out and later discovers Zoey dropped out, too, but before he did. Zoey apologizes to Chase for getting mad at him over what Logan did. Mark Del Figgalo, as the only other one running, ends up becoming the class president. Absent: Paul Butcher as Dustin Brooks
17	4	"Haunted House"	Steve Zuckerman	Steve Holland	October 29, 2005	206	3.3
Every Halloween at PCA, the upper school makes a haunted house for the lower school. For this Halloween, Logan is in charge of the haunted house and promises it will be much scarier than any ordinary one. As the guests visit Logan's haunted house, Dustin's roommate, Jack, disappears and then Dustin himself. A voice calling out the names of both boys precedes their disappearance, so when it says Logan's name, he gets scared and runs away. It turns out Zoey and Chase had surprises of their own, as they reveal Dustin and Jack hiding inside a casket but they are fine. Meanwhile, Michael gets chased all over PCA by two French visitors who think he is hurt, and Nicole mistakes Mark for an adorable guy she falls for named Tim, as both men are wearing mummy costumes. Absent: Victoria Justice as Lola Martinez
18	5	"Bad Girl"	Steve Hoefer	Anthony Del Broccolo	November 13, 2005	204	3.4
Dustin's new girlfriend, Trisha Kirby (Jennette McCurdy), turns out to be a very rude girl. Zoey sends Chase to persuade Trisha to stop going out with Dustin and go for someone older. She gets the wrong idea and thinks that Chase is asking her out and she accepts. To make Trisha stop going out with Chase, he and Zoey pretend to be boyfriend and girlfriend. Meanwhile, Michael and Logan get sprayed by a skunk and ask Quinn for help, which backfires when she sprays their clothes with a disintegrating gas, leaving them naked, having to use trash bags to prevent exposing nudity.
19	6	"Broadcast Views"	Adam Weissman	Anthony Del Broccolo	January 15, 2006	207	N/A
Chase and Michael have their own webcast, and they feature Zoey and Logan on one. After Zoey and Logan argue about gender preferences, Chase and Michael ban them from being on their show again, but after the school newspaper praises the webcast with the two guests, they change their mind. Zoey and Logan get their own segment called "He Says, She Says", and while Chase and Michael enjoy the boost in views, it leads to student disruption during school time, so Dean Rivers cancels their show. A TV station producer later becomes interested after Zoey sends him a copy of a webcast, which Chase made for her. Excited they will have an even greater audience, Chase and Michael find out instead that the producer is only interested in Zoey and Logan's segment. Zoey decides to use the platform to start a protest against Dean Rivers' act of censorship, causing him to eventually back down and allowing Chase and Michael's webcast to resume. Meanwhile, Nicole is depressed because her being distracted by cute boys is causing her to fail algebra, so Quinn and Lola try to fix her problem by using a hypnosis technique, which works too well. Absent: Paul Butcher as Dustin Brooks
20	7	"Girls Will Be Boys"	Adam Weissman	Jason Gelles & Mike Haukom	January 29, 2006	211	3.7
When the girls can no longer relax on the boys' dorm roof, they set out to prove that boys can act the same with girls around. They disguise Lola as a boy named "Steve", and she goes to live with Chase and Logan. Michael helps the girls as part of the plan, but he also cannot stay with his roommates because of Lola. He pretends to be sick and checks into the school infirmary because of an attractive young nurse, only to find out this nurse works with the younger students, so he ends up with a tough and burly nurse who works with the older students. Michael's stay in the infirmary becomes longer than expected as he catches the chicken pox from Dustin, who has been in the infirmary recuperating from it even before Michael knew about the young nurse. Meanwhile, Lola's disguise as "Steve" gets foiled when Chase and Logan have a water basketball game, and "Steve" is dragged into it as Michael's substitute. In the end, the girls prove their point, since Chase and Logan acted normal around "Steve", and are allowed again to relax on the boys' dorm roof.
21	8	"Robot Wars"	Adam Weissman	Dan Schneider & Steve Molaro	February 12, 2006	205	N/A
Zoey challenges three computer geeks to a robot battle, but first she needs to build a robot to compete. As she and most of her friends have no idea how to do so, Zoey asks Quinn for help. Though not on board at first, Quinn goes ahead and starts building the robot, motivated by the geeks' arrogance. Things go smoothly until Logan makes fun of Quinn, and the rest of the gang laughs in response, causing her to get upset and quit. To finish the robot, Zoey turns to Miles, the smartest guy at PCA, who will help only if she arranges to set him up on a date with Nicole. During the robot battle, the geeks destroy Zoey's robot, but are disqualified due to violating one of the rules in building theirs. While the geeks are afforded a rematch once their robot is within the guidelines, Quinn ends that chance by destroying it with a small robot she built to get revenge on them. Later, Zoey, Logan and the rest apologize to Quinn for making fun of her. Absent: Paul Butcher as Dustin Brooks
22	9	"Lola Likes Chase"	Steve Hoefer	Eric Friedman	February 26, 2006	208	3.7
Lola needs a tutor because she is failing biology; she asks Chase to tutor her, and he does. As they spend time with each other, things get more serious. Lola asks Chase on a date after which Zoey agrees with, who considers Chase as no more than a close friend. Chase seeks advice from Michael, who reveals what Zoey said about him and encourages him to go out with Lola. Zoey later becomes worried over the idea of Lola and Chase being together, despite what she said. When the two are together, Lola finds out Chase is not truly into her because he has feelings for someone else. Meanwhile, Logan teaches Dustin how to impress ladies, but his obnoxious approach, as Dustin discovers, drives them away instead. Dustin does succeed in scoring a date by being his friendly self, while Logan gets humiliated.
23	10	"Spring Break-Up"	Steve Hoefer	Dan Schneider	March 10, 2006	212–213	4.4
Zoey and the gang go to Logan's beach house for spring break. They find out that they are testing a new TV show Logan's father (Michael Corbett) is producing called Gender Defenders a game where two teams of opposite genders compete in three challenges: Mental, Physical and Creative. The boys compete against the girls to see which of them will be on the show's first episode, though they later find out they will all be. Prior to the competition, each of them receives an electronic communicator called a Tek-Mate for taking part. When Chase uses his to send Michael a text, but Michael says he never received the text, the two discover it got sent to Zoey. When the competition starts, Chase manages to snatch Zoey's Tek-Mate, without her knowing, and deletes the unintended text, but finds himself unable to return it with her knowing. As the first round ends, Zoey discovers the theft, and that Chase was behind it and she believes it was sabotage for the round, which strains their friendship. Things come to a head, when the two are forced into a one-on-one physical challenge of water jousting as a tie-breaking event. Chase gains the upper hand, but feeling guilty about everything, he throws the challenge, and Zoey and girls are the winners. Back at PCA, Chase comes clean with Zoey about his reasons for taking her Tek-Mate, but when Zoey wants to know what the text was about, he becomes silent. While the students are watching the first episode of Gender Defenders, Chase decides to send another text to Zoey about that original text, confessing that he loves her. He suddenly realizes Zoey does not have her Tek-Mate with her, and she ends up never getting the message due to the Tek-Mate being left behind and falling into a fountain. Note: In production order, this is the last episode that Alexa Nikolas filmed for the series before she left the series.
24	11	"People Auction"	Adam Weissman	Anthony Del Broccolo	April 9, 2006	209	N/A
After a fire burns down Sushi Rox, Zoey and the gang hold a people auction to raise money in order to rebuild it. Chase and Michael get auctioned to the sushi-crazy gym teacher, and are forced to handle raw fish and make him his own sushi. Zoey, Lola, and Nicole become Logan's personal cheerleaders, and they are told to "cheer his awesomeness", as in cheer for everything he does. His plan backfires when the girls decide to take him a bit too literally.
25	12	"Quinn's Alpaca"	Michael Grossman	Eric Friedman	April 30, 2006	210	N/A
Quinn's pet alpaca, Otis, is depressed because he misses her, leaving her feeling depressed as well. The girls try to cheer her up by throwing an alpaca-themed party, but this only makes Quinn miss Otis even more, so she decides to leave PCA to meet with him back home in Seattle. As this could get her suspended, Zoey talks her out of doing so, and with Dean Rivers' approval, the girls arrange to bring Otis to PCA so Quinn can spend time with him on campus. Meanwhile, the guys make a bet to see who can go the longest without saying any words containing the letter "S". The first person to say at least one word that has the letter (but not the sound) "S" has to run around campus wearing a bikini top, a hula skirt and wear a helmet with a flashing light. Michael ends up losing the game as he has a date. Absent: Paul Butcher as Dustin Brooks Note: This episode marked the final appearance of Alexa Nikolas as Nicole Bristow.

=== Season 3 (2006–08) ===
No. overall	No. in season	Title	Directed by	Written by	Original release date	Prod. code	U.S. viewers (millions)
26	1	"Surprise"	Adam Weissman	Dan Schneider	September 24, 2006	301	3.5
It is a new year at PCA, which leads to several surprises, including the news that Nicole has been diagnosed with "Obsessive Male Gender Disorder" and sent to an all-girls school until further notice. After Quinn is left without a room due to a clerical error, she becomes Zoey and Lola's new roommate. After everyone settles into their new rooms, Chase tells Zoey he wants to talk with her privately. Lola and Quinn say that Chase wants to tell her he is in love with her, but Zoey does not believe them. Meanwhile, Michael and Logan are fighting for the single bed in their new room. Zoey soon goes to go talk to Chase and ends up walking in on Chase and his new girlfriend, Rebecca (Daniella Monet) kissing.
27	2	"Chase's Girlfriend"	Steve Hoefer	Steve Holland	October 1, 2006	302	3.0
Sometime after the events of the previous episode, Chase's girlfriend, Rebecca, seems sweet until she tells Zoey to stay away from Chase. After Chase learns about this, he must make a decision: Rebecca or Zoey. Chase ends up dumping Rebecca. Meanwhile, Quinn is helping Logan with his free throws in basketball, but tricks him into doing embarrassing things in revenge for him calling her a spaz, something she has hated being called since she was a child. Absent: Paul Butcher as Dustin Brooks
28	3	"Hot Dean"	Michael Grossman	Steve Holland	October 22, 2006	303	2.9
A new hot Dean, Dean Taylor, fills in for Dean Rivers when Dustin, his friends and Quinn hit Dean Rivers with a model airplane by accident. Meanwhile, the girls' Dorm Advisor Coco has just been dumped by her boyfriend Carl again. Zoey and her friends set up Dean Taylor and Coco on a date at Sushi Rox because they are tired of hearing about Coco's complaints about Carl.
29	4	"Zoey's Tutor"	Michael Grossman	Steve Holland	November 5, 2006	305	3.1
Zoey struggles with Chemistry when she scores a "C" on a test. She is given a new tutor; to her surprise, her tutor is Logan, who secretly happens to be one of the best Chemistry students. Zoey starts learning Chemistry with Logan behind her friends' backs. All of her friends become suspicious, especially Chase. Chase tries to find out why, so Logan lies and says that Zoey is dating him, which Chase does not believe. Meanwhile, Quinn tries to catch her rat, which was lost and bugging Lola since Quinn's plasma bolt hit Lola in the head and made her unconscious. Absent: Paul Butcher as Dustin Brooks
30	5	"The Great Vince Blake"	Adam Weissman	Steve Holland	November 12, 2006	306	N/A
Vince Blake appears to be the ladies' man, the best school athlete, and the savior of the football team. He helped PCA advance to the state championships. Little do people know, he is in fact a cheater; Chase caught him taking pictures of a history test with his cell phone. Chase must choose: not to tell the teacher and let Vince cheat more or make PCA lose its biggest football game. Logan, Michael, and the football team convince him not to tell, but Zoey thinks he should. Meanwhile, Zoey, Lola, Quinn, and Mark put healthy snacks called Moon Bars to try to persuade the students to stop eating junk food, but ends in chaos as they turn out to be addictive after Quinn and Mark put cactus goo in them to enhance their flavor. Absent: Paul Butcher as Dustin Brooks
31	6	"Silver Hammer Society"	Adam Weissman	Jeffrey Bushell	November 26, 2006	307	N/A
Zoey, Michael, and Lola are invited into a secret society at PCA called the Silver Hammer Society. Chase is also invited to join, but he rejects the offer. To keep their position, the rest of the group must complete ridiculous tasks. Logan, who is angry that he wasn't invited, starts to make his own club, the Loganites. Meanwhile, Quinn acts weird around new girl Sara when she suspects she knew Quinn from a while back. Soon, Sara finds out that she knew Quinn from a beauty pageant she was in as a child. Absent: Paul Butcher as Dustin Brooks
32	7	"Michael Loves Lisa"	Roger Nygard	Dan Schneider	January 7, 2007	313	N/A
After developing a crush on a girl named Lisa, Michael becomes too nervous to perform in the Open Mic Night, causing him to vomit on her and another guy. While cleaning up, Lisa falls in love with the other guy. Upon hearing this, Michael becomes really sad. Meanwhile, Logan and Chase are having a go-kart race. But Chase's out of control go-kart crashes into Lisa's table and Michael pushes her out of the way to save her and she kisses him and they start going out. Absent: Paul Butcher as Dustin Brooks
33	8	"Wrestling"	Michael Grossman	Ethan Banville & Arthur Gradstein	March 4, 2007	310	3.10
After seeing Zoey stop a fight, the wrestling coach wants Zoey to join the wrestling team. The days pass, and she doesn't get a chance to wrestle anyone. Then later on, she finds out that she will be wrestling in the tournament. However, all the boys Zoey is put against forfeit because they don't want to wrestle a girl. As she is about to face the undefeated champion, Chuck Javers, Zoey finds out that was the coach's plan, and was the whole reason he put her on the team. Meanwhile, Lola wants to be a reporter, and joins Jeremiah Trottman during the tournament. Absent: Paul Butcher as Dustin Brooks
34	9	"Zoey's Balloon"	Steve Hoefer	George Doty IV	March 11, 2007	311	3.30
Zoey and her friends must write a secret and tie it to a balloon for psychology class. However, Zoey's balloon gets stuck in a tree, and someone finds and learns Zoey's secret. The mysterious person begins blackmailing her, forcing Zoey to do various cruel tasks. It turns out that the person who was blackmailing Zoey was Rebecca (Daniella Monet), Chase's ex-girlfriend wanting to get revenge on Zoey for Chase dumping her. Absent: Paul Butcher as Dustin Brooks
35	10	"Chase's Grandma"	Michael Grossman	Ethan Banville & Arthur Gradstein	March 18, 2007	312	3.2
Chase's birthday is coming up but he is too busy writing a 5,000 word essay to care. When Zoey hears that Chase and his grandmother share the same birthday and that Chase shared a close relationship with her when he was young, she thinks she has the perfect gift for him; to bring his grandmother to PCA, but she gets the flu and is unable to come to PCA. Meanwhile, Lola and Quinn are trying to get Dustin's arm out of a vending machine. Later, the secret birthday party they threw for Chase became a disaster after Chase learned his grandmother had more than a flu and it got worse and his grandmother died on her and Chase's birthday. On another scene we see that Zoey makes Chase feel better by hugging him in the rain.
36	11	"Quarantine"	Adam Weissman	Steve Holland	March 25, 2007	304	N/A
When Quinn accidentally spills her own germ in their dorm room, the girls along with Logan, Chase, and Michael are quarantined in their room until it is proved to be safe. However, they begin to drive each other crazy: Michael gets very hungry, Lola keeps screaming because she is auditioning for a play, Logan is obsessed with looking at himself in the mirror, Chase begins to feel ill, Quinn is worried that Mark may be cheating on her, and Zoey has to miss a date with a guy named Danny. Note: Before airing on TV, this episode was released as a bonus on the Season 1 DVD in the U.S. on February 13, 2007.
37	12	"The Radio"	Steve Hoefer	Ethan Banville & Arthur Gradstein	July 18, 2007	314	N/A
Chase sells Zoey a "fada model #115" radio for $5 and a coupon for a free taco. Quinn discovers that the radio is worth $10,000 and Zoey plans to give the radio back to Chase. When Chase discovers the value of the radio, he yells at Zoey for not giving it back to him, even though she was planning to give it back. This makes her mad and she decides not to give the radio back. Their argument quickly expands to include the rest of the gang, who argue. Quinn and Logan think that Zoey should keep the radio, while Lola and Michael think that Zoey should return the radio to Chase. At the end of the episode, Zoey and Chase make up and agree to split the money only for Chase's grandfather takes the radio back after he too finds out its value. Meanwhile, after being teased by Lola about how she has never been kissed by Mark, Quinn tries to make him kiss her.
38	13	"Paige at PCA"	Roger Christiansen	Dan Schneider	August 10, 2007	318	N/A
A science prodigy named Paige Howard (Miranda Cosgrove) attends PCA and is going to install her new energy converter to make PCA run on "Paige Power". This upsets Quinn because she realizes that she may no longer be the smartest girl on campus, and she gives up science. When the energy converter threatens to cause a catastrophe Quinn realizes her science gift is needed when she saves the school from a near meltdown. Meanwhile, Chase and Logan try to make Michael think that he is going crazy for a psychology class project after he refuses to do his share of the work. The guys hire Coco's cousin to help out with their prank. Absent: Paul Butcher as Dustin Brooks
39	14	"Dance Contest"	Adam Weissman	Ethan Banville & Arthur Gradstein	September 16, 2007	321	3.7
Michael and Logan must help Chase become a wonderful dancer before a dance contest to dance with Zoey. Lola wants to get the main role in a play, but in the meantime, she tricks a British guy into going on a date with her. Also, Michael, Logan and Quinn try to be the customer of the week to get free coffee. Absent: Paul Butcher as Dustin Brooks
40	15	"Favor Chain"	Adam Weissman	Jeffrey Bushell	September 23, 2007	315	N/A
Zoey's father signs a permission slip, allowing Zoey to go off campus to meet her favorite author. She asks Coco to drive her and she says she'll do it, but Zoey must get her some special ravioli that only Michael can make. It trails in a favor chain when Michael asks for one where Stacey will finish their class project but Stacey wants a date with Logan and Logan wants his PCA ring back from Dustin and Dustin wants Lola to be his talent show partner Lola wants Chase to babysit their teacher's baby and Chase wants a bunch of nerds to stop bothering him and the nerds want Quinn's operating system. When it doesn't work due to Quinn's operating system having been accidentally destroyed by Mark, they all get everything back undoing all of Zoey's hard work, but at the end Coco still drives Zoey.
41	16	"Zoey's Ribs"	Steve Hoefer	George Doty IV	September 29, 2007	316	N/A
After an unknown deceased relative of Zoey's sends her "a thousand pounds of ribs", Zoey, Chase, Michael, and Logan agree to have a rib cook-off. After a fierce feud between Michael and Logan, they decide to compete against each other with Zoey on Michael's team, and Chase on Logan's. The famous cook off judge turns out to be a fraud wanted by the Authorities. Meanwhile, Quinn accidentally blows Mark's eyebrows off in an experiment gone awry, and she creates a stimulant that accelerates hair growth. This ended up working too well, as the hair constantly regenerates rapidly every time it is shaved off. Quinn and Mark decide to roll with it while waiting for the formula to wear off in 3-4 weeks. Absent: Paul Butcher as Dustin Brooks
42	17	"The Curse of PCA"	Steve Hoefer	Dan Schneider	October 13, 2007	308–309	3.4
After bringing up the legend of a former PCA student named Charles Galloway (Jeff Norkin), who fled to the wilderness above PCA at a place called Redstone Gulch because of an extremely hard test, the gang decides to go to the place for themselves, with help from Lola's crush, Leif, who then gets himself and Lola lost in the wilderness. There, they find the necklace of Charles L. Galloway. When the gang refuses to let Logan keep the necklace, which he says will be evidence that they proved the legend true, and make them famous at PCA, he steals it and puts it in Zoey's backpack, causing a violent thunderstorm to form a green cloud to come after Zoey and the others, which causes Zoey to break her ankle. Zoey must help save PCA by getting to Redstone Gulch and placing the necklace back where it came from. Absent: Paul Butcher as Dustin Brooks
43	18	"Drippin' Episode!"	David Kendall	Ethan Banville & Arthur Gradstein	October 21, 2007	317	3.3
Michael tries to introduce his new slang word, "drippin'", which means "good," "awesome," or "sweet." Logan gets a care package from his father, who is away in Japan, which includes a super-scary horror movie called Shinnyuusha. Evidently, Dustin gets terrified from watching this movie and stays with the girls overnight. The girls learn that Dustin was only scared for the first night and that he stayed for a couple of more nights because he missed hanging out with Zoey. Meanwhile, the guys' dorm encounters a new problem – the fire alarm goes off every night. At the end it turns out it was Logan's illegal J-Phone from Japan that was setting off the fire alarm. The J-Phone is illegal in the US as they operate on the same restricted frequencies used by police and fire departments as well as setting off fire alarms. This leads to Logan getting beaten soundly by the other boys in his dorm building.
44	19	"Son of a Dean"	Steve Hoefer	George Doty IV	November 4, 2007	319	3.50
Zoey starts dating Dean Rivers' son. But then, Zoey thinks he might not be perfect. Lola and Quinn told Zoey that he rigged the ticket but Zoey does not believe them until Lance tells Zoey himself that he can do that. Meanwhile, Logan makes a dance video for girls so they can dance with him from the TV. Chase and Michael struggle to make 26 more episodes of their wacky cartoons to give Toonjuice.com by the end of the month, and end up getting sued by Friday Night Live for plagiarizing the idea of two bowling pins afraid of a bowling ball rolling towards them. Absent: Paul Butcher as Dustin Brooks
45	20	"Hands on a Blix Van"	David Kendall	Jeffrey Bushell	November 18, 2007	320	3.18
There is a contest to see who can keep their hand on a Blix van for the longest. The winner gets a private Blix jet for two to anywhere in the world, and many people are determined that they can win. Logan tries to win by lying about breaking his leg, scaring students off, sneezing on their hands and he requested a chair so the competition would be easier for him. Logan gets Stacey to lose by offering to be her boyfriend for a week. Zoey wins by tricking Logan who ends up stuck with Stacey. Meanwhile, Lola and Quinn try to find a way to make Quinn stop laughing after a breath spray she made to cure her bad breath makes her laugh non-stop. In the end, Lola cures her by making out with Mark right in front of her. Absent: Paul Butcher as Dustin Brooks
46	21	"Miss PCA"	David Kendall	George Doty IV	December 2, 2007	322	N/A
Logan hosts a new "Miss PCA" beauty pageant. While Zoey, Lola and Chase initially find the event degrading, the girls ask to join when Logan reveals the prize of the contest: the chance to be on the cover of Buzz Magazine. When Zoey and Lola find out, they sign up, but Zoey and Lola become competitive and start sabotaging each other. In the meantime, Michael desperately tries to make Quinn laugh at his jokes. Absent: Paul Butcher as Dustin Brooks
47	22	"Logan Gets Cut Off"	Adam Weissman	Dan Schneider	December 9, 2007	323	N/A
Logan's father discovers that he purchased a $327,000 car without his permission. Malcolm (Michael Corbett) immediately steps in and takes control: he forcefully returns the car, takes away all of Logan's luxuries and expensive possessions, closes his bank account, and cuts his credit card in half. When Zoey, Lola and Chase see that Logan is in desperate need of help, Zoey does Logan's laundry, Lola helps him with his hair, Chase types out his report, and they all try to teach Logan how to fend for himself with no money. Meanwhile, Michael says he can get out of any difficultly tied ropes, so Mark and Quinn tie him up to see what he can do. Absent: Paul Butcher as Dustin Brooks
48	23	"Goodbye, Zoey?"	Steve Hoefer	Dan Schneider	January 4, 2008	324–325	7.28
Zoey's parents come for an unexpected visit to PCA and tell Zoey and Dustin that they are moving to England because their father's business is starting a new branch in London. When offered to accompany the parents to London, Dustin quickly declines the offer because he is seeing someone, but Zoey decides to think about it first. Although Zoey treasures Chase's opinion, Chase had heard the rumor before Zoey gets a chance to tell him about the news. This leads Chase to bitterly convince Zoey that she should go to London, and she decides to leave PCA. After she leaves, Chase starts hanging out with a disgusting girl named Gretchen who looks a lot like Zoey. He later admits that he only did so because he missed Zoey. In a cliffhanger ending, due to a webcam malfunction, Zoey watches Chase confess his love for her when talking to Michael and Logan.

=== Season 4 (2008) ===
No. overall	No. in season	Title	Directed by	Written by	Original release date	Prod. code	U.S. viewers (millions)
49	1	"Trading Places"	Adam Weissman	Dan Schneider	January 27, 2008	406	6.02
Zoey returns to PCA, but the gang has bad news of their own. Zoey wants to talk to Chase about the webcam malfunction, but Quinn, Lola, Michael, and Logan regretfully tell her that Chase is now at Covington. Chase frantically calls back, and he and Zoey end up going on a "date" over video chat after he tells Zoey that he must remain in London for the rest of the semester. A chat malfunction causes Chase and Zoey to end their date, and realizing that they cannot date like this, they agree to wait until Chase returns from London. Absent: Paul Butcher as Dustin Brooks
50	2	"Fake Roommate"	Adam Weissman	George Doty IV	January 27, 2008	401	5.72
Michael and Logan attempt to fool Miss Burvich, the housing lady, into thinking that Chase is still at PCA so that they can avoid having a new roommate. To do this, Logan makes a fake Chase. Meanwhile, it is time for Coco's job review with Dean Rivers. After learning that he likes lions, she tries to please him by bringing a "tame" lion into his office. Dean Rivers enters the office and the lion attacks, sending him to the hospital. Thus, Coco is fired and is hired as a bathroom attendant at Vacarro, a fancy restaurant close to PCA. The girls then get a new dorm advisor, Mira, who seems really sweet until they soon discover that she steals certain things from the girls. Absent: Paul Butcher as Dustin Brooks
51	3	"Alone at PCA"	David Kendall	Ethan Banville	February 3, 2008	402	3.3
The gang must stay on campus over spring break when the trip to Yosemite is cancelled. Stacey is waiting at PCA for her parents to pick her up to go skiing but they never show up and Stacey can't reach them when her cell phone number is blocked from her parents' home phone. Dean Rivers' golf trophy gets smashed and he assumes it was Michael and Logan so he puts them under dorm arrest. Zoey and the girls set out to find the real culprit who turns out to be a disgruntled former student who is now a grounds keeper. Absent: Paul Butcher as Dustin Brooks
52	4	"Rumor of Love"	Michael Grossman	Jeff Bushell	February 10, 2008	403	3.51
Michael and Logan learn that they will be getting a new roommate since Chase left for London. Their new roommate is named James Garrett (Austin Butler), who soon becomes a celebrity among all of the girls at PCA. A rumor spreads that Zoey and James are dating. Note: This episode marked the first appearance of Austin Butler as James Garrett.
53	5	"Anger Management"	Steve Hoefer	Matt Fleckenstein	February 17, 2008	404	3.4
Dustin is Logan's new assistant. However, the job is short-lived after Logan leaves Dustin an angry voicemail, which Dustin showed to James, Michael and Zoey. James then puts it on the Internet and everybody hears the message. Dean Rivers is unfortunately blamed for it when it ends up on a talk show. Anger struck, he sentences Logan to anger management classes. He can get out of the class if he manages to keep his cool outside of them, but Zoey is out to do whatever she can to make sure he goes back there by intentionally provoking him. Meanwhile, Lola eats nuts that Quinn spit out, and becomes angry at Quinn because she did not immediately tell her that those peanuts were in her mouth when she saw Lola eating them.
54	6	"Quinn Misses the Mark"	Roger Christiansen	Dan Schneider	February 24, 2008	405	4.04
Quinn and Mark agree to stop dating for a while, but Quinn sees him with a girl named Brooke, and is upset. She decides to start a new look to get Mark back. She begins to change her hairstyle, clothes, and makeup. Quinn's plans don't seem to go the right way, but she gets attention from other guys. Meanwhile, a horse begins following Michael because he feeds Logan's cookies to it. After attempting to get rid of the horse, he ends up bonding with him and even using him to give Zoey a ride to class. Quinn is comforted by Logan and they end up kissing, which immediately gets weird between them when Michael speeds past them on his horse while they are doing this. Absent: Paul Butcher as Dustin Brooks
55	7	"Walk-A-Thon"	Michael Grossman	Ethan Banville	March 9, 2008	407	3.7
Zoey and Dustin are participating in a charity walk-a-thon at PCA called The Big Walk, and they are getting sponsors to donate, but Lola accidentally pledges a total of $600. Zoey visits Carmine, the organizer of the walk-a-thon, to explain the problem to him, and discovers that he is extremely fierce. Meanwhile, Quinn and Logan are feeling weird about their kiss and newfound attraction, and they have to convince everyone, especially Michael, who may have seen them embracing, that they still hate each other. After several failed attempts to hide, they confront and immediately beg Michael to keep their relationship a secret. Michael instead reveals that he is under the impression that they are planning a surprise birthday party for him and laughs at the idea of Logan and Quinn being a couple, leaving Logan and Quinn in relief. Also, Lola attempts to knit a sweater, but finds it very difficult.
56	8	"Vince Is Back"	David Kendall	Dan Schneider	March 22, 2008	408	3.1
The gang is surprised to find out that the bully and football star, Vince Blake, is back after being expelled. The boys talk to Dean Rivers to try to get him to expel Vince. The girls decide to just ignore him, which proves harder than expected when Lola starts dating him, but Logan and Michael decide that it's time for some revenge, or "comeuppance" as Michael calls it. Absent: Paul Butcher as Dustin Brooks
57	9	"Dinner for Two Many"	Larry LaFond	Matt Fleckenstein	March 30, 2008	409	3.4
Zoey wants to go on a date with just James, with none of their other friends, and he takes them to a high expense and fancy restaurant called Vaccaro. Meanwhile, Quinn hates having to sneak around to spend time with Logan, and they plan a romantic dinner as their first official date. They also decide to go to Vaccaro, believing that no one at PCA can afford the pricey service there. Both couples, however, end up sitting right next to each other. Zoey notices them, and after two different lies told to cover up their secret, Michael and Lola end up joining the two couples, creating even more chaos. Absent: Paul Butcher as Dustin Brooks
58	10	"Coffee Cart Ban"	Roger Christiansen	George Doty IV	April 6, 2008	410	N/A
After Lola causes an accident involving coffee carts and Dean Rivers' wife, Dean Rivers bans all coffee carts at PCA and makes a rule that no coffee is allowed on campus. Logan and Michael start selling coffees in their room, but overcharges his customers, selling large coffees at $9 per cup, and $1 more for sugar. When the girls find out, they decide to open another coffee sale in their room, but they charge less than half of what Michael and Logan charge, at $4 per large cup. Logan finds out, and he decides to tell Dean Rivers about them selling coffee in their room. So the girls try to sabotage the boys coffee shop with a laser to shoot all of the plastic cups. Eventually, both groups are caught, and Dean Rivers is extremely unforgiving and relentless to the group. Even when Zoey tries to convince him that everyone thinks his rule is unfair he is unwilling to listen, but he uses Quinn's laser gun and accidentally breaks the door of his cupboard, which has a coffee machine behind it. This forces him to lift the coffee carts ban and the students can have coffee again. At the end, Calvin (the guy who works at the coffee cart) gets back at Logan by charging him $400 for one cup as revenge for overcharging the coffee prices in the first place. Absent: Paul Butcher as Dustin Brooks
59	11	"Roller Coaster"	Adam Weissman	Jeffrey Bushell	April 27, 2008	411	3.60
Zoey's physics class is going on a field trip to ride on a roller coaster. Everyone is excited to go, except for Michael. He seems to be afraid of rollercoasters. As Logan finds out about this, he tells everyone Michael is afraid of riding them. Michael is worried that Lisa thinks he is a wimp because he is scared to ride roller coasters. Absent: Paul Butcher as Dustin Brooks
60	12	"Chasing Zoey"	Steve Hoefer	Dan Schneider	May 2, 2008	412–413	5.11
Prom is approaching and everyone is preparing for the big event. When James finally tells Zoey that he loves her, Zoey herself begins to question her feelings for him. Meanwhile, Michael learns how to drive a stick shift from "a teacher" to drive Lisa to the prom. Logan and Quinn are still trying to keep their relationship a secret and decide to bring different dates to the prom, but their chosen fake dates (Dustin and Stacey) make it worse for them to bear. At the end, Zoey and James break up when she admits "something is in the way", Quinn and Logan finally reveal to everybody that they love each other and seal it with their first public kiss, Lola and Vince finally make it to the prom after being stranded because their taxi driver (Dan Schneider) had left the taxi and walked off after receiving an angry call, and Stacey gets hit by a car driven by Mark and loses her lisp, talking normally. Chase returns to PCA and he and Zoey share their first kiss, finally becoming a couple. The episode ends with everybody happily dancing at the prom. Note: In production order, this is the final episode to have been filmed for the series. It also marked the final appearance of Austin Butler as James Garrett.
61	13	"PCA Confidential"	Steve Hoefer	George Doty IV	May 2, 2008	326	5.05
Zoey and Chase, who are about to graduate from PCA, take a walk down memory lane when prospective new students question them about their experiences attending PCA. Meanwhile, Stacey becomes upset when no one asks her any questions even though she prepared a lot of answers. Note: This episode first aired in Canada on December 14, 2007, as part of season 3. An alternate edit with clip footage from "Chasing Zoey" was produced for its U.S. broadcast. Additionally Paul Butcher, Victoria Justice, Christopher Massey, Erin Sanders and Matthew Underwood are all physically absent in this episode and they do not appear outside of archive footage from past episodes. Jamie Lynn Spears and Sean Flynn are the only main cast members to physically appear in this episode and Sean Flynn is a main cast member in this episode because this episode was actually filmed during season 3 but it was instead aired for season 4 and in season 4 Sean Flynn returned on-set only as a special guest star. Absent: Paul Butcher as Dustin Brooks, Victoria Justice as Lola Martinez, Christopher Massey as Michael Barret, Erin Sanders as Quinn Pensky, Matthew Underwood as Logan Reese
