= Paul Butcher =

Paul Butcher may refer to:

- Paul Butcher (American football) (born 1963), American football linebacker
- Paul Butcher (actor) (born 1994), American actor, son of the above
