= Kristin Herrera =

American former actress (born 1989)

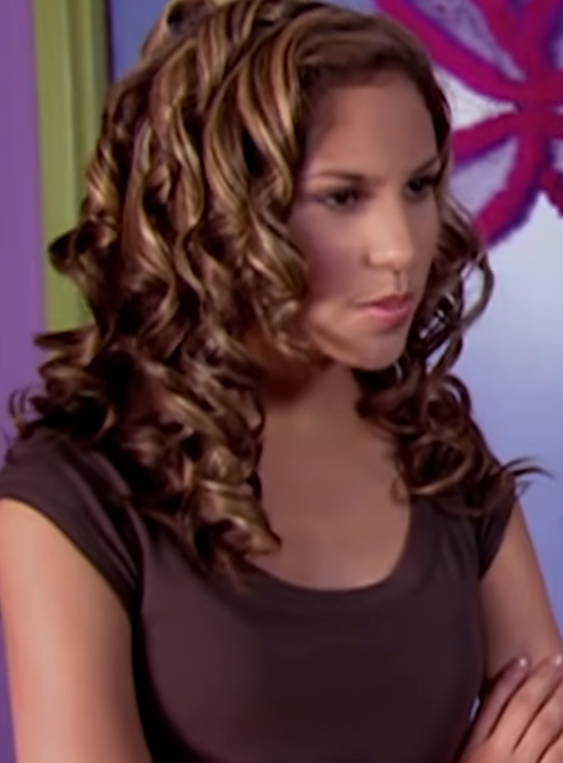
- Herrera on Zoey 101 in 2005, around the same time she was starring in General Hospital.
- Born: Kristin Lisa Herrera; February 21, 1989 (age 37); Los Angeles, California, U.S.
- Occupation: Actress
- Years active: 2000–2008; 2019–present
- Spouse: Daniel Novak (m. 2022)
- Children: 1

Kristin Lisa Herrera (born February 21, 1989) is an American actress. She is best known for her role as Dana Cruz on the first season of the Nickelodeon series Zoey 101 and as Lourdes Del Torro on General Hospital.

== Early life ==
Herrera was born on February 21, 1989, in Los Angeles, California. She has two older brothers and a sister, named Ryan, Justin, and Ashley respectively. She is of Mexican and Puerto Rican descent and speaks fluent Spanish. She attended Hillcrest Christian School in Granada Hills, Los Angeles.

== Career ==
Herrera has been acting in commercials ever since she was six. Her first TV role was in a phone service commercial. Other roles include Eleena on NYPD Blue, Aimee Varga on The Division, Sophie on The Bernie Mac Show, Katie on 7th Heaven and Frederika in ER.

In 2004, at age 15, Herrera was cast as Dana Cruz in Zoey 101, the roommate of Zoey Brooks (Jamie Lynn Spears) and Nicole Bristow (Alexa Nikolas). Following the first season, Herrera's character was written out of the series because she kept forgetting her lines, and looked too old for the part. According to Nikolas, who was allegedly being bullied on set, Herrera was also let go after pushing and harassing Nikolas while filming the final episode of season one (Herrera denied this). Herrera's character was then replaced by Lola Martinez (Victoria Justice) for the rest of the series. Despite only appearing in Season 1, Kristin is present for all 13 episodes. Her character is mentioned once by Nicole in Season 2 "Back to PCA" and appeared in flashbacks in season 4's episode 13 "PCA Confidential". She does not appear in any of the Zoey 101 TV Movies.

Herrera also co-starred in feature film Freedom Writers opposite Hilary Swank. In 2008, she stopped taking acting roles. Her last role was on the soap opera General Hospital.

In 2020, Herrera reunited with the Zoey 101 main cast on the television show All That. Nikolas, Justice, and Austin Butler were not present.

== Personal life ==
On July 15, 2016, Herrera announced via Instagram that she was engaged to her longtime boyfriend Daniel Novak. Their engagement ended shortly afterward. However, on February 14, 2020, she announced that she was engaged to Novak again. They got married on October 26, 2022.

On November 17, 2021, she announced on Instagram that she was pregnant with her and Novak's first child. She gave birth to their son on May 23, 2022.

== Filmography ==
=== Film roles ===
Year	Title	Role	Ref.
2007	Freedom Writers	Gloria Munez	
2007	Resurrection Mary	Karen	
2021	The Legend of Resurrection Mary	Karen	

=== Television roles ===
Year	Title	Role	Episode
2001	NYPD Blue	Elena Rodriguez	Episode: "Oh Golly Goth"
2002	7th Heaven	Katie	Episode: "Letting Go"
2002	The Division	Aimee Varga	Episode: "Remembrance"
2002	The Bernie Mac Show	Sophia	Episode: "Bernie Mac Dance Party"
2004	ER	Frederika Meehan	Episode: "The Student"
2004–08	General Hospital	Lourdes Del Torro	Recurring role
2005	Zoey 101	Dana Cruz	Main role (season 1)
2006	Without a Trace	Rose Martinez	Episode: "White Balance"
2020	All That	Herself	Season 11 episode

== Bibliography ==
- Green, Doyle (February 28, 2012). Teens, TV and Tunes: The Manufacturing of American Adolescent Culture. McFarland & Company. p. 229. ISBN 9780786466429.
