= How Could I Want More =

Single by Jamie Lynn Spears

from the album The Journey
- Released: November 26, 2013
- Genre: Country pop
- Length: 3:33
- Label: Sweet Jamie Music, Inc.
- Songwriter(s): Jamie Lynn Spears; Rivers Rutherford
- Producer(s): Corey Crowder

Jamie Lynn Spears singles chronology
"How Could I Want More" (2013)	"Sleepover" (2016)

"How Could I Want More" is the debut single by American actress and singer Jamie Lynn Spears. The song was written by Spears and Rivers Rutherford, and was self-released (under the label name Sweet Jamie Music, Inc.) on November 25, 2013 as the lead single from Spears' debut EP, The Journey. The track received acclaim from music critics, who praised Spears for taking a different musical direction than her sister, and for the maturity expressed in the lyrics and her delivery. Spears wrote the song about her future-husband Jamie Watson.

== Composition ==
"How Could I Want More" is a traditional-style country music ballad that runs for three minutes and thirty-three seconds. The song opens with an acoustic guitar riff, while a pedal steel guitar comes in as the song progresses, resulting in a distinctively country sound. Personal yet relatable lyrics carry a narrative about a seemingly-perfect relationship that still finds the narrator wanting more. Country music critic Billy Dukes (of Taste of Country) noted that the production, particularly the "faint echo" accompanying each note, is effective at masking Spears' unexceptional vocal ability and lending the song an air of authenticity. Spears said her now husband, Jamie Watson inspired the song.

== Critical reception ==
The song was generally well received by critics, who praised Spears for taking a different musical direction than her sister, and for the maturity expressed in the lyrics and her delivery. Us Weekly compared the track favorably to the early work of Taylor Swift and commented that the country twang and overall quality surprised them. Also drawing comparisons to Taylor Swift and Kacey Musgraves, Sam Lansky of Idolator called "How Could I Want More" a "lovely and wistful sigh of country-pop longing" that may not be terribly radio-friendly but is nevertheless "pretty great".

Billy Dukes of Taste of Country highlighted the "sharp, vulnerable lyric" and excellent arrangement in his positive review of the song, while also praising Spears for displaying expectation-defying maturity. Kevin Rutherford of Billboard described Spears' performance as "sweet and innocent" yet powerful, and suggested the song would fit right in at country radio. Ashley Cooke of Roughstock called the song "really good" and left her "excited" about Spears' career.

== Promotion ==
On December 19, 2016, Spears performed the song on NBC's morning television show Today.

== Music video ==
The music video premiered in December 2013. It was directed by Spears' former Zoey 101 co-star Matthew Underwood, who played Logan Reese on the show.

== Chart performance ==
"How Could I Want More" debuted at number 29 on the Billboard Hot Country Songs, and at number 8 on the Country Digital Songs chart, for the week ending December 7, 2013. It has sold 115,000 digital downloads in the US as of May 2014.

== Charts ==
Chart (2013)	Peak position
Canada (Canadian Hot 100)	68
Canada (Hot Canadian Digital Song Sales)	40
UK Indie Songs (Official Charts Company)	27
US Bubbling Under Hot 100 Singles (Billboard)	18
US Heatseekers Songs (Billboard)	21
US Hot Country Songs (Billboard)	29
US Country Airplay (Billboard)	55
US Digital Song Sales (Billboard)	46
US Country Digital Song Sales (Billboard)	8
