= Dance Contest =

Dance Contest may refer to:

- "Dance Contest", a 2007 episode of Drake & Josh
- "Dance Contest", a 2007 episode of Zoey 101
- Eurovision Dance Contest, an international ballroom dancing competition
