= Follow Me (Zoey 101) =

2004 song by Jamie Lynn Spears

Song by Jamie Lynn Spears
- Released: Unreleased
- Recorded: 2004
- Songwriters: Jamie Lynn Spears; Britney Spears

"Follow Me (Zoey 101)"

Single by Jamie Lynn Spears and Chantel Jeffries
- Released: October 22, 2020
- Genre: Electropop; pop
- Length: 3:14
- Label: Republic Records
- Songwriters: Jamie Lynn Spears; Britney Spears; Chantel Jeffries; Christian Karlsson; Henrik Jonback; Josh Cumbee; Pontus Winnberg; Shari Short
- Producers: Chantel Jeffries; Josh Cumbee

"Follow Me" is an unreleased song that served as the theme song for Zoey 101. With Jamie Lynn Spears on vocals, she and her older sister Britney Spears wrote and recorded the song in 2004. Spears and American DJ Chantel Jeffries re-recorded and remixed the theme song, releasing it on October 22, 2020. A Gigi Gorgeous-directed music video for the re-recorded theme song was released a few days later on October 27, 2020, and featured JoJo Siwa, Dixie D'Amelio, Noah Beck, and Sofia Reyes.

== Background and release ==
"Follow Me" was first written and recorded in 2004 by Jamie Lynn Spears and her older sister Britney Spears. Spears was originally too nervous to record the song, but after encouragement from her older sister, she felt comfortable singing. It served as the theme song to Zoey 101, with Spears then playing the lead character from 2005 to 2008. Despite the song being very popular among fans, it was never commercially released. An instrumental version of the song was released on the shows soundtrack album Zoey 101: Music Mix on March 7, 2006.

Because of the COVID-19 pandemic, people had started re-watching their childhood shows, inspiring Spears to re-record the song as fans waited for the reboot of the show she had begun working on. Spears had wanted to rewrite the lyrics of "Follow Me (Zoey 101)" due to writing the original as a young child. Spears recorded a new version of "Follow Me (Zoey 101)" with American DJ Chantel Jeffries over Zoom during the Spring of 2020. They finished remixing the song in a recording studio in Louisiana. The song was later released on October 22, 2020, by Republic Records, and credits Spears and Jeffries as the artists. The song was produced by Jeffries along with American musician Josh Cumbee.

== Music and promotion ==
The re-recording of "Follow Me (Zoey 101)" is an electropop and pop song. According to Heran Mamo of Billboard, the re-recorded "Follow Me (Zoey 101)" had the original theme songs "nostalgic piano keys" and stated it "reassures Spears will always be our girl." The original theme song featured the lyrics, "I'm just another kinda girl/And you wanna see my world/So come and run away", while the re-recorded version had, "You know I'll always be your girl/Together we can see the world/Come on let's run away".

A music video for the re-recorded version of "Follow Me (Zoey 101)", which was directed by Gigi Gorgeous, was released on October 27, 2020. The video was filmed on September 29, 2020, and features parts of the original show with new footage featuring Spears, her daughter, and the original Zoey 101 cast consisting of Erin Sanders, Christopher Massey, Matthew Underwood, and Sean Flynn. The video also features JoJo Siwa, Dixie D'Amelio, Noah Beck, and Sofia Reyes auditioning to be characters in the reboot of Zoey 101. It ends with them dancing at a party with confetti falling while D'Amelio and Beck kiss.

== Reception ==
Dylan Kickham for Elite Daily wrote that the original theme song was an "iconic tune" that "holds a special place in the hearts of millennials". MTV News editor Crystal Bell ranked the original theme song at number three on her The 17 Best Nickelodeon Theme Songs, Ranked list, mentioning that having Britney Spears as a co-writer in the song "automatically put "Follow Me" in the top three". Carolyn Twersky, writing for Seventeen magazine, called the re-recorded version of "Follow Me (Zoey 101)" a "low key bop" and opined it was an "iconic new theme song".

== Credits and personnel ==
October 2020 remix credits adapted from Tidal.

- Jamie Lynn Spears – vocals, songwriter
- Chantel Jeffries – vocals, songwriter, producer
- Josh Cumbee – songwriter, producer, piano, programming
- Britney Spears – songwriter
- Christian Karlsson – songwriter
- Henrik Jonback – songwriter
- Pontus Winnberg – songwriter
- Shari Short – backing vocals, songwriter, vocal producer
- Tony Maserati – mixer
- Dale Becker – mastering engineer
