= Proud (2 Chainz song) =

2018 single by 2 Chainz featuring YG and Offset

Single by 2 Chainz featuring YG and Offset

from the EP The Play Don't Care Who Makes It
- Released: March 6, 2018
- Genre: Hip-hop; trap
- Length: 3:54
- Label: Gamebread; Def Jam
- Songwriter(s): Tauheed Epps; Keenon Jackson; Kiari Cephus; Tyler Williams; Josh Valle; Nayvadius Wilburn; Matthew Samuels; Justin Garner
- Producer(s): T-Minus; Vaiyeh

2 Chainz singles chronology
"Flirt" (2018)	"Proud" (2018)	"Hardaway (Remix)" (2018)

YG singles chronology
"Suu Whoop" (2018)	"Proud" (2018)	"Bool" (2018)

Offset singles chronology
"Ahora Dice (Real Hasta La Muerte Remix)" (2018)	"Proud" (2018)	"Wait" (2018)

Music video
- "Proud" on YouTube

"Proud" is a song by American rapper 2 Chainz featuring American rappers YG and Offset. It was sent to urban contemporary radio on March 6, 2018 as the lead single from 2 Chainz's EP The Play Don't Care Who Makes It (2018). The song was produced by T-Minus and Vaiyeh.

== Composition ==
The production contains "a few plaintive synth squiggles" with a snare and hi-hat beat, while lyrically the rappers reflect on their separate upbringings and relationships with their mothers. 2 Chainz details spending his childhood in a crime-ridden neighborhood with his mother in the first verse. It is respectively followed by verses from YG and Offset, the latter of whom performs in melodic, Auto-Tuned vocals and praises his mother for teaching him how to make money. The three rappers interpolate lyrics from the chorus of the song "My Momma" by Future featuring Wiz Khalifa, especially the line "My momma ain't raise no ho".

== Critical reception ==
Aron A. of HotNewHipHop gave a positive review, writing "YG and Offset bring some fire verses through for the highlight of 2 Chainz latest project. On 'PROUD,' 2 Chainz brings T-Minus to handle the sleek production. The three emcees come through with fire and completely demolish their verses. While the project might only be four songs, 'PROUD' defintely [sic] stands out on the tracklist." Mehan Jayasuriya of Pitchfork wrote that "2 Chainz's guests never get the best of him on 'Proud,' a song that balances toughness, humor, street savvy, and genuine affection. It's hard to imagine another rapper landing the kind of trap song you could bring home to mom."

== Music video ==
An official music video was filmed on March 9, 2018 and released on March 27, 2018. Directed by 2 Chainz and Howard Ross and filmed in Atlanta, it features appearances from the rappers' mothers, who dress like them, lip-sync their verses and dance along with them in various neighborhoods. 2 Chainz's mother wears Gucci sneakers, a gold "Tru" necklace, gold-tinted Tom Ford Olivier shades and a bandana, as she poses next to a classic muscle car. YG's mother wears a red jacket, red bandana around her neck, high black socks, black loafers and dark red lipstick. Offset's mother appears inside a trap house, wearing tinted glasses and a heavy gold "Offset" chain and counting stacks of cash. The clip also shows people holding up signs with the song's lyrics, like "My Momma Ain't Raise No Ho" and "I'm Just Tryna Make My Momma Proud." The rappers and their mothers come together in the ending in front of the burned down house.

== Live performances ==
On May 10, 2018, 2 Chainz and YG performed the song on Jimmy Kimmel Live!, with their mothers appearing onstage alongside them.

== Charts ==
Chart (2018)	Peak position
US Billboard Hot 100	96
US Hot R&B/Hip-Hop Songs (Billboard)	43
US Rhythmic (Billboard)	34

== Certifications ==
Region	Certification	Certified units/sales
United States (RIAA)	Gold	500,000^{‡}
^{‡} Sales+streaming figures based on certification alone.
