= Chantel Jeffries =

American DJ and influencer (b. 1992)

- Also known as: Ceejay; Ceejay the DJ; CJ; CJ the DJ
- Born: Chantel Taleen Jeffries; September 30, 1992 (age 34); Coronado, California, U.S.
- Origin: Los Angeles, California, U.S.
- Genres: EDM; dance-pop; house
- Occupations: Disc jockey; record producer; model; social media personality; actress
- Instrument: Digital audio workstation
- Years active: 2013–present
- Labels: 10:22pm

Chantel Taleen Jeffries (born September 30, 1992), is an American DJ, model, and YouTube personality. She released her 2018 single, "Wait" (featuring Vory and Offset), through Universal Music Group's record label 10:22pm. The song peaked at No. 10 on the Billboard Hot Dance/Electronic Songs chart. She is best known for her association with Canadian singer Justin Bieber.

== Early life and education ==
Jeffries was born Chantel Taleen Jeffries on September 30, 1992, in Coronado, California. Her parents are Colonel Edward Jeffries and Kathleen Jeffries. She is of mixed African-American, French, Cherokee, Irish and Italian descent.

== Music career ==
=== 2018–present: Calculated Luck ===
Shortly after being signed to the Universal Music Group label at 10:22 pm, it was announced that Jeffries would release her debut single on May 4, 2018. The track features hip-hop rappers Offset and Vory, who came by and heard the track and wanted to "lay some melodies." "Wait" was officially released on May 4, 2018. A vertical music video for the single was released on June 5, 2018. Jeffries released her second single, "Both Sides", on July 13, 2018, featuring Vory. A third single was released on August 10, 2018, called "Better". It featured hip-hop rapper BlocBoy JB and Vory. On February 1, 2019, Jeffries released her fourth single "Facts", which features hip-hop rappers YG, Rich the Kid, and BIA. A lyric video was released the same day. In 2020, Jeffries released her new single, "Follow Me", which its song sampled the theme song of the 2005-08 Nickelodeon teen drama.

== Discography ==
=== Singles ===
Title	Year	Peak chart positions		Album
Title	Year	US Dance	US Dance Digital	Album
"Wait" (featuring Vory & Offset)	2018	10	4	Non-album singles
"Both Sides" (featuring Vory)	2018	—	—	Non-album singles
"Better" (featuring BlocBoy JB & Vory)	2018	32	—	Non-album singles
"Facts" (featuring YG, Rich The Kid & BIA)	2019	—	—	Non-album singles
"Chase the Summer" (featuring Jeremih)	2019	—	—	Non-album singles
"Come Back to Me" (featuring Shaylen)	2020	—	—	Non-album singles
"Follow Me (Zoey 101)" (with Jamie Lynn Spears)	2020	—	—	Non-album singles
