= Wait (Chantel Jeffries song) =

Single by Chantel Jeffries featuring Offset and Vory

from the album Calculated Luck
- Released: May 4, 2018
- Genre: Dance
- Length: 2:50
- Label: 10:22 pm
- Songwriters: Louis Bell; Kiari Kendrell Cephus; Chantel Jeffries; Vory
- Producers: Bell; Jeffries

Chantel Jeffries singles chronology
"Wait" (2018)	"Both Sides" (2018)

Offset singles chronology
"Proud" (2018)	"Wait" (2018)	"Taste" (2018)

"Wait" is the first single by the American producer Chantel Jeffries. It was released for digital download on May 2, 2018, as the first single from her first extended play, Calculated Luck, by the Universal Music Group label, 10:22 pm. The track has guest vocals from the American rappers Offset and Vory.

== Background ==
Shortly after being signed to 10:22 pm, it was announced that Jeffries would release a single on May 4, 2018. The track features the American rappers Offset and Vory, who heard the track and wanted to "lay some melodies".

We were in the studio producing the track, and Vory was also in his studio in another session. He came by and he heard the song, and he was like, 'Do you mind if I lay some melodies on this? Do you have anyone doing melodies?' I was like, no, not yet, just working on it. He started going through recording some melodies, and I'm like, why don't you say this, why don't you say that. He started writing with me and Lou in the room, and we just kind of finished it all in one sitting. From there, it was just me thinking of, OK, who can I bring on that would be a great juxtaposition but also someone that can make the song appealing to a lot more people. I went through a list of people that I like, and I talked to a lot people that I value their music opinion, and from that I got the idea of Offset.

== Music video ==
A vertical music video for "Wait" was released on June 5, 2018. The official music video was released but later deleted after fans complained that it featured Alissa Violet and her ex-boyfriend Jake Paul.

== Charts ==
=== Weekly charts ===
Chart (2018)	Peak position
US Hot Dance/Electronic Songs (Billboard)	10

=== Year-end charts ===
Chart (2018)	Position
US Hot Dance/Electronic Songs (Billboard)	73
