= The Journey (Jamie Lynn Spears EP) =

EP by Jamie Lynn Spears
- Released: May 27, 2014
- Recorded: 2013–2014
- Genre: Country pop
- Length: 17:00
- Label: Sweet Jamie Music
- Producer: Corey Crowder

Singles from The Journey
- 1. "How Could I Want More" Released: November 26, 2013

The Journey is the debut extended play by American country singer Jamie Lynn Spears. "How Could I Want More" was released as the album's lead single on November 26, 2013 by Sweet Jamie Music, Inc. On May 13, 2014, Spears released teasers of four new songs ("Shotgun Wedding", "Mandolin Summer Sun", "Big Bad World", and "Run") on her Instagram account with the hashtag, "JLSTheJourney." The Journey was released on May 27, 2014. Its lead single "How Could I Want More" has gained 7 million streams on spotify and is her most streamed song.

== Background ==
For a couple of years prior to the release of The Journey Spears had spent time writing songs, working with different producers, demoing songs, and "trying to figure out what the exact sound" that she wanted to put into the EP. Spears stated that her first impression as an artist was important to her. She said of her fans, "My fans have been so supportive, and have been so patient for me to get the music to them. They have heard all the YouTube clips, and my live shows, but they deserve to have something they can listen to in the car." Spears wrote the opening track "Shotgun Wedding" with Chris Tompkins in 2008 or 2009. She cites it as one of the first songs she ever wrote and represents the beginning stage of her music career. The second track "Run" Spears says originated from a conversation she had with some of her co-writers about how hot it was outside which eventually turned into a song. Spears says the song reminds her of "being on the river, summertime, just being with the person you love, and just having a good time." The lead single from the EP "How Could I Want More" was inspired by Spears' husband and is what she describes as "personal and special". "Mandolin Summer Sun" is what Spears describes as a happy song and is about "letting things go, not being so serious, enjoying life, and that innocence, and that fun time in the summer." The final track "Big Bad World" was written with Chris Tompkins. It was written when Spears was in a lonely time in her life and is meant to be encouraging to listeners.

== Track listing ==
No.	Title	Writer(s)	Length
1.	"Shotgun Wedding"	Jamie Lynn Spears, Tyler Hayes, Chris Tompkins	3:32
2.	"Run"	Spears, Lisa Carver, Corey Crowder, Liz Rose	4:06
3.	"How Could I Want More"	Spears, Rivers Rutherford	3:33
4.	"Mandolin Summer Sun"	Spears, Carver, Crowder, Rose	2:54
5.	"Big Bad World"	Spears, Rose, Tompkins	3:22

== Chart performance ==
Chart (2014)	Peak position
US Billboard 200	193
US Top Country Albums (Billboard)	24
US Heatseekers Albums (Billboard)	5
US Independent Albums (Billboard)	25
