= The Piper Downs =

American alternative rock band

- Origin: Los Angeles, California
- Genres: Alternative rock
- Instrument(s): Guitar, bass, drums
- Years active: 1996–2016
- Members: Bobby Bognar; Garner Knutson; Yell McGuyer; Ellen McGuyer
- Past members: Chris Novicki; Mike Neiland; Mike Fasano; John Key; Jason Rarick

The Piper Downs are a four-piece alternative rock band from Los Angeles, California.

== Band history ==
The band met while students at Virginia Commonwealth University, and then moved to Los Angeles. Bobby Bognar was the frontman for the Richmond, Virginia band Hanover Fiske. Upon the breakup of Hanover Fiske, Bognar decided to move to Los Angeles to pursue a solo music career. In 1994, Bognar returned home for the holidays and spent time with Knutson and Yell, who were the guitarists of Richmond band The Distractions. Excited by the musical chemistry, the two Distractions moved to Los Angeles with Bognar to form Bobby Bognar and the Distractions. After releasing 1995's First Time and 1997's Heed, the band changed their name to The Piper Downs (a reference from the movie So I Married an Axe Murderer).

== Music career ==
In 1999, the band released the Rock Juice EP, which showcased, among other things, the magnificent and swirling bass solos for which Yell has become known.

In 2002, they released their single, I Am a Dick, which became one of their most popular songs.

2006, saw the release of their album, Varying Degrees of Failure and Tunelessness, which introduced their most popular song to date, "Louder", and three music videos.

2012 they released their second single, Mindset.

2015 they released their most recent and final album titled, Heartbreak's a Disease.

The band has a guitar as part of the Hard Rock Cafe permanent memorabilia collection, have twice been named the "Best Unsigned Band in Los Angeles," appeared on radio, movies, and television shows, headlined the local stage at the Vans Warped Tour, and opened for Sammy Hagar in Cabo San Lucas, Mexico. The Downs were named the "Best New Band in America" by the Global Battle of the Bands GBOB, and came in fourth in the world competition held in London, England.

The Piper Downs have toured all across the US, in England, Mexico, and Australia.

Their single "Louder" is featured on the Zoey 101 soundtrack, Zoey 101: Music Mix, released by Sony Records.

The band eventually built their own in-home studio and recorded singles that they released on their website.

They broke up due to personal issues between the members in 2016.

== Discography ==
EPs

- Rock Juice (1999)

LPs

- Varying Degrees of Failure and Tunelessness - LP (2002)
- Heartbreak's a Disease (2015)

Singles

- Valentine
- Oh Come All Ye Faithfull
- UWant - Web Exclusive (January 2004)
- If That's What You Want (Figgs cover) - Web Exclusive (April 2004)
- Centerfold (J. Geils Band cover) - Web Exclusive (May 2003)
- Your Man - Web Exclusive (June 2003)
- Give it Up - Web Exclusive (September 2003)
