= The Play Don't Care Who Makes It =

EP by 2 Chainz
- Released: February 8, 2018
- Recorded: 2017
- Genre: Trap
- Length: 16:10
- Label: Gamebread; Def Jam
- Producer: J. Valle; June James; Nonstop Da Hitman; Streetrunner; T-Minus; Tarik Azzouz; The Hit Cartel

2 Chainz chronology
Pretty Girls Like Trap Music (2017)	The Play Don't Care Who Makes It (2018)	Rap or Go to the League (2019)

Singles from The Play Don't Care Who Makes It
- 1. "Proud" Released: March 6, 2018

The Play Don't Care Who Makes It is the fourth extended play (EP) by American rapper 2 Chainz. It was released on February 8, 2018, by Def Jam Recordings. It features guest appearances from YG and Offset. It was also produced by T-Minus, June James, Nonstop Da Hitman, and Streetrunner, among others.

== Background ==
On February 6, 2018, 2 Chainz teased on social media that new music was on its way. Two days later, 2 Chainz revealed the EP's title, tracklist and release date, which was then released on the same day.

== Critical reception ==
Professional ratings
Review scores
Source	Rating
Pitchfork	7.5/10
HipHopDX	3.7/5

Briana Younger of Pitchfork stated: "On his reflective four-song EP, the Atlanta rapper’s hallmark frivolity and infinite swag keep it short and sweet."

Trent Clark of HipHopDX stated: "TPDCWMI doesn't manifest any all-time 2 Chainz greatest material nor will it cause any shakeups in the current industry." Praising the artist by stating "Such a ruminative number really sheds light on 2 Chainz's OG status, as well as his versatility as an artist, which often gets overlooked being that he’s so adept in Pyrex poetry."

== Track listing ==
Credits adapted from Tidal.

The Play Don't Care Who Makes It
No.	Title	Writer(s)	Producer(s)	Length
1.	"OK Bitch"	Tauheed Epps; June James; Julian Mason; Ramiro Morales	June James; The Hit Cartel	3:11
2.	"Proud" (featuring YG and Offset)	Epps; Tyler Williams; Keenon Jackson; Kiari Cephus; Joshua Valle; Matthew Samuels; Nayvadius Wilburn; Michael Williams II; Justin Garner; Cameron Thomaz	T-Minus; J. Valle^{[a]}	3:54
3.	"Land of the Freaks"	Epps; Gary Fountaine	Nonstop Da Hitman	3:41
4.	"Lamborghini Truck (Atlanta Shit)"	Epps; Nicholas Warwar; Tarik Azzouz; Sitara Kanhai	Streetrunner; Tarik Azzouz	5:24
Total length:				16:10

Notes

- ^{^[a]} signifies a co-producer
- "Lamborghini Truck (Atlanta Shit)" features additional vocals from Sitara Kanhai

Sample credits

- "Proud" contains an interpolation from "My Momma", performed by Future featuring Wiz Khalifa.

== Personnel ==
Credits adapted from Tidal.

Performers

- 2 Chainz – rapping
- YG – rapping (track 2)
- Offset – rapping (track 2)

Technical

- Nolan Presley – record engineering (all tracks)
- Finis "KY" White – mixing (all tracks)
- Glenn Schick – mastering (all tracks)

Production

- June James – production (track 1)
- The Hit Cartel – production (track 1)
- T-Minus – production (track 2)
- J. Valle – co-production (track 2)
- Nonstop – production (track 3)
- Cassius Jay – additional production (track 3)
- Streetrunner – production (track 4)
- Tarik Azzouz – production (track 4)

== Charts ==
Chart (2018)	Peak position
US Billboard 200	58
US Top R&B/Hip-Hop Albums (Billboard)	27
