= Paul Butcher (American football) =

American football player (born 1963)

No. 96, 59, 53
- Position: Linebacker

Personal information
- Born: November 8, 1963 (age 62); Detroit, Michigan, U.S.
- Listed height: 6 ft 0 in (1.83 m)
- Listed weight: 230 lb (104 kg)

Career information
- High school: St. Alphonsus
- College: Wayne State (MI)
- NFL draft: 1986: undrafted
- Expansion draft: 1995: 27th round, 54th overall pick

Career history
- Detroit Lions (1986–1988); Philadelphia Eagles (1989)*; Los Angeles Rams (1989–1992); Indianapolis Colts (1993–1994); Carolina Panthers (1995); Oakland Raiders (1996)
- * Offseason or practice squad member only

Career NFL statistics
- Tackles: 69
- Fumble recoveries: 3
- Stats at Pro Football Reference

Paul Martin Butcher (born November 8, 1963) is an American former professional football player who was a linebacker in the National Football League (NFL) for eleven years, until he retired from the Oakland Raiders. He also played for the Detroit Lions, Los Angeles Rams, Indianapolis Colts, and he was selected by the Carolina Panthers in the 1995 NFL expansion draft. He played college football at Wayne State University. Butcher was the Special Teams coach of the XFL's New York/New Jersey Hitmen. He is married to Jacqueline Ricottone and their son is Nickelodeon actor Paul Butcher (b. 1994).
