= Zoey 101 =

American comedy-drama television series (2005–2008)

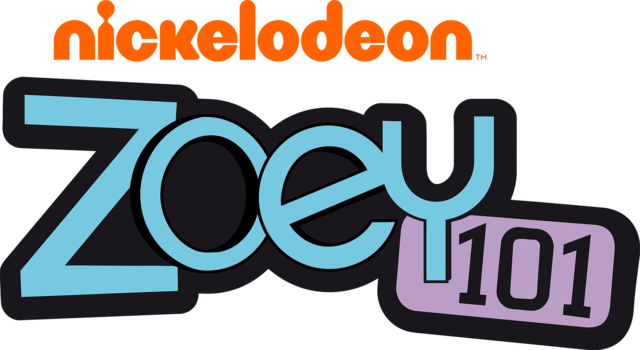
- Genre: Comedy-drama; Teen sitcom
- Created by: Dan Schneider
- Showrunner: Dan Schneider
- Starring: Jamie Lynn Spears; Paul Butcher; Sean Flynn; Kristin Herrera; Christopher Massey; Alexa Nikolas; Erin Sanders; Matthew Underwood; Victoria Justice; Austin Butler
- Theme music composer: Britney Spears; Christian Karlsson; Pontus Winnberg; Henrik Jonback
- Opening theme: "Follow Me" by Jamie Lynn Spears
- Ending theme: "Follow Me" by Jamie Lynn Spears
- Composers: Eric Coester (season 1-3); Michael Corcoran (season 4)
- Country of origin: United States
- Original language: English
- No. of seasons: 4
- No. of episodes: 61 (list of episodes)

Production
- Executive producers: Dan Schneider; Bill O'Dowd; Jan Korbelin (episodes 1–15); Jörg Westerkamp (episodes 16–61); George Doty IV (season 4)
- Producers: Joe Catania; Tom Keniston (season 4)
- Production location: Pepperdine University
- Cinematography: Wayne Kennan ("Welcome to PCA"); Mike Spodnik
- Running time: 23–25 minutes
- Production companies: Schneider's Bakery; ApolloProMovie; Nickelodeon Productions

Original release
- Network: Nickelodeon
- Release: January 9, 2005 – May 2, 2008

Zoey 101 is an American teen situational comedy-drama television series created by Dan Schneider for Nickelodeon. It aired from January 9, 2005, to May 2, 2008, spanning a total of 61 episodes across four seasons.

It focuses on the lives of Zoey Brooks (Jamie Lynn Spears), her brother, Dustin (Paul Butcher), and her friends as they attend Pacific Coast Academy, a fictional boarding school in Southern California.

It was initially filmed at Pepperdine University in Malibu, California, then at stages in Valencia beginning in the third season. It was nominated for an "Outstanding Children's Program" Emmy in 2005. Zoey 101 was the most expensive production ever for a Nickelodeon standard, as it was shot completely on location in Malibu itself.

The series won three Young Artist Awards, two Nickelodeon Kids' Choice Awards and a Neox Fan Award.

A soundtrack and several video games based on the series have also been released. In July 2023, a film, Zoey 102, was released on Paramount+.

== Premise ==
The series centers around Zoey Brooks as she enrolls in Pacific Coast Academy, a prestigious Southern California boarding school that previously only allowed boys to attend. Throughout the series, Zoey and her new friends navigate life as teenagers. As the series progresses, the group of friends grow closer together; some are platonic, others not so much.

== Episodes ==
Season	Episodes	Originally released	
Season	Episodes	First released	Last released
1	13	January 9, 2005	May 1, 2005
2	12	September 10, 2005	April 30, 2006
3	23	September 24, 2006	January 4, 2008
4	13	January 27, 2008	May 2, 2008

== Cast ==
- Jamie Lynn Spears as Zoey Brooks
- Paul Butcher as Dustin Brooks
- Sean Flynn as Chase Matthews (seasons 1–3; guest, season 4)
- Kristin Herrera as Dana Cruz (season 1)
- Christopher Massey as Michael Barret
- Alexa Nikolas as Nicole Bristow (seasons 1–2)
- Erin Sanders as Quinn Pensky
- Matthew Underwood as Logan Reese
- Victoria Justice as Lola Martinez (seasons 2–4)
- Austin Butler as James Garrett (season 4) (Note: Austin Butler is credited as a series regular from "Rumor of Love" to "Chasing Zoey".)

== Production ==
=== Development ===
In 2002, Dan Schneider first had Jamie Lynn Spears audition for him at the age of 11 years old, after an executive at Nickelodeon asked if he would like to meet with Britney Spears' sister. At this time, All That had just revamped its cast, and he knew that casting Britney's younger sister "would bring a lot of attention to 'All That,' and it would be a good thing. [He] was just hoping she'd be good." On September 21, 2002, Jamie Spears, as she was originally credited, made her debut on Nickelodeon in the premiere of Season 8 of All That. Midway through Season 9, in late 2003, Schneider had a meeting with another executive at the network who wanted to know if Schneider had any ideas for a spin-off series that could be built around Spears, like how Kenan & Kel, The Amanda Show, and The Nick Cannon Show were built around their stars. According to Schneider, the show was completely "custom made" for Jamie Lynn, and her mother Lynne "had a lot of input."

In August 2003, Spears officially signed a development deal with Nickelodeon in which she would star as the protagonist in her own scripted television series that would air on the network. Spears stated that she can still vividly recall her first meeting to talk about this show, if only for the setting: Houston's in Santa Monica, her favorite at the time. "We had dinner, and we talked about what Zoey should be like," she says. "I just remember it being really important to me that Zoey had a tomboy side to her because that's who I was. I was 11 or 12 years old, so I didn't really have much opinion [on the business side] but I definitely wanted her to be very strong and confident. I do remember that."

As the show began casting, Paul Butcher was hired to play opposite Zoey as her younger brother Dustin Brooks. Actress Erin Sanders had auditioned for Nicole, the part of Zoey's best-friend and roommate, but the role was eventually offered to Alexa Nikolas. Keeping Sanders in mind, Schneider created the character of Quinn Pensky just for her. Sean Flynn was hired to play Zoey's will-they-won't-they love interest Chase Matthews. Rounding out the cast were Kristin Herrera as Dana Cruz, Christopher Massey as Michael Barret, and Matthew Underwood as Logan Reese.

Kristin Herrera exited after the first season and was replaced by Victoria Justice for the rest of the series. Alexa Nikolas exited after the second season, following numerous fights and incidents with Jamie Lynn Spears, and her character Nicole was written out of the series. In August 2005, it was reported that Britney Spears confronted Nikolas about the feud. Sean Flynn exited after the third season and was replaced by Austin Butler for the rest of the series. Flynn stated in an interview that the reason for his departure was to focus on his education at the time.

=== Filming ===
Pepperdine University in Malibu, California, was used for the first and second seasons, causing the series to become Nickelodeon's most expensive show ever made.

The series began filming in the summer of 2004. According to Sally McIlwain, who oversaw filming and reservations in the Special Programs office of Pepperdine, the school received $350,000 to let the production film there. Two student lounges in the Rockwell Towers Building at Pepperdine were converted into the show's dormitories, a room larger than the average dorm room had to be used in order to fit all the production equipment. Joslyn Plaza, and the exterior of Elkins Auditorium, were both heavily utilized; additionally, the Howard A. White Center (HAWC) was also used for filming. Beyond the outside locations, some of the Lovernich apartments at the university were turned into makeshift production offices for Schneider's Bakery.

Once the summer semester began, production was limited to where they could film, only being permitted to use one lounge in Tower 6 of Rockwell, in addition to Alumni Park and the Hahn Fireside Room. The usage of the campus by production did draw some minor complaints from some students and staff of the university. Specifically, they were upset about the number of parking spaces being taken up by production, and the occasional reroute around campus they had to take to avoid filming. McIlwain revealed steps had been taken to ensure filming would be scheduled around the needs of the real students. Filming was limited around residential areas, and had to begin at 10 a.m., as opposed to the normal 7 a.m., to accommodate any sleeping students. Each day they had to finish filming by 10 p.m. To address the parking issue, production vehicles were moved away to other locations on campus so the students indisposed to the filming. Filming at Pepperdine for season one ended on September 17, with production moving off campus September 21.

The second season began filming at Pepperdine in early May 2005. During the summer, production had a harder time because Battle of the Network Reality Stars began filming there. Pepperdine was integral for Zoey 101, so they had to put up with sharing the space with Battle of the Network Reality Stars, which returned to the university because the original series, Battle of the Network Stars, had been filmed there in the 1970s and 1980s. The competition show filmed on campus from June 4 through June 9, causing a relatively short disruption. McIlwain estimated the university was paid $500,000 for the second season. The second season also included more involvement from Pepperdine students; some were able to join production as interns and receive college credit, while others were hired as background actors and extras. The success of the show's first season meant paparazzi would sneak onto campus trying to photograph Britney Spears when she visited set. Filming on campus for the second season finished on August 17, 2005.

Following the network renewing the series for a 26-episode third season, production had to look for a new filming location since it was not feasible to film at Pepperdine outside of the summer months, and it wasn't possible to film twenty-six episodes in the time they had. After searching up and down the coast, and not finding anything that could work as a stand-in for Pacific Coast Academy, the production team began to look inland. When Karen Fisher, the senior director of production for Nickelodeon, couldn't find anything that would work, she called on David Diamond, who pointed her towards the Mann Biomedical Park in the Santa Clarita Valley, which was built by Lockheed to resemble a college campus. "When we drove onto the property it was beautiful. We were surrounded by tall trees and because the structure was built around the same time as Pepperdine, there were enough similarities to make it work,” said Fisher. The Mann Biomedical Park also featured the same type of exterior walkway lighting as Pepperdine, which meant less work for production. The location had extensive warehouses which could be converted into makeshift soundstages, giving production ample space to recreate the interiors of Pepperdine with sets. The last obstacle came when it was time to recreate the beach, but the business park featured a parking lot on top of a hill. “It's really a beautiful space and what's interesting is that the parking lot is on an elevated spot looking into the skyline,” said Fisher. “You buy that there is ocean out there.” Mann Biomedical Park also featured a basketball court, and several tree lined walkways for production to use.

After shooting its final season, the series officially ended production in August 2007. In October, the Zoey 101 staff learned about Spears's pregnancy. The final season began airing in January 2008. Spears' pregnancy made this season controversial in public opinion, including due to a popular mistaken belief that the show had been cancelled due to her pregnancy.

=== Production difficulties ===
Allegations of conflicts on-set began in August 2005, when reports surfaced that Britney Spears confronted Alexa Nikolas and proceeded to scream at her, calling her an "evil little girl" and telling her to "...watch herself or she will never work in this town again!" A representative from the Spears family later confirmed the confrontation, and said that Britney "...felt she was sticking up for her sister." Following the confrontation with Spears, Nikolas was brought into a meeting at Nickelodeon on Sunset with Dan Schneider and executives from both Nickelodeon and Viacom, where Nikolas claims she was gaslighted for the duration, prompting her to depart from Nickelodeon after the show's second season.

In December 2007, Jamie Lynn Spears revealed to OK! magazine that she was three months pregnant, with the father being her boyfriend Casey Aldridge. Some parents of viewers were furious, and shortly after they began demanding Nickelodeon not air the fourth season, as they saw it as a bad influence on their children. Many parents were upset, unsure of how to discuss the topic with their children. In response to the criticism, an episode of Nick News was planned to be made surrounding the topic of teen pregnancy, which would have given the network a chance to address the issue with children in a non-fiction setting, but was quietly cancelled.

In January 2022, Jamie Lynn Spears released her autobiography Things I Should Have Said. Spears claimed that Nikolas was a bully, and said that she had no memory of "...ever bullying anyone." On January 28, Britney Spears denounced various claims in her sister's book on Instagram, saying "[you're] lying, just like you lied about Alexa Nikolas!" Shortly after, Nikolas confirmed that Britney had reached out to apologize for the August 2005 confrontation. Christopher Massey contradicted both women, saying "Bullying was not a thing... [there was] definitely no bullying on the set." Later in the same year, Nikolas revealed that during her time on set, she additionally stated that she "did not feel safe" around Schneider, alleging that she was pressured to wear revealing clothing, and that he inappropriately responded to her complaints about Spears screaming at her.

== Home media ==
Paramount Home Entertainment released the first season on DVD in Region 1 (United States only). Seasons 2, 3, and 4 were released exclusively through Amazon.com's CreateSpace service. Alliance Home Entertainment has released the first three seasons on DVD in Canada only. Season 3 was released on March 8, 2011. In Region 4, Madman Entertainment has released the first two seasons on DVD in Australia.

DVD Name	Ep #	Release dates		
DVD Name	Ep #	Region 1 (U.S.)	Region 1 (Canada)	Region 4
The Complete 1st Season	13	February 13, 2007	November 23, 2010	July 25, 2006
The Complete 2nd Season	13	August 29, 2008	January 11, 2011	September 11, 2008
The Complete 3rd Season	26	June 16, 2009	March 8, 2011	N/A
The Complete 4th Season	13	June 16, 2009	June 16, 2009	N/A

== Reception ==
=== Critical response ===
The series received positive reviews from its target demographic, scoring high with younger audiences. The series premiere was Nickelodeon's best performance for a series premiere (live action or animation) in almost eight years. The series finale "Chasing Zoey" became the highest-rated live-action show ever on Nickelodeon, with over 7.3 million viewers; additionally, it also beat out American Idol as the highest-rated show in the teens 12–17 demographic. Common Sense Media gave the show a 3/5 rating. On Rotten Tomatoes, the first season has an 80% rating based on reviews from 5 critics.

Criticisms of the show have come from older audiences, including claims that the show is unrealistic.

"I think it's important that something be done... But I think it's important that it be done in a measured way, and not just to feed the beast of news stories."

— Linda Ellerbee

Nickelodeon initially declined to reveal whether Spears would be returning to the network, but publicly supported her. New York Daily News television critic David Hinckley labeled Spears' pregnancy a "sordid moment" for Nickelodeon, and added "if [they keep] Jamie Lynn Spears because her product sells, it runs the risk that a valuable message it has spent years crafting could shift from 'trust us' to 'whatever'."

On January 3, 2008, the night before the third-season finale, the executive vice president of corporate communications for Nickelodeon, Dan Martinsen, revealed the network had no intention of shelving the fourth and final season – which had finished production before Spears announced her pregnancy – and it would premiere later that month as scheduled; Martinsen would not comment on if the network had been receiving any complaints. The season finale "Goodbye Zoey?", the first episode to air after Spears revealed her pregnancy, received a record-breaking 7.27 million viewers tuning into watch. The season-four premiere later that month also continued high ratings, becoming the second- and third-most-watched show on cable for the week of January 21 through January 27.

=== Awards and accolades ===
Awards and honors for Zoey 101
Year	Award	Category	Recipient	Result	Ref.
2005	Teen Choice Awards	Choice TV Breakout Show	Zoey 101	Nominated	
2005	Primetime Emmy Awards	Outstanding Children's Program	Zoey 101	Nominated	
2005	Casting Society of America	Best Casting — Children's Programming	Sharon Chazin Lieblein	Nominated	
2006	Young Artist Awards	Best Young Ensemble Performance In A TV Series (Comedy or Drama)	Sean Flynn; Paul Butcher; Kristin Herrera; Victoria Justice; Christopher Massey; Alexa Nikolas; Erin Sanders; Jamie Lynn Spears; Matthew Underwood	Won	
2007	2007 Australian Kids' Choice Awards	Fave Nick Show	Zoey 101	Nominated	
2007	Young Artist Awards	Best Family Television Series (Comedy)	Zoey 101	Nominated	
2007	Young Artist Awards	Best Young Ensemble Performance In A TV Series (Comedy or Drama)	Jamie Lynn Spears; Paul Butcher; Sean Flynn; Victoria Justice; Christopher Massey; Alexa Nikolas; Erin Sanders; Matthew Underwood	Won	
2007	Casting Society of America	Best Casting — Children's TV Programming	Krisha Bullock	Nominated	
2008	Young Artist Awards	Best Family Television Series	Zoey 101	Nominated	
2008	Young Artist Awards	Best Young Ensemble Performance In A TV Series	Jamie Lynn Spears; Paul Butcher; Sean Flynn; Victoria Justice; Christopher Massey; Erin Sanders; Matthew Underwood	Nominated	
2008	Casting Society of America	Outstanding Achievement in Casting — Children's Series Programming	Krisha Bullock	Nominated	
2009	2009 Kids' Choice Awards	Favorite TV Show	Zoey 101	Nominated	
2013	Neox Fan Awards	Best Neox Kidz series	Zoey 101	Won	

== Other media ==
=== Soundtrack ===
Zoey 101: Music Mix

Soundtrack album by various artists
- Released: March 7, 2006
- Recorded: 2004–2006
- Genre: Pop rock
- Labels: Nick and Columbia

Zoey 101: Music Mix is the soundtrack album for the series. It was released on March 7, 2006. The album features music of the pop and rock genres. By June 2016, only tracks 2, 4, 9, and 10 were available on iTunes.

==== Track listing ====
No.	Title	Recording Artist(s)	Length
1.	"Follow Me" (Instrumental Version)		1:23
2.	"Predictable"	Good Charlotte	3:10
3.	"Louder"	The Piper Downs	3:58
4.	"Calling All Angels"	Train	4:03
5.	"Mandy"	Jonas Brothers	2:49
6.	"Vacation"	The Go-Go's	3:00
7.	"Permanent Midnite"	Saucy Monky	2:25
8.	"Found Out About You"	Gin Blossoms	3:54
9.	"Highway to Nowhere"	Drake Bell	4:03
10.	"All I Want"	Toad the Wet Sprocket	3:17
11.	"It's True"	Odds Against Tomorrow	2:26
12.	"Okay"	Backhouse Mike	3:32
Total length:			38:00

=== Video games ===
A video game titled Zoey 101 was released in March 2007 for Game Boy Advance. Another game called Zoey 101: Field Trip Fiasco was released on September 11, 2007, for Nintendo DS. Both video games were published by THQ and developed by Barking Lizards and received poor reception and negative reviews from sites such as IGN and Common Sense Media.

Zoey 101 is a mini-game collection. Players must successfully complete each mini-game, then a dare, and then a final challenge. Dares and challenges are randomly chosen from three games in the level. Players can choose to play mini-games freely in the main menu. GameZone awarded the game 4 out of 10, stating that the game was either "boring, frustrating, just plain unfun, or some combination of all three." Nintendo World Report rated the game 2 out of 10, while X-Play rated it one star out of five, with both reviews criticizing the mini-games, graphics and music.

Field Trip Fiasco is about Zoey and her friends taking a field trip to a park. The player controls Zoey by using the D-pad or touch screen to walk or run. The player runs around Pacific Coast Academy completing fetch quests. They involve delivering things to people or collecting objects scattered around the school before time runs out. After finishing a fetch quest, the player plays a mini-game involving hosing off cars or picking up Frisbees. Zoey walks around the national park, talks to the camping club about Native Americans, goes to the library to learn about the park and takes a quiz about a national park.

Jack DeVries of IGN gave the game a 3.5 out of 10 and criticized the game's boring gameplay, bland music and sound, and awkward controls. Mike David reviewed the game for GameZone and gave it a 2.8. It was criticized for its graphics and controls.

=== 10th anniversary short ===
On September 18, 2015, the 10th anniversary of the airing of the season 2 episode "Time Capsule", TeenNick aired a short clip featuring Chase and Michael. In the clip, it becomes apparent that Zoey and Chase have broken up and he is now seeing someone else. When Chase proposes to his current girlfriend Alyssa (Jamie Snow), Michael storms in and informs him of what Zoey said on her DVD from "Time Capsule". The DVD reveals that Zoey suspected Chase's crush on her at the time, even before she went to England, and at some point even thought about getting together with him as she considered him her soulmate, but didn't act on it until after she went to England. This causes Chase, who is still in love with Zoey, to abandon Alyssa to find Zoey, with the clip ending on a cliffhanger.

=== Possible revival ===
After reuniting with many of her former cast mates on All That in late 2019, with the sketch later aired on July 11, 2020, Spears revealed during a podcast in May 2020, that she was interested in developing a possible revival and that discussions had already been underway, but nothing was official at the time as many details of the potential project had yet to be confirmed. In October 2020, the cast made a reunion on TikTok.

=== Sequel film ===
On January 12, 2023, Jamie Lynn Spears announced that production had begun on a sequel film entitled Zoey 102, set to premiere in 2023 on Paramount+, with original series cast members Spears, Sean Flynn, Christopher Massey, Erin Sanders, Matthew Underwood, Jack Salvatore Jr., and Abby Wilde reprising their roles. Production began in January 2023 in Wilmington, North Carolina. Nancy Hower is attached to direct, with Spears attached as executive producer. Principal photography wrapped in February 2023. In May 2023, actors Thomas Lennon, Owen Thiele, and Dean Geyer were cast in the film.

The film was released on July 27, 2023, on Paramount+.
