= Alexa Nikolas =

American actress (born 1992)

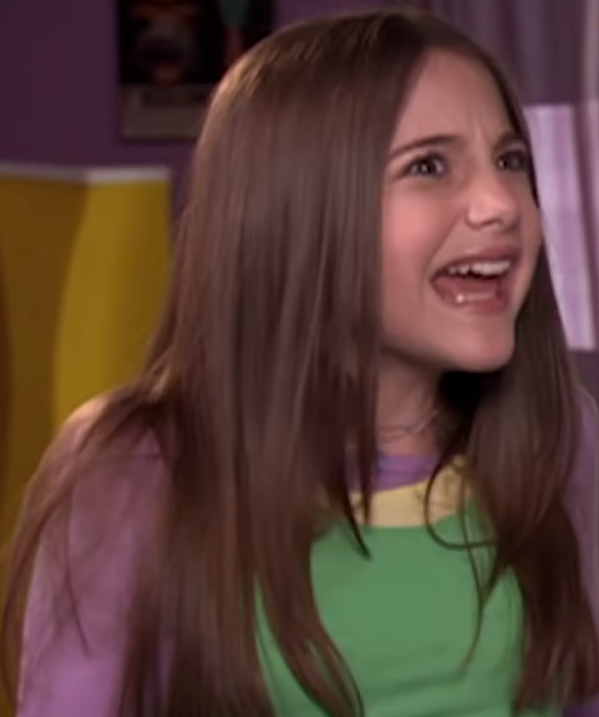
- Nikolas as Nicole Bristow on the Zoey 101 episode "New Roomies" (2005)
- Born: April 4, 1992 (age 34); Chicago, Illinois, U.S.
- Occupations: Actress (formerly); YouTuber; activist
- Years active: 1999–present (Note: Nikolas' tenure as a YouTuber began in the late 2010s, while her time as an actress was from 1999 until 2013.)
- Known for: Zoey 101; Red State
- Spouses: Mike Milosh (m. 2012; div. 2016) Michael Gray (m. 2021)
- Children: 2

Alexa Nikolas (born April 4, 1992) is an American YouTuber and former actress. Nikolas began acting as a child and is best known for her role as Nicole Bristow on the Nickelodeon television series Zoey 101. She also appeared on various other television series, including That's Life, Hidden Hills, Revelations, and The Walking Dead.

Since her retirement from acting, she has founded Eat Predators, a movement that seeks to end predatory behavior in the entertainment industry.

== Career ==
In 2004, at age 12, Nikolas was cast as Nicole Bristow on Zoey 101, alongside Jamie Lynn Spears. In 2006, following the conclusion of the second season, Nikolas exited the series, following numerous fights and incidents with Spears, who claimed she was making up lies about her and suspected she was trying to take over her role on the series. In August 2005, it was reported that Britney Spears confronted Nikolas about the feud. She later alleged Nickelodeon failed to protect her from abuse, saying she "did not feel safe" around the show's creator, Dan Schneider.

In addition, Nikolas appeared on Hidden Hills regularly and also on the 2005 series Revelations. Following her departure from Zoey 101, Nikolas guest starred on various other television series, most notably The Suite Life of Zack & Cody, Judging Amy, ER, Without a Trace, Criminal Minds, Supernatural and Heroes with actress Laura Marano, who played young Alice Shaw, the sister of Nikolas' character, Angela.

In 2011, she appeared in the film Red State as Jesse, and that same year, she appeared on Family Guy as additional voices. Nikolas appeared in three episodes of the television series The Walking Dead – her character, Haley, was introduced in November 2012, before being killed off in February 2013. In 2012, Nikolas starred as Willow in the comedy-horror film Detention of the Dead.

== Personal life ==
Nikolas was born in Chicago, Illinois and is of Greek descent. She moved to Los Angeles when she was 6 years old to pursue an acting career.

She was married to Canadian electronic musician Mike Milosh from 2012 to 2016.

Nikolas has accused Milosh of grooming her for a sexual relationship when she was 16 and he was 33, though states that they did not engage in sex until she turned 18. In August 2021, Nikolas sued Milosh on grounds of sexual battery, gender violence, intentional infliction of emotional distress, and a violation of California's Tom Bane Civil Rights Act. Milosh denied Nikolas's claims and counter-sued, accusing Nikolas of fabricating abuse claims against him after he stopped paying her spousal support.

In May 2022, Nikolas voluntarily dismissed her initial lawsuit against Milosh. Records from a subsequent hearing revealed that on May 17, 2019, the date of their divorce finalization, both parties had entered into a stipulated judgment. This agreement contained a general release of all claims that either party might held against the other. Milosh's lawsuit was stricken in February 2023.

Nikolas has been married to Michael Gray since 2021. The couple have two children.

== Activism ==
In 2022, Nikolas and her organization Eat Predators organized a protest against unsafe working conditions for children, and child predators being protected at Nickelodeon.

Nikolas discusses her strategy as inviting pushback and criticism, saying, "If they want to silence me, it's the whole so-called Streisand Effect, where their usual relentless tactics to silence a survivor just makes it more public."

On July 8, 2023, Nikolas accused actor Jonah Hill of forcibly kissing her at a party at actor Justin Long's house in 2008, when she was 16 and Hill was 24. Speaking through an attorney, Hill denied her accusations, while Long stated he did not know about the incident.

In February 2024, it was announced that Nikolas would appear in the Investigation Discovery documentary Quiet on Set: The Dark Side of Kids TV.

In September 2025, Nikolas filed a federal defamation lawsuit against Kat Tenbarge, a former NBC News journalist. Nikolas accused Tenbarge of falsely stating she had compromised the anonymity of an alleged sexual abuse survivor by leaking sealed court documents and police records. According to Nikolas, the materials she originally shared with Tenbarge were public record and had been appropriately redacted by officials. She also claimed in her complaint, "To advance this false narrative and obtain negative information on Alexa at all costs, Tenbarge facilitated Alexa's stalker's violation of the restraining order issued against him." Nikolas announced the case had been settled in June 2026, at which time Tenbarge issued a lengthy apology via social media and her Spitfire newsletter.

In February 2026, Alexa Nikolas filed a lawsuit against Bryan Freedman, Melissa Nathan, Jed Wallace, and The Agency Group (TAG), alleging they orchestrated a coordinated smear campaign against her. Nikolas claims she discovered the defendants' involvement through discovery documents unsealed in the It Ends With Us controversy and legal disputes, which reportedly detailed a pattern of 'reputational warfare' using anonymous websites. The lawsuit asserts that the campaign was retaliation for Nikolas's public protests against Freedman and her activism regarding survivor rights, intended to undermine her credibility and silence her advocacy. None of the individuals named in Nikolas' lawsuit commented on it.

== Filmography ==
Film roles
Year	Title	Role	Notes
2001	Zoolander	Story Hour Girl	
2002	Ted Bundy	"I'm Ted" Kid	
2003	Tiptoes	Susan Barry	
2004	Motocross Kids	Katie	
2009	Children of the Corn	Ruth	
2011	Red State	Jesse	
2012	Detention of the Dead	Willow	

Television roles
Year	Title	Role	Notes
1999	Love Boat: The Next Wave	Little Girl #1	Episode: "Trances of a Lifetime"
2000–2002	That's Life	Young Lydia	4 episodes
2001	Charmed	Little Girl	Episode: "We All Scream for Ice Cream"
2001	The King of Queens	Young Carrie	Episode: "Veiled Threat"
2002	Even Stevens	Young Ren	Episode: "Band on the Roof"
2002–2003	Hidden Hills	Emily Barber	Main role
2004	Without a Trace	Emily Levine	Episode: "Wannabe"
2005–2006	Zoey 101	Nicole Bristow	Main role (seasons 1–2)
2005	ER	Megan Nesbitt	Episode: "You Are Here"
2005	Judging Amy	Shelly Cecil	Episode: "Happy Borthday"
2005	Revelations	Lucinda "Lucy" Massey	Main role
2005	All That: 10th Anniversary Reunion Special	Herself	Television special
2007	Cold Case	Madison Reed	Episode: "8:03 AM"
2007	The Suite Life of Zack & Cody	Tiffany Dublecini	Episodes: "Miniature Golf", "Who's the Boss?"
2008	CSI: Miami	Mallary Harding	Episode: "To Kill a Predator"
2008	Ghost Whisperer	Caitlin Mahoney	Episode: "Threshold"
2009	Supernatural	Kate Carter	Episode: "Family Remains"
2009	Heroes	Young Angela Shaw	Episode: "1961"
2009	Drop Dead Diva	Hannah Porter	Episode: "The Magic Bullet"
2009	Raising the Bar	Caitlin	Episode: "Maybe, Baby"
2010	Criminal Minds	Jane McBride	Episode: "The Fight"
2011	Lie to Me	Amanda Dobar	Episode: "Funhouse"
2011	Family Guy	Voice: Crying Teen Girl	Episode: "Brothers & Sisters"
2012–2013	The Walking Dead	Haley	Episodes: "Hounded", "Made to Suffer" and "The Suicide King"
2013	Mad Men	Wendy	Episode: "The Crash"
2024	Quiet on Set: The Dark Side of Kids TV	Herself	Documentary series; Episode: "Too Close to the Sun"

Music video roles
Year	Title	Artist(s)	Ref.
2006	"Come Back to Me"	Vanessa Hudgens	
2013	"Slow Down"	Milosh	
2013	"This Time"	Milosh	

== Awards and nominations ==
Year	Award	Category	Work	Result	Refs
2005	Young Artist Awards	Best Performance in a Feature Film — Young Ensemble Cast (shared with Motocross Kids cast)	Motocross Kids	Nominated	
2006	Young Artist Awards	Best Young Ensemble Performance in a TV Series (shared with Zoey 101 cast)	Zoey 101	Won	
2007	Young Artist Awards	Best Young Ensemble Performance in a TV Series (shared with Zoey 101 cast)	Zoey 101	Won	
