= Paul Butcher (actor) =

American actor (born 1994)

- Born: Paul Matthew Hawke Butcher; February 14, 1994 (age 32); Orange County, California, U.S.
- Occupations: Actor; singer
- Years active: 2001–present
- Father: Paul Butcher

Paul Matthew Hawke Butcher (born February 14, 1994) is an American actor. From 2005 to 2008, he played Dustin Brooks in Zoey 101.

== Early life ==
Paul Matthew Hawke Butcher was born on February 14, 1994 in Orange County, California to Jacqueline (née Ricottone) and former football player Paul Butcher. He is of Italian, Hungarian, German, and Croatian descent.

== Career ==
Butcher portrayed Dustin Brooks, the younger brother of lead character Zoey Brooks, for four seasons of the Nickelodeon comedy series Zoey 101. He has had guest and other minor roles for a number of movies and TV shows, one of the most notable roles being a guest star in the season 5 premiere of Criminal Minds. He also played the role of young Walter in the 2007 film The Number 23. He made his acting debut at age 7 on a 2001 episode of The Bernie Mac Show. At the age of 5, Butcher appeared in the music video for "Prayin' for Daylight" by Rascal Flatts. He also was an extra in four sketches on Chappelle's Show.

== Filmography ==
Year	Title	Role	Notes
2001	Nico'adventures	Philip Albert	Voice role
2002	Six Feet Under	5-Year-Old Boy	Episode: "The Secret"
2002	The Santa Trap	Brian Spivak	Television film
2002	The Parkers	Child	Episode: "The Mourning After"
2003	That '70s Show	Little boy #2	Episode: "Christmas"
2003	ER	Paul Dressler	Episode: "When Night Meets Day"
2004	NYPD Blue	Eddie Cown	Episode: "The 3-H Club"
2004	The Incredibles: When Danger Calls	Classmate #1	Voice role Video game
2005	Medical Investigation	Tim Wayne	Episode: "Mousetrap"
2005	Bones	Shawn Cook	Episode: "A Boy in a Bush"
2005, 2020	All That	Himself	2 episodes, including the "10th Anniversary Reunion Special".
2005–2008	Zoey 101	Dustin Brooks	Main role
2005–2007	Avatar: The Last Airbender	Various	Voice role; 2 episodes
2005–2008	King of the Hill	Kenny / Caleb / Robin / Arrow Kid #2	Recurring voice role, 5 episodes
2006	Over the Hedge	Skeeter	Film; voice role
2006	He's a Bully, Charlie Brown	Roy / Kid	Television special; voice role
2006	Ice Age: The Meltdown	Additional Voices	Voice Role
2006	The King of Queens	Kenny	Episode: "Mama Cast"
2006	My Neighbor Totoro	Kanta Okagi	Film; voice role (English dub, recorded 2005)
2007	Meet the Robinsons	Stanley Pukowski	Film; voice role
2007	Without a Trace	Alex Rosen	Episode: "One and Only"
2007	American Dad!	Johnny	Voice role; episode: "I Can't Stan You"
2008	The Mighty B!	Gwen's Brother #2	Voice role; episode: "Bee My Baby/Bee Afraid"
2008	Britney: For the Record	Himself	Film
2009	Criminal Minds	Jeffrey Barton	Episode: "Nameless, Faceless"
2013–2014	MyMusic	Jeff Pookie	Recurring role, 12 episodes
2014	A Lesson in Romance	Sean Mills	Television film
2015	Comedy Bang! Bang!	Tyler Cunningham	Episode: "Simon Helberg Wears a Sky Blue Button Down Jeans"
2016	Destiny 7	Brian	Recurring role, 5 episodes
