= Jamie Lynn Spears =

American actress and singer (born 1991)

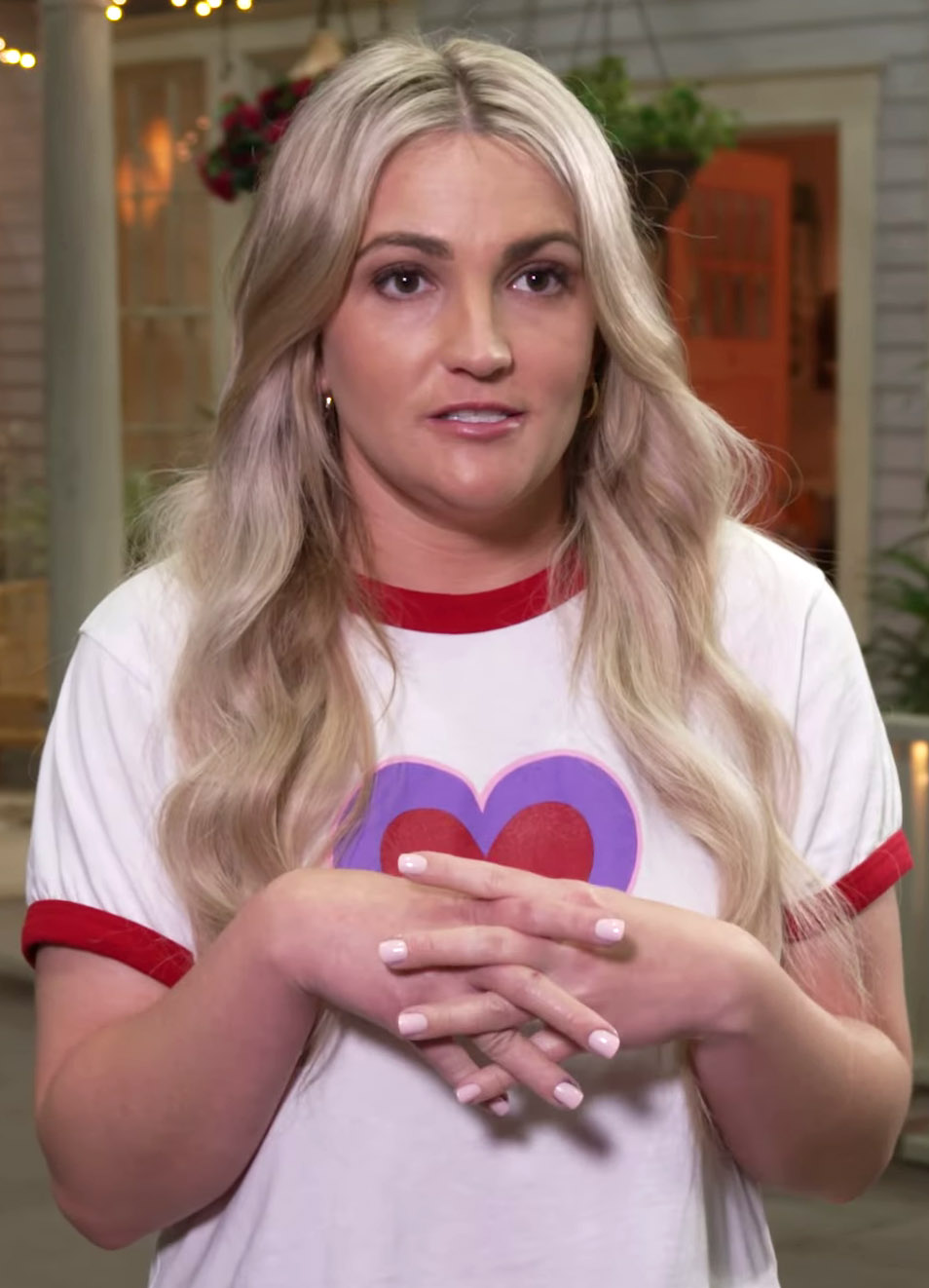
- Spears in 2023
- Born: April 4, 1991 (age 35); McComb, Mississippi, U.S.
- Occupations: Actress; singer
- Years active: 2002–present
- Television: All That; Zoey 101; Sweet Magnolias
- Spouse: Jamie Watson (m. 2014)
- Partner: Casey Aldridge (2005–2010)
- Children: 2
- Parents: Jamie Spears (father); Lynne Spears (mother)
- Relatives: Bryan Spears (brother); Britney Spears (sister)
- Musical career
- Genres: Country; pop; electropop
- Instrument: Vocals
- Labels: Nickelodeon; Columbia; Republic
- Website: jamielynnspears.com

Jamie Lynn Spears (born April 4, 1991) is an American actress, singer, and is the younger sister of Britney Spears. Spears began her career as a child actress on All That and had her breakthrough role when she played Zoey Brooks on the Nickelodeon teen sitcom Zoey 101 (2005–2008); she later reprised this role in the sequel film Zoey 102 (2023). She portrayed Noreen Fitzgibbons on the Netflix romantic drama series Sweet Magnolias (2020–2026) for five seasons. She is the recipient of several accolades, including a Gracie Award, two Kids Choice Awards and two Young Artist Awards.

Beginning in December 2007, Spears was subject to significant media attention and controversy after announcing her pregnancy at age 16. A misconception emerged that this canceled Zoey 101; however, the final season wrapped filming on August 10, 2007, and premiered the following year. After giving birth in June 2008, Spears stopped acting for five years.

Spears returned from her hiatus in 2013 and began her music career. She released her debut single "How Could I Want More" from her debut EP in country music, The Journey (2014). Spears also co-wrote Jana Kramer's platinum certified 2015 single, "I Got the Boy".

In 2023, due to the SAG-AFTRA strike, Spears appeared on reality television shows, such as Dancing with the Stars, Special Forces: World's Toughest Test and I'm a Celebrity...Get Me Out of Here!.

== Early life ==
Spears was born in McComb, Mississippi, and raised in Kentwood, Louisiana. She is the youngest child of Lynne Irene (née Bridges) and James "Jamie" Parnell Spears. She has two older siblings, Bryan and Britney. Her parents divorced in 2002, but were in an on-and-off relationship after the divorce. She has described her home life as unstable, but remembers "feeling very loved". She attended Parklane Academy in McComb, where she was a cheerleader, and point guard of the basketball team. She was enrolled in dance and voice lessons, and participated in school plays and church performances. As a child, Spears and her family also spent time traveling and touring with her sister Britney.

Spears studied with tutors while filming Zoey 101 in Los Angeles. She finished her education via online correspondence and received her GED in February 2008 through Tangipahoa Parish School System Adult Education Center.

== Career ==
=== 2002–2008: Career beginnings and success with All That and Zoey 101 ===
In February 2002, at age 10, Spears made her acting debut in the Paramount Pictures drama film Crossroads which starred her sister, who portrayed the central character Lucy Wagner. Spears made a cameo, playing the younger version of Britney's character. In April 2002, Spears walked the runway as a model for Kids R Us fashion show in New York City. Following Crossroads, Nickelodeon cast Spears as a regular performer in the sketch comedy series All That for the 2002 season; she appeared on the show through 2004. Spears portrayed various roles through the two seasons she appeared. Along with the cast of All That, Spears also made appearances on Snick On-Air Dare, Nickelodeon's version of Fear Factor. Deciding to pursue other roles on the network, Spears departed from the main cast on the tenth and final season of All That, and only appeared as a guest. At age 13, Spears was named as one of the celebrities on Teen People's Young Hollywood/Hot List.

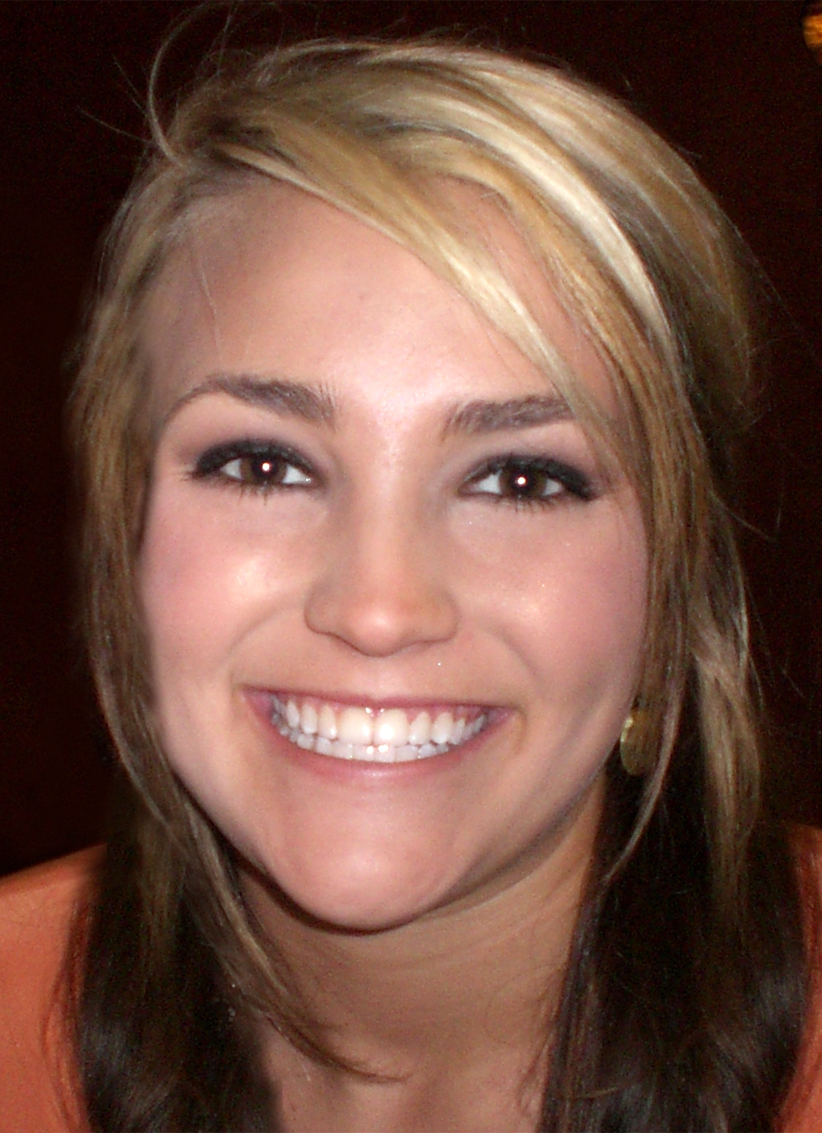
Spears in 2007

In August 2004, Spears signed a development deal with Nickelodeon in which she would star as the protagonist in her own scripted television series that would air on the network. The series went on to be titled Zoey 101 and Spears portrayed the role of Zoey Brooks. The series centered on Zoey and her friends who attend a fictional boarding school, Pacific Coast Academy (PCA). Spears recorded the series theme song, titled "Follow Me", which was written by her sister Britney Spears. Filmed at Pepperdine University in Malibu, California, the series premiered on January 9, 2005, and was the network's highest-rated series premiere in over eight years. Spears won a Young Artist Award and a Nickelodeon Kids' Choice Awards for her performance. In September 2007, she won "The High School Sweetheart" award at Us Weekly's Hot Hollywood event.

Zoey 101 was positively received by critics and viewers. It was nominated for an Emmy for Outstanding Children's Programming, and the show's season 3 finale episode was the second most-watched show across all cable channels that week. The series ran for four seasons, with its series finale "PCA Confidential" airing on May 2, 2008. Nickelodeon issued a statement shortly after the announcement of Spears being pregnant at the age of 16, stating that the network respected Spears's decision to take responsibility and noting that its primary concern was for her well-being. Spears' co-star Sean Flynn praised her as hard-working and talented, telling Nylon: "One of the things that always stood out to me regarding her professionalism was how well she knew her lines. I don’t think she ever messed one up. She always brought her best work to the table."

In December 2007, Variety announced that Spears had signed on to guest-appear in the ABC comedy sitcom series Miss Guided, in which she played the role of the promiscuous high-school student Mandy Fener in the episode "Hot Sub" which aired on March 20, 2008. That same year, Spears voiced Goldilocks in the direct-to-DVD animation film Unstable Fables: Goldilocks & 3 Bears Show.

=== 2011–2017: Country music debut ===
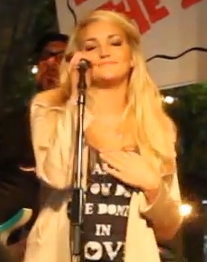
Spears performing in 2011

In 2011, Spears moved to Nashville and began working on a country music album with local music producers. On November 7, 2011, Spears held a small concert at The Rutledge in Nashville. On November 25, 2013, Spears released her first single "How Could I Want More". The song debuted at number 29 on Billboard's Hot Country Songs, and at number 8 on the Country Digital Songs chart, for the week ending December 7, 2013. Kevin Rutherford of Billboard described Spears' performance as "sweet and innocent" yet powerful, and suggested the song would fit right in at country radio. The song was named Taste of Country's Top Critic's Pick.

Spears was featured on her older sister Britney Spears's eighth studio album Britney Jean on the song "Chillin' with You". On May 27, 2014, Spears released her debut EP The Journey. The EP peaked at number 5 on Billboard's Heatseekers Albums and at number 24 on Top Country Albums. That year, Spears made numerous appearances on country radio talk shows, made performances at fairs and festivals, and was an opening act for Alan Jackson. Spears co-wrote the Jana Kramer song "I Got the Boy" which was released as the second single from Thirty One in 2015.

In 2016, Spears released the documentary Jamie Lynn Spears: When the Lights Go Out, reflecting on the controversy of her pregnancy, showcasing her country music career after "realizing [her] true calling was music" as well as her personal life as a wife and mother. On March 15, 2016, Spears performed at the Grand Ole Opry in Nashville. On June 24, 2016, Spears released her second single "Sleepover". Spears was a presenter and a performer at Radio Disney Music Awards in April 2017.

=== 2018–present: Sweet Magnolias, Zoey 102, memoir, and reality television ===
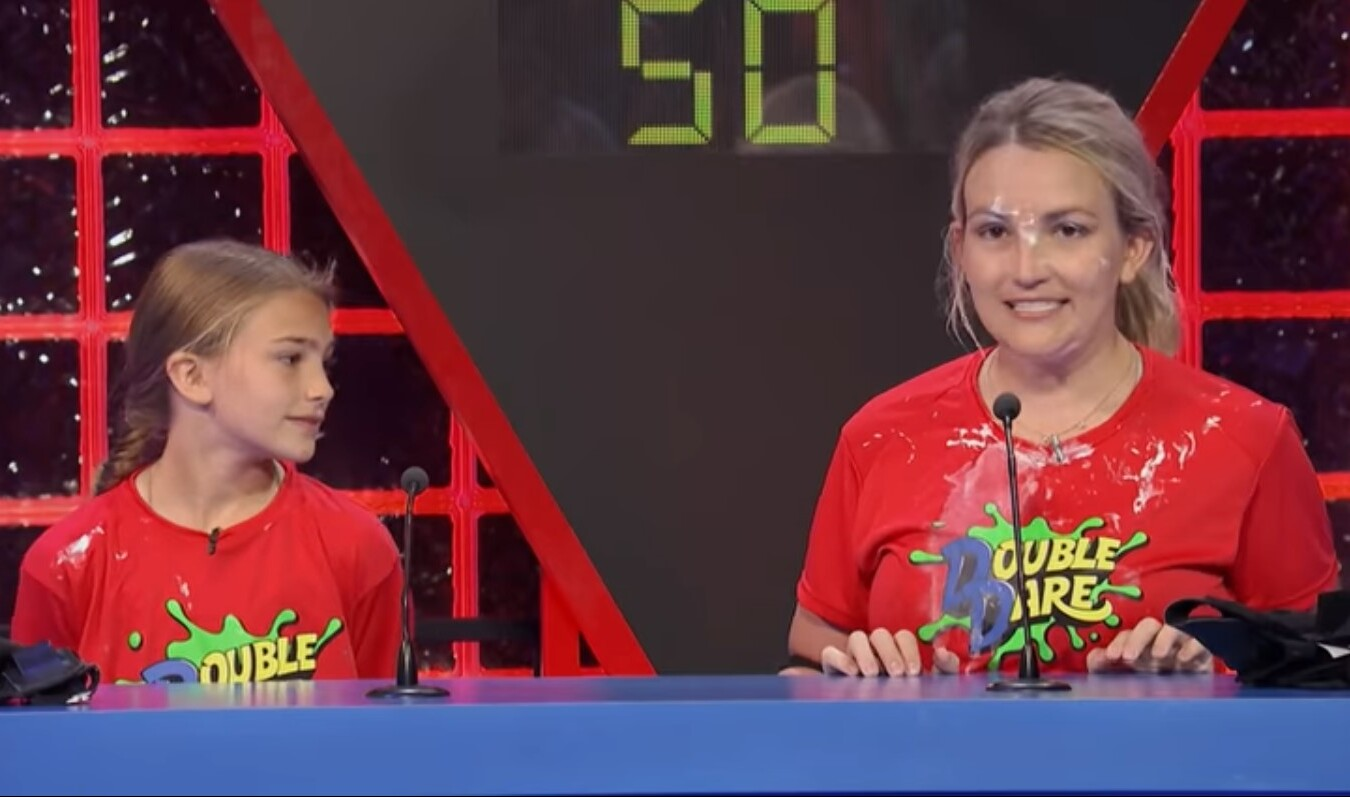
Spears and her daughter Maddie on the game show Double Dare in 2018

In an episode that aired on July 13, 2018, Spears returned to Nickelodeon for the first time in over ten years as a contestant on the revived game show Double Dare with her daughter Maddie. In July 2019, Netflix announced that Spears was cast as Noreen Fitzgibbons in the romance drama series Sweet Magnolias, based on the novel series by Sherryl Woods. Spears appeared in the role as a series regular in each subsequent season.

In July 2020, the cast of Zoey 101 reunited in an episode of the eleventh season of All That. Spears played herself and her old All That character Thelma Stump. That year, Spears and Chantel Jeffries recorded a new version of the Zoey 101 theme song "Follow Me". The music video for the song featured appearances by numerous celebrities and Spears' elder daughter Maddie. On October 29, 2020, Spears performed "Follow Me" on Good Morning America.

On January 18, 2022, Spears released her memoir Things I Should Have Said: Family, Fame, and Figuring it Out, under Worthy Publishing, an imprint of Hachette Book Group. Rolling Stone recommended the book but highlighted that Jamie Lynn ostensibly used her sister Britney Spears' highly publicized struggles and conservatorship to promote the book. The book debuted at number sixteen on Publishers Weekly Bestseller List selling 5,151 units in its first week.

On January 4, 2023, she began competing on Fox's survival television series Special Forces: World's Toughest Test, where contestants participate in special forces training challenges at a camp removed from society. She left the series during the competition's third episode, with Spears saying that she missed her children.

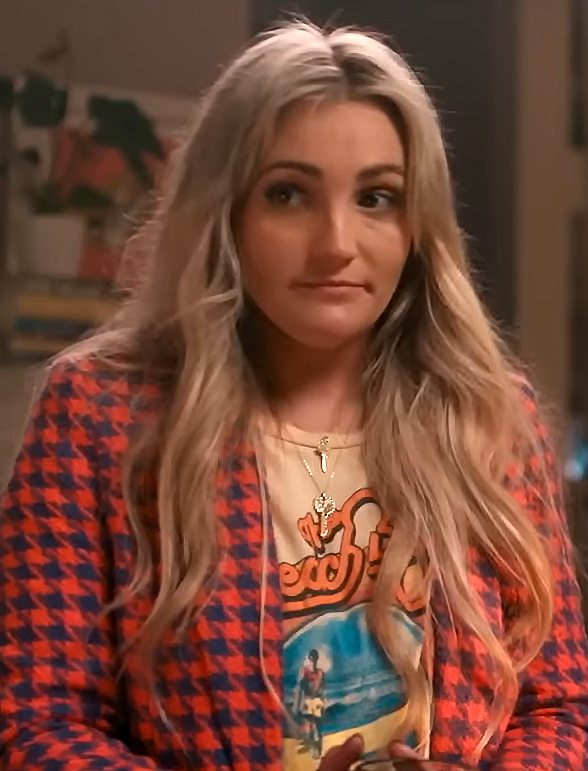
Spears as Zoey Brooks in the trailer for Zoey 102 (2023)

On July 27, 2023, the sequel film Zoey 102 was released on Paramount+, with Spears reprising her role from Zoey 101 alongside many of the original cast members. Production took place in January 2023 in North Carolina, with Spears attached as executive producer. Ready Steady Cut praised the film as "a nostalgic and amusing watch, enjoyable for original fans and the series newcomers." One day after its release, the film was the third most watched on Paramount+ in the U.S. and the second most watched in Canada.

In late 2023, Spears appeared in two unscripted projects, which she noted was due to the 2023 SAG-AFTRA strike. Spears competed on season 32 of Dancing with the Stars, paired with Alan Bersten; the season premiered on September 26, 2023. She donated her weekly earnings to SAG-AFTRA and the WGA. Spears was eliminated in the second week of the competition. On December 5, 2023, she returned for a group dance performance in the season finale along with other eliminated contestants. Spears appeared as a contestant on the twenty-third season of British survival reality television show I'm a Celebrity...Get Me Out of Here!, which premiered on November 19, 2023. Spears left the show after 11 days on November 29, 2023, for medical reasons, placing 11th in the series. She was the second contestant to depart on medical grounds that season, as Grace Dent left days earlier.

The fifth season of Sweet Magnolias premiered on June 11, 2026 on Netflix. The series was continuously ranked among Netflix’s Global Top 10 list in over 60 countries. Despite its success, the series was cancelled in September 2026.

== Public image ==
In the early years of her career, Spears had a generally wholesome image as a teen star. Her fame increased dramatically in the wake of her pregnancy announcement in December 2007, and during the following months, she became a frequent target of the paparazzi. In subsequent years, Spears was rarely seen in the public eye and focused on family, saying: "I used to be insecure at times, because I was always the youngest mom in the room. I quickly learned that being a good and competent mother has nothing to do with age."

Spears has been featured in several fashion blogs and magazines such as Nylon, Seventeen, Teen Vogue, CosmoGirl, Teen People, Teen, Girls' Life, Mizz and Nickelodeon Magazine. Spears has appeared in commercials and print ads throughout her career. She appeared in television commercials for the E-kara karaoke headset, Pepsi and Clorox bleach. In 2018, she appeared in an advertising campaign and social media ads for Kraft Foods with daughter Maddie.

Spears endorses beauty and wellness products on Instagram. She has partnered with FabFitFun subscription box, Smart Food popcorn and International Loops marketing agency.

== Personal life ==
Spears attended First Baptist Church in Kentwood, Louisiana, but she is Catholic since her conversion in early 2018, as are her daughters and her mother Lynne.

In 2013, Spears was diagnosed with anxiety, depression, and obsessive–compulsive disorder. She underwent therapy and briefly used medication as well. "The anxiety was to the point where I couldn't function," she commented. "I'm very conscious not to lie to myself anymore because I think that my biggest issue my whole life was pretending to be perfect."

=== Teenage pregnancy ===
On December 18, 2007, in an interview with OK! magazine, Spears announced that she was pregnant by her then boyfriend, Casey Aldridge. She was 16 years old at the time. Aldridge, whom she had been dating for two years, was 18. Spears confirmed her engagement to Aldridge in March 2008. In May 2008, the couple moved to Liberty, Mississippi, and purchased a house, with Spears stating they would raise their child there. She gave birth to their daughter Maddie Briann Aldridge on June 19, 2008, in McComb, Mississippi. Spears and Aldridge ended their engagement in March 2009, and Spears moved out in December 2009. The couple reconciled in August 2010, but ended their relationship a second time in November 2010.

The announcement of Spears' pregnancy generated controversy, with criticism centering on the story purportedly glamorizing teenage pregnancy. Some teens were disappointed with the contrast between Spears' on-screen personality as a "good girl" and her real-life teen pregnancy.

On June 4, 2008, while in Amite County, Mississippi, the Spears family filed a complaint against Edwin Merrino, a paparazzo who, they believed, was stalking the couple. Merrino denied the allegation. He was released later in the day after posting bond.

After her daughter's birth, Spears disappeared from the public eye for five years, focusing on raising her child. In an interview with Nylon, Spears said: "So, I got me a little house. I put a big gate up around it, and I was like, 'I'm going to stay here, raise my baby, and figure this out because this is real life. I've put myself in this situation, I'm not condoning it or saying it's right, but these are the cards that I have to play.' And I tried to do the best that I could."

=== Marriage and family ===
She subsequently began a relationship with Jamie Watson, a businessman who owns the communications service Advanced Media Partners. After two years of on-and-off dating, they announced their engagement in March 2013. On March 14, 2014, she married Watson in New Orleans. On April 11, 2018, Spears gave birth to her second daughter.

=== ATV incident ===
On February 5, 2017, Spears' eight-year-old daughter Maddie almost drowned in a Polaris ATV accident, after accidentally driving into the pond on her stepfather and mother's Louisiana property, with the ATV flipping over upon impact. She was later airlifted to Children's Hospital of New Orleans, where she remained unconscious in a coma for two days. She woke up and was released from care on February 10. Police reported the incident as occurring before 3:00 p.m. on a Sunday afternoon, and the sheriff explained that she was steering "100 yards from her parents" when she took "a hard right to avoid running over a nearby drainage ditch". The police report stated, "The child was trapped and secured by the seatbelt and the ATV's safety netting. Within two minutes, Acadian Ambulance Services arrived and assisted in freeing the child from the cold waters."

In 2020, Spears explained the situation further. She elaborated that she and her husband Jamie Watson "[...] dove in and [...] were able to rescue her," then the first responder took her away. The firefighter was able to get a pulse, but her case looked "grim at the time", leading to her being airlifted to the hospital.

== Filmography ==
=== Film ===
Year	Title	Role	Notes
2002	Crossroads	Young Lucy Wagner	
2008	The Goldilocks and the 3 Bears Show	Goldilocks	Voice role
2023	Zoey 102	Zoey Brooks	Paramount+ film; also executive producer

=== Television ===
Year	Title	Role	Notes
2002–2005; 2020	All That	Thelma Stump / Various	Main role: seasons 8–9; guest: seasons 10– 11
2002–2005	Snick On-Air Dare	Herself	Participant
2003	Switched!	Herself	Episode: "Kyle and Danielle"
2005	A Weekend with...	Herself	Episode: "Jamie Lynn Spears"
2005–2008	Zoey 101	Zoey Brooks	Lead role; 61 episodes
2006	Zoey 101: Spring Break-Up	Zoey Brooks	Television special
2008	Zoey 101: Behind the Scenes	Zoey Brooks	Nickelodeon special
2008	Miss Guided	Mandy Ferner	Episode: "Hot Sub"
2015	What Did Zoey Say?	Zoey Brooks	Short film; archive footage
2016	When the Lights Go Out	Herself	Documentary by TLC
2016	The Talk	Herself	Guest co-host; Episode: "Jamie Lynn Spears/Sela Ward/Frank Grillo"
2018	Double Dare	Herself	Contestant; Episode: "Team Server vs. Team Spears"
2020–2026	Sweet Magnolias	Noreen Fitzgibbons	Series regular; 50 episodes
2023	Special Forces: World's Toughest Test	Herself	Contestant on season 1; 3 episodes
2023	Dancing with the Stars	Herself	Contestant on season 32; 3 episodes
2023	I'm a Celebrity...Get Me Out of Here!	Herself	Contestant on season 23; 11 episodes

== Discography ==
=== Extended plays ===
Extended plays, with selected chart positions and certifications
Title	EP details	Peak chart positions			
Title	EP details	US	US Country	US Heat	US Indie
The Journey	Released: May 27, 2014; Format: Digital download; Label: Sweet Jamie Music	193	24	5	25

=== Singles ===
Title	Year	Peak chart positions					Album
Title	Year	US Bub.	US Country	US Country Airplay	CAN	UK Indie	Album
"How Could I Want More"	2013	18	29	55	68	27	The Journey
"Sleepover"	2016	—	—	—	—	—	Non-album singles
"Follow Me" (with Chantel Jeffries)	2020	—	—	—	—	—	Non-album singles
"—" denotes releases that did not chart or were not released in that territory

=== Other appearances ===
Title	Year	Other artist(s)	Album
"(Hey Now) Girls Just Want to Have Fun"	2002	Triple Image	Celebrate
"Chillin' with You"	2013	Britney Spears	Britney Jean

=== Music videos ===
Title	Year	Director	Ref.
"How Could I Want More"	2013	Matthew Underwood	
"Sleepover (Acoustic Nashville Session)"	2016	Bryan Spears	
"Follow Me"	2020	Philip Andelman	

== Awards and nominations ==
Year	Association	Category	Work	Result	Ref.
2004	Kids' Choice Awards	Favorite Female TV Star	All That	Nominated	
2005	Young Artist Awards	Outstanding Young Performers in A TV Series (shared with cast)	All That	Nominated	
2005	Teen Choice Awards	Choice TV Breakout Performance – Female	Zoey 101	Nominated	
2005	Young Hollywood Awards	One to Watch – Female	Herself	Won	
2006	Kids' Choice Awards	Favorite TV Actress	Zoey 101	Won	
2006	Young Artist Awards	Best Young Ensemble Performance in A TV Series (Comedy or Drama) (shared with cast)	Zoey 101	Won	
2006	Gracie Awards	Outstanding Female Rising Star in a Comedy Series	Zoey 101	Won	
2007	Kids' Choice Awards	Favorite TV Actress	Zoey 101	Nominated	
2007	Kids' Choice Awards Germany	Favorite Actress	Zoey 101	Won	
2007	Nickelodeon UK Kids' Choice Awards	Best TV Actress	Zoey 101	Nominated	
2007	Young Artist Awards	Best Performance in A TV Series (Comedy or Drama) – Leading Young Actress	Zoey 101	Nominated	
2007	Young Artist Awards	Best Young Ensemble Performance in A TV Series (Comedy or Drama) (shared with cast)	Zoey 101	Won	
2008	Kids' Choice Awards	Favorite TV Actress	Zoey 101	Nominated	
2008	Young Artist Awards	Best Performance in A TV Series – Leading Young Actress	Zoey 101	Nominated	
2008	Young Artist Awards	Best Young Ensemble Performance in A TV Series (shared with cast)	Zoey 101	Nominated	

== Published works ==
- Spears, Jamie Lynn: Things I Should Have Said: Family, Fame, and Figuring it Out, Worthy Publishing, January 18, 2022.
