= List of American films of 2023 =

This is a list of American films released in 2023.

The year featured a diverse array of cinematic productions, ranging from major studio blockbusters to independent and streaming platform releases. Notable films included Oppenheimer, a biographical drama directed by Christopher Nolan exploring the life of physicist J. Robert Oppenheimer; Barbie, a fantasy comedy starring Margot Robbie and Ryan Gosling; The Super Mario Bros. Movie, the first billion dollar movie to be based on a video game; Guardians of the Galaxy Vol. 3, directed by James Gunn as part of the Marvel Cinematic Universe; and John Wick: Chapter 4, featuring Keanu Reeves reprising his role as the titular assassin.

Following the box office section, this list is organized chronologically, providing information on release dates, production companies, directors, and principal cast members.

== Box office ==
The highest-grossing American films released in 2023, by domestic box office gross revenue, are as follows:

Highest-grossing films of 2023
Rank	Title	Distributor	Domestic gross
1	Barbie	Warner Bros.	$637,332,531
2	The Super Mario Bros. Movie	Universal	$574,934,330
3	Spider-Man: Across the Spider-Verse	Sony	$381,593,754
4	Guardians of the Galaxy Vol. 3	Disney	$358,995,815
5	Oppenheimer	Universal	$330,162,540
6	The Little Mermaid	Disney	$298,172,056
7	Wonka	Warner Bros.	$218,377,073
8	Ant-Man and the Wasp: Quantumania	Disney	$214,506,909
9	John Wick: Chapter 4	Lionsgate	$187,131,806
10	Sound of Freedom	Angel Studios	$184,174,617

== January–March ==
Opening		Title	Production company	Cast and crew	Ref.
J A N U A R Y	6	M3GAN	Universal Pictures / Blumhouse Productions / Atomic Monster	Gerard Johnstone (director); Akela Cooper (screenplay); Allison Williams, Violet McGraw, Amie Donald, Jenna Davis, Ronny Chieng, Brian Jordan Alvarez	
J A N U A R Y	6	The Old Way	Saban Films / Saturn Films	Brett Donowho (director); Carl W. Lucas (screenplay); Nicolas Cage, Ryan Kiera Armstrong	
J A N U A R Y	10	Mystery Highway	TimeAxis Entertainment / Intellexual Entertainment	Clarke M. Smith (director/screenplay); David S. Dawson (screenplay); Rachel Elizabeth Ames, Christopher Cendana, Randy Davison, Larry Poole, James Steinberg, Whitney Wegman-Wood, Walter M. Nowosad Jr., Shane P. Allen	
J A N U A R Y	11	The Devil Conspiracy	Samuel Goldwyn Films	Nathan Frankowski (director); Ed Alan (screenplay); Alice Orr-Ewing, Joe Doyle, Eveline Hall, Peter Mensah, Joe Anderson, Spencer Wilding, Brian Caspe, James Faulkner	
J A N U A R Y	13	Plane	Lionsgate / MadRiver Pictures / Di Bonaventura Pictures	Jean-François Richet (director); Charles Cumming, J. P. Davis (screenplay); Gerard Butler, Mike Colter, Yoson An, Tony Goldwyn	
J A N U A R Y	13	House Party	Warner Bros. Pictures / New Line Cinema	Calmatic (director); Jamal Olori, Stephen Glover (screenplay); Tosin Cole, Jacob Latimore, Karen Obilom, D.C. Young Fly, Scott Mescudi	
J A N U A R Y	13	Sick	Peacock / Miramax / Blumhouse Productions	John Hyams (director); Kevin Williamson, Katelyn Crabb (screenplay); Gideon Adlon, Bethlehem Million, Marc Menchaca, Jane Adams	
J A N U A R Y	13	The Drop	Hulu / Duplass Brothers Productions	Sarah Adina Smith (director/screenplay); Joshua Leonard (screenplay); Anna Konkle, Jermaine Fowler, Jillian Bell, Utkarsh Ambudkar	
J A N U A R Y	13	Dog Gone	Netflix	Stephen Herek (director); Nick Santora (screenplay); Rob Lowe, Johnny Berchtold, Kimberly Williams-Paisley	
J A N U A R Y	13	Jethica	Cinedigm / Screambox / Fandor	Pete Ohs (director/screenplay); Ashley Denise Robinson, Will Madden, Callie Hernandez, Andy Faulkner (screenplay); Callie Hernandez, Ashley Denise Robinson, Andy Faulkner, Will Madden	
J A N U A R Y	17	There's Something Wrong with the Children	Paramount Pictures / Blumhouse Productions	Roxanne Benjamin (director); T. J. Cimfel, David White (screenplay); Alisha Wainwright, Zach Gilford, Amanda Crew, Carlos Santos	
J A N U A R Y	20	Missing	Screen Gems / Stage 6 Films / Bazelevs Company	Nick Johnson, Will Merrick (directors/screenplay); Storm Reid, Joaquim de Almeida, Ken Leung, Amy Landecker, Daniel Henney, Nia Long	
J A N U A R Y	20	The Son	Sony Pictures Classics / Film4 Productions / Ingenious Media / See-Saw Films	Florian Zeller (director/screenplay); Christopher Hampton (screenplay); Hugh Jackman, Laura Dern, Vanessa Kirby, Zen McGrath, Hugh Quarshie, Anthony Hopkins	
J A N U A R Y	20	When You Finish Saving the World	A24	Jesse Eisenberg (director/screenplay); Julianne Moore, Finn Wolfhard, Alisha Boe, Jay O. Sanders, Billy Bryk, Eleonore Hendricks	
J A N U A R Y	20	Detective Knight: Independence	Lionsgate	Edward John Drake (director/screenplay); Corey Large (screenplay); Bruce Willis	
J A N U A R Y	20	Kids vs. Aliens	RLJE Films / Shudder	Jason Eisener (director/screenplay); John Davies (screenplay); Dominic Mariche, Phoebe Rex, Calem MacDonald, Asher Grayson	
J A N U A R Y	26	Teen Wolf: The Movie	Paramount+ / MTV Entertainment Studios	Russell Mulcahy (director); Jeff Davis (screenplay); Tyler Posey, Crystal Reed, Tyler Hoechlin, Holland Roden, Colton Haynes, Shelley Hennig, Dylan Sprayberry, Linden Ashby, Melissa Ponzio, JR Bourne	
J A N U A R Y	27	You People	Netflix	Kenya Barris (director/screenplay); Jonah Hill (screenplay); Jonah Hill, Lauren London, David Duchovny, Nia Long, Julia Louis-Dreyfus, Eddie Murphy	
J A N U A R Y	27	Shotgun Wedding	Amazon Studios / Lionsgate / Mandeville Films	Jason Moore (director); Mark Hammer (screenplay); Jennifer Lopez, Josh Duhamel, Sônia Braga, Jennifer Coolidge, Lenny Kravitz, Cheech Marin	
J A N U A R Y	27	Maybe I Do	Vertical Entertainment / Fifth Season	Michael Jacobs (director/screenplay); Diane Keaton, Richard Gere, Susan Sarandon, Emma Roberts, Luke Bracey, William H. Macy	
J A N U A R Y	27	Life Upside Down	IFC Films	Cecilia Miniucchi (director/screenplay); Danny Huston, Radha Mitchell, Bob Odenkirk	
J A N U A R Y	27	Fear	Hidden Empire Releasing	Deon Taylor (director/screenplay); John Ferry (screenplay); Joseph Sikora, King Bach, Annie Ilonzeh, Iddo Goldberg, Ruby Modine	
F E B R U A R Y	3	Knock at the Cabin	Universal Pictures / Blinding Edge Pictures / FilmNation Entertainment	M. Night Shyamalan (director/screenplay); Steve Desmond, Michael Sherman (screenplay); Dave Bautista, Jonathan Groff, Ben Aldridge, Nikki Amuka-Bird, Kristen Cui, Abby Quinn, Rupert Grint	
F E B R U A R Y	3	80 for Brady	Paramount Pictures / Fifth Season	Kyle Marvin (director/screenplay); Emily Halpern, Sarah Haskins, Michael Covino (screenplay); Lily Tomlin, Jane Fonda, Rita Moreno, Sally Field, Tom Brady	
F E B R U A R Y	3	The Locksmith	Screen Media Films	Nicolas Harvard (director); John Glosser, Joe Russo, Chris LaMont, Ben Kabialis (screenplay); Ryan Phillippe, Kate Bosworth, Ving Rhames	
F E B R U A R Y	3	Baby Ruby	Magnet Releasing / FilmNation Entertainment	Bess Wohl (director/screenplay); Noémie Merlant, Kit Harington, Meredith Hagner	
F E B R U A R Y	3	Freedom's Path	Xenon Pictures	Brett Smith (director/screenplay); Gerran Howell, RJ Cyler, Ewen Bremner, Harrison Gilbertson	
F E B R U A R Y	7	The Wedding Hustler	Matthew 25:14 / 1091 Pictures	Chris Soriano (director/screenplay); Chris Soriano, Christine S. Chang, Hillary Soriano, Heart Evangelista, Kane Lim	
F E B R U A R Y	10	Magic Mike's Last Dance	Warner Bros. Pictures	Steven Soderbergh (director); Reid Carolin (screenplay); Channing Tatum, Salma Hayek Pinault	
F E B R U A R Y	10	Sharper	Apple TV+ / A24 / IAC Films	Benjamin Caron (director); Brian Gatewood, Alessandro Takara (screenplay); Julianne Moore, Sebastian Stan, Justice Smith, Briana Middleton, John Lithgow	
F E B R U A R Y	10	Your Place or Mine	Netflix / Aggregate Films / Hello Sunshine	Aline Brosh McKenna (director/screenplay); Reese Witherspoon, Ashton Kutcher, Jesse Williams, Tig Notaro, Zoë Chao, Steve Zahn	
F E B R U A R Y	10	Somebody I Used to Know	Amazon Studios / Black Bear Pictures / Temple Hill Entertainment	Dave Franco (director/screenplay); Alison Brie (screenplay); Alison Brie, Jay Ellis, Kiersey Clemons, Julie Hagerty, Haley Joel Osment, Amy Sedaris	
F E B R U A R Y	10	Consecration	IFC Films / AGC Studios	Christopher Smith (director/screenplay); Laurie Cook (screenplay); Jena Malone, Danny Huston, Janet Suzman	
F E B R U A R Y	10	The Outwaters	Cinedigm / Bloody Disgusting	Robbie Banfitch (director/screenplay); Robbie Banfitch, Angela Basolis, Scott Schamell, Michelle May	
F E B R U A R Y	17	Ant-Man and the Wasp: Quantumania	Marvel Studios	Peyton Reed (director); Jeff Loveness (screenplay); Paul Rudd, Evangeline Lilly, Jonathan Majors, Kathryn Newton, David Dastmalchian, Katy O'Brian, William Jackson Harper, Bill Murray, Michelle Pfeiffer, Corey Stoll, Michael Douglas	
F E B R U A R Y	24	Cocaine Bear	Universal Pictures / Lord Miller Productions / Brownstone Productions	Elizabeth Banks (director); Jimmy Warren (screenplay); Keri Russell, O'Shea Jackson Jr., Christian Convery, Alden Ehrenreich, Brooklynn Prince, Isiah Whitlock Jr., Margo Martindale, Ray Liotta	
F E B R U A R Y	24	Jesus Revolution	Lionsgate / Kingdom Story Company	Jon Erwin, Brent McCorkle (director/screenplay); Joel Courtney, Anna Grace Barlow, Jonathan Roumie, Kimberly Williams-Paisley, Kelsey Grammer	
F E B R U A R Y	24	Luther: The Fallen Sun	Netflix / BBC Film / Chernin Entertainment	Jamie Payne (director); Neil Cross (screenplay); Idris Elba, Cynthia Erivo, Andy Serkis, Dermot Crowley	
F E B R U A R Y	24	We Have a Ghost	Netflix / Legendary Entertainment / Temple Hill Entertainment	Christopher Landon (director/screenplay); David Harbour, Anthony Mackie, Jahi Di'Allo Winston, Tig Notaro, Erica Ash, Jennifer Coolidge	
F E B R U A R Y	24	Bruiser	Hulu / Onyx Collective	Miles Warren (director/screenplay); Ben Medina (screenplay); Trevante Rhodes, Jalyn Hall, Shinelle Azoroh, Shamier Anderson	
F E B R U A R Y	24	Linoleum	Shout! Studios	Colin West (director/screenplay); Jim Gaffigan, Rhea Seehorn, Katelyn Nacon, Gabriel Rush, Michael Ian Black, Tony Shalhoub	
F E B R U A R Y	24	God's Time	IFC Films	Daniel Antebi (director/screenplay); Ben Groh, Dion Costelloe, Liz Caribel Sierra	
M A R C H	3	Creed III	Metro-Goldwyn-Mayer	Michael B. Jordan (director); Keenan Coogler, Zach Baylin (screenplay); Michael B. Jordan, Tessa Thompson, Jonathan Majors, Wood Harris, Mila Davis-Kent, Florian Munteanu, Phylicia Rashad	
M A R C H	3	Operation Fortune: Ruse de Guerre	Lionsgate / STXfilms / Miramax	Guy Ritchie (director/screenplay); Ivan Atkinson, Marn Davies (screenplay); Jason Statham, Aubrey Plaza, Josh Hartnett, Cary Elwes, Bugzy Malone, Hugh Grant	
M A R C H	3	A Little White Lie	Saban Films	Michael Maren (director/screenplay); Michael Shannon, Kate Hudson, Don Johnson, Zach Braff	
M A R C H	3	Children of the Corn	RLJE Films / Shudder	Kurt Wimmer (director/screenplay); Elena Kampouris, Kate Moyer, Callan Mulvey, Bruce Spence	
M A R C H	3	Palm Trees and Power Lines	Momentum Pictures	Jamie Dack (director/screenplay); Audrey Findlay (screenplay); Lily McInerny, Jonathan Tucker, Gretchen Mol	
M A R C H	3	The Year Between	Gravitas Ventures	Alex Heller (director/screenplay); Alex Heller, J. Smith-Cameron, Steve Buscemi, Wyatt Oleff, Emily Robinson	
M A R C H	7	Unseen	Paramount Pictures / Blumhouse Productions	Yoko Okumura (director); Salvatore Cardoni, Brian Rawlins (screenplay); Midori Francis, Jolene Purdy, Missi Pyle	
M A R C H	8	Craving	Indie Rights	J. Horton (director/screenplay); Gregory Blair (screenplay); Rachel Amanda Bryant, Al Gomez, Gregory Blair, Ashley Undercuffler, Kevin Caliber, Holly Rockwell, Xavier Roe, Sage Mayer, Felissa Rose	
M A R C H	10	Scream VI	Paramount Pictures / Spyglass Media Group / Radio Silence Productions	Matt Bettinelli-Olpin, Tyler Gillett (directors); James Vanderbilt, Guy Busick (screenplay); Melissa Barrera, Jasmin Savoy Brown, Jack Champion, Henry Czerny, Mason Gooding, Dermot Mulroney, Jenna Ortega, Tony Revolori, Josh Segarra, Samara Weaving, Hayden Panettiere, Courteney Cox	
M A R C H	10	65	Columbia Pictures / Bron Creative	Scott Beck, Bryan Woods (director/screenplay); Adam Driver, Ariana Greenblatt, Chloe Coleman, Nika King	
M A R C H	10	Champions	Focus Features / Gold Circle Entertainment	Bobby Farrelly (director); Marc Rizzo (screenplay); Woody Harrelson, Kaitlin Olson, Ernie Hudson, Cheech Marin	
M A R C H	10	Chang Can Dunk	Disney+ / Walt Disney Pictures	Jingyi Shao (director/screenplay); Bloom Li, Ben Wang, Dexter Darden	
M A R C H	10	Southern Gospel	Sunbreak Studios / Bridgestone Multimedia	Jeffrey A. Smith (director/screenplay); Max Ehrich, Katelyn Nacon, J. Alphonse Nicholson, Emma Myers	
M A R C H	17	Shazam! Fury of the Gods	Warner Bros. Pictures / New Line Cinema / DC Studios	David F. Sandberg (director); Henry Gayden, Chris Morgan (screenplay); Zachary Levi, Asher Angel, Jack Dylan Grazer, Rachel Zegler, Adam Brody, Ross Butler, D. J. Cotrona, Grace Caroline Currey, Meagan Good, Lucy Liu, Djimon Hounsou, Helen Mirren	
M A R C H	17	Boston Strangler	Hulu / 20th Century Studios / Scott Free Productions / LuckyChap Entertainment	Matt Ruskin (director/screenplay); Keira Knightley, Carrie Coon, Alessandro Nivola, David Dastmalchian, Morgan Spector, Chris Cooper	
M A R C H	17	The Magician's Elephant	Netflix / Netflix Animation / Animal Logic	Wendy Rogers (director); Martin Hynes (screenplay); Noah Jupe, Benedict Wong, Sian Clifford, Pixie Davies, Natasia Demetriou, Dawn French, Brian Tyree Henry, Aasif Mandvi, Mandy Patinkin, Miranda Richardson, Cree Summer, Lorraine Toussaint	
M A R C H	17	Moving On	Roadside Attractions	Paul Weitz (director/screenplay); Jane Fonda, Lily Tomlin, Malcolm McDowell, Sarah Burns, Richard Roundtree	
M A R C H	17	Wildflower	Momentum Pictures / Entertainment One	Matt Smukler (director); Jana Savage (screenplay); Kiernan Shipka, Dash Mihok, Charlie Plummer, Alexandra Daddario, Reid Scott, Erika Alexander, Samantha Hyde, Jacki Weaver	
M A R C H	17	Supercell	Saban Films	Herbert James Winterstern (director/screenplay); Anna Elizabeth James (screenplay); Skeet Ulrich, Anne Heche, Daniel Diemer, Jordan Kristine Seamón, Alec Baldwin	
M A R C H	17	Pinball: The Man Who Saved the Game	Vertical Entertainment	The Bragg Brothers (directors/screenplay); Mike Faist, Crystal Reed, Dennis Boutsikaris	
M A R C H	24	John Wick: Chapter 4	Lionsgate / Summit Entertainment / Thunder Road Films / 87North Productions	Chad Stahelski (director); Shay Hatten, Michael Finch (screenplay); Keanu Reeves, Donnie Yen, Bill Skarsgård, Laurence Fishburne, Hiroyuki Sanada, Shamier Anderson, Lance Reddick, Rina Sawayama, Scott Adkins, Clancy Brown, Ian McShane	
M A R C H	24	A Good Person	Metro-Goldwyn-Mayer / Killer Films / Elevation Pictures	Zach Braff (director/screenplay); Florence Pugh, Molly Shannon, Chinaza Uche, Celeste O'Connor, Morgan Freeman	
M A R C H	24	The Tutor	Vertical Entertainment	Jordan Ross (director); Ryan King (screenplay); Garrett Hedlund, Noah Schnapp, Victoria Justice	
M A R C H	24	Last Sentinel	Vertical Entertainment	Tanel Toom (director); Malachi Smith (screenplay); Kate Bosworth, Thomas Kretschmann, Lucien Laviscount, Martin McCann	
M A R C H	28	Adalynn	Summer Hill Films	Jacob Byrd (director); Jerrod D. Brito (screenplay); Sydney Carvill, Wade Baker Janet Carter, Rob Shuster, Suzana Norberg	
M A R C H	31	Dungeons & Dragons: Honor Among Thieves	Paramount Pictures / Entertainment One / Hasbro Studios	John Francis Daley, Jonathan Goldstein (directors/screenplay); Michael Gilio (screenplay); Chris Pine, Michelle Rodriguez, Regé-Jean Page, Justice Smith, Sophia Lillis, Hugh Grant	
M A R C H	31	Murder Mystery 2	Netflix / Happy Madison Productions / Echo Films	Jeremy Garelick (director); James Vanderbilt (screenplay); Adam Sandler, Jennifer Aniston, Mélanie Laurent, Jodie Turner-Smith, Annie Mumolo, Tony Goldwyn, Mark Strong	
M A R C H	31	Tetris	Apple TV+ / Marv Studios / AI Film	Jon S. Baird (director); Noah Pink (screenplay); Taron Egerton, Nikita Efremov, Sofia Lebedeva, Anthony Boyle, Toby Jones, Roger Allam	
M A R C H	31	Spinning Gold	Variance Films	Timothy Scott Bogart (director/screenplay); Jeremy Jordan, Wiz Khalifa, Jason Isaacs, Jason Derulo, Jay Pharoah, Michelle Monaghan, Dan Fogler, Sebastian Maniscalco	
M A R C H	31	Space Oddity	Samuel Goldwyn Films	Kyra Sedgwick (director); Rebecca Banner (screenplay); Kyle Allen, Alexandra Shipp, Madeline Brewer, Kevin Bacon, Simon Helberg, Carrie Preston, Arden Myrin	
M A R C H	31	A Thousand and One	Focus Features	A.V. Rockwell (director/screenplay); Teyana Taylor, Will Catlett, Josiah Cross, Aven Courtney, Aaron Kingsley Adetola	
M A R C H	31	Assassin	Saban Films	Jesse Atlas (director/screenplay); Aaron Wolfe (screenplay); Nomzamo Mbatha, Dominic Purcell, Bruce Willis	
M A R C H	31	Acidman	Brainstorm Media	Alex Lehmann (director/screenplay); Chris Dowling (screenplay); Thomas Haden Church, Dianna Agron	
M A R C H	31	Malum	Welcome Villain Films	Anthony DiBlasi (director/screenplay); Scott Poiley (screenplay); Jessica Sula, Candice Coke, Chaney Morrow, Clarke Wolfe, Morgan Lennon	

== April–June ==
Opening		Title	Production company	Cast and crew	Ref.
A P R I L	4	Miracle at Manchester	Bridgestone Media / JC Films	Eddie McClintock (director); Jason Campbell (screenplay); Eddie McClintock, Dean Cain, Daniel Roebuck	
A P R I L	5	The Super Mario Bros. Movie	Universal Pictures / Illumination / Nintendo	Aaron Horvath, Michael Jelenic (directors); Matthew Fogel (screenplay); Chris Pratt, Anya Taylor-Joy, Charlie Day, Jack Black, Keegan-Michael Key, Seth Rogen, Fred Armisen, Sebastian Maniscalco, Charles Martinet, Kevin Michael Richardson	
A P R I L	5	Air	Amazon Studios / Skydance Media / Mandalay Pictures	Ben Affleck (director); Alex Convery (screenplay); Matt Damon, Ben Affleck, Jason Bateman, Marlon Wayans, Chris Messina, Chris Tucker, Viola Davis	
A P R I L	7	Praise This	Peacock / Universal Pictures / Will Packer Productions	Tina Gordon Chism (director/screenplay); Camilla Blackett, Brandon Broussard, Hudson Obayuwana, Jana Savege (screenplay); Chloe Bailey, Anjelika Washington, Philip Fornah, Quavo, Tristan Wilds, Jekalyn Carr, Koryn Hawthorne, Druski	
A P R I L	7	Showing Up	A24	Kelly Reichardt (director/screenplay); Jonathan Raymond (screenplay); Michelle Williams, Hong Chau, Maryann Plunkett, John Magaro, André Benjamin, James LeGros, Judd Hirsch	
A P R I L	7	Paint	IFC Films	Brit McAdams (director/screenplay); Owen Wilson, Michaela Watkins, Wendi McLendon-Covey, Ciara Renée, Lucy Freyer, Lusia Strus, Stephen Root	
A P R I L	7	On a Wing and a Prayer	Amazon Studios / Metro-Goldwyn-Mayer / LightWorkers Media	Sean McNamara (director); Brian Egeston (screenplay); Dennis Quaid, Heather Graham, Jesse Metcalfe	
A P R I L	7	Chupa	Netflix	Jonás Cuarón (director); Marcus Rinehart, Sean Kennedy Moore, Joe Barnathan (screenplay); Demián Bichir, Christian Slater, Evan Whitten	
A P R I L	7	How to Blow Up a Pipeline	Neon / Lyrical Media	Daniel Goldhaber (director/screenplay); Ariela Barer, Jordan Sjol (screenplay); Ariela Barer, Kristine Froseth, Lukas Gage, Forrest Goodluck, Sasha Lane, Jayme Lawson, Marcus Scribner, Jake Weary, Irene Bedard	
A P R I L	7	One True Loves	The Avenue / BuzzFeed Studios	Andy Fickman (director); Taylor Jenkins Reid, Alex Jenkins Reid (screenplay); Phillipa Soo, Simu Liu, Luke Bracey	
A P R I L	12	Beautiful Disaster	Voltage Pictures	Roger Kumble (director/screenplay); Jamie McGuire (screenplay); Dylan Sprouse, Virginia Gardner, Austin North, Libe Barer, Brian Austin Green, Rob Estes	
A P R I L	14	Renfield	Universal Pictures / Skybound Entertainment	Chris McKay (director); Ryan Ridley (screenplay); Nicholas Hoult, Nicolas Cage, Awkwafina, Ben Schwartz, Adrian Martinez, Shohreh Aghdashloo	
A P R I L	14	Beau Is Afraid	A24 / Square Peg	Ari Aster (director/screenplay); Joaquin Phoenix, Patti LuPone, Nathan Lane, Amy Ryan, Parker Posey, Kylie Rogers, Denis Ménochet, Zoe Lister-Jones, Armen Nahapetian, Stephen McKinley Henderson, Richard Kind	
A P R I L	14	The Pope's Exorcist	Screen Gems	Julius Avery (director); Michael Petroni, Evan Spiliotopoulos (screenplay); Russell Crowe, Alex Essoe, Daniel Zovatto, Franco Nero, Ralph Ineson	
A P R I L	14	Mafia Mamma	Bleecker Street / Ingenious Media	Catherine Hardwicke (director); Michael J. Feldman, Debbie Jhoon (screenplay); Toni Collette, Monica Bellucci, Sophia Nomvete	
A P R I L	14	Sweetwater	Briarcliff Entertainment	Martin Guigui (director/screenplay); Everett Osborne, Cary Elwes, Jeremy Piven, Richard Dreyfuss, Kevin Pollak	
A P R I L	14	Nefarious	Soli Deo Gloria Releasing	Chuck Konzelman and Cary Solomon (director/screenplay); Sean Patrick Flanery, Jordan Belfi	
A P R I L	14	Rare Objects	IFC Films	Katie Holmes (director/screenplay); Phaedon A. Papadopoulos (screenplay); Julie Mayorga, Katie Holmes, Derek Luke, Alan Cumming	
A P R I L	20	Quasi	Hulu / Searchlight Pictures / Broken Lizard Productions	Kevin Heffernan (director/screenplay); Jay Chandrasekhar, Steve Lemme, Paul Soter, Erik Stolhanske (screenplay); Jay Chandrasekhar, Kevin Heffernan, Steve Lemme, Paul Soter, Erik Stolhanske, Adrianne Palicki	
A P R I L	21	Evil Dead Rise	Warner Bros. Pictures / New Line Cinema / Ghost House Pictures	Lee Cronin (director/screenplay); Lily Sullivan, Alyssa Sutherland, Morgan Davies, Gabrielle Echols, Nell Fisher	
A P R I L	21	Guy Ritchie's The Covenant	Metro-Goldwyn-Mayer / STXfilms	Guy Ritchie (director/screenplay); Ivan Atkinson, Marn Davies (screenplay); Jake Gyllenhaal, Dar Salim, Antony Starr, Alexander Ludwig, Bobby Schofield, Emily Beecham, Jonny Lee Miller	
A P R I L	21	Ghosted	Apple TV+ / Skydance Media	Dexter Fletcher (director); Rhett Reese, Paul Wernick, Chris McKenna, Erik Sommers (screenplay); Chris Evans, Ana de Armas, Adrien Brody, Mike Moh, Amy Sedaris, Tate Donovan, Tim Blake Nelson, Marwan Kenzari, Anna Deavere Smith	
A P R I L	21	Chevalier	Searchlight Pictures / Element Pictures	Stephen Williams (director); Stefani Robinson (screenplay); Kelvin Harrison Jr., Samara Weaving, Lucy Boynton, Marton Csokas, Alex Fitzalan, Minnie Driver	
A P R I L	21	Somewhere in Queens	Roadside Attractions / Lionsgate	Ray Romano (director/screenplay); Mark Stegemann (screenplay); Ray Romano, Laurie Metcalf, Jacob Ward, Sadie Stanley, Jennifer Esposito, Dierdre Friel, Jon Manfrellotti, Sebastian Maniscalco, Tony Lo Bianco	
A P R I L	21	Carmen	Sony Pictures Classics / Goalpost Pictures	Benjamin Millepied (director/screenplay); Alexander Dinelaris Jr., Loïc Barrère (screenplay); Melissa Barrera, Paul Mescal, Rossy de Palma, Tracy "The DOC" Curry	
A P R I L	21	A Tourist's Guide to Love	Netflix	Steven K. Tsuchida (director); Eirene Donohue (screenplay); Rachael Leigh Cook, Scott Ly, Missi Pyle, Ben Feldman, Nondumiso Tembe, Andrew Barth Feldman	
A P R I L	27	The Artifice Girl	XYZ Films	Franklin Ritch (director/screenplay); Lance Henriksen, Sinda Nichols, David Girard, Franklin Ritch, Tatum Matthews	
A P R I L	28	Peter Pan & Wendy	Disney+ / Walt Disney Pictures / Roth/Kirschenbaum Films	David Lowery (director/screenplay); Toby Halbrooks (screenplay); Jude Law, Alexander Molony, Ever Anderson, Yara Shahidi, Alyssa Wapanatâhk, Joshua Pickering, Jacobi Jupe, Molly Parker, Alan Tudyk, Jim Gaffigan	
A P R I L	28	Are You There God? It's Me, Margaret.	Lionsgate / Gracie Films	Kelly Fremon Craig (director/screenplay); Rachel McAdams, Abby Ryder Fortson, Elle Graham, Benny Safdie, Kathy Bates	
A P R I L	28	Big George Foreman	Affirm Films / Mandalay Pictures	George Tillman Jr. (director/screenplay); Frank Baldwin (screenplay); Khris Davis, Jasmine Mathews, John Magaro, Sullivan Jones, Lawrence Gilliard Jr., Sonja Sohn, Forest Whitaker	
A P R I L	28	Sisu	Lionsgate / Stage 6 Films	Jalmari Helander (director/screenplay); Jorma Tommila, Aksel Hennie, Jack Doolan, Mimosa Willamo, Onni Tommila	
A P R I L	28	Clock	Hulu / 20th Digital Studio	Alexis Jacknow (director/screenplay); Dianna Agron, Jay Ali, Melora Hardin, Saul Rubinek	
M A Y	5	Guardians of the Galaxy Vol. 3	Marvel Studios	James Gunn (director/screenplay); Chris Pratt, Zoe Saldaña, Dave Bautista, Karen Gillan, Pom Klementieff, Vin Diesel, Bradley Cooper, Sean Gunn, Chukwudi Iwuji, Will Poulter, Linda Cardellini, Nathan Fillion, Elizabeth Debicki, Maria Bakalova, Sylvester Stallone	
M A Y	5	Love Again	Screen Gems / Thunder Road Films	James C. Strouse (director/screenplay); Priyanka Chopra, Sam Heughan, Russell Tovey, Omid Djalili, Celia Imrie, Celine Dion	
M A Y	5	One Ranger	Lionsgate	Jesse V. Johnson (director/screenplay); Thomas Jane, John Malkovich, Dominique Tipper, Dean Jagger	
M A Y	12	Book Club: The Next Chapter	Focus Features / Fifth Season	Bill Holderman (director/screenplay); Erin Simms (screenplay); Diane Keaton, Jane Fonda, Candice Bergen, Mary Steenburgen, Craig T. Nelson, Giancarlo Giannini, Andy García, Don Johnson	
M A Y	12	Knights of the Zodiac	Stage 6 Films / Toei Animation	Tomasz Bagiński (director); Josh Campbell, Matt Stuecken, Kiel Murray (screenplay); Mackenyu, Famke Janssen, Madison Iseman, Diego Tinoco, Mark Dacascos, Nick Stahl, Sean Bean	
M A Y	12	Hypnotic	Ketchup Entertainment / Solstice Studios / Ingenious Media	Robert Rodriguez (director/screenplay); Max Borenstein (screenplay); Ben Affleck, Alice Braga, William Fichtner, J. D. Pardo, Hala Finley, Dayo Okeniyi, Jeff Fahey, Jackie Earle Haley	
M A Y	12	Fool's Paradise	Roadside Attractions / Lionsgate	Charlie Day (director/screenplay); Charlie Day, Ken Jeong, Kate Beckinsale, Adrien Brody, Jason Sudeikis, Edie Falco, Jason Bateman, Common, Ray Liotta, John Malkovich	
M A Y	12	Rally Road Racers	Kintop Pictures / Lipsync Post / REP Productions 6 Ltd. / Riverstone Pictures / Vanguard Animation / Virtuso Productions	Ross Venokur (director/screenplay); Jimmy O. Yang, J. K. Simmons, Chloe Bennet, Lisa Lu, Sharon Horgan, Catherine Tate, John Cleese	
M A Y	12	The Mother	Netflix / Nuyorican Productions / Vertigo Entertainment	Niki Caro (director); Misha Green, Andrea Berloff, Peter Craig (screenplay); Jennifer Lopez, Joseph Fiennes, Lucy Paez, Omari Hardwick, Paul Raci, Gael García Bernal	
M A Y	12	Crater	Disney+ / Walt Disney Pictures / 21 Laps Entertainment	Kyle Patrick Alvarez (director); John Griffin (screenplay); Isaiah Russell-Bailey, Mckenna Grace, Billy Barratt, Scott Mescudi	
M A Y	12	Mercy	Paramount Global Content Distribution	Tony Dean Smith (director); Alex Wright (screenplay); Jonathan Rhys Meyers, Jon Voight, Leah Gibson	
M A Y	12	Monica	IFC Films / Rai Cinema	Andrea Pallaoro (director/screenplay); Orlando Tirado (screenplay); Trace Lysette, Patricia Clarkson, Emily Browning, Joshua Close, Adriana Barraza	
M A Y	12	The Starling Girl	Bleecker Street / 2AM	Laurel Parmet (director/screenplay); Eliza Scanlen, Lewis Pullman, Wrenn Schmidt, Austin Abrams, Kyle Secor, Jimmi Simpson	
M A Y	19	Fast X	Universal Pictures / Original Film / One Race Films / Roth/Kirschenbaum Films	Louis Leterrier (director); Justin Lin, Zach Dean, Dan Mazeau (screenplay); Vin Diesel, Michelle Rodriguez, Tyrese Gibson, Ludacris, John Cena, Nathalie Emmanuel, Jordana Brewster, Sung Kang, Scott Eastwood, Daniela Melchior, Alan Ritchson, Helen Mirren, Brie Larson, Rita Moreno, Jason Statham, Jason Momoa, Charlize Theron	
M A Y	19	White Men Can't Jump	Hulu / 20th Century Studios	Calmatic (director); Kenya Barris, Doug Hall (screenplay); Sinqua Walls, Jack Harlow, Teyana Taylor, Laura Harrier, Vince Staples, Myles Bullock, Lance Reddick	
M A Y	19	Master Gardener	Magnolia Pictures / HanWay Films	Paul Schrader (director/screenplay); Joel Edgerton, Sigourney Weaver, Quintessa Swindell, Esai Morales	
M A Y	19	Sanctuary	Neon	Zachary Wigon (director); Micah Bloomberg (screenplay); Margaret Qualley, Christopher Abbott	
M A Y	19	Robots	Neon	Anthony Hines, Casper Christensen (directors/screenplay); Shailene Woodley, Jack Whitehall	
M A Y	19	Moon Garden	Oscilloscope	Ryan Stevens Harris (director/screenplay); Augie Duke, Haven Lee Harris, Morgana Ignis, Timothy Lee DePriest	
M A Y	26	The Little Mermaid	Walt Disney Pictures	Rob Marshall (director); David Magee (screenplay); Halle Bailey, Jonah Hauer-King, Daveed Diggs, Awkwafina, Jacob Tremblay, Noma Dumezweni, Javier Bardem, Melissa McCarthy	
M A Y	26	Kandahar	Open Road Films / Thunder Road Films	Ric Roman Waugh (director); Mitchell LaFortune (screenplay); Gerard Butler, Navid Negahban, Ali Fazal, Bahador Foladi, Nina Toussaint-White, Vassilis Koukalani, Mark Arnold, Corey Johnson, Travis Fimmel	
M A Y	26	The Machine	Screen Gems / Legendary Pictures	Peter Atencio (director); Kevin Biegel, Scotty Landes (screenplay); Bert Kreischer, Mark Hamill, Jimmy Tatro, Iva Babić, Stephanie Kurtzuba, Jessica Gabor	
M A Y	26	About My Father	Lionsgate	Laura Terruso (director); Sebastian Maniscalco, Austen Earl (screenplay); Sebastian Maniscalco, Robert De Niro, Leslie Bibb, Anders Holm, David Rasche, Kim Cattrall	
M A Y	26	You Hurt My Feelings	A24 / FilmNation Entertainment / Likely Story	Nicole Holofcener (director/screenplay); Julia Louis-Dreyfus, Tobias Menzies, Michaela Watkins, Arian Moayed, Owen Teague, Amber Tamblyn, David Cross, Jeannie Berlin	
M A Y	26	The Wrath of Becky	Quiver Distribution	Matt Angel, Suzanne Coote (directors); Matt Angel (screenplay); Lulu Wilson, Seann William Scott	
M A Y	29	Reality	HBO Films / Cinereach / Max	Tina Satter (director/screenplay); James Paul Dallas (screenplay); Sydney Sweeney, Marchánt Davis, Josh Hamilton	
J U N E	2	Spider-Man: Across the Spider-Verse	Columbia Pictures / Sony Pictures Animation / Marvel Entertainment / Pascal Pictures / Lord Miller Productions / Arad Productions	Joaquim Dos Santos, Kemp Powers, Justin K. Thompson (directors); Phil Lord, Christopher Miller, David Callaham (screenplay); Shameik Moore, Hailee Steinfeld, Brian Tyree Henry, Luna Lauren Vélez, Jake Johnson, Jason Schwartzman, Issa Rae, Karan Soni, Shea Whigham, Greta Lee, Daniel Kaluuya, Mahershala Ali, Oscar Isaac	
J U N E	2	The Boogeyman	20th Century Studios / 21 Laps Entertainment	Rob Savage (director); Scott Beck, Bryan Woods, Mark Heyman (screenplay); Sophie Thatcher, Chris Messina, Vivien Lyra Blair, Marin Ireland, Madison Hu, LisaGay Hamilton, David Dastmalchian	
J U N E	2	Past Lives	A24 / CJ ENM / Killer Films / 2AM	Celine Song (director/screenplay); Greta Lee, Teo Yoo, John Magaro	
J U N E	2	Shooting Stars	Peacock / Universal Pictures	Chris Robinson (director); Frank E. Flowers, Tony Rettenmaier, Juel Taylor (screenplay); Mookie Cook, Caleb McLaughlin, Algee Smith, Dermot Mulroney	
J U N E	9	Transformers: Rise of the Beasts	Paramount Pictures / Skydance Media / Hasbro Studios / New Republic Pictures / Bayhem Films / Di Bonaventura Pictures	Steven Caple Jr. (director); Joby Harold, Darnell Metayer, Josh Peters, Erich Hoeber, Jon Hoeber (screenplay); Anthony Ramos, Dominique Fishback, Luna Lauren Vélez, Peter Cullen, Ron Perlman, Peter Dinklage, Michelle Yeoh, Pete Davidson, Liza Koshy, Michaela Jaé Rodriguez, Colman Domingo	
J U N E	9	Flamin' Hot	Hulu / Disney+ / Searchlight Pictures	Eva Longoria (director); Lewis Colick, Linda Yvette Chávez (screenplay); Jesse Garcia, Annie Gonzalez, Dennis Haysbert, Tony Shalhoub	
J U N E	9	Dalíland	Magnolia Pictures	Mary Harron (director); John C. Walsh (screenplay); Ben Kingsley, Barbara Sukowa, Christopher Briney, Rupert Graves, Alexander Beyer, Andreja Pejić, Suki Waterhouse, Ezra Miller	
J U N E	15	Jagged Mind	Hulu / 20th Digital Studio	Kelley Kali (director); Allyson Morgan (screenplay); Maisie Richardson-Sellers, Shannon Woodward	
J U N E	16	The Flash	Warner Bros. Pictures / DC Studios	Andy Muschietti (director); Christina Hodson (screenplay); Ezra Miller, Sasha Calle, Michael Shannon, Ron Livingston, Maribel Verdú, Kiersey Clemons, Antje Traue, Michael Keaton	
J U N E	16	Elemental	Walt Disney Pictures / Pixar Animation Studios	Peter Sohn (director); John Hoberg, Kat Likkel, Brenda Hsueh (screenplay); Leah Lewis, Mamoudou Athie, Ronnie del Carmen, Shila Omni, Wendi McLendon-Covey, Catherine O'Hara	
J U N E	16	Asteroid City	Focus Features / Indian Paintbrush	Wes Anderson (director/screenplay); Roman Coppola (screenplay); Jason Schwartzman, Scarlett Johansson, Tom Hanks, Jeffrey Wright, Tilda Swinton, Bryan Cranston, Edward Norton, Adrien Brody, Liev Schreiber, Hope Davis, Stephen Park, Rupert Friend, Maya Hawke, Steve Carell, Matt Dillon, Hong Chau, Willem Dafoe, Margot Robbie, Tony Revolori, Jake Ryan, Jeff Goldblum	
J U N E	16	Extraction 2	Netflix / AGBO	Sam Hargrave (director); Joe Russo (screenplay); Chris Hemsworth, Golshifteh Farahani, Adam Bessa, Tornike Gogrichiani, Tinatin Dalakishvili, Daniel Bernhardt, Olga Kurylenko, Idris Elba	
J U N E	16	The Blackening	Lionsgate / MRC	Tim Story (director); Tracy Oliver, Dewayne Perkins (screenplay); Grace Byers, Jermaine Fowler, Melvin Gregg, X Mayo, Dewayne Perkins, Antoinette Robertson, Sinqua Walls, Jay Pharoah, Yvonne Orji	
J U N E	20	Surrounded	Metro-Goldwyn-Mayer / Bron Creative / Mandalay Pictures	Anthony Mandler (director); Andrew Pagana, Justin Thomas (screenplay); Letitia Wright, Jamie Bell, Michael K. Williams, Jeffrey Donovan, Brett Gelman, Luce Rains	
J U N E	23	No Hard Feelings	Columbia Pictures / Excellent Cadaver	Gene Stupnitsky (director/screenplay); John Phillips (screenplay); Jennifer Lawrence, Andrew Barth Feldman, Laura Benanti, Natalie Morales, Matthew Broderick	
J U N E	23	The Perfect Find	Netflix / AGC Studios	Numa Perrier (director); Leigh Davenport (screenplay); Gabrielle Union, Keith Powers, Aisha Hinds, D. B. Woodside, La La Anthony, Gina Torres	
J U N E	23	World's Best	Disney+ / Walt Disney Pictures	Roshan Sethi (director); Utkarsh Ambudkar, Jamie King (screenplay); Utkarsh Ambudkar, Manny Magnus, Punam Patel	
J U N E	23	God Is a Bullet	Wayward Entertainment / XYZ Films	Nick Cassavetes (director/screenplay); Nikolaj Coster-Waldau, Jamie Foxx, Maika Monroe, January Jones, Andrew Dice Clay	
J U N E	23	Wonderwell	Vertical Entertainment	Vlad Marsavin (director); William Brookfield (screenplay); Carrie Fisher, Rita Ora, Kiera Milward, Nell Tiger Free	
J U N E	30	Indiana Jones and the Dial of Destiny	Walt Disney Pictures / Lucasfilm	James Mangold (director/screenplay); Jez Butterworth, John-Henry Butterworth, David Koepp (screenplay); Harrison Ford, Phoebe Waller-Bridge, Antonio Banderas, John Rhys-Davies, Shaunette Renée Wilson, Thomas Kretschmann, Toby Jones, Boyd Holbrook, Ethann Isidore, Mads Mikkelsen, Karen Allen	
J U N E	30	Ruby Gillman, Teenage Kraken	Universal Pictures / DreamWorks Animation	Kirk DeMicco, Faryn Pearl (directors); Pam Brady, Brian C Brown, Elliott DiGuiseppi (screenplay); Lana Condor, Toni Collette, Annie Murphy, Sam Richardson, Liza Koshy, Will Forte, Blue Chapman, Colman Domingo, Jaboukie Young-White, Nicole Byer, Jane Fonda	
J U N E	30	Nimona	Netflix / Annapurna Pictures	Nick Bruno and Troy Quane (directors); Robert L. Baird, Lloyd Taylor (screenplay); Chloë Grace Moretz, Riz Ahmed, Eugene Lee Yang, Frances Conroy	
J U N E	30	Confidential Informant	Lionsgate	Michael Oblowitz (director/screenplay); Michael Kaycheck, Brooke Nasser (screenplay); Mel Gibson, Kate Bosworth, Dominic Purcell, Nick Stahl, Erik Valdez	
J U N E	30	Prisoner's Daughter	Vertical Entertainment	Catherine Hardwicke (director); Mark Bacci (screenplay); Kate Beckinsale, Brian Cox, Christopher Convery, Jon Huertas, Ernie Hudson	
J U N E	30	The Unseen	Goonworks Films	Vincent Shade (director); Jennifer A. Goodman (screenplay); R.J. Mitte, Christian Stolte, William Mark McCullough	

== July–September ==
Opening		Title	Production company	Cast and crew	Ref.
J U L Y	4	Sound of Freedom	Angel Studios / Santa Fe Films	Alejandro Monteverde (director/screenplay); Rod Barr (screenplay); Jim Caviezel, Mira Sorvino, Bill Camp	
J U L Y	7	Insidious: The Red Door	Screen Gems / Stage 6 Films / Blumhouse Productions	Patrick Wilson (director); Scott Teems (screenplay); Ty Simpkins, Patrick Wilson, Sinclair Daniel, Hiam Abbass, Rose Byrne	
J U L Y	7	Joy Ride	Lionsgate / Point Grey Pictures	Adele Lim (director); Cherry Chevapravatdumrong, Teresa Hsiao (screenplay); Ashley Park, Sherry Cola, Stephanie Hsu, Sabrina Wu	
J U L Y	7	The Out-Laws	Netflix / Happy Madison Productions	Tyler Spindel (director); Evan Turner, Ben Zazove (screenplay); Adam DeVine, Nina Dobrev, Ellen Barkin, Pierce Brosnan	
J U L Y	7	Earth Mama	A24 / Film4 Productions / Academy Films	Savanna Leaf (director/screenplay); Tia Nomore, Erika Alexander, Doechii, Sharon Duncan-Brewster, Keta Price, Olivia Luccardi, Dominic Fike, Bokeem Woodbine	
J U L Y	7	Biosphere	IFC Films / Duplass Brothers Productions	Mel Eslyn (director/screenplay); Mark Duplass (screenplay); Sterling K. Brown, Mark Duplass	
J U L Y	7	Cocaine Shark	Wild Eye Releasing / Polonia Brothers Entertainment	Mark Polonia (director); Bando Glutz (screenplay); Samantha Coolidge, Ryan Dalton, Natalie Himmelberger, Titus Himmelberger, Jeff Kirkendall, Noyes J. Lawton, Ken Van Sant, Kevin Coolidge	
J U L Y	12	Mission: Impossible – Dead Reckoning Part One	Paramount Pictures / Skydance Media / TC Productions	Christopher McQuarrie (director/screenplay); Erik Jendresen (screenplay); Tom Cruise, Hayley Atwell, Ving Rhames, Simon Pegg, Rebecca Ferguson, Vanessa Kirby, Esai Morales, Pom Klementieff, Mariela Garriga, Henry Czerny	
J U L Y	14	They Cloned Tyrone	Netflix / MACRO Media	Juel Taylor (director/screenplay); Tony Rettenmaier (screenplay); John Boyega, Teyonah Parris, Jamie Foxx, David Alan Grier, Kiefer Sutherland	
J U L Y	14	Theater Camp	Searchlight Pictures / Topic Studios / Gloria Sanchez Productions	Molly Gordon, Nick Lieberman (directors/screenplay); Ben Platt, Noah Galvin (screenplay); Noah Galvin, Molly Gordon, Ben Platt, Jimmy Tatro, Patti Harrison, Nathan Lee Graham, Ayo Edebiri, Owen Thiele, Caroline Aaron, Amy Sedaris	
J U L Y	21	Barbie	Warner Bros. Pictures / Heyday Films / LuckyChap Entertainment / Mattel Films	Greta Gerwig (director/screenplay); Noah Baumbach (screenplay); Margot Robbie, Ryan Gosling, America Ferrera, Kate McKinnon, Issa Rae, Rhea Perlman, Will Ferrell	
J U L Y	21	Oppenheimer	Universal Pictures / Syncopy / Atlas Entertainment	Christopher Nolan (director/screenplay); Cillian Murphy, Emily Blunt, Matt Damon, Robert Downey Jr., Florence Pugh, Josh Hartnett, Casey Affleck, Rami Malek, Kenneth Branagh	
J U L Y	21	Cobweb	Lionsgate / Point Grey Pictures	Samuel Bodin (director); Chris Thomas Devlin (screenplay); Lizzy Caplan, Woody Norman, Cleopatra Coleman, Antony Starr	
J U L Y	21	The Beanie Bubble	Apple TV+ / Imagine Entertainment	Kristin Gore, Damian Kulash (directors); Kristin Gore (screenplay); Zach Galifianakis, Elizabeth Banks, Sarah Snook, Geraldine Viswanathan	
J U L Y	21	The Venture Bros.: Radiant Is the Blood of the Baboon Heart	Warner Bros. Home Entertainment / Williams Street / Astro Base GO! / Titmouse, Inc.	Jackson Publick (director/screenplay); Doc Hammer (screenplay); James Urbaniak, Patrick Warburton, Michael Sinterniklaas, Chris McCulloch, Doc Hammer	
J U L Y	27	Zoey 102	Paramount+ / Nickelodeon Movies / AwesomenessTV	Nancy Hower (director); Monica Sherer, Madeline Whitby (screenplay); Jamie Lynn Spears, Erin Sanders, Sean Flynn, Christopher Massey, Matthew Underwood, Abby Wilde, Jack Salvatore Jr., Owen Thiele, Thomas Lennon, Dean Geyer, Katelynn Bennett	
J U L Y	28	Haunted Mansion	Walt Disney Pictures / Rideback	Justin Simien (director); Katie Dippold (screenplay); LaKeith Stanfield, Tiffany Haddish, Owen Wilson, Danny DeVito, Rosario Dawson, Dan Levy, Jamie Lee Curtis, Jared Leto	
J U L Y	28	Sympathy for the Devil	RLJE Films / Hammerstone Studios	Yuval Adler (director); Luke Paradise (screenplay); Nicolas Cage, Joel Kinnaman	
J U L Y	28	Circus Maximus	AMC Entertainment	Travis Scott, Gaspar Noé, Valdimar Jóhannsson, Nicolas Winding Refn, Harmony Korine, Kahlil Joseph (directors); Travis Scott (screenplay); Travis Scott, Rick Rubin, James Blake, Sheck Wes, Yung Lean, Teezo Touchdown	
J U L Y	28	Happiness for Beginners	Netflix	Vicky Wright (director/screenplay); Ellie Kemper, Luke Grimes, Nico Santos, Blythe Danner	
J U L Y	28	War Pony	Momentum Pictures	Riley Keough, Gina Gammell (directors/screenplay); Franklin Sioux Bob, Bill Reddy (screenplay); Jojo Bapteise Whiting, Ladainian Crazy Thunder	
J U L Y	28	The Unknown Country	Music Box Pictures / Cold Iron Pictures	Morissa Maltz (director/screenplay); Lily Gladstone, Raymond Lee, Richard Ray Whitman, Lainey Bearkiller Shangreaux, Devin Shangreaux, Jasmine Bearkiller Shangreaux	
A U G U S T	1	Blue Hour: The Disappearance of Nick Brandreth	Glass House Distribution	Dan Bowhers (director/screenplay); Morgan DeTogne, Michael Kowalski, Mike Headford, Nick Brandreth, Josh Olkowski, Kathryn Schott	
A U G U S T	2	Teenage Mutant Ninja Turtles: Mutant Mayhem	Paramount Pictures / Nickelodeon Movies / Point Grey Pictures	Jeff Rowe (director/screenplay); Seth Rogen, Evan Goldberg, Dan Hernandez, Benji Samit (screenplay); Micah Abbey, Shamon Brown Jr., Nicolas Cantu, Brady Noon, Ayo Edebiri, Maya Rudolph, John Cena, Seth Rogen, Rose Byrne, Natasia Demetriou, Giancarlo Esposito, Jackie Chan, Ice Cube, Paul Rudd, Post Malone, Hannibal Buress	
A U G U S T	2	Mike & Fred vs The Dead	Leone Films / Midnight Releasing	Anthony Leone (director/screenplay); Felissa Rose, George Jac, Brian Patrick Butler, Michael C. Burgess, Sadie Katz, Jayce Venditti, Nick Young	
A U G U S T	4	Meg 2: The Trench	Warner Bros. Pictures / CMC Pictures / Di Bonaventura Pictures	Ben Wheatley (director); Jon Hoeber, Erich Hoeber, Dean Georgaris (screenplay); Jason Statham, Wu Jing, Sophia Cai, Page Kennedy, Sergio Peris-Mencheta, Skyler Samuels, Cliff Curtis	
A U G U S T	4	Shortcomings	Sony Pictures Classics / Topic Studios / Roadside Attractions	Randall Park (director); Adrian Tomine (screenplay); Justin H. Min, Sherry Cola, Ally Maki, Debby Ryan, Tavi Gevinson, Sonoya Mizuno, Jacob Batalon, Timothy Simons	
A U G U S T	4	Dreamin' Wild	Roadside Attractions / River Road Entertainment	Bill Pohlad (director/screenplay); Casey Affleck, Walton Goggins, Zooey Deschanel, Noah Jupe, Jack Dylan Grazer, Chris Messina, Beau Bridges	
A U G U S T	4	Corner Office	Lionsgate / Grindstone Entertainment Group / Anonymous Content	Joachim Back (director); Ted Kupper (screenplay); Jon Hamm, Danny Pudi, Sarah Gadon, Christopher Heyerdahl	
A U G U S T	4	What Comes Around	IFC Films	Amy Redford (director); Scott Organ (screenplay); Summer Phoenix, Grace Van Dien, Jesse Garcia, Kyle Gallner	
A U G U S T	4	The Passenger	MGM+ / Blumhouse Productions	Carter Smith (director); Jack Stanley (screenplay); Johnny Berchtold, Kyle Gallner	
A U G U S T	11	The Last Voyage of the Demeter	Universal Pictures / DreamWorks Pictures / Reliance Entertainment / Phoenix Pictures	André Øvredal (director); Bragi F. Schut, Zak Olkewicz (screenplay); Corey Hawkins, Aisling Franciosi, Liam Cunningham, David Dastmalchian	
A U G U S T	11	Heart of Stone	Netflix / Skydance Media	Tom Harper (director); Greg Rucka, Allison Schroeder (screenplay); Gal Gadot, Jamie Dornan, Alia Bhatt, Matthias Schweighöfer, Sophie Okonedo	
A U G U S T	11	Red, White & Royal Blue	Amazon Studios / Berlanti-Schechter Films	Matthew Lopez (director/screenplay); Ted Malawer (screenplay); Taylor Zakhar Perez, Nicholas Galitzine, Clifton Collins Jr., Sarah Shahi, Rachel Hilson, Stephen Fry, Uma Thurman	
A U G U S T	11	Jules	Bleecker Street / Big Beach	Marc Turtletaub (director); Gavin Steckler (screenplay); Ben Kingsley, Jane Curtin, Harriet Sansom Harris	
A U G U S T	11	Inside Man	Global Ascension / 2B Films / Wild7 Films	Danny A. Abeckaser (director); Kosta Kondilopoulos (screenplay); Emile Hirsch, Jake Cannavale, Lucy Hale, Ashley Greene, Greg Finley, Danny A. Abeckaser	
A U G U S T	18	Blue Beetle	Warner Bros. Pictures / DC Studios	Ángel Manuel Soto (director); Gareth Dunnet-Alcocer (screenplay); Xolo Maridueña, Adriana Barraza, Damián Alcázar, Elpidia Carrillo, Bruna Marquezine, Raoul Max Trujillo, Susan Sarandon, George Lopez	
A U G U S T	18	Strays	Universal Pictures / Lord Miller Productions	Josh Greenbaum (director); Dan Perrault (screenplay); Will Ferrell, Jamie Foxx, Will Forte, Isla Fisher, Randall Park, Josh Gad, Harvey Guillén, Rob Riggle, Brett Gelman, Jamie Demetriou, Sofia Vergara	
A U G U S T	18	The Monkey King	Netflix / Reel FX Animation	Anthony Stacchi (director); Steve Bencich, Ron J. Friedman (screenplay); Jimmy O. Yang, Lin Jolie Hoang-Rappaport, Bowen Yang, Jo Koy, Stephanie Hsu, BD Wong	
A U G U S T	18	Back on the Strip	GVN Releasing / Luminosity Entertainment	Chris Spencer (director/screenplay); Eric Daniel (screenplay); Wesley Snipes, J. B. Smoove, Gary Owen, Bill Bellamy, Spence Moore II, Raigan Harris, Faizon Love, Tiffany Haddish	
A U G U S T	18	Landscape with Invisible Hand	Metro-Goldwyn-Mayer / Plan B Entertainment / Annapurna Pictures	Cory Finley (director/screenplay); Asante Blackk, Kylie Rogers, Tiffany Haddish	
A U G U S T	18	Birth/Rebirth	Shudder / Retrospecter Films / Elfman + Viste	Laura Moss (director); Laura Moss, Brendan J. O'Brien (screenplay); Marin Ireland, Judy Reyes, A.J. Lister, Breda Wool, Monique Gabriela Curnen, Grant Harrison, LaChanze, Rina Meija	
A U G U S T	18	The Adults	Variance Films	Dustin Guy Defa (director/screenplay); Michael Cera, Hannah Gross, Sophia Lillis	
A U G U S T	25	Gran Turismo	Columbia Pictures / PlayStation Productions / Trigger Street Productions	Neill Blomkamp (director); Jason Hall, Zach Baylin (screenplay); David Harbour, Orlando Bloom, Archie Madekwe, Darren Barnet, Geri Halliwell Horner, Djimon Hounsou	
A U G U S T	25	Retribution	Lionsgate / Roadside Attractions / StudioCanal / The Picture Company	Nimród Antal (director); Chris Salmanpour (screenplay); Liam Neeson, Noma Dumezweni, Lilly Aspell, Jack Champion, Embeth Davidtz, Matthew Modine	
A U G U S T	25	Vacation Friends 2	Hulu / 20th Century Studios	Clay Tarver (director/screenplay); John Cena, Lil Rel Howery, Yvonne Orji, Meredith Hagner, Carlos Santos, Ronny Chieng, Jamie Hector, Steve Buscemi	
A U G U S T	25	You Are So Not Invited to My Bat Mitzvah	Netflix / Happy Madison Productions	Sammi Cohen (director); Alison Peck (screenplay); Sunny Sandler, Samantha Lorraine, Adam Sandler, Idina Menzel, Jackie Sandler, Sadie Sandler, Dylan Hoffman, Jackie Hoffman, Luis Guzmán	
A U G U S T	25	Bottoms	Orion Pictures / Brownstone Productions	Emma Seligman (director/screenplay); Rachel Sennott (screenplay); Rachel Sennott, Ayo Edebiri, Havana Rose Liu, Kaia Gerber, Nicholas Galitzine, Dagmara Domińczyk, Marshawn Lynch	
A U G U S T	25	Golda	Bleecker Street / Embankment Films / Qwerty Films	Guy Nattiv (director); Nicholas Martin (screenplay); Helen Mirren, Camille Cottin, Liev Schreiber	
A U G U S T	25	MR-9: Do or Die	Chasing Butterflies Pictures / Premiere Entertainment / Al Bravo Films / Avail Entertainment / Jaaz Multimedia	Asif Akbar (director & screenplay); AMB Sumon, Sakshi Pradhan, Frank Grillo, Michael Jai White, Tariq Anam Khan, Jessia Islam	
A U G U S T	25	The Hill	Briarcliff Entertainment	Jeff Celentano (director); Scott Marshall Smith, Angelo Pizzo (screenplay); Colin Ford, Dennis Quaid, Joelle Carter, Scott Glenn	
S E P T E M B E R	1	The Equalizer 3	Columbia Pictures / Escape Artists	Antoine Fuqua (director); Richard Wenk (screenplay); Denzel Washington, Dakota Fanning, Eugenio Mastrandrea, David Denman, Gaia Scodellaro, Remo Girone	
S E P T E M B E R	1	The Good Mother	Vertical Entertainment	Miles Joris-Peyrafitte (director/screenplay); Madison Harrison (screenplay); Hilary Swank, Olivia Cooke, Jack Reynor, Hopper Penn	
S E P T E M B E R	1	All Fun and Games	Vertical Entertainment / AGBO	Ari Costa, Eren Celeboglu (director/screenplay); J.J. Braider (screenplay); Natalia Dyer, Asa Butterfield, Benjamin Evan Ainsworth, Laurel Marsden, Kolton Stewart, Annabeth Gish	
S E P T E M B E R	7	Yoshiki: Under the Sky	A List Media Entertainment	Yoshiki (director); Yoshiki, Sarah Brightman, Jane Zhang, Scorpions, SixTones, Nicole Scherzinger, St. Vincent, Sugizo, Hyde, Lindsey Stirling, The Chainsmokers	
S E P T E M B E R	8	The Nun II	Warner Bros. Pictures / New Line Cinema / Atomic Monster	Michael Chaves (director); Ian Goldberg, Richard Naing, Akela Cooper (screenplay); Taissa Farmiga, Jonas Bloquet, Storm Reid, Anna Popplewell, Bonnie Aarons	
S E P T E M B E R	8	My Big Fat Greek Wedding 3	Focus Features / Playtone / Gold Circle Entertainment / HBO Films	Nia Vardalos (director/screenplay); Nia Vardalos, John Corbett, Louis Mandylor, Elena Kampouris, Gia Carides, Joey Fatone, Lainie Kazan, Andrea Martin	
S E P T E M B E R	8	Sitting in Bars with Cake	Amazon Studios	Trish Sie (director); Audrey Shulman (screenplay); Yara Shahidi, Odessa A'zion, Martha Kelly, Ron Livingston, Bette Midler	
S E P T E M B E R	8	Aristotle and Dante Discover the Secrets of the Universe	Blue Fox Entertainment	Aitch Alberto (director/screenplay); Max Pelayo, Reese Gonzales, Eugenio Derbez, Eva Longoria	
S E P T E M B E R	13	After Everything	Voltage Pictures	Castille Landon (director/screenplay); Josephine Langford, Hero Fiennes Tiffin, Louise Lombard, Chance Perdomo, Kiana Madeira, Rob Estes, Arielle Kebbel, Carter Jenkins, Anton Kottas, Stephen Moyer	
S E P T E M B E R	15	A Haunting in Venice	20th Century Studios / Scott Free Productions / Genre Films	Kenneth Branagh (director); Michael Green (screenplay); Kenneth Branagh, Kyle Allen, Camille Cottin, Jamie Dornan, Tina Fey, Jude Hill, Ali Khan, Emma Laird, Kelly Reilly, Riccardo Scamarcio, Michelle Yeoh	
S E P T E M B E R	15	Dumb Money	Columbia Pictures / Stage 6 Films / Black Bear Pictures	Craig Gillespie (director); Lauren Schuker Blum, Rebecca Angelo (screenplay); Paul Dano, Pete Davidson, Vincent D'Onofrio, America Ferrera, Nick Offerman, Anthony Ramos, Sebastian Stan, Shailene Woodley, Seth Rogen	
S E P T E M B E R	15	Love at First Sight	Netflix	Vanessa Caswill (director); Katie Lovejoy (screenplay); Haley Lu Richardson, Ben Hardy, Dexter Fletcher, Rob Delaney, Sally Phillips, Jameela Jamil	
S E P T E M B E R	15	A Million Miles Away	Amazon Studios	Alejandra Márquez Abella (director/screenplay); Bettina Gilois, Hernán Jiménez (screenplay); Michael Peña, Rosa Salazar, Sarayu Blue, Verónica Falcón, Julio Cesar Cedillo, Garret Dillahunt	
S E P T E M B E R	15	The Retirement Plan	Falling Forward Films / Productivity Media / Darius Films	Tim Brown (director/screenplay); Nicolas Cage, Ron Perlman, Ashley Greene, Jackie Earle Haley, Grace Byers, Ernie Hudson, Lynn Whitfield, Joel David Moore, Thalia Campbell	
S E P T E M B E R	15	Outlaw Johnny Black	Samuel Goldwyn Films	Michael Jai White (director/screenplay); Michael Jai White, Anika Noni Rose, Erica Ash, Byron Minns, Kevin Chapman, Kym Whitley, Tommy Davidson, Buddy Lewis, Chris Browning, Barry Bostwick, Gary Anthony Williams, Tony Baker, Glynn Turman	
S E P T E M B E R	15	Camp Hideout	Roadside Attractions	Sean Olson (director); Dave DeBorde, C. Neil Davenport, Kat Olson (screenplay); Ethan Drew, Corbin Bleu, Amanda Leighton, Christopher Lloyd	
S E P T E M B E R	15	The Inventor	Blue Fox Entertainment	Jim Capobianco (director/screenplay); Stephen Fry, Marion Cotillard, Daisy Ridley, Matt Berry, Natalie Palamides, Jim Capobianco	
S E P T E M B E R	22	Expend4bles	Lionsgate / Millennium Media	Scott Waugh (director); Kurt Wimmer, Tad Daggerhart, Max Adams (screenplay); Jason Statham, Sylvester Stallone, Megan Fox, 50 Cent, Randy Couture, Tony Jaa, Iko Uwais, Jacob Scipio, Levy Tran, Andy García, Dolph Lundgren	
S E P T E M B E R	22	Spy Kids: Armageddon	Netflix / Skydance Media / Spyglass Media Group / Troublemaker Studios	Robert Rodriguez (director/screenplay); Racer Max (screenplay); Gina Rodriguez, Zachary Levi, Everly Carganilla, Connor Esterson, Billy Magnussen, D. J. Cotrona	
S E P T E M B E R	22	Reptile	Netflix / Black Label Media	Grant Singer (director/screenplay); Benjamin Brewer, Benicio del Toro (screenplay); Benicio del Toro, Justin Timberlake, Alicia Silverstone, Eric Bogosian, Ato Essandoh, Domenick Lombardozzi, Michael Pitt	
S E P T E M B E R	22	Cassandro	Amazon Studios / Escape Artists	Roger Ross Williams (director/screenplay); David Teague (screenplay); Gael García Bernal, Roberta Colindrez, Perla De La Rosa, Joaquín Cosío, Raúl Castillo, El Hijo del Santo, Bad Bunny	
S E P T E M B E R	22	Flora and Son	Apple TV+ / FilmNation Entertainment / Likely Story	John Carney (director/screenplay); Eve Hewson, Jack Reynor, Orén Kinlan, Joseph Gordon-Levitt	
S E P T E M B E R	22	No One Will Save You	Hulu / 20th Century Studios	Brian Duffield (director/screenplay); Kaitlyn Dever	
S E P T E M B E R	22	It Lives Inside	Neon / Brightlight Pictures	Bishal Dutta (director/screenplay); Megan Suri, Neeru Bajwa, Mohana Krishnan, Vik Sahay, Gage Marsh, Beatrice Kitsos, Betty Gabriel	
S E P T E M B E R	22	Everybody Dies by the End	Terror Films / Children of Celluloid	Ian Tripp, Ryan Schafer (directors); Ian Tripp (screenplay); Vinny Curran, Bill Oberst Jr., Brendan Cahalan, Iliyana Apostolova, Ian Tripp, Joshua Wyble, Ryan Schafer, Caroline Amiguet, Paul Fisher III, Alan Vazquez	
S E P T E M B E R	26	The Kill Room	Shout! Studios / Yale Entertainment	Nicol Paone (director); Jonathan Jacobson (screenplay); Uma Thurman, Joe Manganiello, Maya Hawke, Debi Mazar, Dree Hemingway, Samuel L. Jackson	
S E P T E M B E R	29	The Creator	20th Century Studios / Regency Enterprises / Entertainment One	Gareth Edwards (director/screenplay); Chris Weitz (screenplay); John David Washington, Gemma Chan, Ken Watanabe, Sturgill Simpson, Madeleine Yuna Voyles, Allison Janney	
S E P T E M B E R	29	Saw X	Lionsgate / Twisted Pictures	Kevin Greutert (director); Josh Stolberg, Peter Goldfinger (screenplay); Tobin Bell, Shawnee Smith, Synnøve Macody Lund, Steven Brand, Renata Vacal, Michael Beach	
S E P T E M B E R	29	Fair Play	Netflix / MRC / T-Street Productions	Chloe Domont (director/screenplay); Phoebe Dynevor, Alden Ehrenreich, Eddie Marsan, Rich Sommer	
S E P T E M B E R	29	Heist 88	Showtime / Paramount+	Menhaj Huda (director); Dwayne Johnson-Cochran (screenplay); Courtney B. Vance, Keesha Sharp, Keith David	
S E P T E M B E R	29	The Re-Education of Molly Singer	Lionsgate	Andy Palmer (director); Todd Friedman, Kevin Haskins (screenplay); Britt Robertson, Ty Simpkins, Nico Santos, Cierra Ramirez, Holland Roden, Wendie Malick, Jaime Pressly	
S E P T E M B E R	29	Deliver Us	Magnet Releasing	Lee Roy Kunz, Cru Ennis (directors); Lee Roy Kunz, Kane Kunz (screenplay); Lee Roy Kunz, Maria Vera Ratti, Alexander Siddig, Jaune Kimmel, Thomas Kretschmann	

== October–December ==
Opening		Title	Production company	Cast and crew	Ref.
O C T O B E R	1	Oracle	Max / Universal Pictures / Will Packer Productions	Daniel Di Grado (director); Michael Ross, Corey Harrell (screenplay); Ryan Destiny, Heather Graham	
O C T O B E R	2	Appendage	Hulu / 20th Digital Studio	Anna Zlokovic (director/screenplay); Hadley Robinson, Emily Hampshire, Brandon Mychal Smith, Kausar Mohammed, Desmin Borges, Deborah Rennard	
O C T O B E R	6	The Exorcist: Believer	Universal Pictures / Blumhouse Productions / Morgan Creek Entertainment	David Gordon Green (director/screenplay); Peter Sattler (screenplay); Leslie Odom Jr., Lidya Jewett, Olivia O’Neill, Jennifer Nettles, Norbert Leo Butz, Ann Dowd, Ellen Burstyn	
O C T O B E R	6	Pet Sematary: Bloodlines	Paramount+ / Paramount Players / Di Bonaventura Pictures	Lindsey Anderson Beer (director/screenplay); Jeff Buhler (screenplay); Jackson White, Jack Mulhern, Henry Thomas, Forrest Goodluck, Natalie Alyn Lind, Isabella Star LaBlanc, Pam Grier, David Duchovny	
O C T O B E R	6	Totally Killer	Amazon Studios / Blumhouse Productions	Nahnatchka Khan (director); David Matalon, Sasha Perl-Raver, Jen D'Angelo (screenplay); Kiernan Shipka, Olivia Holt, Julie Bowen, Randall Park	
O C T O B E R	6	V/H/S/85	Studio 71 / Bloody Disgusting	Mike P. Nelson, Gigi Saul Guerrero (directors/screenplay); Scott Derrickson, David Bruckner, Natasha Kermani (directors); Jordan Belfi, Kelli Garner, Gabriela Roel, Gigi Saul Guerrero, Chivonne Michelle, James Ransone, Freddy Rodriguez, Britt Baron	
O C T O B E R	6	The Caine Mutiny Court-Martial	Republic Pictures / Showtime / Paramount+	William Friedkin (director/screenplay); Kiefer Sutherland, Lance Reddick, Jason Clarke, Jake Lacy, Monica Raymund, Lewis Pullman, Jay Duplass, Tom Riley	
O C T O B E R	6	Dicks: The Musical	A24 / Chernin Entertainment	Larry Charles (director); Aaron Jackson, Josh Sharp (screenplay); Megan Mullally, Megan Thee Stallion, Bowen Yang, Nathan Lane, Aaron Jackson, Josh Sharp	
O C T O B E R	6	Foe	Amazon Studios / See-Saw Films / Anonymous Content	Garth Davis (director/screenplay); Iain Reid (screenplay); Saoirse Ronan, Paul Mescal, Aaron Pierre	
O C T O B E R	6	She Came to Me	Vertical Entertainment / Killer Films	Rebecca Miller (director/screenplay); Peter Dinklage, Marisa Tomei, Joanna Kulig, Brian d'Arcy James, Anne Hathaway	
O C T O B E R	6	The Burial	Amazon Studios / Maven Screen Media	Maggie Betts (director/screenplay); Doug Wright (screenplay); Jamie Foxx, Tommy Lee Jones, Jurnee Smollett, Mamoudou Athie, Bill Camp, Pamela Reed, Alan Ruck	
O C T O B E R	6	Desperation Road	Lionsgate	Nadine Crocker (director); Michael Farris Smith (screenplay); Garrett Hedlund, Mel Gibson, Willa Fitzgerald, Ryan Hurst	
O C T O B E R	6	Miranda's Victim	Vertical Entertainment	Michelle Danner (director); J. Craig Stiles (screenplay); Abigail Breslin, Luke Wilson, Andy García, Donald Sutherland, Sebastian Quinn, Ryan Phillippe	
O C T O B E R	6	Cat Person	Rialto Pictures / StudioCanal	Susanna Fogel (director); Michelle Ashford (screenplay); Emilia Jones, Nicholas Braun, Geraldine Viswanathan, Hope Davis, Fred Melamed, Isabella Rossellini	
O C T O B E R	9	The Mill	Hulu / 20th Digital Studio	Sean King O'Grady (director); Jeffrey David Thomas (screenplay); Lil Rel Howery, Scoot McNairy, Pat Healy	
O C T O B E R	10	Down Low	Stage 6 Films / FilmNation Entertainment	Rightor Doyle (director); Phoebe Fisher, Lukas Gage (screenplay); Zachary Quinto, Lukas Gage, Simon Rex, Audra McDonald, Judith Light	
O C T O B E R	11	Dark Harvest	Metro-Goldwyn-Mayer	David Slade (director); Michael Gilio (screenplay); Casey Likes, E'myri Crutchfield, Dustin Ceithamer, Elizabeth Reaser, Luke Kirby, Jeremy Davies	
O C T O B E R	13	Taylor Swift: The Eras Tour	AMC Entertainment / Cinemark Theatres / Taylor Swift Productions	Sam Wrench (director); Taylor Swift	
O C T O B E R	13	Dear David	Lionsgate / BuzzFeed Studios	John McPhail (director); Mike Van Waes (screenplay); Augustus Prew, Andrea Bang, Justin Long	
O C T O B E R	13	Divinity	Utopia	Eddie Alcazar (director/screenplay); Stephen Dorff, Bella Thorne, Scott Bakula, Jason Genao, Moisés Arias, Karrueche Tran, Caylee Cowan	
O C T O B E R	13	In the Fire	Saban Films	Conor Allyn (director/screenplay); Pascal Borno, Silvio Muraglia (screenplay); Amber Heard, Eduardo Noriega, Lorenzo McGovern Zaini	
O C T O B E R	20	Killers of the Flower Moon	Paramount Pictures / Apple Studios / Sikelia Productions / Appian Way Productions	Martin Scorsese (director/screenplay); Eric Roth (screenplay); Leonardo DiCaprio, Robert De Niro, Lily Gladstone, Jesse Plemons, Tantoo Cardinal, John Lithgow, Brendan Fraser	
O C T O B E R	20	Pain Hustlers	Netflix	David Yates (director); Wells Tower (screenplay); Emily Blunt, Chris Evans, Andy García, Catherine O'Hara, Jay Duplass, Brian d'Arcy James, Chloe Coleman	
O C T O B E R	20	Nyad	Netflix / Black Bear Pictures	Elizabeth Chai Vasarhelyi, Jimmy Chin (directors); Julia Cox (screenplay); Annette Bening, Jodie Foster, Rhys Ifans	
O C T O B E R	20	Old Dads	Netflix / Miramax	Bill Burr (director/screenplay); Ben Tishler (screenplay); Bill Burr, Bobby Cannavale, Bokeem Woodbine, Miles Robbins, Katie Aselton, Reign Edwards	
O C T O B E R	20	Butcher's Crossing	Saban Films / Altitude Film Entertainment	Gabe Polsky (director/screenplay); Liam Satre-Meloy (screenplay); Nicolas Cage, Fred Hechinger, Xander Berkeley, Rachel Keller, Jeremy Bobb, Paul Raci	
O C T O B E R	20	The Other Zoey	Brainstorm Media	Sara Zandieh (director); Matt Tabak (screenplay); Josephine Langford, Drew Starkey, Archie Renaux, Mallori Johnson, Patrick Fabian, Heather Graham, Andie MacDowell	
O C T O B E R	20	Sick Girl	Lionsgate / Grindstone Entertainment	Jennifer Cram (director/screenplay); Nina Dobrev, Brandon Mychal Smith, Sherry Cola, Stephanie Koenig, Hayley Magnus, Ray McKinnon, Dan Bakkedahl, Wendi McLendon-Covey	
O C T O B E R	20	The Persian Version	Sony Pictures Classics / Stage 6 Films	Maryam Keshavarz (director/screenplay); Layla Mohammadi, Niousha Noor, Bijan Daneshmand, Bella Warda, Tom Byrne	
O C T O B E R	27	Five Nights at Freddy's	Universal Pictures / Blumhouse Productions	Emma Tammi (director/screenplay); Scott Cawthon, Seth Cuddeback (screenplay); Josh Hutcherson, Elizabeth Lail, Piper Rubio, Mary Stuart Masterson, Matthew Lillard	
O C T O B E R	27	Under the Boardwalk	Paramount Animation	David Soren (director/screenplay); Lorene Scafaria (screenplay); Keke Palmer, Michael Cera, Bobby Cannavale	
O C T O B E R	27	Freelance	Relativity Media / AGC Studios	Pierre Morel (director); Jacob Lentz (screenplay); John Cena, Alison Brie, Juan Pablo Raba, Alice Eve, Marton Csokas, Christian Slater	
O C T O B E R	27	The Holdovers	Focus Features / Miramax	Alexander Payne (director); David Hemingson (screenplay); Paul Giamatti, Da'Vine Joy Randolph, Dominic Sessa	
O C T O B E R	27	The Killer	Netflix / Plan B Entertainment / Boom! Studios	David Fincher (director); Andrew Kevin Walker (screenplay); Michael Fassbender, Arliss Howard, Charles Parnell, Kerry O'Malley, Sala Baker, Sophie Charlotte, Tilda Swinton	
O C T O B E R	27	Fingernails	Apple TV+ / FilmNation Entertainment / Dirty Films	Christos Nikou (director/screenplay); Sam Steiner, Stavros Raptis (screenplay); Jessie Buckley, Riz Ahmed, Jeremy Allen White, Annie Murphy, Luke Wilson	
O C T O B E R	27	Priscilla	A24 / American Zoetrope / The Apartment Pictures	Sofia Coppola (director/screenplay); Cailee Spaeny, Jacob Elordi, Dagmara Domińczyk	
O C T O B E R	27	Suitable Flesh	RLJE Films / Shudder	Joe Lynch (director); Dennis Paoli (screenplay); Heather Graham, Judah Lewis, Bruce Davison, Johnathon Schaech, Barbara Crampton	
O C T O B E R	30	Hell House LLC Origins: The Carmichael Manor	Shudder / Terror Films	Stephen Cognetti (director/screenplay); Bridget Rose Perrotta, Destiny Leilani Brown, James Liddell, Gideon Berger	
N O V E M B E R	2	What Happened at 625 River Road?	Freestyle Digital Media	Devon Jovi Johnson (director/screenplay); Allen Worrell (screenplay); Francheska Pujols, Summer Foley, Silvana Jakich, Piotr Marzecki, Matrell Smith	
N O V E M B E R	3	Quiz Lady	Hulu / 20th Century Studios / Gloria Sanchez Productions	Jessica Yu (director); Jen D'Angelo (screenplay); Awkwafina, Sandra Oh, Jason Schwartzman, Holland Taylor, Tony Hale, Jon "Dumbfoundead" Park, Will Ferrell	
N O V E M B E R	3	Rustin	Netflix / Higher Ground Productions	George C. Wolfe (director); Julian Breece, Dustin Lance Black (screenplay); Colman Domingo, Chris Rock, Glynn Turman, Aml Ameen, Gus Halper, CCH Pounder, Da'Vine Joy Randolph, Johnny Ramey, Michael Potts, Jeffrey Wright, Audra McDonald	
N O V E M B E R	3	The Marsh King's Daughter	Lionsgate / Roadside Attractions / STXfilms / Black Bear Pictures	Neil Burger (director); Elle Smith, Mark L. Smith (screenplay); Daisy Ridley, Ben Mendelsohn, Garrett Hedlund, Caren Pistorius, Brooklynn Prince, Gil Birmingham	
N O V E M B E R	3	What Happens Later	Bleecker Street	Meg Ryan (director/screenplay); Steven Dietz, Kirk Lynn (screenplay); Meg Ryan, David Duchovny	
N O V E M B E R	3	All Dirt Roads Taste of Salt	A24	Raven Jackson (director/screenplay); Charleen McClure, Reginald Helms Jr., Moses Ingram, Zainab Jah, Sheila Atim, Chris Chalk	
N O V E M B E R	3	Helen's Dead	Screen Media	K. Asher Levin (director/screenplay); Amy Brown Carver (screenplay); Annabelle Dexter-Jones, Tyrese Gibson, Emile Hirsch, Dylan Gelula, Oliver Cooper	
N O V E M B E R	3	At the Gates	Picturehouse	Augustus Meleo Bernstein (director/screenplay); Miranda Otto, Noah Wyle, Ezekiel Pacheco, Vanessa Benavente, Sadie Anne Stanley	
N O V E M B E R	3	Rumble Through the Dark	Lionsgate	Graham Phillips and Parker Phillips (directors); Michael Farris Smith; (screenplay); Aaron Eckhart, Bella Thorne, Ritchie Coster, Amanda Saunders, Joe Hursley, Mike McColl, Derek Russo, Christopher Winchester, Marianne Jean-Baptiste	
N O V E M B E R	3	Glisten and the Merry Mission	Samuel Goldwyn Films / Build-A-Bear Entertainment	Cory Morrison (director); Temple Mathews, Sharon Price John (screenplay); Julia Michaels, Trinity Bliss, Freddie Prinze Jr., Billy Ray Cyrus, Michael Rapaport, Dionne Warwick, Leona Lewis, Chevy Chase	
N O V E M B E R	10	The Marvels	Marvel Studios	Nia DaCosta (director/screenplay); Megan McDonnell, Elissa Karasik (screenplay); Brie Larson, Teyonah Parris, Iman Vellani, Zawe Ashton, Gary Lewis, Park Seo-joon, Zenobia Shroff, Mohan Kapur, Saagar Shaikh, Samuel L. Jackson	
N O V E M B E R	10	Dream Scenario	A24	Kristoffer Borgli (director/screenplay); Nicolas Cage, Julianne Nicholson, Michael Cera, Tim Meadows, Dylan Gelula, Dylan Baker	
N O V E M B E R	10	Journey to Bethlehem	Affirm Films	Adam Anders (director/screenplay); Peter Barsocchini (screenplay); Fiona Palomo, Milo Manheim, Lecrae, Joel Smallbone, Antonio Banderas	
N O V E M B E R	10	Your Lucky Day	Well Go USA Entertainment	Dan Brown (director/screenplay); Angus Cloud, Jessica Garza, Elliot Knight, Jason O'Mara, Sterling Beaumon, Jason Wiles, Spencer Garrett	
N O V E M B E R	10	It's a Wonderful Knife	RLJE Films / Shudder	Tyler MacIntyre (director); Michael Kennedy (screenplay); Joel McHale, Justin Long, Jane Widdop, Katharine Isabelle, Jess McLeod, Cassandra Naud	
N O V E M B E R	10	Manodrome	Lionsgate	John Trengove (director/screenplay); Jesse Eisenberg, Adrien Brody, Odessa Young, Sallieu Sesay, Philip Ettinger, Ethan Suplee, Evan Jonigkeit, Caleb Eberhardt	
N O V E M B E R	10	The Master Chief: Part One	Albea Embestro Soriano	Chris Soriano (director/screenplay); Chris Soriano, Haley Weber, Hillary Soriano, Ryan Barrier	
N O V E M B E R	16	Best. Christmas. Ever!	Netflix	Mary Lambert (director); Charles Shyer, Todd Calgi Gallicano (screenplay); Brandy Norwood, Heather Graham, Matt Cedeño, Jason Biggs	
N O V E M B E R	17	The Hunger Games: The Ballad of Songbirds & Snakes	Lionsgate / Color Force	Francis Lawrence (director); Michael Lesslie, Michael Arndt (screenplay); Tom Blyth, Rachel Zegler, Peter Dinklage, Jason Schwartzman, Hunter Schafer, Josh Andrés Rivera, Viola Davis	
N O V E M B E R	17	Trolls Band Together	Universal Pictures / DreamWorks Animation	Walt Dohrn (director); Elizabeth Tippet (screenplay); Anna Kendrick, Justin Timberlake, Kenan Thompson, Kunal Nayyar, Camila Cabello, Eric Andre, Troye Sivan, Kid Cudi, Andrew Rannells, Amy Schumer, Daveed Diggs, RuPaul, Zosia Mamet	
N O V E M B E R	17	Thanksgiving	TriStar Pictures / Spyglass Media Group	Eli Roth (director); Jeff Rendell (screenplay); Patrick Dempsey, Addison Rae, Milo Manheim, Jalen Thomas Brooks, Nell Verlaquel, Rick Hoffman, Gina Gershon	
N O V E M B E R	17	Next Goal Wins	Searchlight Pictures / The Imaginarium	Taika Waititi (director/screenplay); Iain Morris (screenplay); Michael Fassbender, Oscar Kightley, Kaimana, David Fane, Rachel House, Beulah Koale, Will Arnett, Elisabeth Moss	
N O V E M B E R	17	Saltburn	Metro-Goldwyn-Mayer / MRC / LuckyChap Entertainment	Emerald Fennell (director/screenplay); Barry Keoghan, Jacob Elordi, Rosamund Pike, Richard E. Grant, Alison Oliver, Archie Madekwe, Carey Mulligan	
N O V E M B E R	17	May December	Netflix / Gloria Sanchez Productions / Killer Films	Todd Haynes (director); Samy Burch (screenplay); Natalie Portman, Julianne Moore, Charles Melton, Cory Michael Smith	
N O V E M B E R	17	Dashing Through the Snow	Disney+ / Walt Disney Pictures / Will Packer Productions	Tim Story (director); Scott Rosenberg (screenplay); Lil Rel Howery, Ludacris, Madison Skye Validum, Teyonah Parris, Oscar Nunez	
N O V E M B E R	17	Please Don't Destroy: The Treasure of Foggy Mountain	Peacock / Universal Pictures / Apatow Productions	Paul Briganti (director); Ben Marshall, John Higgins, Martin Herlihy (screenplay); Ben Marshall, John Higgins, Martin Herlihy, Meg Stalter, X Mayo, Bowen Yang, Conan O'Brien	
N O V E M B E R	21	Leo	Netflix / Netflix Animation / Happy Madison Productions	Robert Smigel, Robert Marianetti, David Wachtenheim (directors); Adam Sandler, Bill Burr, Cecily Strong, Jason Alexander, Rob Schneider, Stephanie Hsu	
N O V E M B E R	22	Wish	Walt Disney Pictures / Walt Disney Animation Studios	Chris Buck, Fawn Veerasunthorn (directors); Jennifer Lee, Allison Moore (screenplay); Ariana DeBose, Chris Pine, Alan Tudyk, Angelique Cabral, Victor Garber, Natasha Rothwell, Jennifer Kumiyama, Harvey Guillén, Evan Peters, Ramy Youssef, Jon Rudnitsky	
N O V E M B E R	22	Napoleon	Columbia Pictures / Apple Studios / Scott Free Productions	Ridley Scott (director); David Scarpa (screenplay); Joaquin Phoenix, Vanessa Kirby, Tahar Rahim, Ben Miles, Rupert Everett	
N O V E M B E R	22	Maestro	Netflix / Sikelia Productions / Amblin Entertainment	Bradley Cooper (director/screenplay); Josh Singer (screenplay); Carey Mulligan, Bradley Cooper, Matt Bomer, Maya Hawke, Sarah Silverman	
N O V E M B E R	22	Leave the World Behind	Netflix / Higher Ground Productions	Sam Esmail (director/screenplay); Julia Roberts, Mahershala Ali, Ethan Hawke, Myha'la Herrold, Farrah Mackenzie, Charlie Evans, Kevin Bacon	
N O V E M B E R	22	Good Burger 2	Paramount+ / Nickelodeon Movies	Phil Traill (director); Kevin Kopelow, Heath Seifert, James III (screenplay); Kenan Thompson, Kel Mitchell	
N O V E M B E R	22	Genie	Peacock / Universal Pictures / Working Title Films	Sam Boyd (director); Richard Curtis (screenplay); Melissa McCarthy, Paapa Essiedu, Denée Benton, Marc Maron, Jordyn McIntosh, Luis Guzmán, Alan Cumming	
N O V E M B E R	30	Family Switch	Netflix / Wonderland Sound and Vision	McG (director); Adam Sztykiel, Victoria Strouse (screenplay); Jennifer Garner, Ed Helms, Emma Myers, Brady Noon, Rita Moreno	
D E C E M B E R	1	Renaissance: A Film by Beyoncé	AMC Entertainment / Parkwood Entertainment	Beyoncé (director); Beyoncé, Blue Ivy Carter, Megan Thee Stallion, Kendrick Lamar, Diana Ross, Jay-Z, Kelly Rowland, Michelle Williams, LaTavia Roberson, LeToya Luckett, Tina Knowles	
D E C E M B E R	1	Silent Night	Lionsgate / Thunder Road Films	John Woo (director); Robert Archer Lynn (screenplay); Joel Kinnaman, Scott Mescudi, Harold Torres, Catalina Sandino Moreno	
D E C E M B E R	1	Candy Cane Lane	Amazon Studios / Imagine Entertainment	Reginald Hudlin (director); Kelly Younger (screenplay); Eddie Murphy, Tracee Ellis Ross, Jillian Bell, Nick Offerman, Robin Thede, Chris Redd	
D E C E M B E R	1	Eileen	Neon / Film4 Productions / Likely Story	William Oldroyd (director); Ottessa Moshfegh, Luke Goebel (screenplay); Thomasin McKenzie, Shea Whigham, Marin Ireland, Owen Teague, Anne Hathaway	
D E C E M B E R	1	The Shift	Angel Studios	Brock Heasley (director/screenplay); Kristoffer Polaha, Neal McDonough, Elizabeth Tabish, Rose Reid, Sean Astin	
D E C E M B E R	1	Holiday Twist	ETM Distribution	Stephanie Garvin (director/screenplay); Kelly Stables, Neal McDonough, Sean Astin, Caylee Cowan, James Maslow, Hugh Sheridan	
D E C E M B E R	5	Abigail	Dark Star Pictures	Melissa Vitello (director); Gunnar Garrett (screenplay); Ava Cantrell, Tren Reed-Brown, Hermione Lynch, Gene Farber, Karimah Westbrook	
D E C E M B E R	7	Waitress: The Musical	Bleecker Street / Fathom Events	Brett Sullivan, Jessie Nelson (directors); Jessie Nelson (screenplay); Sara Bareilles, Drew Gehling, Charity Angél Dawson, Caitlin Houlahan, Dakin Matthews, Christpher Fitzgerald, Joe Tippett, Eric Anderson	
D E C E M B E R	8	Poor Things	Searchlight Pictures / Film4 Productions / Element Pictures	Yorgos Lanthimos (director); Tony McNamara (screenplay); Emma Stone, Mark Ruffalo, Willem Dafoe, Ramy Youssef, Christopher Abbott, Kathryn Hunter, Jerrod Carmichael, Hanna Schygulla, Margaret Qualley, Vicki Pepperdine	
D E C E M B E R	8	Origin	Neon / ARRAY Filmworks	Ava DuVernay (director/screenplay); Aunjanue Ellis-Taylor, Jon Bernthal, Vera Farmiga, Audra McDonald, Niecy Nash-Betts, Nick Offerman, Blair Underwood	
D E C E M B E R	8	Diary of a Wimpy Kid Christmas: Cabin Fever	Disney+ / Walt Disney Pictures / Bardel Entertainment	Luke Cormican (director); Jeff Kinney (screenplay); Wesley Kimmel, Spencer Howell, Hunter Dillon, Erica Cerra, Chris Diamantopoulos	
D E C E M B E R	8	Our Son	Vertical Entertainment	Bill Oliver (director/screenplay); Peter Nickowitz (screenplay); Luke Evans, Billy Porter, Christopher Woodley, Andrew Rannells, Robin Weigert, Kate Burton, Phylicia Rashad	
D E C E M B E R	8	The Cello	Destiny Media Entertainment	Darren Lynn Bousman (director); Turki Al Alshikh (screenplay); Jeremy Irons, Samer Ismail, Elham Ali, Souad Abdullah, Tobin Bell, Muhannad Al Hamdi	
D E C E M B E R	8	The Oath	Freestyle Releasing	Darin Scott (director/screenplay); Michelle Scott (screenplay); Darin Scott, Nora Dale, Karina Lombard, Eugene Brave Rock, Billy Zane, Philip Niu, Aron Stevens, Wase Chief	
D E C E M B E R	11	Craig Before the Creek	Warner Bros. Discovery Home Entertainment / Cartoon Network Studios	Matt Burnett, Ben Levin (director/screenplay); Philip Solomon, Noël Wells, H. Michael Croner, Vico Ortiz, Kimberly Hébert Gregory, Byron Marc Newsome, Phil LaMarr, Lucia Cunningham	
D E C E M B E R	15	Wonka	Warner Bros. Pictures / Village Roadshow Pictures / Heyday Films	Paul King (director/screenplay); Simon Farnaby (screenplay); Timothée Chalamet, Calah Lane, Keegan-Michael Key, Paterson Joseph, Matt Lucas, Mathew Baynton, Sally Hawkins, Rowan Atkinson, Jim Carter, Natasha Rothwell, Tom Davis, Olivia Colman, Hugh Grant	
D E C E M B E R	15	Chicken Run: Dawn of the Nugget	Netflix / Aardman Animations	Sam Fell (director); Karey Kirkpatrick, John O'Farrell, Rachel Tunnard (screenplay); Thandiwe Newton, Zachary Levi, Bella Ramsey, Imelda Staunton, Lynn Ferguson, David Bradley, Jane Horrocks, Romesh Ranganathan, Daniel Mays, Josie Sedgwick-Davies, Nick Mohammed, Miranda Richardson, Peter Serafinowicz	
D E C E M B E R	15	Rebel Moon	Netflix / The Stone Quarry	Zack Snyder (director/screenplay); Kurt Johnstad, Shay Hatten (screenplay); Sofia Boutella, Djimon Hounsou, Ed Skrein, Michiel Huisman, Bae Doona, Ray Fisher, Charlie Hunnam, Anthony Hopkins	
D E C E M B E R	15	American Fiction	Orion Pictures / MRC / T-Street Productions / 3 Arts Entertainment	Cord Jefferson (director/screenplay); Jeffrey Wright, Tracee Ellis Ross, Issa Rae, Sterling K. Brown, John Ortiz, Erika Alexander, Leslie Uggams, Adam Brody, Keith David	
D E C E M B E R	15	The Family Plan	Apple TV+ / Skydance Media	Simon Cellan Jones (director); David Coggeshall (screenplay); Mark Wahlberg, Michelle Monaghan, Saïd Taghmaoui, Maggie Q, Zoe Colletti, Van Crosby, Ciarán Hinds	
D E C E M B E R	15	Finestkind	Paramount+ / MTV Entertainment Studios	Brian Helgeland (director/screenplay); Ben Foster, Toby Wallace, Jenna Ortega, Tommy Lee Jones	
D E C E M B E R	15	The Zone of Interest	A24 / Film4 Productions	Jonathan Glazer (director/screenplay); Christian Friedel, Sandra Hüller	
D E C E M B E R	19	City of Love	Rotten Apple Entertainment / Freestyle Digital Media	Èric Boadella (director/screenplay); Sara Pattarini (screenplay); Robert DeCesare, Kathryn Schott, Taylor Nichols, Mario Tardón, Myron Donley	
D E C E M B E R	22	Aquaman and the Lost Kingdom	Warner Bros. Pictures / DC Studios / Atomic Monster	James Wan (director); David Leslie Johnson-McGoldrick (screenplay); Jason Momoa, Patrick Wilson, Amber Heard, Yahya Abdul-Mateen II, Dolph Lundgren, Randall Park, Temuera Morrison, Nicole Kidman	
D E C E M B E R	22	Migration	Universal Pictures / Illumination	Benjamin Renner (director); Mike White (screenplay); Kumail Nanjiani, Elizabeth Banks, Awkwafina, Keegan-Michael Key, Carol Kane, David Mitchell, Isabela Merced, Caspar Jennings, Tresi Gazal, Danny DeVito	
D E C E M B E R	22	Anyone but You	Columbia Pictures / Roth/Kirschenbaum Films / SK Global	Will Gluck (director/screenplay); Ilana Wolpert (screenplay); Sydney Sweeney, Glen Powell, Alexandra Shipp, GaTa, Hadley Robinson, Michelle Hurd, Dermot Mulroney, Darren Barnet, Rachel Griffiths, Bryan Brown	
D E C E M B E R	22	The Iron Claw	A24 / BBC Film	Sean Durkin (director/screenplay); Zac Efron, Jeremy Allen White, Harris Dickinson, Maura Tierney, Stanley Simons, Lily James, Holt McCallany	
D E C E M B E R	22	Freud's Last Session	Sony Pictures Classics / Screen Ireland	Matthew Brown (director/screenplay); Mark St. Germain (screenplay); Anthony Hopkins, Matthew Goode, Liv Lisa Fries, Jodi Balfour, Jeremy Northam, Orla Brady	
D E C E M B E R	22	Memory	Ketchup Entertainment / Mubi	Michel Franco (director/screenplay); Jessica Chastain, Peter Sarsgaard, Merritt Wever, Brooke Timber, Elsie Fisher, Josh Charles, Jessica Harper	
D E C E M B E R	25	The Color Purple	Warner Bros. Pictures / Amblin Entertainment / OW Films	Blitz Bazawule (director), Marcus Gardley (screenplay); Fantasia Barrino, Taraji P. Henson, Danielle Brooks, Colman Domingo, Corey Hawkins, H.E.R., Halle Bailey, Louis Gossett Jr., Phylicia Pearl Mpasi, Ciara, Jon Batiste, Aunjanue Ellis-Taylor	
D E C E M B E R	25	The Boys in the Boat	Metro-Goldwyn-Mayer / Smokehouse Pictures	George Clooney (director), Mark L. Smith (screenplay); Callum Turner, Joel Edgerton, Peter Guinness	
D E C E M B E R	25	Ferrari	Neon / STXfilms / Ketchup Entertainment	Michael Mann (director), Troy Kennedy Martin (screenplay); Adam Driver, Penelope Cruz, Shailene Woodley, Sarah Gadon, Gabriel Leone, Jack O'Connell, Patrick Dempsey	
D E C E M B E R	29	Good Grief	Netflix	Dan Levy (director/screenplay); Dan Levy, Ruth Negga, Himesh Patel, Celia Imrie, David Bradley, Arnaud Valois, Luke Evans	

== See also ==
- List of 2023 box office number-one films in the United States
- 2023 in film
- 2023 in the United States
