= Deadly Revisions =

- Film poster
- Directed by: Gregory Blair
- Written by: Gregory Blair
- Starring: Bill Oberst Jr., Mikhail Blokh, Cindy Merrill
- Cinematography: Kate Sobol
- Edited by: Barry Bond
- Music by: Andrew Poole Todd
- Production companies: Good Kids Productions, PIX/SEE Productions
- Release date: January 2013 (Los Angeles)
- Running time: 95 minutes
- Country: United States
- Language: English

Deadly Revisions is a 2013 horror thriller that was written and directed by Gregory Blair and is his directorial debut. The film stars Bill Oberst Jr. as a horror writer and filmmaker trying to figure out what caused a gap in his memory and why.

== Synopsis ==
When horror writer and filmmaker Grafton Torn (Bill Oberst Jr.) wakes from a coma, he's horrified to find that he can't remember the events that led to his coma and leg injury. His physician has recommended that Grafton try to recover his memories by using hypnotherapy and medication while resting at a cabin in a peaceful location. Grafton agrees to this, but he finds that he's plagued by nightmares that involves not only the characters of his own creation but also potentially real memories. Things are made worse when these nightmares begin to spill over into his waking life, making Grafton question his very sanity.

== Cast ==
- Bill Oberst Jr. as Grafton Torn
- Mikhail Blokh as Deter McMannus
- Cindy Merrill as Ally Morris
- Lise Hart as Kat Torn
- Gregory Blair as Crawford Davis
- Ronny Coleman as Doctor Myers
- Shaun Gerardo as Ash
- Dawna Lee Heising as Nurse Voorhees
- Josh Patterson as Noose Man / Hatchet Man

== Production ==
Plans to film Deadly Revisions were first announced in spring 2012. Initially titled Scare Tactics, the movie was intended to enter pre-production in 2012 and release the following year. The film's title was changed soon after the initial announcement, as the director wanted a title that reflected more upon the film's subject matter and could be seen as more "fresh". Filming took place in Los Angeles.

== Reception ==
Horror Society said: "[Blair] has a flair for direction… "Deadly Revisions" is a well-made, tension filled thrill ride..." Dread Central said: "director Gregory Blair gives thinking-man’s thriller fans something to chew on." L.A. Horror.com declared the film "a freaky new thriller that will no doubt be a delight to the true horror viewer." Ain't It Cool News gave an overall favorable review for Deadly Revisions, praising Oberst's performance as Grafton Torn".

=== Awards ===
- Best Picture (Deadly Revisions) - Matchflick.com Flicker Awards
- Best Narrative Feature (Deadly Revisions) - Los Angeles Film Awards
- Best Director of an Indie Horror Film (Deadly Revisions) - EOTM Awards
- Best Screenplay (Deadly Revisions) - Terror Film Festival
- Best Actor Bill Oberst Jr. - Fantastic Horror Film Festival
- Best Actress Cindy Merrill - Fantastic Horror Film Festival
