= Virtuality (film) =

- Cast
- Genre: Science fiction; Drama
- Teleplay by: Michael Taylor
- Story by: Michael Taylor; Ronald D. Moore
- Directed by: Peter Berg
- Starring: Nikolaj Coster-Waldau; Kerry Bishé; Joy Bryant; Jose Pablo Cantillo; Ritchie Coster; James D'Arcy; Clea DuVall; Kari Wahlgren; Gene Farber; Sienna Guillory; Erik Jensen; Nelson Lee; Omar Metwally; Jimmi Simpson
- Music by: Wendy Melvoin; Lisa Coleman
- Country of origin: United States
- Original language: English

Production
- Executive producers: Ronald D. Moore; Gail Berman; Lloyd Braun; Peter Berg; Sarah Aubrey; Michael Taylor
- Producer: Steve Oster
- Production location: Vancouver
- Cinematography: Stephen McNutt
- Editors: Colby Parker Jr.; Mike O'Halloran
- Running time: 88 minutes
- Production companies: Look Ma! No Hands Productions; Tall Ship Productions; BermanBraun; Film44; Universal Media Studios

Original release
- Network: Fox
- Release: June 26, 2009

Virtuality is a 2009 American science fiction drama television film directed by Peter Berg and written by Michael Taylor and Ronald D. Moore. Originally filmed for the Fox network as a television pilot for a series that was not commissioned, it aired on the network as a standalone film on June 26, 2009. It features the crew of Phaeton, a spaceship designed to search for a hospitable planet in a nearby star system after an ecological catastrophe in near-future Earth. While approaching the point of no return, the crew experiences problems with their virtual reality entertainment system, which quickly escalate and threaten their mission.

== Plot ==
The story is set aboard the Phaeton, Earth's first starship, on a ten-year journey to explore the nearby Epsilon Eridani star system. In order to help the 12-person crew endure the long mission, a system of virtual reality modules are installed aboard the ship. These modules, which are worn like glasses and suppress real-world body movement, allow the crew to assume various identities and enjoy a variety of adventures. The crew's experiences aboard the ship are broadcast back to Earth as Fox's reality television program Edge of Never: Life on the Phaeton.

The pilot picks up approximately six months after the launch of Phaeton. The crew now faces a "go or no-go" situation, in that they are fast approaching their last chance to change course back towards Earth. However, their home planet is quickly becoming uninhabitable, with dry land becoming increasingly rare. Scientists estimate that the planet will become completely inhospitable within the next hundred years. The Phaeton's priority mission has been changed to that of searching out and discovering a new planet for humans to inhabit.

Unfortunately, as the crew fast approaches their point of no return beyond the planet Neptune, several problems arise. Dr. Adin Meyer, the crew's only physician, becomes aware that he is in the early stages of Parkinson's disease. Via use of the Phaeton's virtual reality programs, Commander Frank Pike has begun a secret sexual relationship with botanist Rika Goddard, whose husband, psychologist Dr. Roger Fallon, is also a part of the crew, the mission psychologist and producer of Edge of Never.

Meanwhile, the crew's virtual reality simulators have been experiencing several bizarre glitches, all of which involve a mysterious man, whose acts against the crew inside the virtual simulations become more and more disturbing, including "murdering" Pike during an American Civil War reenactment and "killing" Meyer by pushing him off a cliff. Despite the hardships, the crew unanimously decides to continue on with the 10-year voyage.

After Billie Kashmiri, the new host of Edge of Never, is beaten and raped by the mystery man within the virtual world, the crew considers discontinuing use of the virtual reality programs, possibly for the remainder of the voyage. Now past their "point of no return", the crew faces the prospect of continuing on for an entire decade within the confines of the Phaeton without a virtual world for comfort.

The communications array fails to deploy, and after Dr. Jules Braun (designer of most of the Phaeton's systems) tries everything that he can from inside the ship, Pike, Rika, Val Orlovsky and Manny Rodriguez prepare to identify the problem from the outside. However, while preparing for EVA, the airlock chamber closes by itself, with Pike inside and without his pressure suit helmet. Despite efforts to save him, the airlock opens and Pike is killed. His death leaves the crew in shambles. Braun, however, believes Pike's death was murder, and does not know whom to trust. The Phaeton's drive engineer and second in command, Dr. Jimmy Johnson, unwillingly assumes command, foreseeing conflict with the crew as he is a somewhat abrasive loner. While going over the ship's recording of Pike's death, Fallon discovers Pike's last confession of love to Rika.

Rika finds Pike's virtual reality headset in her quarters, and when she wears it, she finds herself in Pike's favorite simulation: a tactical military command of the Civil War era. Inside the simulation, she encounters what appears to be a simulation of Pike that tells her, "None of this is real," and only by following him "through the looking-glass and down the rabbit hole" will she learn the truth. He rides off on horseback into the virtual sunset, with Rika crying out Pike's name in desperation.

== Cast and characters ==
- Nikolaj Coster-Waldau as Commander Frank Pike
- Kerry Bishé as Billie Kashmiri – computer scientist, reality show host
- Joy Bryant as Alice Thibadeau – astrobiologist
- Jose Pablo Cantillo as Manny Rodriguez – astrophysicist
- Ritchie Coster as Dr. Jimmy Johnson – pulse drive engineer, second-in-command
- James D'Arcy as Dr. Roger Fallon – psych officer, reality show producer
- Clea DuVall as Sue Parsons – pilot, flight systems engineer
- Gene Farber as Val Orlovsky – geologist
- Sienna Guillory as Rika Goddard – botanist, microbial exobiologist
- Erik Jensen as Dr. Jules Braun – navigator, Phaeton designer
- Nelson Lee as Kenji Yamamoto – astrobiologist
- Omar Metwally as Dr. Adin Meyer – medical officer
- Jimmi Simpson as Virtual Man
- Kari Wahlgren as Jean (voice) – onboard computer

== Production ==
The screenwriters consulted NASA to accurately display space travel technology. After seeing the scheduled airing time of Virtuality, Michael Taylor called it a "New Orleans funeral", having little hope in Fox picking up the series.

The closing credits honor Nora O'Brien, an NBC Universal executive, who died in May 2009 of a cerebral aneurysm at the age of 44.

== TV series campaign ==
Virtuality was filmed as a pilot but aired as a film when Fox did not pick up the series. On Friday June 26, 2009 Jessica Blank, wife of actor Erik Jensen who portrayed Dr. Jules Braun, posted a call to action on her husband's Facebook page urging people to watch the movie and write in support of more episodes.

== DVD release ==
Virtuality was first released on DVD on October 27, 2009, in the United States, exclusively through Best Buy. The DVD then had a full release on May 4, 2010.
