= Red Light Teachers =

2026 American independent drama film

- Directed by: Chris Soriano
- Written by: Chris Soriano
- Produced by: Ken Gora; Hillary Soriano
- Starring: Drea Castro; Chris Soriano; Hillary Soriano; Sarah Channel; Rhandy Torres; Derrick Acosta
- Release dates: January 23, 2026 (United States, limited)
- Country: United States
- Language: English

Red Light Teachers is a 2026 American independent drama film written and directed by Chris Soriano. The film stars Soriano, Drea Castro, Hillary Soriano, and Sarah Channel. It premiered during the 2025 San Diego Film Week and received a limited theatrical release in select Regal Theatres on January 23, 2026.

== Premise ==
An immigrant is forced into the world of strip clubs and crosses paths with a disillusioned drama teacher, confronting struggles and second chances.

== Cast ==
- Drea Castro as Maria
- Chris Soriano as Jeremy Baylon
- Hillary Soriano as Lizel
- Sarah Channel as Jessi
- Rhandy Torres as Uncle Tony
- Derrick Acosta as Krish
- Evan Nejad as Nathan
- Victoria Pagnini as Ms. Young
- Johnny La as John
- Bruce Hutcherson as Principal Labrador
- Ryan Barrier as Johnny

== Production ==
Red Light Teachers was created by a filmmaking duo drawing inspiration from Filipino immigrant experiences. The film was shot on location in San Diego.

== Release ==
The film premiered at the 2025 San Diego Film Week, where it was featured as part of the festival's lineup. It later opened in a limited nationwide run at select Regal Theatres on January 23, 2026.
