= Ava Cantrell =

American actress and dancer

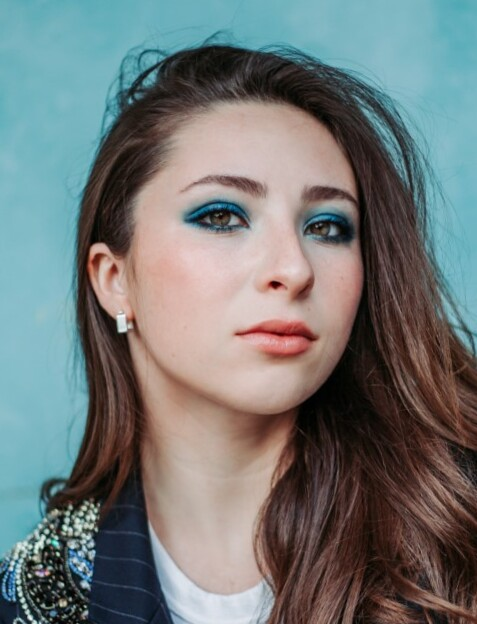
- Cantrell in 2022
- Born: 2000 or 2001 (age 24–25)
- Occupations: Actress; dancer
- Years active: 2008–present
- Known for: Abigail; Lights Out
- Awards: Best Performance in a TV Series – Guest Starring Young Actress 11–13 at the 35th Young Artist Awards

Ava Cantrell is an American actress and dancer who starred in the film Abigail and appeared in Lights Out and the Nickelodeon series The Haunted Hathaways.

== Life and career ==
Cantrell competed as a dancer between 2007 and 2014 in the styles of ballet, tap, contemporary, and musical theater. She won Best Performance in a TV Series – Guest Starring Young Actress 11–13 at the 35th Young Artist Awards in 2014 for her role in The Haunted Hathaways. Cantrell was cast as Brooklyn in the 2015 web-series Cam Girls. In 2016, she was cast as Teen Diana in the film Lights Out and starred in the film One Under the Sun alongside Pooja Batra and Gene Farber. In 2023, Cantrell starred as the titular character Abigail Cole in the horror film Abigail.

== Filmography ==
Film
Year	Title	Role	Notes
2010	Pals	Ally	Short film
2012	Cupcake	Eva	Short film
2012	Expo	Darla	Short film
2012	I Will Love	Emma	
2013	Ten Thousand Hours	Sam	Short film
2014	Exit 13	Alice	
2014	The Passing	Rachel	Short film
2014	Above the 101	Gabi	Short film
2016	Lights Out	Teen Diana Walter	
2017	One Under the Sun	Amelia Voss	
2019	The Detention Boyz	Grapefruit	Short film
2022	22	Natalie	Short film
2023	Abigail	Abigail Cole	

Television
Year	Title	Role	Notes
2013–15	The Haunted Hathaways	Penelope	4 episodes
2015	Not Safe for Work	Sunny Scout	NBC Pilot
2015	Cam Girls: The Series	Brooklyn	2 episodes
2018	Young Sheldon	Molly	2 episode
