= Almighty Zeus =

2022 film by Chris Soriano

- Poster
- Directed by: Chris Soriano
- Written by: Chris Soriano
- Produced by: Julian Brantley; Luis Jorge Rios
- Starring: Chris Soriano; Michael D'Aguilar; Peter Laboy; Ari Huber; Kimberly Ransom; Miguel Matos; Tenzin Dhondup; Aryana Hamzehloo
- Cinematography: Nathaniel Regier
- Edited by: Julian Brantley; Max Hoffmann
- Distributed by: TriCoast Worldwide
- Release date: December 2, 2022 (Limited)
- Running time: 115 minutes
- Country: United States
- Language: English

Almighty Zeus is a 2022 action film written and directed by Chris Soriano. The film stars Soriano, Michael D'Aguilar, Peter Laboy and Ari Huber.

== Plot ==
A young boxer saves an elderly person from being attacked and goes viral as a result.

== Cast ==
- Chris Soriano
- Michael D'Aguilar
- Peter Laboy
- Ari Huber
- Kimberly Ransom
- Miguel Matos
- Tenzin Dhondup
- Aryana Hamzehloo

== Production ==
Soriano is the film's director, writer and star. The film was inspired by anti-Asian hate crimes. Manny Pacquiao is an executive producer on the film. Soriano said Pacquiao's involvement became a reality after he contacted him on Instagram. Principal photography took place during the COVID-19 pandemic in San Diego. The entire film was completed in 90 days.

== Release ==
The film had a limited theatrical release on December 2, 2022 and was distributed by TriCoast Worldwide.
