= Craving (2023 film) =

2023 horror film by J. Horton

- Release poster
- Directed by: J. Horton
- Written by: J. Horton; Gregory Blair
- Produced by: J. Horton; Kevin Caliber; Ashley Undercuffler; Robert Bravo; Sean Reid
- Starring: Rachel Amanda Bryant; Al Gomez; Gregory Blair; Ashley Undercuffler; Kevin Caliber; Holly Rockwell; Xavier Roe; Sage Mayer; Felissa Rose
- Cinematography: Sophia Cacciola
- Edited by: J. Horton
- Music by: Everett Young
- Production companies: ZapruderFlix; World One TV; 50 Caliber Productions; Sky Island Storytelling
- Distributed by: Indie Rights
- Release date: March 8, 2023
- Running time: 83 minutes
- Country: United States
- Language: English
- Budget: $100,000

Craving is a 2023 American horror film directed by J. Horton and starring Rachel Amanda Bryant, Al Gomez, Gregory Blair, Ashley Undercuffler, Kevin Caliber, Holly Rockwell, Xavier Roe, and Felissa Rose. It was released in March 2023 by Indie Rights.

The film follows heroin addicts who barricade themselves in a country bar after a drug deal goes wrong. As they suffer from withdrawal symptoms and face a siege from outside, they also have to deal with a mysterious threat inside the bar that could destroy them all. Much of the story is told via flashbacks that explain how the various characters arrived at the present standoff.

The film was produced by Kevin Caliber, Ashley Undercuffler, Robert Bravo, and Sean Reid via ZapruderFlix, World One TV, 50 Caliber Productions, and Sky Island Storytelling

== Plot ==
Police officers Shaw and Washington enter a rural bar, The Last Exit, following what appears to be a bloody massacre. They find one female survivor, Shiloh, too scared to speak to them.

Flashing back to the night before, The Last Exit is having a typical evening. Les, the owner and bartender, contends with Rudy, a conspiracy theorist who lusts over Shiloh, the other bartender. Travis, a cowboy and swindler, challenges Rudy to a game of pool but is distracted by local DJ Rylee, who rebuffs his advances. A suspicious man in the corner named Jared watches over the bar before Cece enters. Cece asks to borrow Travis' car, which he is opposed to as Cece is with another man, Frank. Travis relents and Cece does drugs in the bathroom, unaware that John is in one of the stalls. The patrons are startled by the sound of gunshots outside. Les takes a baseball bat to scare of what she assumes are kids with firecrackers, but is shot in the head by the crossfire.

Five violent heroin addicts force their way into the bar: Gail, Mac, Will, Lo, and Frenzy. After they assume control of the bar it becomes apparent that a second group outside is after them. This group wears flesh masks and violently murders Frank after pulling him out of his car. The lieutenant of the group, Red, uses a megaphone to coerce the people inside to give up one of their own, who they deem is a monster, before his group begins barricading the bar. Inside, Shiloh weeps over Les' body, and Gail forces her and the patrons to stand together by the pool table while Mac checks the bar for other entrances. John successfully hides under the bathroom sink. At the bar, Gail watches the group outside over the CCTV, recognizing their leader as Hunter, who removes his mask and taunts the group inside. Will is suffering from withdrawals, worse than any of the others, and he rests behind the bar. The addicts struggle to maintain control over the patrons, leading to Frenzy assaulting Travis and Rudy. Cece plots to turn the addicts against each other, but Frenzy catches on and beats her up in the bathroom.

Through flashbacks it's revealed that a man named Carl rescued Gail from a drug den, and she became the adoptive mother to his adoptive son, Will, who suffered a condition that only heroin would remedy. Mac serves as Carl's number two, and only very recently did the group meet Frenzy and Lo, who are a couple. Lo calms Frenzy's hot demeanor, though Lo herself is deeply disturbed and admits to having murdered animals in her youth. It's revealed that Carl was dating Hunter's ex-wife, and that Hunter is Will's real father. A monster murdered Hunter's ex-wife, leading him down a rabbit hole chasing clue after clue, trying to find this creature. Eventually Hunter discovered what Carl was up to, and after making arrangements with Red's people and secretly colluding with Frenzy to trap Carl's group at The Last Exit, Hunter shot and killed Carl immediately preceding the events of the story.

Inside the bar, tensions between the group escalate. Cece accidentally gets Frenzy to reveal her betrayal to Gail, giving Cece the opportunity to steal Gail's revolver. As Cece attempts to take control of the situation, Lo sneaks up behind her and beats her to death with a pool cue. Exposed, Frenzy and Lo attempt to kill Mac, but Frenzy accidentally shoots Lo. Will is shot in the crossfire, and Gail comforts him until his passes away. Suddenly, Will's body begins to twist and contort, terrifying the patrons of the bar. It is clear that Will is the monster, leading Frenzy and Rylee to attempt to escape. Will fully transforms into a large, slimy creature covered in bodily spikes and sharp teeth protruding from his face. Will immediately rips apart Frenzy before turning on the patrons, killing Jared, Travis, and Rylee. Shiloh tries to hide under a pool table, and Rudy sacrifices himself to save her. Gail attempts to calm Will, hoping underneath the monster that he's still there. Her words fail, and Mac attempts to kill Will before being torn apart himself. The last one standing, Gail succumbs to her death at Will's monstrous hands.

Will finds John hiding in the bathroom and tears him apart before returning to the pool table where Shiloh is hiding. He scratches her arm in an attempt to reach her, but after consuming so much he's become weakened, and Shiloh impales him with the broken pool cue. Will transforms back to normal, apologizing to Shiloh. Before he dies he tells her he became the monster after he was scratched by one. Outside Red sends in Lori and Gerry to investigate the bar. Shiloh stabs Gerry but Lori shoots her. As Lori looms over Shiloh, her eyes transform and she kills Lori. Outside, Hunter and Red are shocked as they see Shiloh, now in monster form, break through the barricades and murder Red and the rest of his group.

== Cast ==
- Felissa Rose as Les
- Al Gomez as Hunter
- Holly Rockwell as Gail
- Kevin Caliber as Mac
- Ashley Undercuffler as Frenzy
- Xavier Roe as Will
- Likun Jing as Lo
- Rachel Amanda Bryant as Shiloh
- Toya Morman as CeCe
- Gregory Blair as Travis
- Frankie Guzman as Rudy
- Miranda Bourke as Rylee
- Scott Alan Ward as Jared Scott
- Greg Tally as Red
- Zera Lynd as Lori
- Robert C. Pullman as Gerry
- Kelsie Mathews as Simone
- Michael Turner Tucker as Carl
- Matt Weinglass as Kent
- Kim Estes as Officer Shaw
- Thomas Haley as Officer Washington
- Brook Hubbs as Frank
- Joseph D. Webb as John
- Jake Butcher as Paul
- Sage Mayer as Young Will

== Production ==
The film raised over $63,000 on Indiegogo. The first version of the script was written in 2010 and the film went into production in 2022.

The special effects and creature design were done by Robert Bravo of Bravo FX.

Actors Al Gomez, Holly Rockwell, Michael Turner Tucker, and Kevin Caliber were de-aged with visual effects by Brook Hubbs for the flashbacks throughout the film.

== Release ==
Craving was released on March 9, 2023, by Indie Rights.

== Reception ==
On the review aggregator website Rotten Tomatoes, 80% of 5 critics' reviews are positive.

The film received mostly positive reviews from critics and horror fans, who praised its special effects, creature design, look and cinematography, editing, and cast performances. Some reviewers also noted the film's playful depravity that added to its charm. While most reviews were positive, some reviewers were critical of the plot complexity and the number of characters.
