= Abigail (2023 film) =

2023 film by Melissa Vitello

- Official release poster
- Directed by: Melissa Vitello
- Written by: Gunnar Garrett
- Produced by: Stacy Snyder; Melissa Vitello
- Starring: Ava Cantrell; Tren Reed-Brown; Hermione Lynch; Gene Farber; Karimah Westbrook; Yanni Walker; Trace Talbot; Meredith Vivian; Patrick Hilgart; Conner Stiles; Rob Gore
- Cinematography: Bryan Ricke
- Edited by: Michael S. Ojeda
- Music by: Adele Etheridge Woodson
- Production companies: Dark Gravity Studios; Mooncastle Films; Ranch Hand Films
- Distributed by: Dark Star Pictures
- Release date: December 5, 2023 (VOD)
- Country: United States
- Language: English

Abigail is a 2023 horror thriller film directed by Melissa Vitello and written by Gunnar Garrett. The film stars Ava Cantrell, Tren Reed-Brown, Hermione Lynch, Gene Farber and Karimah Westbrook.

== Plot ==
A problematic teenager makes friends with her tormented neighbor in 1976, but her obsession turns deadly when she seeks revenge on those who did him wrong.

== Cast ==
- Ava Cantrell as Abigail Cole
- Tren Reed-Brown as Lucas Wright
- Hermione Lynch as Eve
- Gene Farber as Eddie
- Karimah Westbrook as Donna
- Yanni Walker as Deputy Morgan
- Trace Talbot as Daniel
- Meredith Vivian as Victoria
- Patrick Hilgart as Micah
- Conner Stiles as Ben
- Rob Gore as Sheriff Moxey
- Jodie Garrett as Mrs. Thompson
- Gunnar Garrett as Mr. Stetson
- Elizabeth Mae Alan as Store Clerk
- Ernesto Chaverri as Highway Patrol Officer
- Will McCarns as EMT Garrett
- Michelle Madison as TV Newscaster / Police Dispatcher

== Production ==
The film was produced by Dark Gravity Studios.

== Release ==
The film was released on video on demand on December 5, 2023, and was distributed by Dark Star Pictures.

== Reception ==
Albert Valentin at Wold Film Geek scored the film an A−. Loron Hays at Reel Reviews scored it 4 out of 5 and said it was "certainly on-point with its take on the slasher genre." Jim Morazzini at Nerdly gave it a 2.5 out of 5 claiming it was not "particularly memorable or exciting."
