= Chris Soriano =

American actor and filmmaker

- Born: Naval Medical Center San Diego, San Diego, California, United States
- Occupations: Actor; filmmaker
- Notable work: Almighty Zeus; The Master Chief: Part One; The Wedding Hustler
- Spouse: Hillary Manalac (m. 2022)

Chris Soriano is an American actor and filmmaker who wrote, directed, and starred in the films Almighty Zeus (2022), The Wedding Hustler (2023), and The Master Chief: Part One (2023).

== Personal life ==
Born to Filipino parents at Naval Medical Center San Diego, and raised in Paradise Hills, San Diego, his films have been noted for addressing issues faced by Asian Americans.

== Filmography ==
Year	Title	Actor	Director	Writer	Producer	Role	Notes
2020	Dynasty Boys	—N/a	Yes	—N/a	—N/a		
2022	Almighty Zeus	Yes	Yes	Yes	No	Zeus Ortega	
2023	The Wedding Hustler	Yes	Yes	Yes	Executive	Chris Soriano	
2023	The Master Chief: Part One	Yes	Yes	Yes	No	Gabe Rosario	
2025	Authentic or Not: The Filipino Food Revolution	Yes	Yes	Yes	Yes	Kris	
2026	Red Light Teachers	Yes	Yes	Yes	No	Jeremy Baylon	
TBA	The Ender Home	Yes	No	No	No		Directed by Jordan Jacobo
TBA	The Master Chief: Subic Bay	Yes	Yes	—N/a	—N/a	Gabe Rosario	
