= The Master Chief: Part One =

- Official poster
- Directed by: Chris Soriano
- Written by: Chris Soriano
- Produced by: Bryan W. Anderson; Mark De Leon; Ken Gora; Olivia Lyle; Vincent Manalac; Kevin Morris; Evan Nejad; Jamuelle Zumel
- Starring: Chris Soriano; Jonel Awit; Ryan Barrier; Dan Hwang; Dillon Kivo; Peter Laboy; Christina Ledo; Mikaylee Mina
- Cinematography: Garrett Gaston
- Edited by: Mark De Leon
- Production company: Albea Embestro Soriano
- Release dates: November 10, 2023 (Theatrical); February 23, 2024 (VOD)
- Country: United States

The Master Chief: Part One is a 2023 American drama film written and directed by Chris Soriano. The film stars Soriano, Haley Weber and Ryan Barrier.

== Plot ==
Racial tension aboard a ship becomes a reality for a Filipino sailor.

== Cast ==
- Chris Soriano as Gabe Rosario
- Princeton Egbe as Tate
- Jon Awit
- Ryan Barrier as Captain ONeill
- Ina Dahilig as Gabe's Mom
- Wyll Dickenson as Executive Officer Canson
- Dan Hwang as Caleb
- Kat Kendria as Waitress
- Dillon Kivo as Petty Officer of the Watch (POOW)
- Peter Laboy
- Christina Ledo as Ops O Young
- Mikaylee Mina as Kate ONeill
- Warren Mitchell as Gibbs
- Rob Moore as Tony Bancroft
- Kody Seewald as Lieutenant Smith
- James Shelledy as CPO Morales
- Hillary Soriano
- Kyle Blaine Tiglao as CPO Arcilla
- Georgina Tolentino
- Rhandy Torres as Master Chief Tabalon
- Haley Weber as Mikayla
- Jamuelle Zumel as Romi

== Production ==
The film was shot aboard Naval ships in San Diego, California with a local cast and crew. The story is based on the experiences and hardships Soriano's father faced during his time in the United States Navy.

== Release ==
The film was released in theaters on November 10, 2023 and video on demand in February 2024.

== Sequel ==
In August 2024, a sequel titled The Master Chief: Subic Bay was scheduled to begin production with actress Heart Evangelista.
