= The Wedding Hustler =

2023 film by Chris Soriano

- Poster
- Directed by: Chris Soriano
- Written by: Chris Soriano
- Produced by: Julian Brantley; Kevin Morris
- Starring: Chris Soriano; Christine S. Chang; Hillary Soriano; Heart Evangelista; Kane Lim
- Cinematography: Tim Banks
- Edited by: Julian Brantley; Zachary Colton
- Production company: Matthew 25:14
- Distributed by: 1091 Pictures
- Release date: February 7, 2023 (VOD)
- Running time: 94 minutes
- Country: United States
- Language: English

The Wedding Hustler is a 2023 American romantic comedy film written and directed by Chris Soriano. The film stars Soriano, Christine S. Chang, Hillary Soriano, Heart Evangelista and Kane Lim.

== Plot ==
A wedding hustler helps a bride and groom throw a surprise wedding.

== Cast ==
- Chris Soriano as Chris
- Christine S. Chang as The Wedding Planner
- Hillary Soriano as Hillary
- Heart Evangelista as Heart
- Kane Lim as Cam

== Production ==
Principal photography happened in locations around San Diego, California including National City, Mission Valley and Pechanga Resort & Casino. It is based on the Sorianos' own surprise wedding during the COVID-19 pandemic, which took place on the first day of production. Before she was cast, Chang was a real-life wedding planner in Southern California. Heart Evangelista and Kane Lim, were also cast who previously worked together on the reality TV show Bling Empire.

== Release ==
The film was distributed by 1091 Pictures and was released on video on demand on February 7, 2023.
