= Shaun Gerardo =

American actor

- Born: Shaun Joseph Gerardo; Phoenix, Arizona, US
- Occupations: 2006-2026 Basketball Coach, Personal Trainer + Performance Specialist. 2013-2020 Actor, Producer.
- Years active: 2006
- Website: www.coachshaunbasketball.com

Shaun Joseph Gerardo (born September 22, 1984) is an American basketball development and performance specialist and former film, stage and television actor. Gerardo later transitioned into basketball coaching, specializing in youth basketball training and player development.

== Basketball Career ==
Gerardo works primarily as a private basketball trainer in the Los Angeles area. His training has focused on shooting mechanics, ball handling, footwork, finishing, strength and conditioning, and player development.

Gerardo's approach combines basketball skills training with physical preparation and mental performance. He has described basketball as an important outlet in his early life and has emphasized mental toughness and resilience in his coaching. In 2026, Gerardo appeared on the Untapped Stories podcast, where he discussed shooting and ball-handling development, mental toughness, and his approach to coaching young athletes.

Gerardo has also discussed an approach he calls "encouraging pressure", emphasizing structured challenges and cooperation between coaches and parents in youth athlete development.

In 2025, Gerardo was named Coach of the Year by Athletes Untapped.

== Acting Career: Stage work ==
Shaun hit the stage early in life. At the age of twelve he played Gilligan in Gilligan's Island. At the age of 22, he wrote, directed and starred in a play titled The Vision of a Woman. This play was put on by the Scottsdale Center for the Arts, and it received heavy praise for its ability to bring social issues regarding women to the forefront. In 2011, Patch Media reviewed Shaun's work in One Night Stands, a play by Paul Storiale: "Shaun Gerardo, holds his own and shows vulnerability, strength, sincerity and realism few Oscar-winning actors display".
