= Gene Farber =

Belarusian-born American actor

- Born: November 14, 1978 (age 47); Minsk, Byelorussian SSR, Soviet Union
- Education: Boston University
- Occupation: Actor
- Years active: 2004 – present

Gene Farber (born November 14, 1978, in Minsk, Belarus) is an American actor of Belarusian-Jewish descent.

== Filmography ==
=== Films ===
- Virtuality (2010)
- Das Boot (2010)
- X-Men: First Class (2011) - Soviet Radioman
- Idiot (2012)
- The Body Tree (2015)
- Captain America: Civil War (2016) - Vasily Karpov
- One Under the Sun (2017)
- Abigail (2023)

=== TV series ===
- Person of Interest (episode "Provenance")
- Vegas (episode "Two of Kind")
- CSI: NY (episode "Brooklyn Til I Die")
- Law & Order: Los Angeles (episode "Plummer Park")
- Undercovers
- The Whole Truth (episode "Thicker Than Water")
- In Plain Sight (episode "Coma Chameleon")
- 24 (4 episodes)
- CSI: Crime Scene Investigation (episode "Sin City Blue")
- Lie to Me (episode "Fold Equity")
- The Mentalist (episode "Bloodshot")
- Numb3rs (episode "Sneakerhead")
- Law & Order (2 episodes)
- Law & Order: Criminal Intent (episode "Shrink-Wrapped")
- Elementary (episode "Under My Skin")
- Perception (episode "Meat")
- NCIS: Los Angeles (episode "No More Secrets")
- What If...? - (2 episodes) Vasily Karpov

=== Video games ===
- Command & Conquer: Red Alert 3 (2008)
- Command & Conquer: Red Alert 3 - Uprising (2009)
- Call of Duty: Black Ops - Grigori Weaver (2010, voice)
- Ace Combat: Assault Horizon (2011, voice)
- Tom Clancy's Ghost Recon: Future Soldier - Staff Sergeant Kozak (2012, voice)
- Medal of Honor: Warfighter (2012, voice)
- Killzone: Shadow Fall - Sgt. Lucas Kellan (2013, voice)
- The Amazing Spider-Man 2 (2014, voice)
- Tom Clancy's Ghost Recon: Wildlands - Staff Sergeant Kozak (Reprised)(2017, voice)
- Call of Duty: Modern Warfare - Sgt. Kamarov (2019, voice)
- Call of Duty: Black Ops Cold War - Grigori Weaver (2020, voice)
- Call of Duty: Black Ops 6 - Grigori Weaver (2024, voice)
- Call of Duty: Black Ops 7 - Grigori Weaver (2025, voice)
