= Gregory Blair =

American actor, director, and playwright

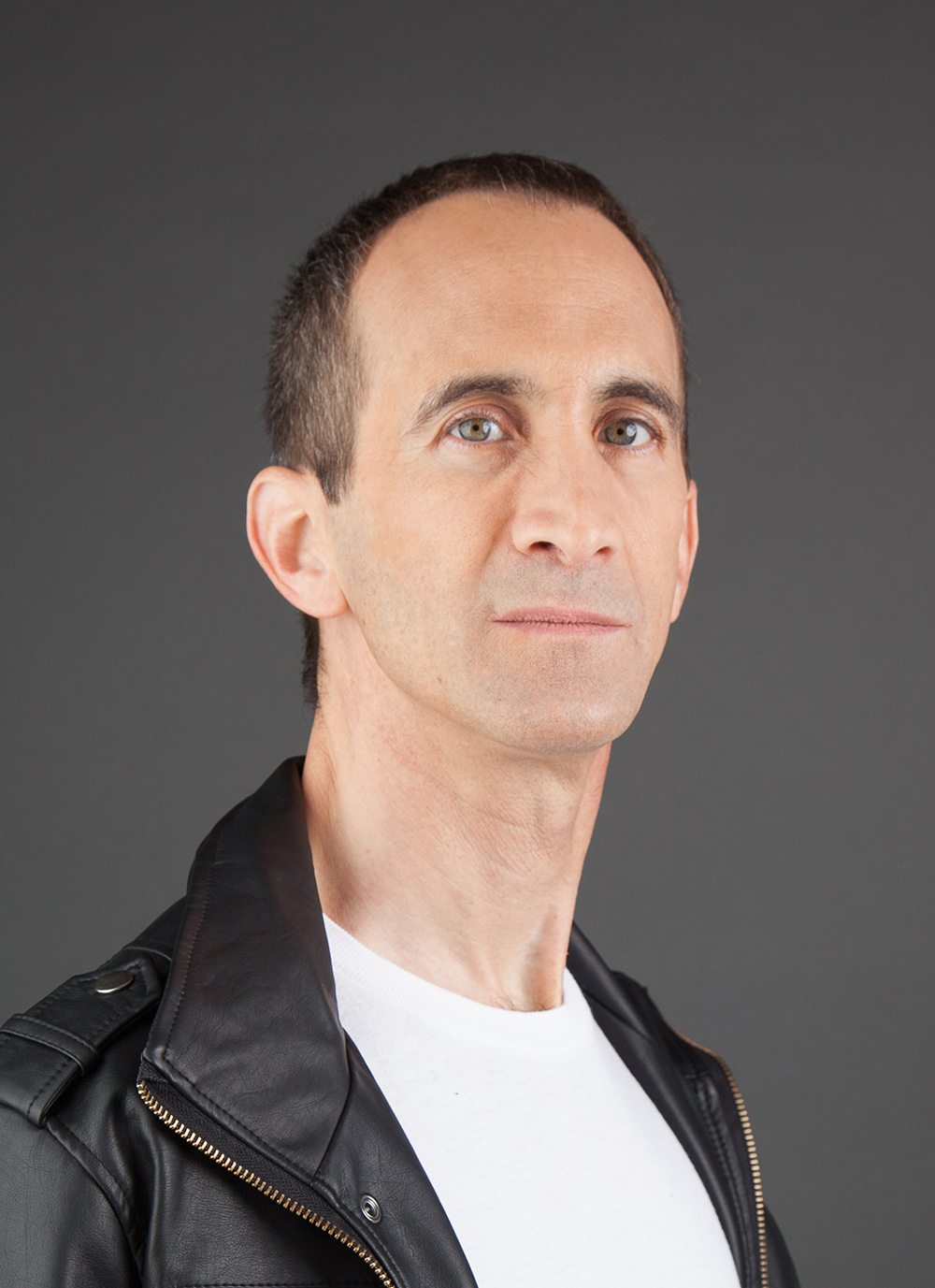
- Education: University of California, Los Angeles
- Occupations: Actor, writer, director, producer
- Website: www.gregoryblair.info

Gregory Blair is an American actor, director, and playwright. Blair has portrayed fall guys, villains and characters in between. He received a Geoffrey Award for Best Character Actor for his role in Sylvia, a Stonewall Award for his novel Spewing Pulp, and an EOTM Award for "Best Director of an Indie Horror Film" for Deadly Revisions. Blair studied in and around Southern California, including at UCLA.

== Career ==
Blair performed in the plays Sylvia, Working, and Six Degrees of Separation, in the films On The Rocks, Ooga Booga, and Garden Party Massacre, and in Escape The Night, Love That Girl!, Alternate History on TV.

Blair wrote the plays Cold Lang Syne, The Last Banana and Nicholas Nickleby. He published the Stonewall Award-winning book Spewing Pulp). Blair has written over a dozen screenplays and a first place in the Horror Screenplay Contest and "Best Screenplay" in the Fantastic Horror Film Festival. Current screenplays sold and/or in production include "Garden Party Massacre", "Heretiks" and Deadly Revisions—which Blair also directed and helped produce.

== Film festival awards ==
- Best Director of an Indie Horror Film (Deadly Revisions) – EOTM Awards
- Best Picture (Deadly Revisions) – Matchflick.com Flicker Awards
- Best Narrative Feature (Deadly Revisions) – Los Angeles Film Awards
- Best Screenplay (Deadly Revisions) – Terror Film Festival
- Best Feature "Garden Party Massacre" – Fantastic Horror Film Festival
- Best Screenplay "Garden Party Massacre" – Fantastic Horror Film Festival
- Outstanding Horror/Comedy Feature "Garden Party Massacre") – Los Angeles Academy of Film Awards

== Filmography ==
=== Film ===
List of acting and crew roles in feature film
Year	Title	Role	Crew role, notes	Source
2008	Zombie Strippers	Zombie		
2013	Deadly Revisions	Crawford Davis	Writer and Director	
2017	Garden Party Massacre	Lincoln	Director	
2017	Death House	Bennett's cast	Trailer posted	
2018	Fang	Harold		

=== Television ===
List of acting performances in television
Year	Title	Role	Notes	Source

== Publications ==
- Spewing Pulp (Infinity Publishing, 2004) ISBN 978-0741420022
- "Who cares if gays marry?" in W. Royce Adams: Viewpoints (Cengage Learning, 2009) ISBN 978-0547182797
